= Naga Prok attitude =

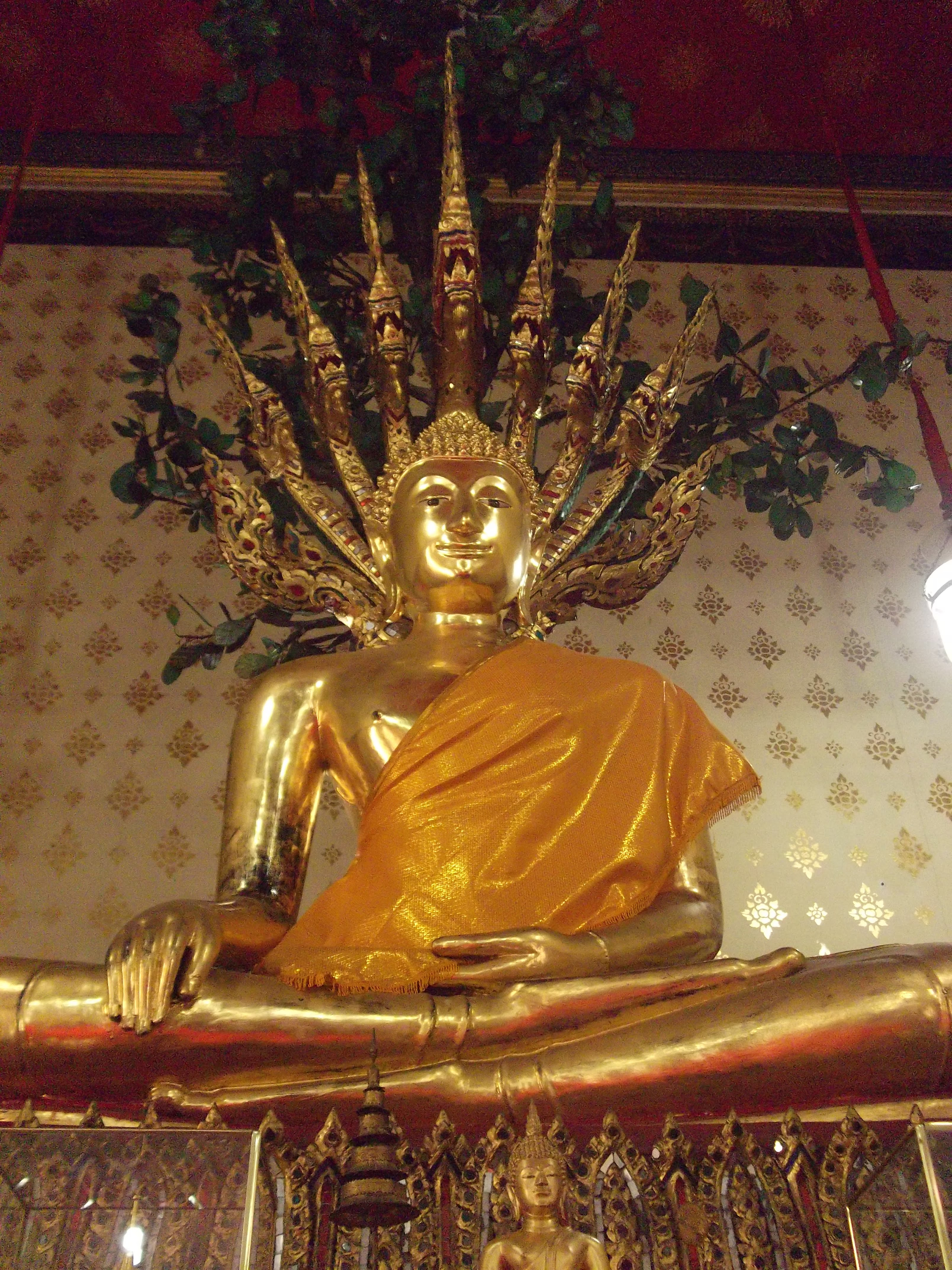
Naga Prok attitude Buddha statue in the ubosot of Wat Shvetachatra Woravihara, Bangkok

Naga Prok attitude (Thai: ปางนาคปรก; RTGS: pang nak prok), translated as "sheltered-by-the-naga Buddha", is an attitude of Buddha in Burmese, Khmer, Lao and Thai art in which the Buddha, seated in either the meditation or maravijaya attitude, is sheltered by or covered with a multi-headed nāga. The nāga, whose name is Mucalinda, usually has seven or nine heads and appeared to coil the base of the Buddha statue.

The attitude references an episode in the Buddha's life after reaching the enlightenment. He travelled to various kingdoms to teach and spent the rest of his time meditating. One night, a heavy storm raged in the forest where he was meditating. A nāga by the name of Mucalinda saw him meditating under harsh weather. Mucalinda decided to coil around his āsana (seat) and use himself as a shield to protect the Buddha from raindrops.

== Gallery ==
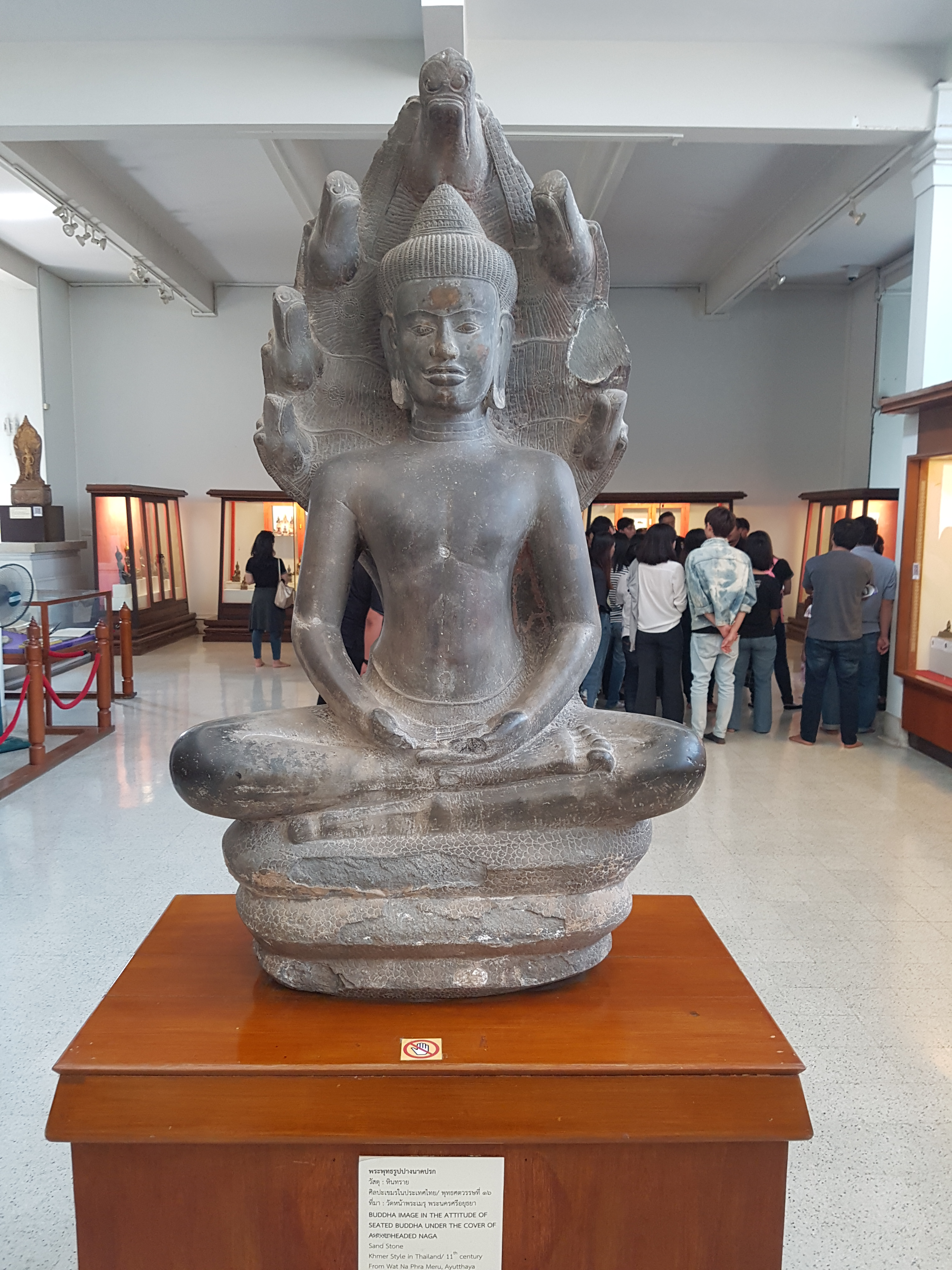
11th century Khmer statue at Chao Sam Phraya National Museum, Ayutthaya province

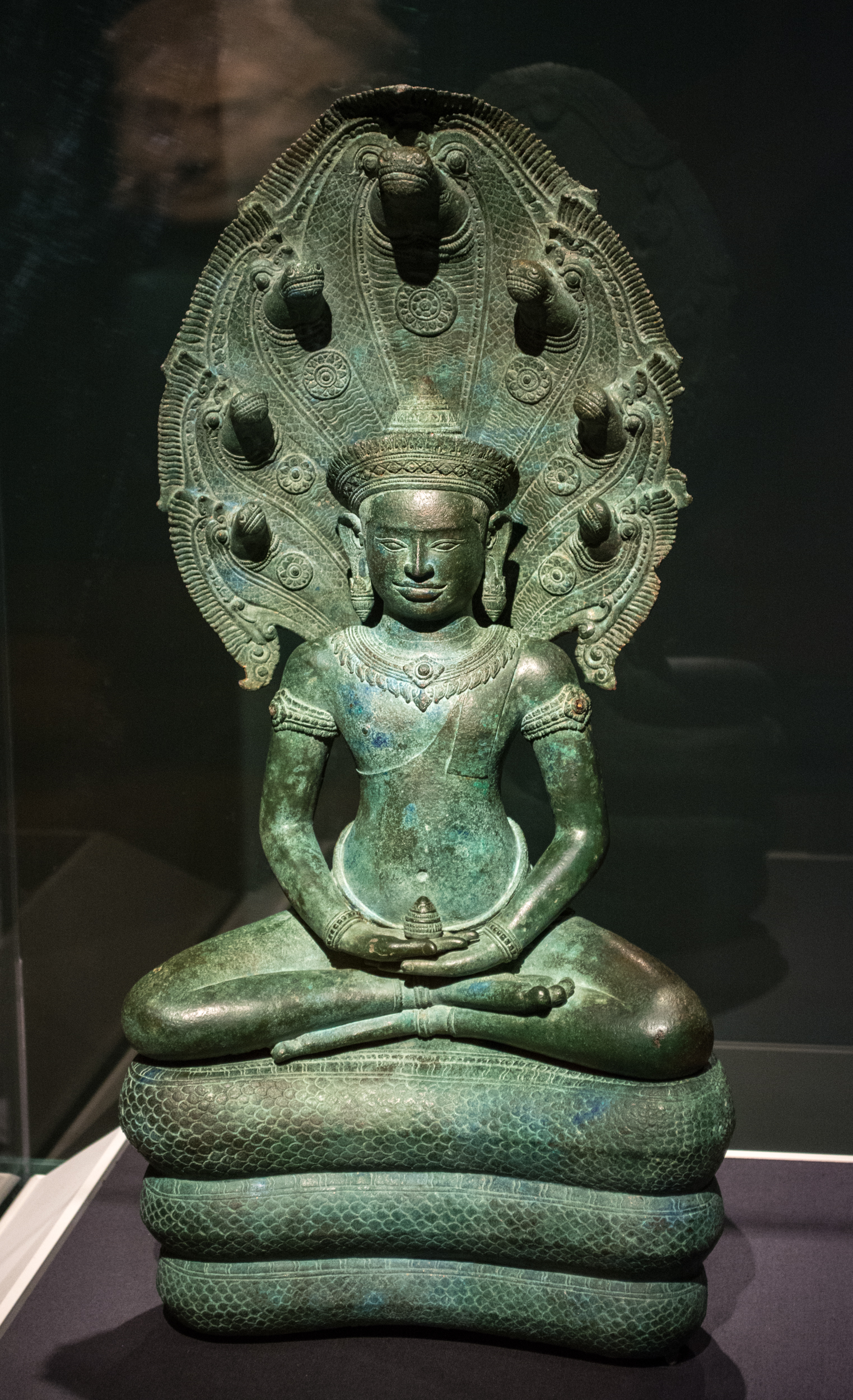
12th century Khmer bronze Naga-enthroned Buddha from Banteay Chhmar, Cambodia

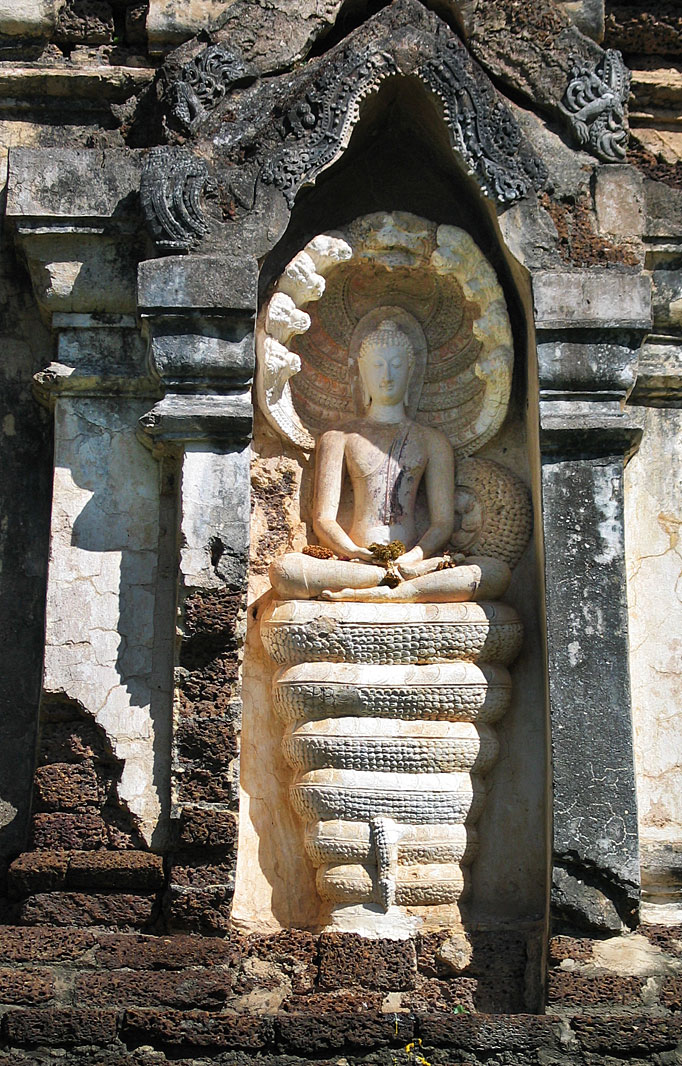
At Sukhothai Historical Park, the statue emphasises the naga's coils.

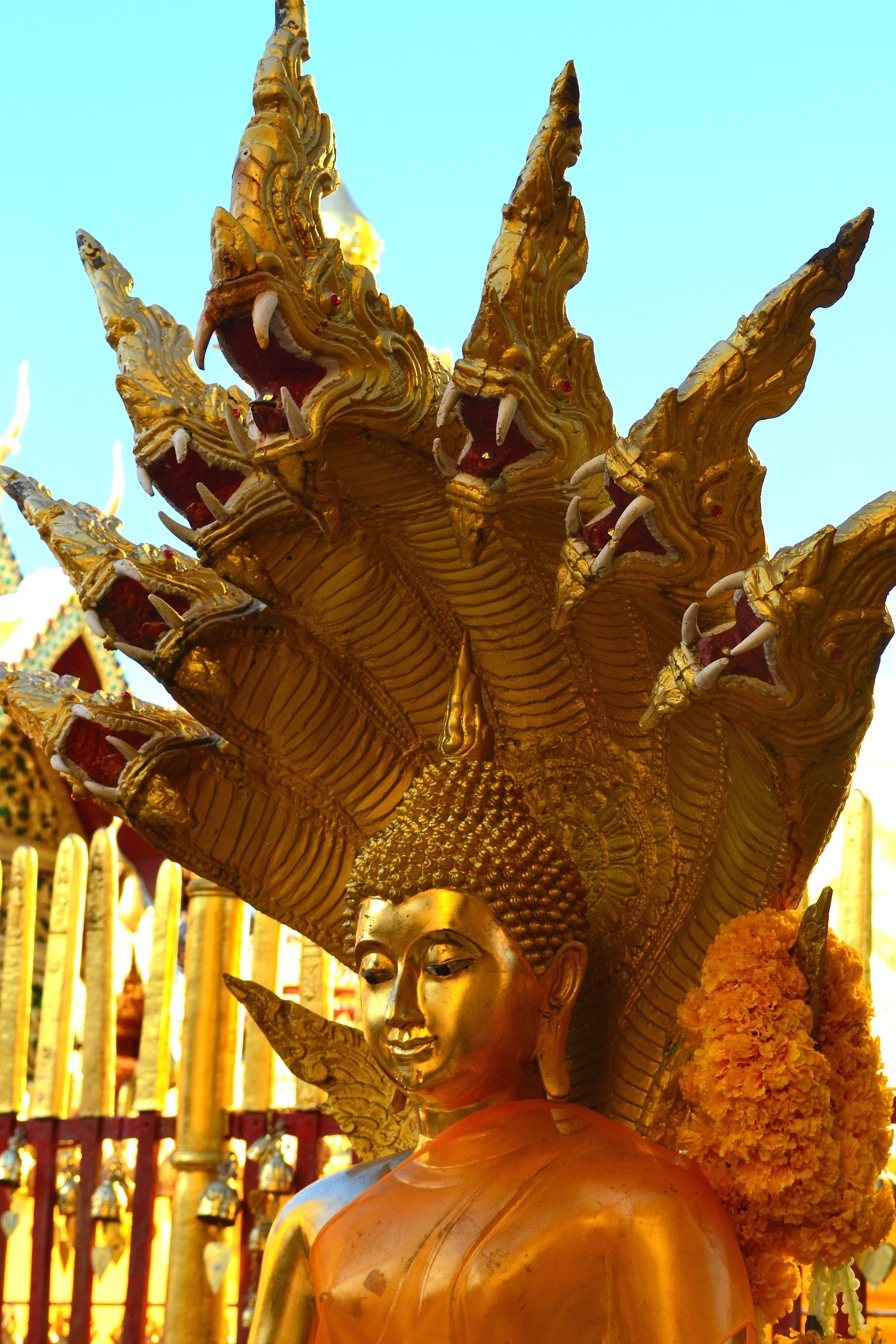
At Wat Phra That Doi Suthep, Chiang Mai province

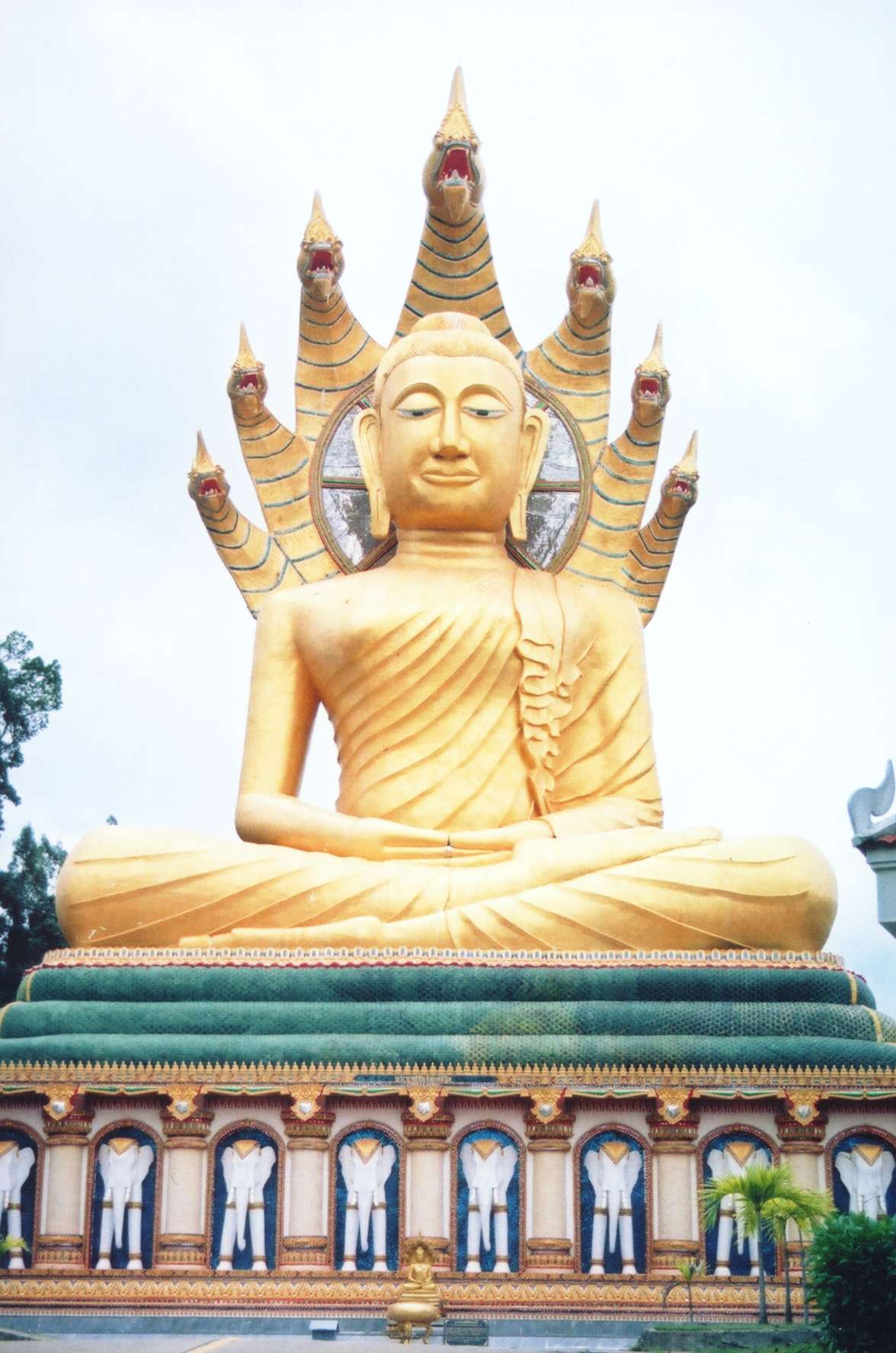
At Wat Bang Reang, Phang Nga province

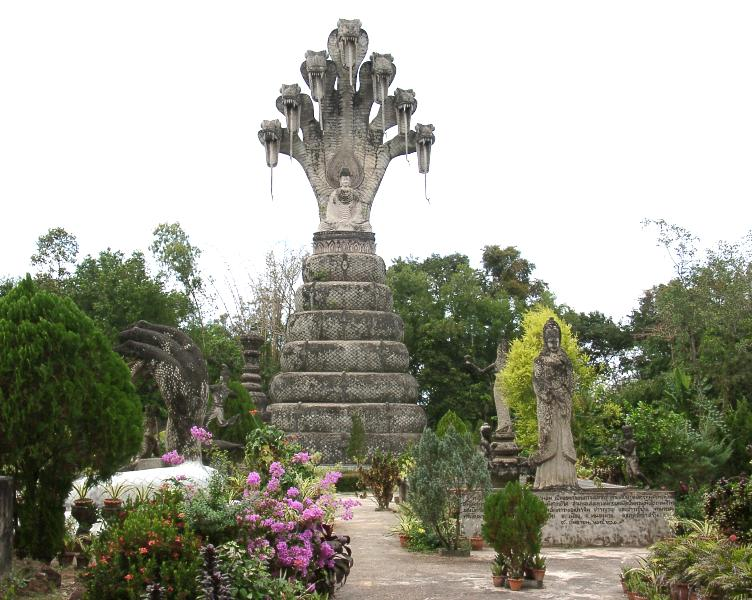
At Sala Keoku, Nong Khai province

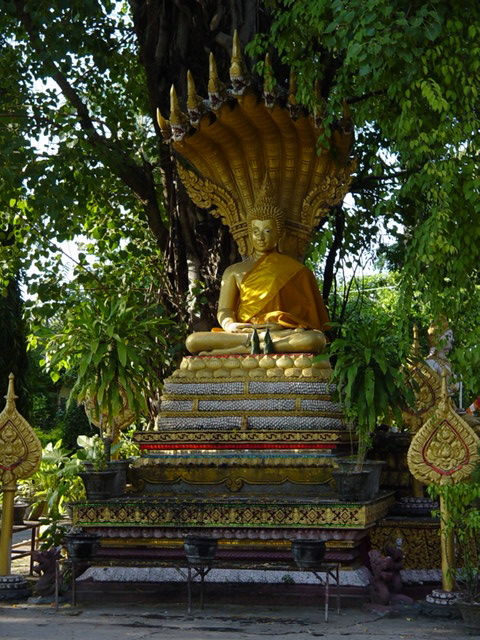
At Wat Simuong, Vientiane

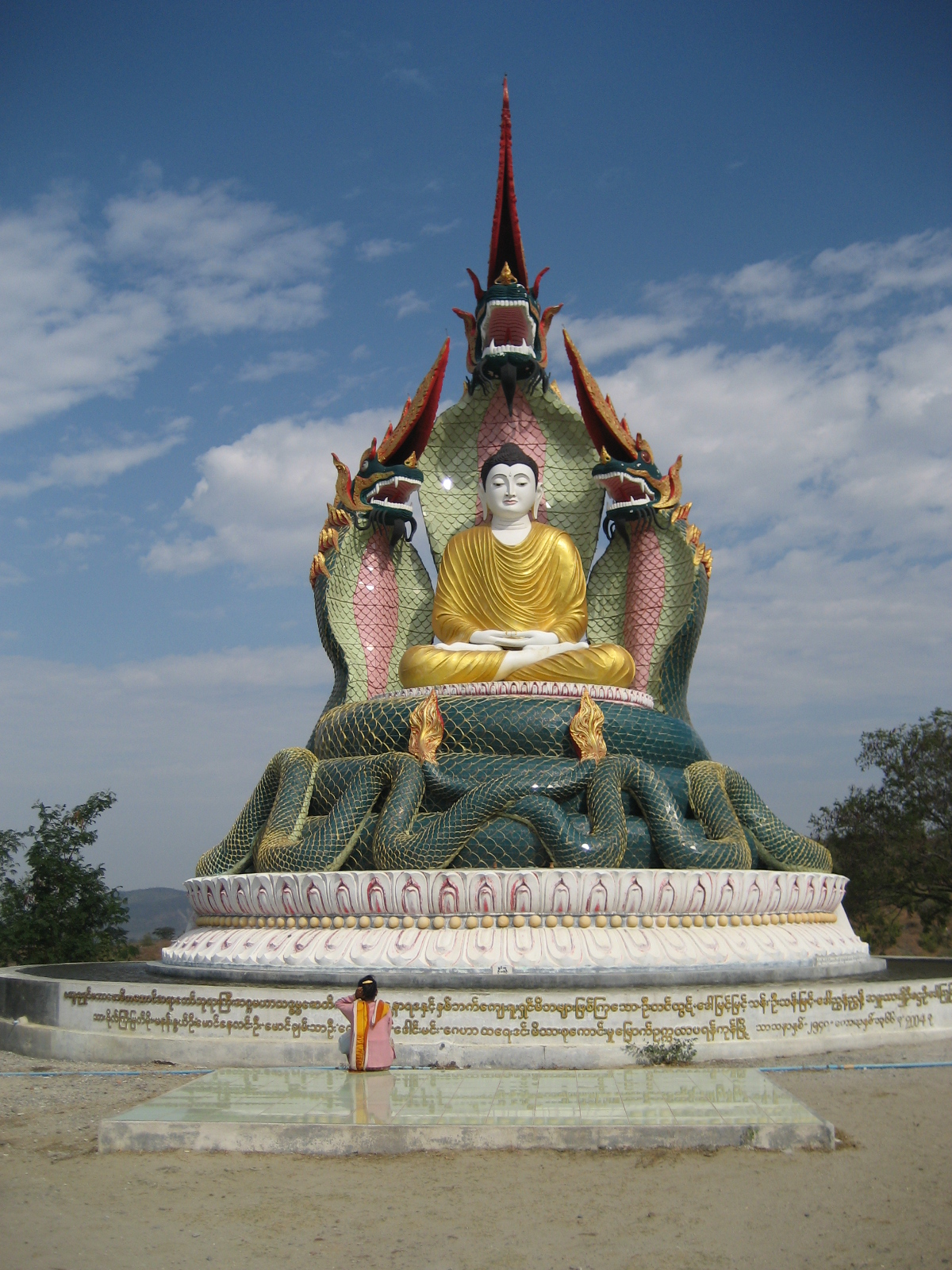
The Nagayon Buddha in Monywa, Myanmar
