= Thai Buddhist sculpture =

A Buddha image in Thailand typically refers to three-dimensional stone, wood, clay, or metal cast images of the Buddha. While there are such figures in all regions where Buddhism is commonly practiced, the appearance, composition and position of the images vary greatly from country to country in Buddhist art.

== Dvaravati period ==
During the Dvaravati period (seventh through eleventh centuries), there were two factions of Buddhism practiced in the region that now encompasses present day Thailand, namely Mahayana and Theravada. The types of images constructed during this era reflects the distinction. Much of the basis for the Buddhist artwork of the Dvaravati period was influence from Buddhist art in India, including the Amaravati school and Gupta styles, although there was also local and Khmer influence. Such images include the following classical archetypes:

- Buddha in the tribhanga (leaning) position with somewhat Indian facial features and no aureole. The right hand is typically free, while the left is depicted grasping the Buddha's robe.
- Buddha in the Amaravati style with loosely folded legs and a lotus shaped aureole. Such statues have a continuous eyebrow, a flat nose and thick lips.
- Square faced cleft chin Buddha with some Khmer features. Legs are typically fully folded. The Buddha sits on a lotus base.

== Sri Vijaya images ==
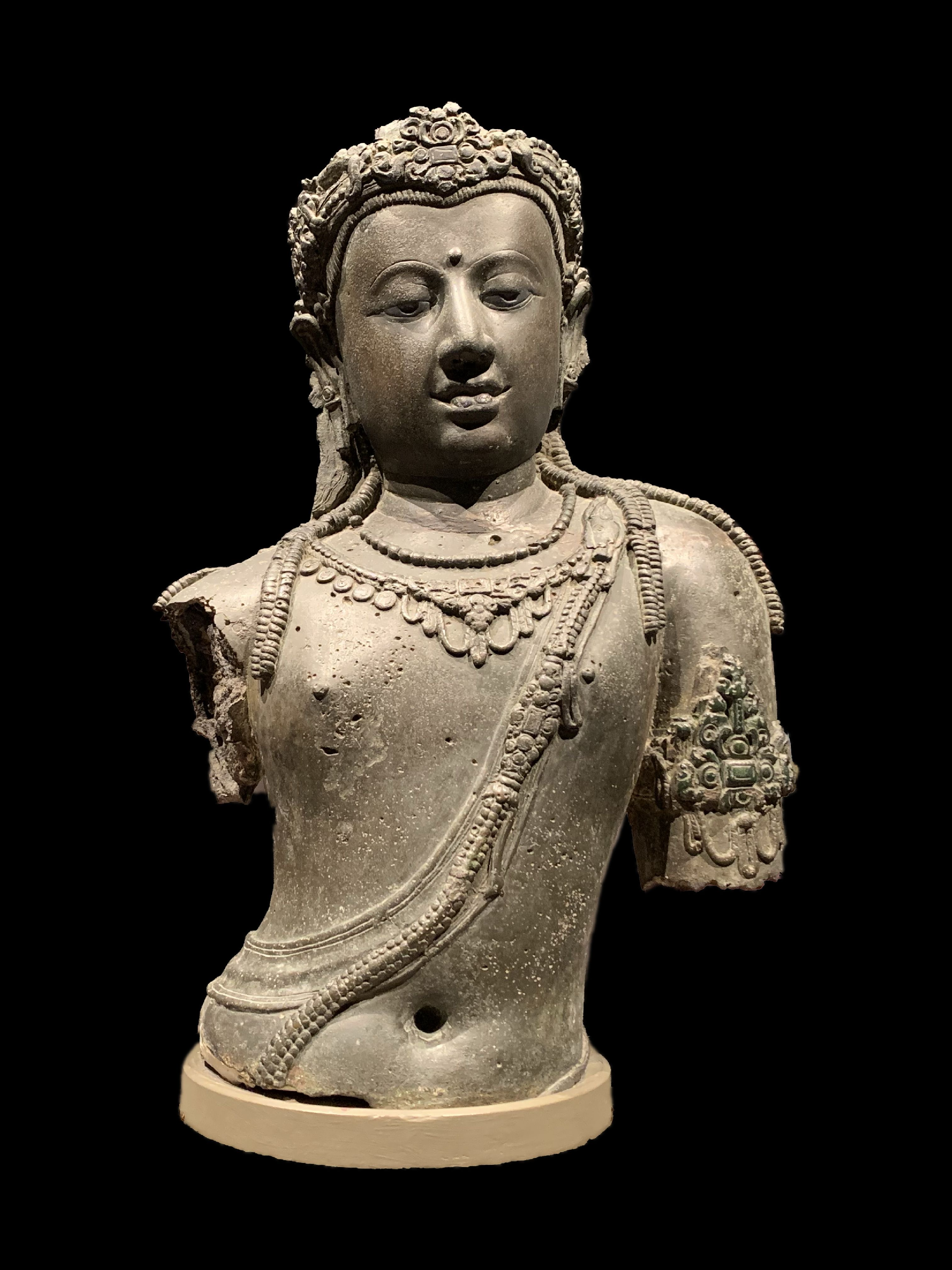
Avalokiteshvara of Chaiya, bronze torso statue, 8th century CE, Srivijaya art, Chaiya, Surat Thani, southern Thailand.

Sri Vijaya images are found in Southern Thailand Malay Peninsula. They were created between the eighth and thirteenth centuries. Typically, they reflect the teachings of the Mahayana school of Buddhism, which often emphasized the veneration of the sacred figure of Boddhisattvas. The Srivijayan art are noted for its naturalistic style, ideal body proportions, natural pose and body elegance, and richly adorned jewelries, akin to Indonesian Javanese Buddhist art.

A famous example of Sri Vijayan art is the bronze torso statue of Boddhisattva Padmapani (Avalokiteshvara), 8th century CE Srivijayan art, from Chaiya District, Surat Thani, Southern Thailand. The statue demonstrate the influence of Central Java art (Shailendra art) . In 1905 Prince Damrong Rajanubhab removed the statue from Wat Wiang, Chaiya, Surat Thani to Bangkok National Museum, Thailand.

Although some of Sri Vijayan Buddhist image were made of bronze and stone, most of Sri Vijaya images were generally made of clay, with less emphasis on durability, as their purpose was to benefit the deceased, rather than perpetuate the teachings of the Buddha.

== Lopburi images ==
Lopburi images date back to the eleventh century. They are typically found in Northeast Thailand, and their style is essentially similar to Cambodian Buddha images. Such images typically have a cone-shaped cranial protuberance in the form of tiers of lotus petals. The hair depicted in the images is considerably more realistic than the hair of the Dvaravati images, and may be either straight or curly. The face of the Buddha typically has a small smile, while the earlobes are in unusually large proportion relative to the rest of the face, often hanging down nearly to the image's shoulders. A second Lopburi style is the Naga Protected Buddha with the heads of Naga forming a protective taper around the Buddha's head.

== Chiang Saen and Lanna images ==
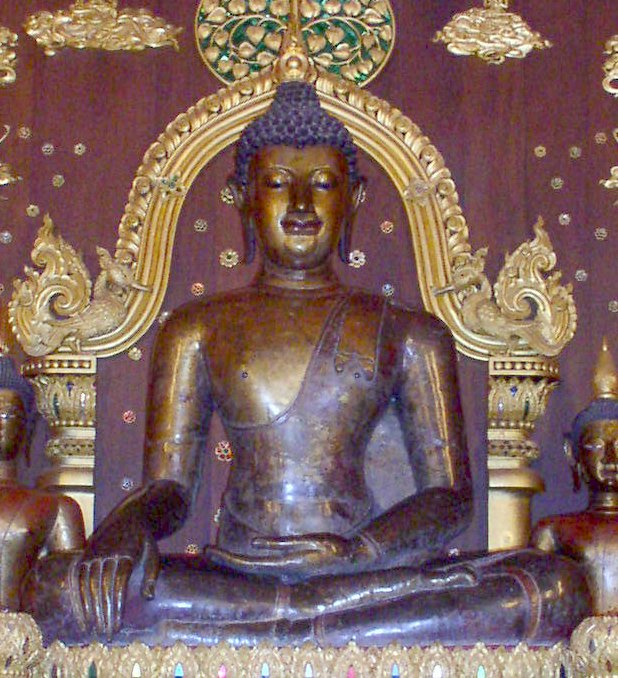
Chiang Saen Style Buddha image

Chiang Saen and Lanna images were created in northern Thailand between the tenth and thirteenth centuries. Early images were similar to the Pala style Buddha images of India, with lotus bud or orb shaped hair curls, round faces, narrow lips and prominent chests. Such images were usually in the subduing Mara position, cross-legged, with the soles of the Buddha's feet visible. Many later Chiang Saen and Lanna images began to be constructed from crystals and gemstones.

Two of the most important Buddha images in Thailand, the Emerald Buddha and the Phra Phuttha Sihing are made in the Lanna style.

== Sukhothai period ==
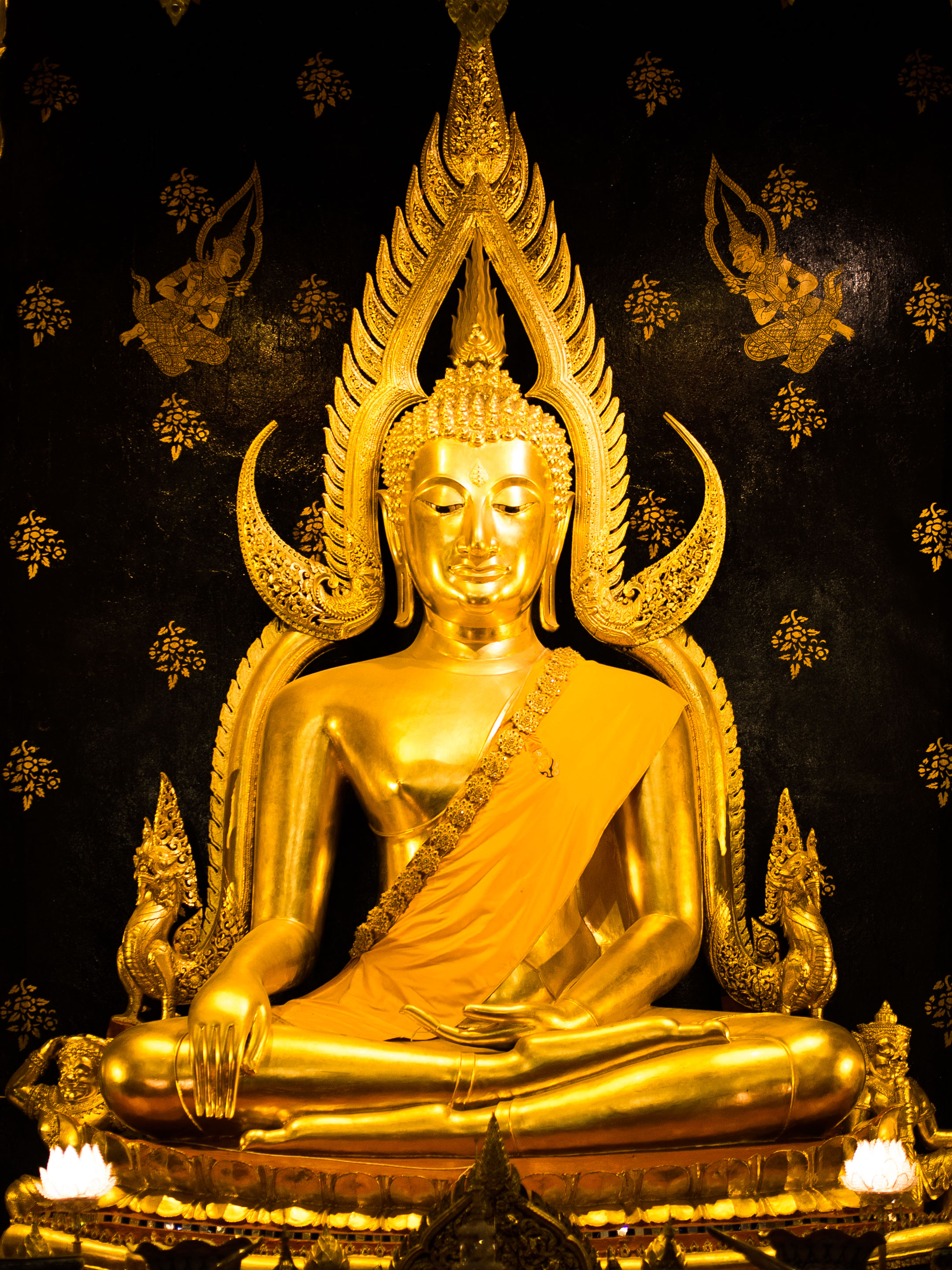
Phra Buddha Chinnarat, Wat Phra Si Rattana Mahathat in Phitsanulok, Sukhothai Art

During the Sukhothai period (fourteenth century), the style of the Thai Buddha images radically changed due to the influx of new ideas from Sri Lankan Buddhism. Buddha images were cast with the intention of depicting superhuman traits of the Buddha, and were designed to express compassion and serenity in posture and facial expression. The Sukhothai period witnessed the innovation of the four modern postures of the Thai Buddha, i.e. walking, standing, sitting and reclining. Images often had a flame-shaped aureole, finely curled hair, a slight smile, broad shoulders and an oval face. A common pose was the subduing Mara, with the Buddha seated on a plain base. Notable variations within the Sukhothai period include the Kamphaengpet, the Phra Buddha Chinnarat (such as the most famous Chinnarat at Wat Phra Sri Rattana Mahatat Woramahawihan), and the Wat Ta Kuan groups of images.

Wat Traimit Golden Buddha, which is a famous tourist attraction in Bangkok, is made in the Sukhothai style, so it may indeed date from that period.

== U Thong images ==
There are three categories of U Thong images from the twelfth through fifteenth century in central Thailand. The first such style was a fusion of the Dvaravati and Khmer style images. They would typically adorn a lotus bud aureole and Khmer facial features. The second style was similar to the Lopburi images. The third and most recent U Thong style had considerable influence from the Sukhothai images, but often had hair bands unique to U Thong images.

== Ayutthaya period ==
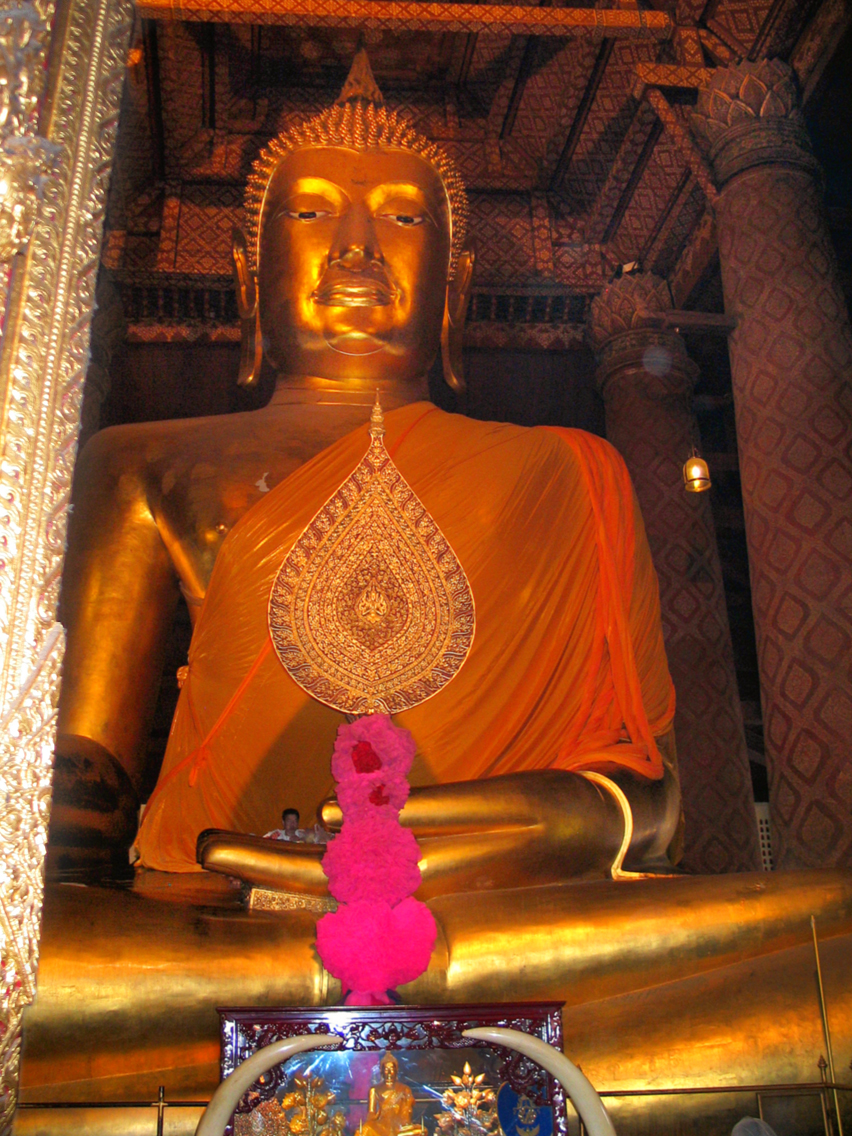
Luang Pho Tho in Wat Phanan Choeng, Ayutthaya

Ayutthaya images were created between the tenth and eighteenth centuries. They had a unique hair frame and tell-tale narrow carvings above the lips and eyes. Early Ayutthaya images were carved in stone with heavy influence from the Lopburi images. Middle Ayutthaya images were similar to the Sukhothai images, and were in similar poses. During this period, the images were often cast in Bronze, and the size of the images were often large. In the late Ayutthaya period, the images typically depicted the Buddha in royal attire, and the bases of the images bore ornate design.

== Modern Thai Buddha images ==
In modern times, Buddha images are often replicas of images from the Sukhothai and other early periods, often more ornately and elaborately adorned. Faces in new innovative depictions are typically more realistic and human-like. An elongated flame aureole is popular. Robes depicted in modern images often depict floral designs. The Indian Gandhara style, as well as western art have also influenced many of the modern images.

Bunleua Sulilat's concrete sculpture gardens (Buddha Park and Sala Keoku) give an example of contemporary highly creative and unconventional artistic treatment of Buddhist subjects. See also Wat Rong Khun and Sanctuary of Truth.

== See also ==
- Iconography of Gautama Buddha in Laos and Thailand
- Buddhist Art
- Buddhism in Thailand
- Luang Phor Phet are statues of the Buddha depicted in the (Diamond) Lotus Position or Vajrāsana
- Lao Buddhist sculpture
- Attitude of Buddha in Thai art (ปางพระพุทธรูป; paang phra phutta roup)
  - Leela attitude
  - Maravijaya attitude
