= Iconography of Gautama Buddha in Laos and Thailand =

Theravadin Buddhist iconography

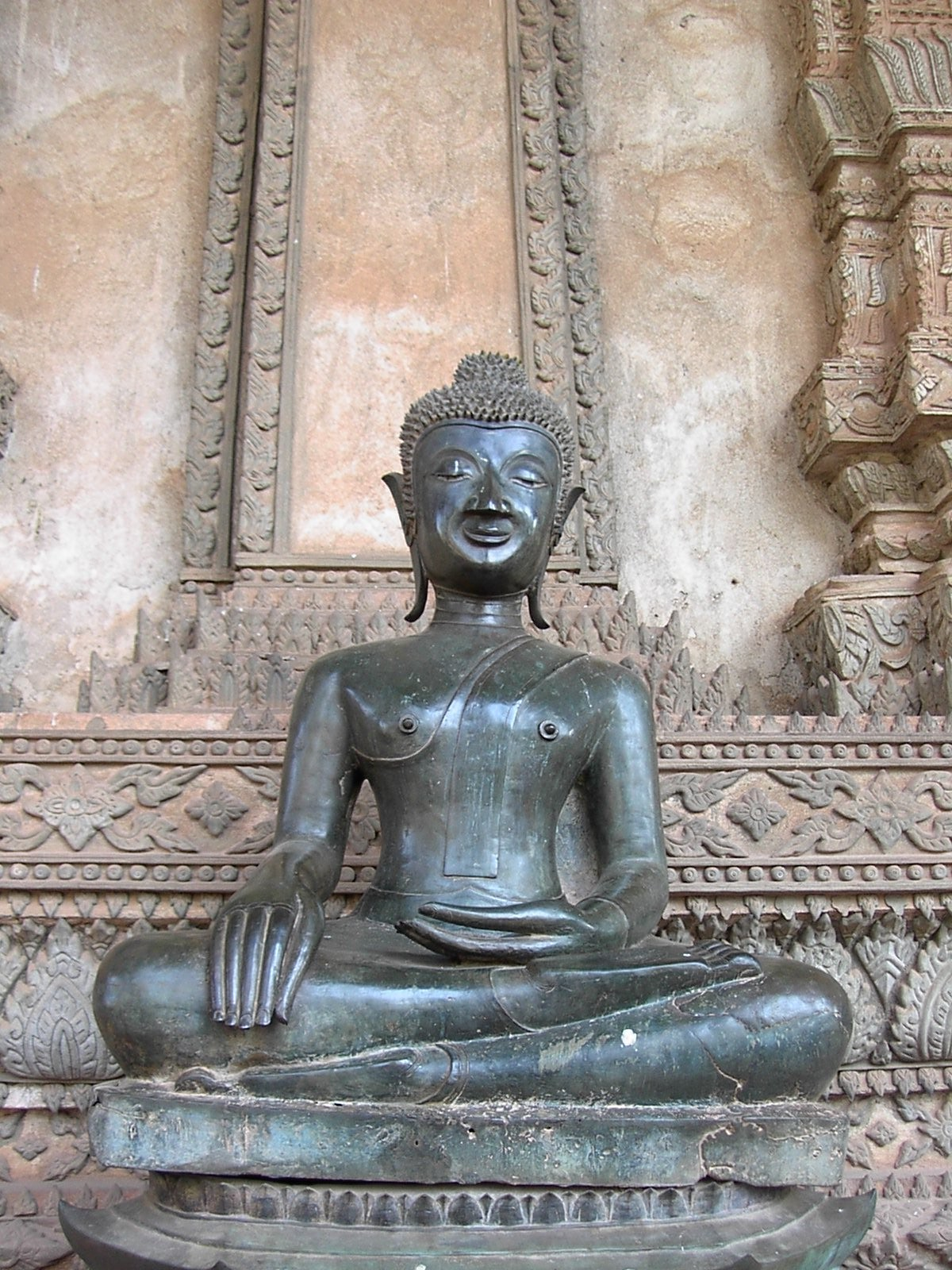
Statue of "the Buddha calling the earth to witness (Maravijaya Attitude)," one of the most common depictions. The Buddha's hands are in the bhūmisparśa mudrā (Earth-touching position). Haw Phra Kaew temple, Viang Chan, Laos

The iconography of Gautama Buddha in Laos and Thailand recall specific episodes during his travels and teachings that are familiar to the Buddhists according to an iconography with specific rules. The Buddha is always represented with certain physical attributes, and in specified dress and specified poses. Each pose, and particularly the position and gestures of the Buddha's hands, has a defined meaning which is familiar to Buddhists. In other Buddhist countries, different but related iconography is used, for example the mudras in Indian art. Certain ones of these are considered particularly auspicious for those born on particular days of the week.

== Introduction ==
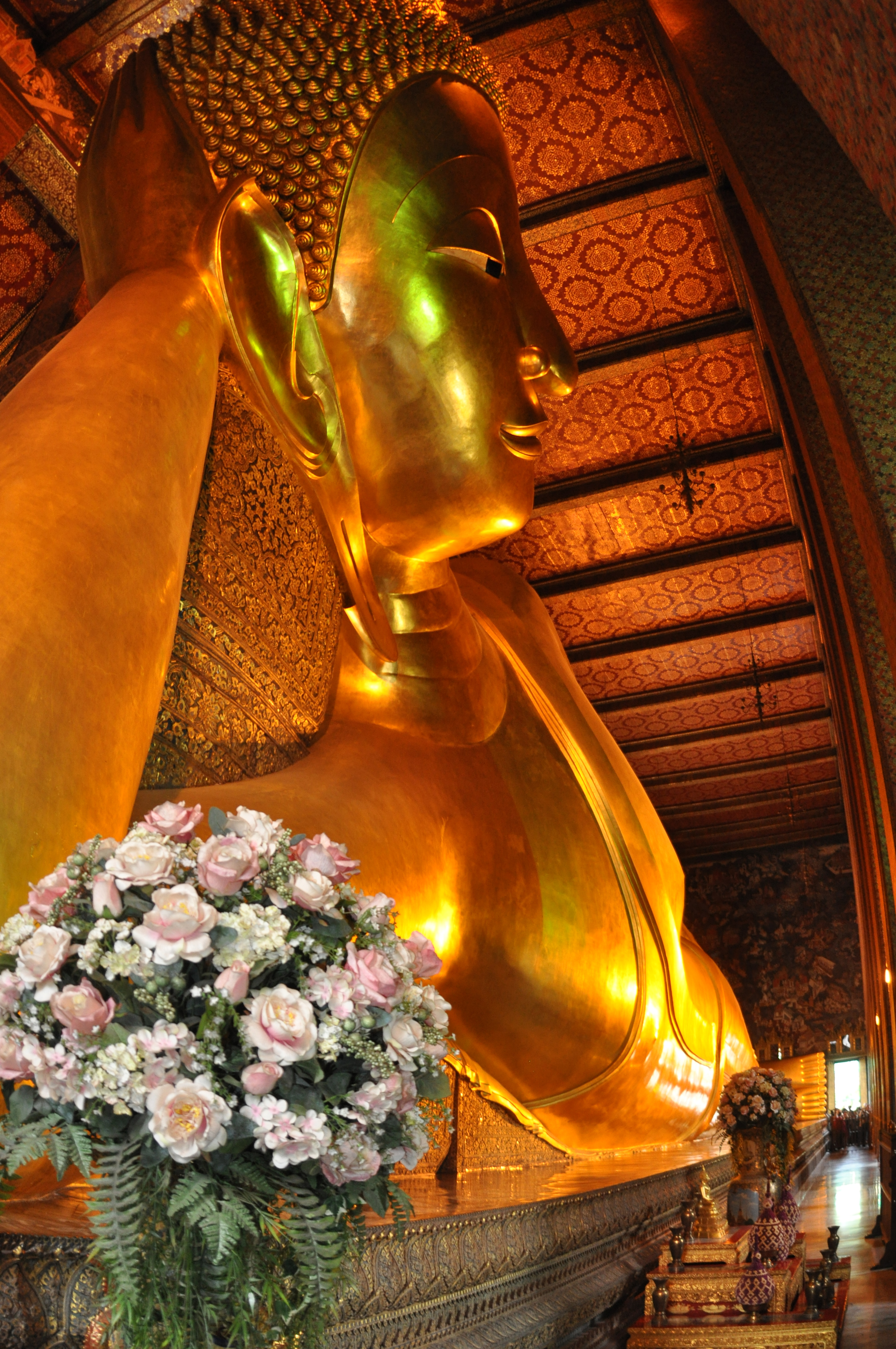
The Reclining Buddha

For Buddhists, the correct depiction of the Buddha is not merely an artistic matter; Buddhists believe that a properly rendered Buddha image is a hypostasis: an actual spiritual emanation of the Buddha, which possesses supernatural qualities. Although the Buddha is not a god, Buddhists seek to communicate with the supernatural world through Buddha images, making offerings to them and praying before them.

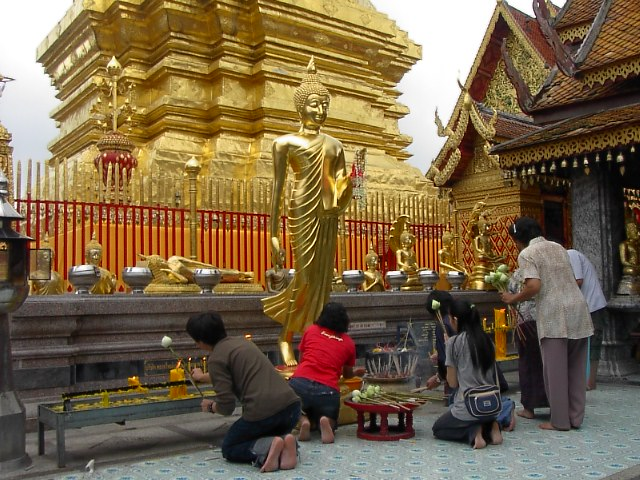
Buddhists venerating a Leela Buddha image (Wat Doi Suthep, Chiang Mai, Thailand)

Buddha images are not intended to be naturalistic representations of what Gautama Buddha looked like. There are no contemporary images of him, and the oldest Buddha images date from 500 to 600 years after his lifetime. But Buddhists believe that Buddha images represent an ideal reality of the Buddha, and that every Buddha image stands at the end of a succession of images reaching back to the Buddha himself.

When creating a Buddha image, the artist is expected to be in a spiritual and mental state (samādhi) that will enable him to visualise this ideal reality. There is no requirement that every Buddha image be identical, and in fact there is a wide variety of artistic styles and national traditions in representing the Buddha. There are, however, certain rules of representation that must be adhered to.

== Development ==
The current range of postures in which the Buddha may be shown, and the gestures which may be depicted, evolved over the first millennium of the Buddhist era (roughly 500 BCE to 500 CE), mainly in India, the original homeland of Buddhism. The tradition of images that reached South-East Asia had been changed in the later 5th century CE, apparently first at Sarnath in India. The new "Sarnath image type" or "Gupta period Buddhist image" differs from earlier Buddha images, such as those in Greco-Buddhist art, in a number of respects: the gaze is lowered, the clinging robes disclose no male genital bulge, the robe lacks folds, and there are different body proportions.

In the early part of this period, the Buddha was usually shown giving a general gesture of benediction, with the right hand held at shoulder-height with the palm facing forward and the fingers together and slightly bent. By the end of the Gupta Empire (about 550 CE), the canon of representation had become more varied, with the seated meditative position (dhyāna mudrā – see below) becoming common, particularly in Sri Lanka. By the 7th century CE the canon was largely as it is seen today.

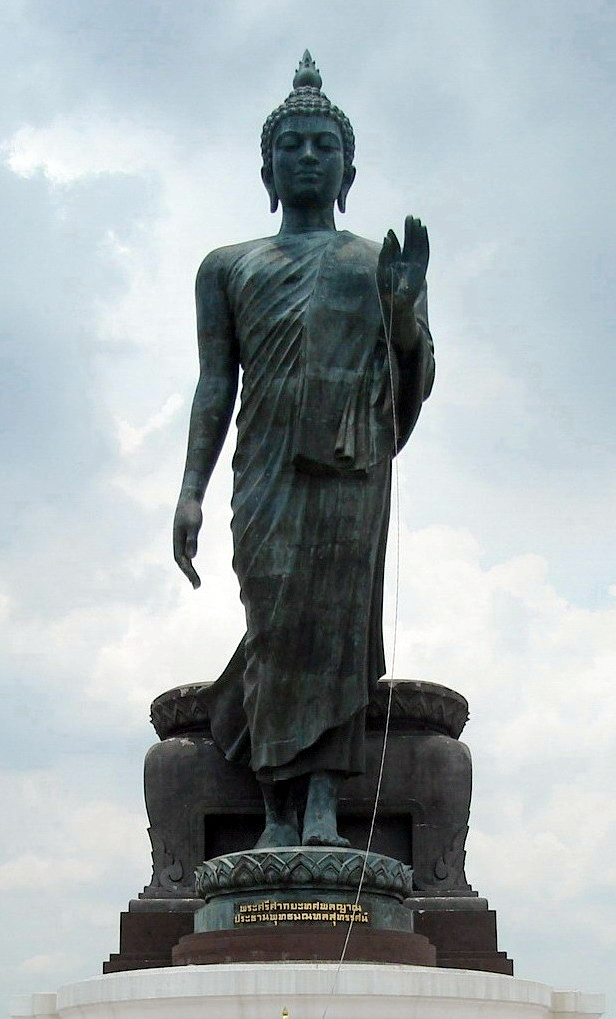
Statue of the Buddha with his hand upraised in the abhaya mudrā position. Walking in the Leela attitude, he is draped with monastic robes, with the right shoulder bare. (Phutthamonthon, Thailand)

As Buddhism spread from India to other countries, variations in the depiction of the Buddha evolved. This article describes the canon of Buddha representation in Thailand and Laos. This canon was not formalised until the 19th century, as part of the general project of "modernisation" that followed the Buddhist world's encounter with Western civilisation. A key figure in this process was the Siamese royal prince and Buddhist monk Paramanuchit Chinorot, a son of King Rama I, who in 1814 was appointed administrator of the Wat Pho royal temple in Bangkok. At the request of King Rama III, Paramanuchit described and represented 40 different postures of the Buddha in an illustrated treatise called Pathama Sambodhikatha. Some of these, such as "Buddha threading a needle," were new, although justified through reference to the literary accounts of the Buddha's life. Paramanuchit's illustrations were later rendered as bronze miniatures, which can be seen today at Wat Phra Kaew in Bangkok and serve as templates for the creation of modern Buddhist imagery.

== Attributes of the Buddha ==
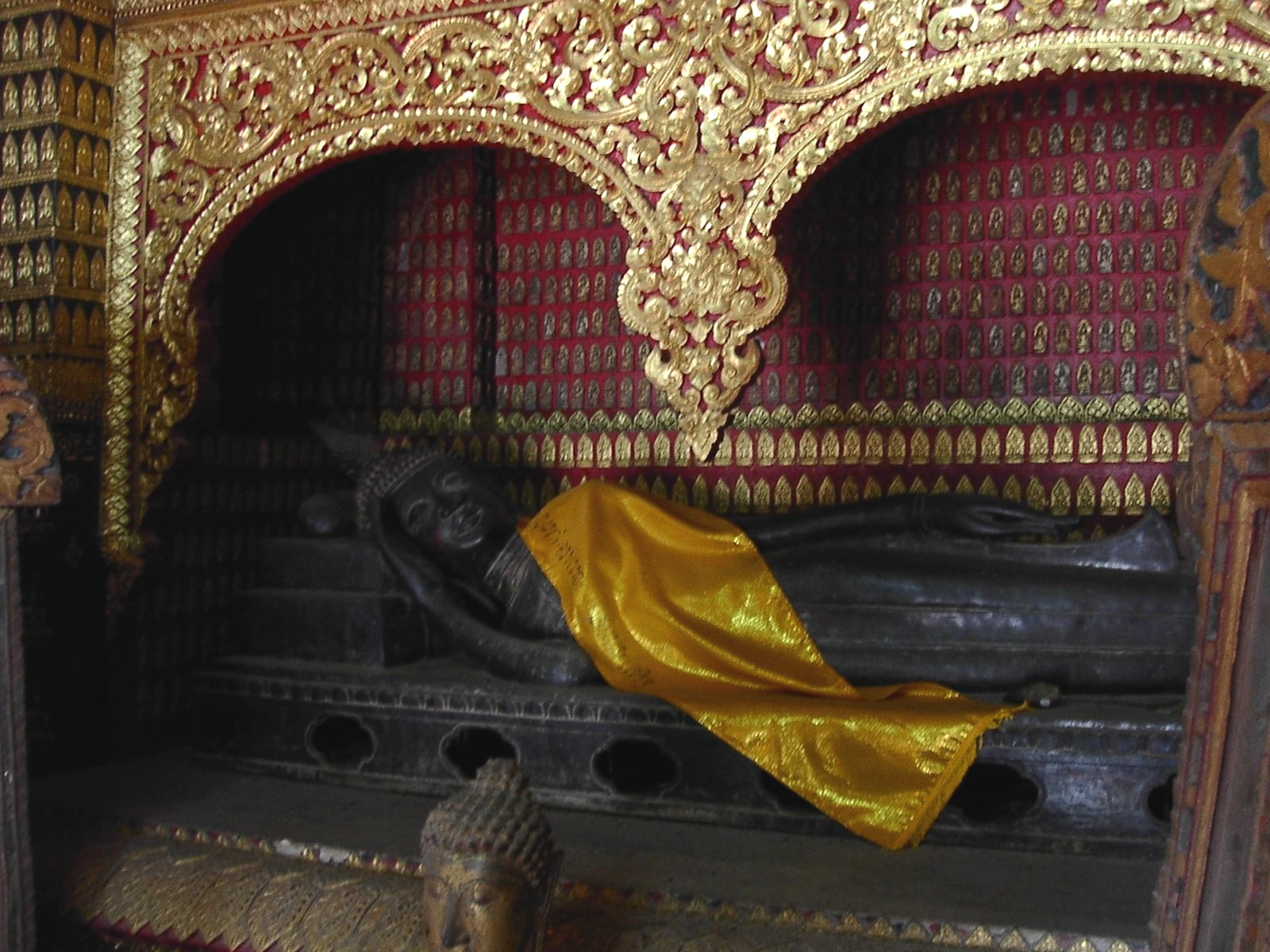
Reclining Buddha (Wat Xieng Thong, Luang Phrabāng, Laos)

The Dīgha Nikāya, a Pāli text of the 1st century BCE, gives a list of 32 physical attributes of the Buddha. Some of these are poetic or fanciful ("legs like an antelope's," "ankles like rounded shells"), while others are more specific: feet with level tread, projecting heels, long and slender fingers and toes, a tuft of hair between the eyebrows. Although it is not required that Buddha images reflect all of these attributes, many of them have acquired canonical status.

The Buddha is said to have had a protuberance on the top of his skull, the ushnisha. This is sometimes shown as a spire or spike, and sometimes only as a small bump. The Buddha always has a serene expression or a faint smile. The Buddha is also always depicted with very long earlobes. This is attributed to his earlier life as a prince, weighed down by material possession, but has since come to symbolize wisdom.

== Posture and dress ==
The Buddha may be depicted in one of four postures:

- Sitting: If seated, the Buddha may be shown in one of three different positions

In the "heroic posture" (vīrāsana), with the legs folded over each other
In the "adamantine posture" (vajrāsana; also known as "lotus position"), with the legs crossed so that the soles of both feet are turned up
In the position of a person sitting in a chair (pralambanāsana)

- Standing: If standing, the Buddha may be shown either with his feet together, or with one foot forward
- Walking
- Reclining: The reclining posture may represent the Buddha resting or sleeping, but more usually represents the mahāparinibbāna: the Buddha's final state of enlightenment before his death

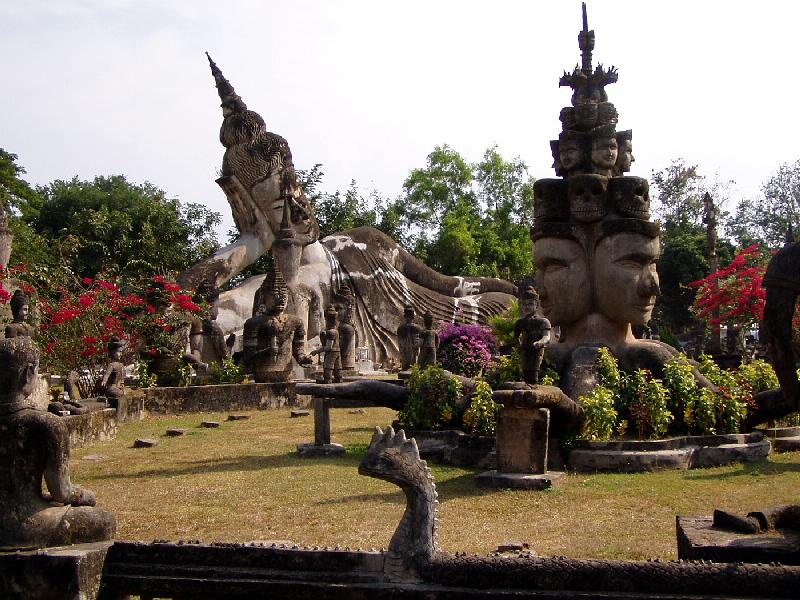
Modern gigantic rendition of the reclining Buddha in Bunleua Sulilat's Buddha Park

The Buddha is nearly always depicted wearing a monastic robe, of the type worn by Buddhist monks today. The robe may be shown as worn in the "covering mode" (draped over both shoulders) or in the "open mode" (leaving the right shoulder and breast uncovered). The robe is a representation of the Buddha's humility. (Gautama was originally a prince, who renounced the world to seek enlightenment, and his original robe was made from the shroud of a corpse.) The robe is sometimes shown as diaphanous, transparent or billowing mysteriously, suggesting the spiritual power emanating from the Buddha. Buddha images are often draped with real robes, which are renewed periodically, usually at major festivals. The Buddha may also be shown wearing royal attire, but this is uncommon.

== Hand gestures ==
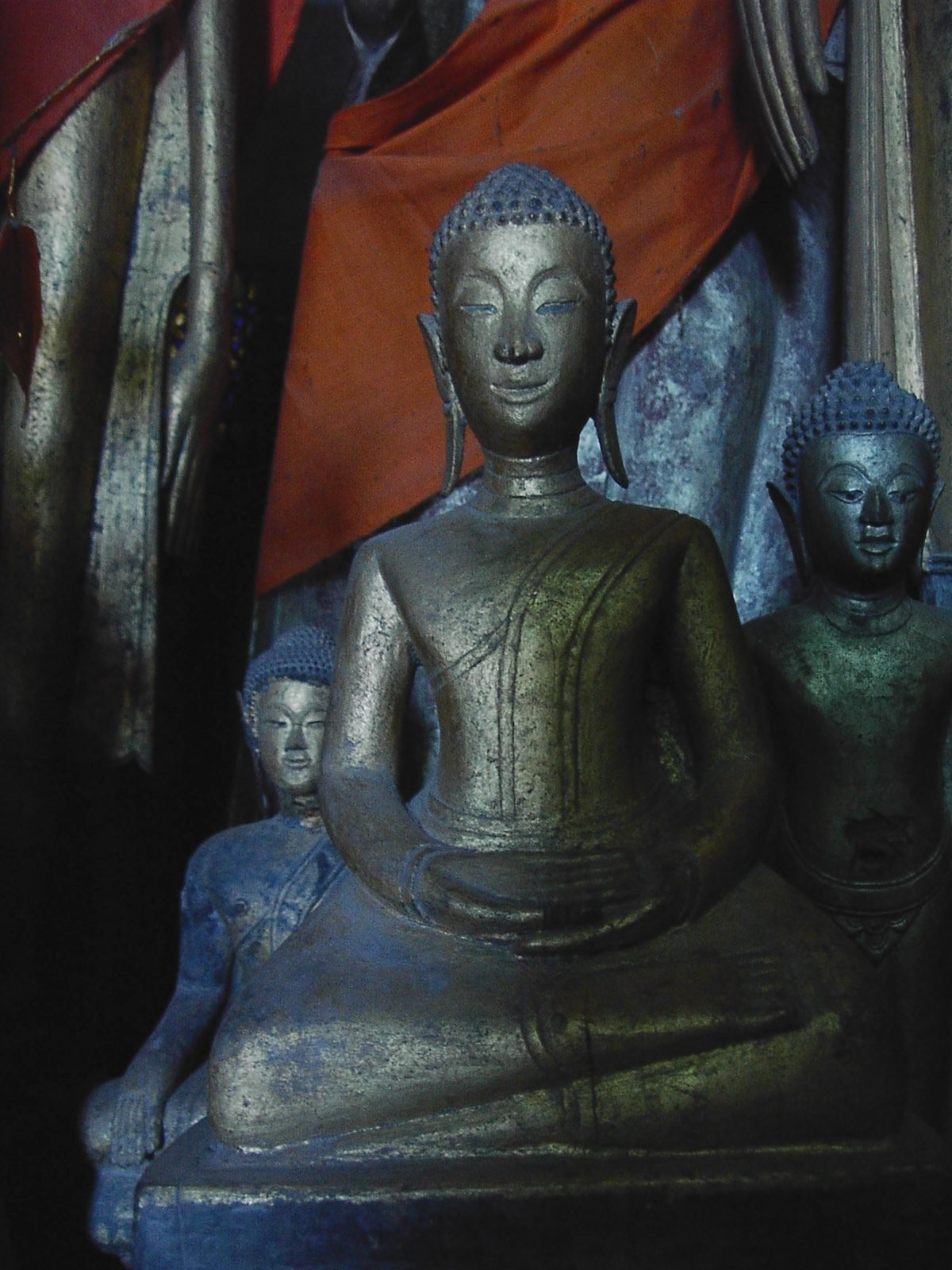
Statue of "the Buddha meditating." The Buddha's hands are in the dhyāna mudrā position. (Wat Xieng Thong, Luang Phrabāng, Laos)

The most important aspect of the iconography of the Buddha is gestures made with the hands, known as mudrā. These gestures have meanings which are known throughout the Buddhist world, and when combined with the postures described above, give a complete representation, usually associated with a particular incident in the life of the Buddha.

The six mudrā associated with the Buddha are:

- Touching the earth (Bhūmiśparṣa mudrā) (มารวิชัย; pang maa-rá-wí-chai): the right arm rests on the right thigh with the fingers pointing downwards, but not always touching the earth (as can be seen in the image at the top of this page). The left hand rests in the dhyāna mudrā position in the Buddha's lap. This mudrā is called in Pāḷi and Sanskrit "calling the earth to witness (to his fulfilment of the perfections, pāramī). In Thai it is known as "Buddha subduing Māra (the demon who tried to prevent him attaining enlightenment by various means)". This is by far the most commonly depicted mudrā.
- Meditation (Dhyāna mudrā) th:ปางสมาธิ pang sà-măa-tí: the hands are shown lying flat in the Buddha's lap, palms upward. This mudrā is associated with a seated Buddha. It shows that the Buddha is disciplining his mind through mental concentration, a necessary step to achieving enlightenment.
- Charity (Varana mudrā) th:ปางประทานพร pang bprà-taan pon: the right arm is shown pendent (extended downwards), with the open palm turned to the front and the fingers extended. This mudrā is usually associated with a standing Buddha. This position can signify either that the Buddha is granting blessings or receiving charitable offerings.
- Fearlessness (Abhaya mudrā) th:ปางประทานอภัย pang bprà-taan à-pai: either one or both arms are shown bent at the elbow and the wrist, with the palm facing outwards and the fingers pointing upwards. It shows the Buddha either displaying fearlessness in the face of adversity, or enjoining others to do so. With the right hand raised, it is also called "calming animals" th:ปางโปรดสัตว์ pang pròht sàt, and with both hands raised it is also called "forbidding the relatives" th:ปางห้ามญาติ pang ham yat. These 'mudrā are usually associated with a standing Buddha, but seated representations are not uncommon.

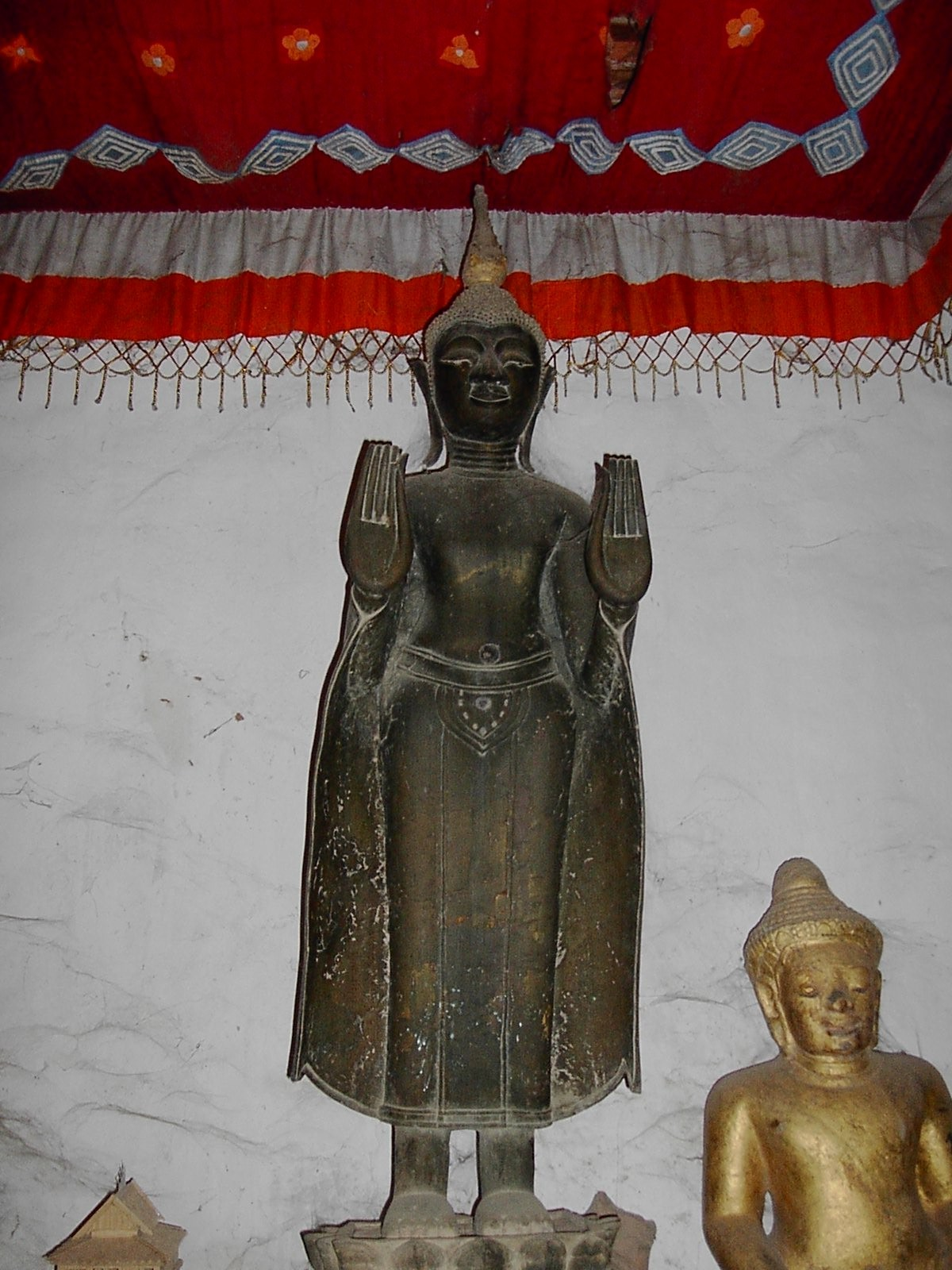
Statue of "the Buddha preaching on reason," with the Buddha's hands in the double abhāya mudrā position (Luang Phrabāng, Laos)

- Reasoning and exposition (Vitarka mudrā): the arm and hand are positioned in the same manner as in the abhāya mudrā, except that the thumb and forefinger are brought together. The gesture can be made with either the right or left hand (usually the right), but not both. This mudra signifies an appeal to reason, or the giving of instruction. Since the Buddha is appealing to reason, the gesture is often interpreted as an appeal for peace.
- Setting the wheel in motion (Dharmachakra mudrā): the hands are held in front of the chest, with both hands in the vitarka mudrā position, with the fingers of the left hand resting in the palm of the right hand. This is a less common mudrā since it refers to a particular episode in the Buddha's life: his first sermon, when he "set the wheel (of his life's work) in motion." It can be used for both seated and standing images.

Over the centuries combinations and variations of these six mudrā have evolved. For example, the "double abhaya mudrā", with both hands held up in the abhaya mudrā position, became common in Thailand and Laos in the 16th century, and is now one of the most common representations of the Buddha in south-east Asian countries. It is sometimes interpreted as "Buddha teaching on reason." As artists wished to depict more of the specific incidents in the life of the Buddha, new, secondary mudrās evolved, such as "Buddha holding an alms bowl", "Buddha receiving a mango" and Buddha performing various miracles. Many of these originated in Burma and then spread to other parts of the Buddhist world.

== Attitudes of Buddha icons in Thai art ==
There are acceptably 80 attitudes (Thai: ปาง, ปางพระพุทธรูป; Paang, Paang Phra Phutta Roupe) existed in Thai art. However, only fews could be commonly founded throughout most temples and amongst those displayed individually. The list below consists of several common paang of Buddha in Thai art.

- Leela attitude: walking attitude of Buddha, believed to be pioneered in the Sukhothai period; according to Thai beliefs, it depicts the Buddha episode of walking down to earth from the heaven.
- Maravijaya attitude: sitting attitude of Buddha with one hand lying down to the ground and the other on his lap
- Meditation attitude: meditating Buddha, the most founded one
- Nirvana Attitude: known as the reclining buddha
- Naga Prok attitude: the seated meditating Buddha with Nāga covering himself

== See also ==
- Budai and its entry for Phra Sangkadchai/Phra Sangkachai, pot-bellied figures sometimes confused with the Buddha, as well as with each other
- Buddha images in Thailand (provides historical perspective)
- Lao Buddhist sculpture
- Easily confused Buddhist representations
- U Thong Style, 12th to 15th century Thailand

== Sources ==
- Gestures of the Buddha, K.I.Matics, Chulalongkorn University Press, Bangkok 2004
- Untitled booklet, Khochone Keomanivong et al., Ho Phra Kaeo Museum, Viang Chan, Laos (undated)
