= Buddhas and bodhisattvas in art =

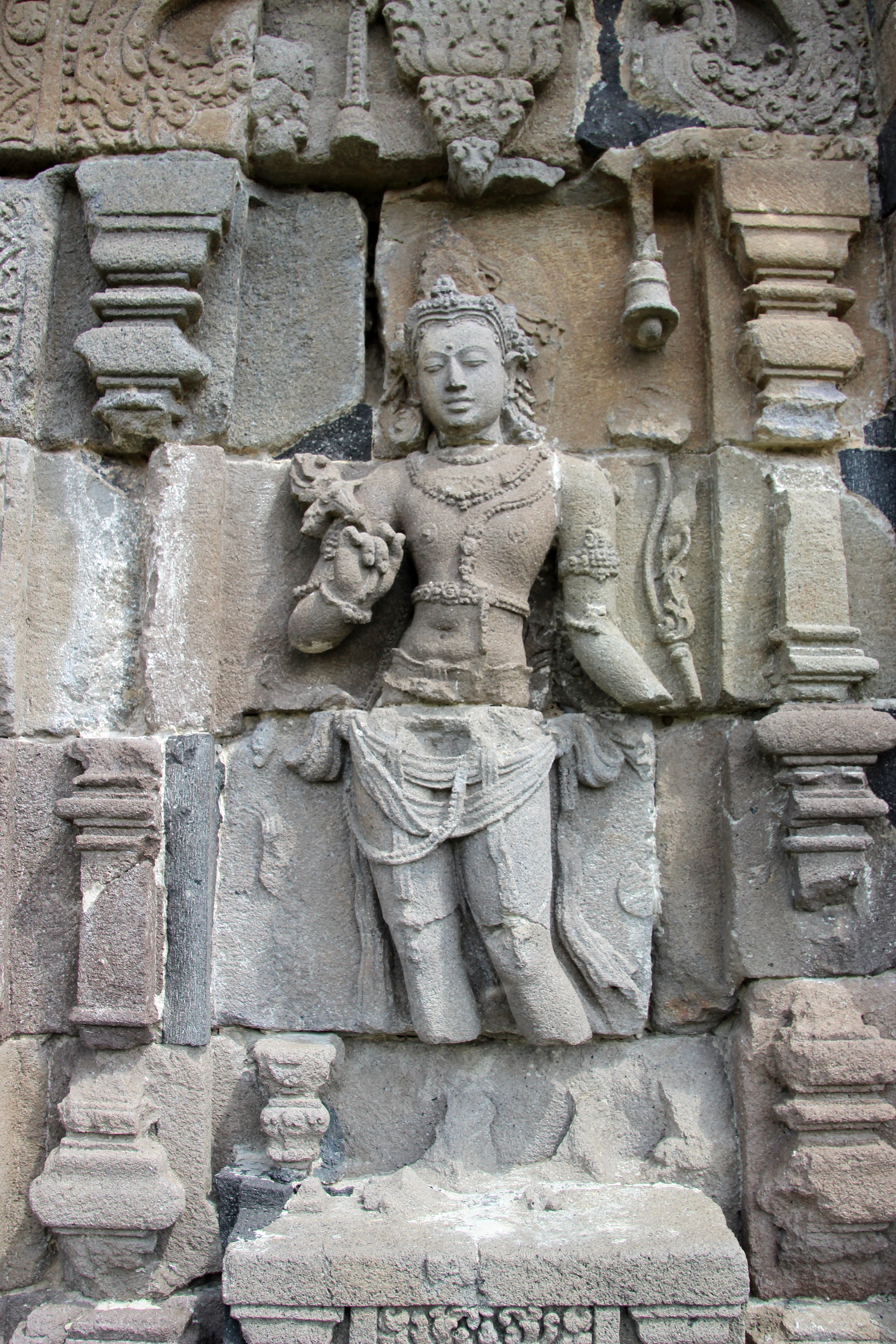
Relief depicting the bodhisattva Avalokiteśvara, Plaosan temple, Java, 9th-century

The many different varieties of Buddhist art often show buddhas and bodhisattvas, as well as depictions of the historical Buddha, known as Gautama Buddha (or Siddhārtha Gautama, Śākyamuni, or Tathāgata).

Especially in Mahayana Buddhism, the main image in a temple or shrine often does not represent the historical Buddha, although the situation is complicated by Buddhist teachings such as trikaya beliefs by which buddhas, including the historical buddha, have different manifestations.

Depictions could be Gautama, or a bodhisattva, guardian, protector, disciple, or saint. Clues to a figure's identity are found in, for example, the physical characteristics of the Buddha, the objects the figure is holding, its mudra (hand gesture), and asana (sitting or standing position of the body). There may be an image in the figure's crown, or the figure could be holding a book, thunderbolt, vase, jewel, or lotus flower or stem.

Mandalas created for Japanese Shingon Buddhism and Tibetan Buddhism can contain hundreds of different figures that may need interpretation. In his paper on the mudrās of bodhisattvas, Carl B. Becker, Kyoto University professor, describes the situation:

When the uninitiated observer first confronts the Buddhist pantheon [of Japan], his reaction may border on bewilderment or dismay. Far from the ascetic agnosticism taught by Gautama, Buddha-like deities are available to answer every material or spiritual need. They wear regal robes or deerskins; they sit, stand, or fly; they have their own sūtras, temples, and guardians....

== Dhyani Buddhas ==
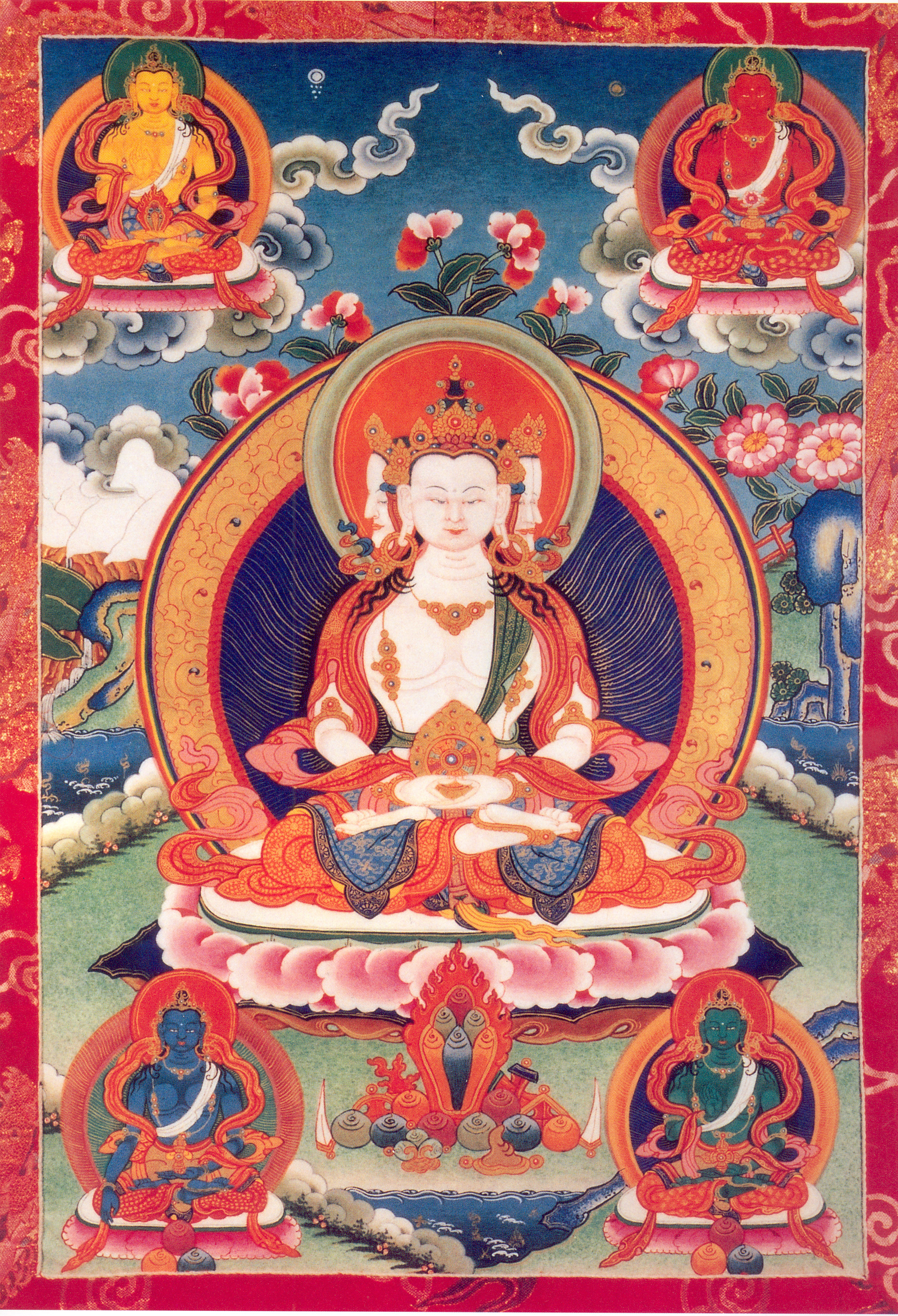
The Five Dhyani Buddhas, unknown provenance

Representations of the five Dhyani Buddhas, who are abstract aspects of Buddhahood rather than Buddhas or gods, have elaborate differences. Each must face in a different direction (north, south, east, west, or center), and, when painted, each is a different color (blue, yellow, red, green, or white). Each has a different mudrā and symbol; embodies a different aspect, type of evil, and cosmic element; has a different consort and spiritual son, as well as different animal vehicles (elephant, lion, peacock, harpys or garuda, or dragon).

Vairocana, the first Dhyani Buddha, embodying sovereignty and occupying the center, is a special case (in any case, he is distinct from Gautama and not normally confused with him). He was one of the Buddhas of Bamiyan blown up by the Taliban which China mourned and tried to replace with the world's tallest statue, named Spring Temple Buddha. Japanese Pure Land Buddhists think that Vairocana and the other Dhyani Buddhas are manifestations of Amitābha, but Japanese Shingon Buddhists think that Amitābha and the other Dhyani Buddhas are manifestations of Vairocana.

Akshobhya, the second Dhyani Buddha who embodies steadfastness and faces east, and Gautama are indistinguishable. Both can be seated in the Vajraparyanka (also known as Bhūmisparśa) pose, with the right hand on the right knee, palm turned inwardly, and middle finger touching the ground. Amitābha (Japanese: Amida) is the most ancient Dhyani Buddha, embodying light and facing west, and is the central figure in Pure Land Buddhism. A statue of Amitābha, when seated, has a samadhi mudrā with both palms face up, on top of each other, in his lap.

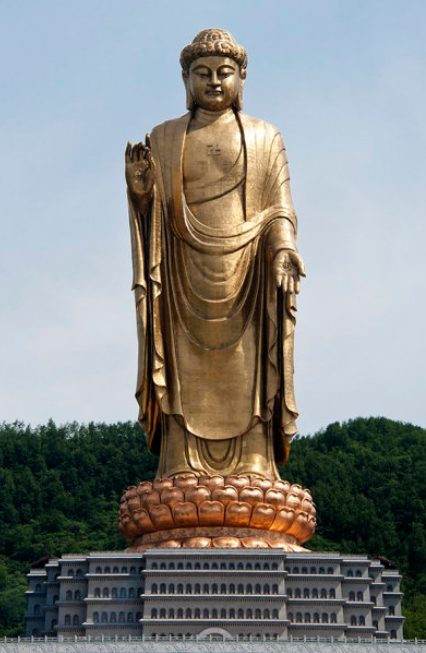
Spring Temple Buddha picturing Vairocana, in Lushan County, Henan, China, is the world's second tallest statue.

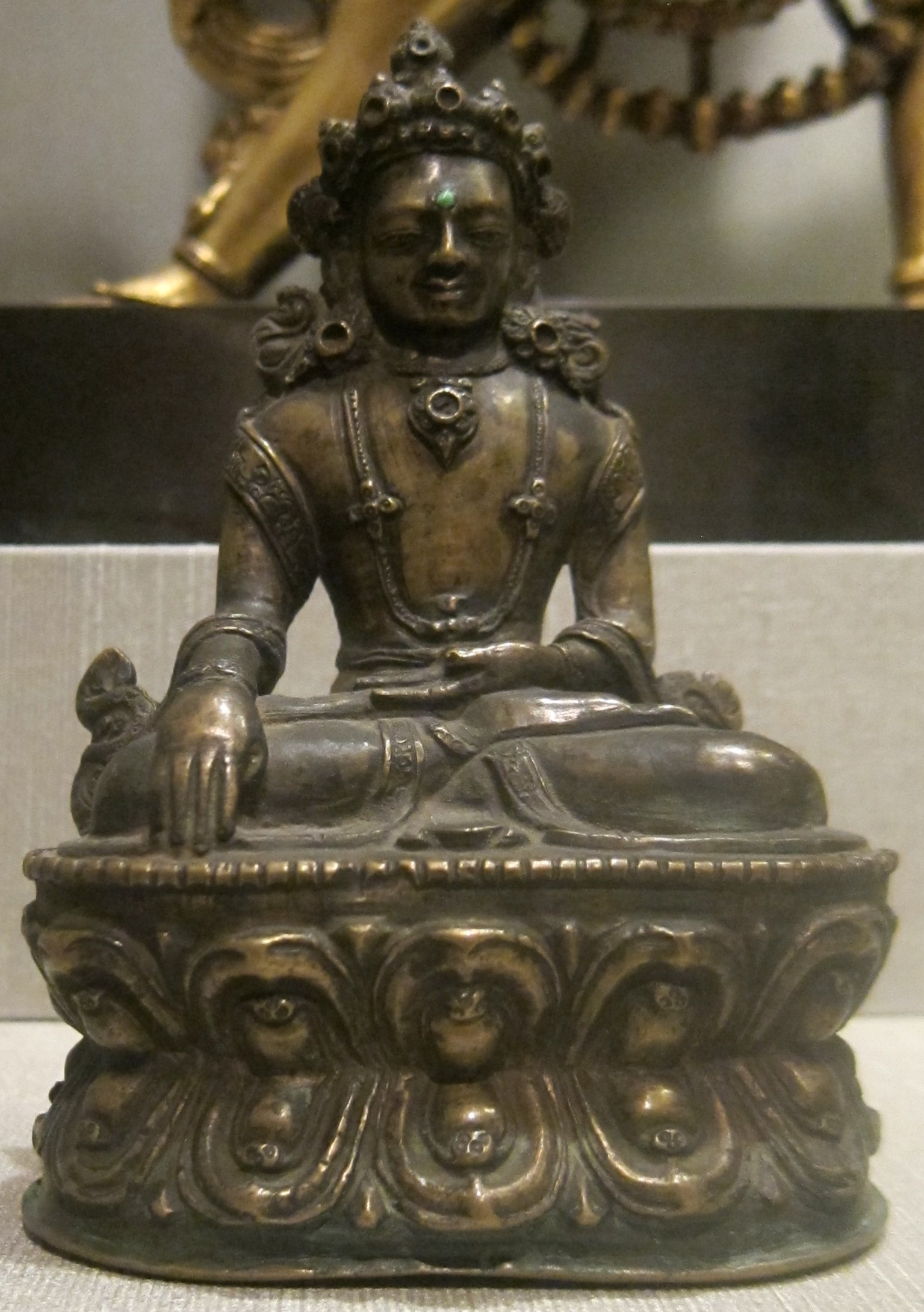
Aksobhya, Tibet, 19th century, Honolulu Museum of Art

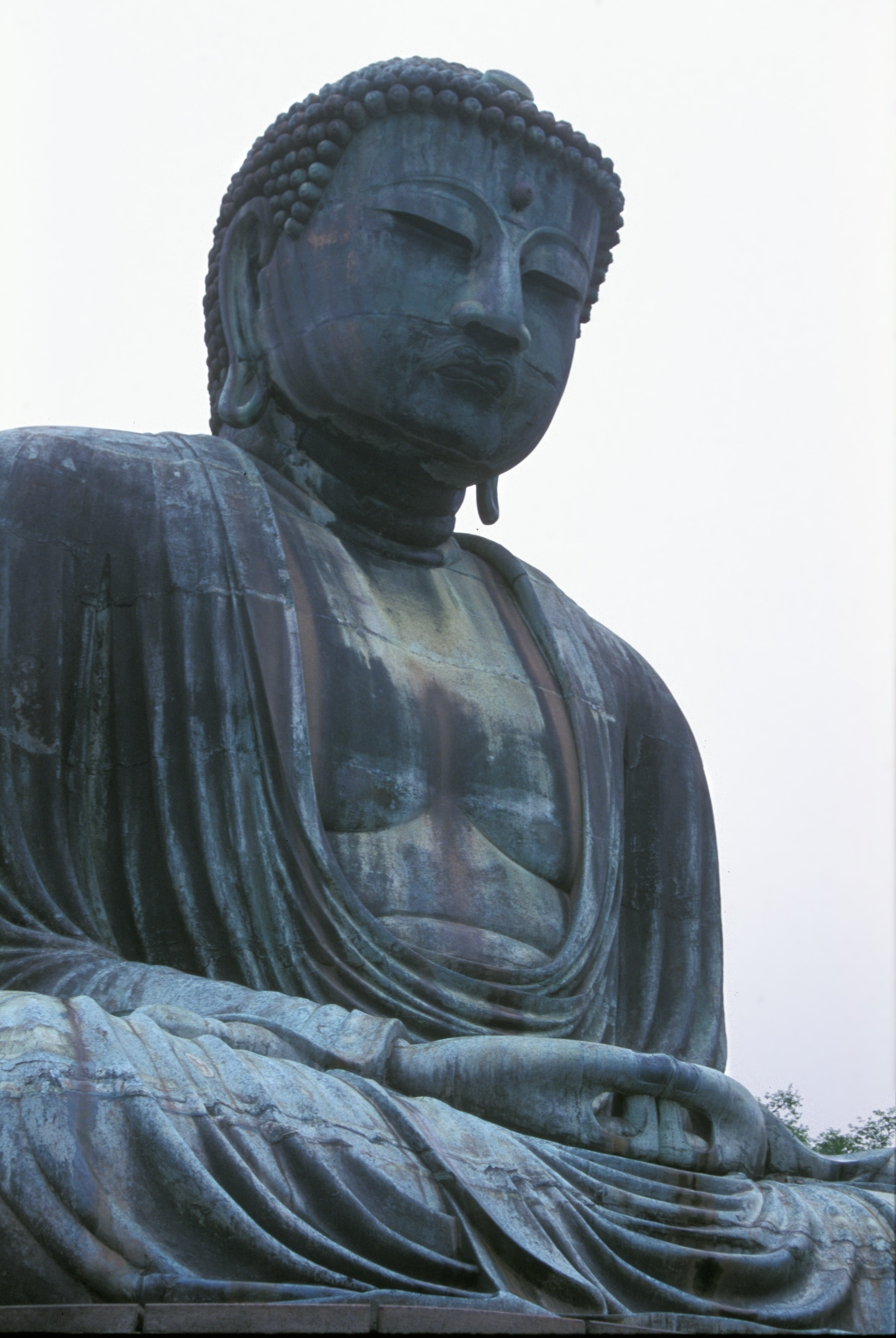
The Great Statue of Buddha Amitabha in Kamakura, Japan

== Bodhisattvas ==
In early Buddhist art, bodhisattvas commonly appeared in pairs flanking Gautama Buddha as protective figures, usually at a smaller scale. But sometimes they were the main figure in an image, and they developed their own iconography. After about 600, they became increasingly prominent, and in art for Vajrayana uses began to replace images of the historical Buddha.

Images of Avalokiteśvara, the bodhisattva of compassion, might be mistaken for Gautama. He is incarnated in the Dalai Lama, who is a tulku and the most revered Tibetan Buddhist monk.

Especially among Westerners, Budai (in Chinese, or Hotei in Japanese) is often confused with Gautama or is thought to have originated Buddhism. He is an incarnation of the bodhisattva and future Buddha, Maitreya, who will come to Earth 4,000 years after Gautama disappears. His name means "Cloth Sack" for the bag of sweets he carries, eats and gives to children. Admired for his happiness and contentment, he is known in Chinese as "The Laughing Buddha" and sometimes in English as "The Fat Buddha".

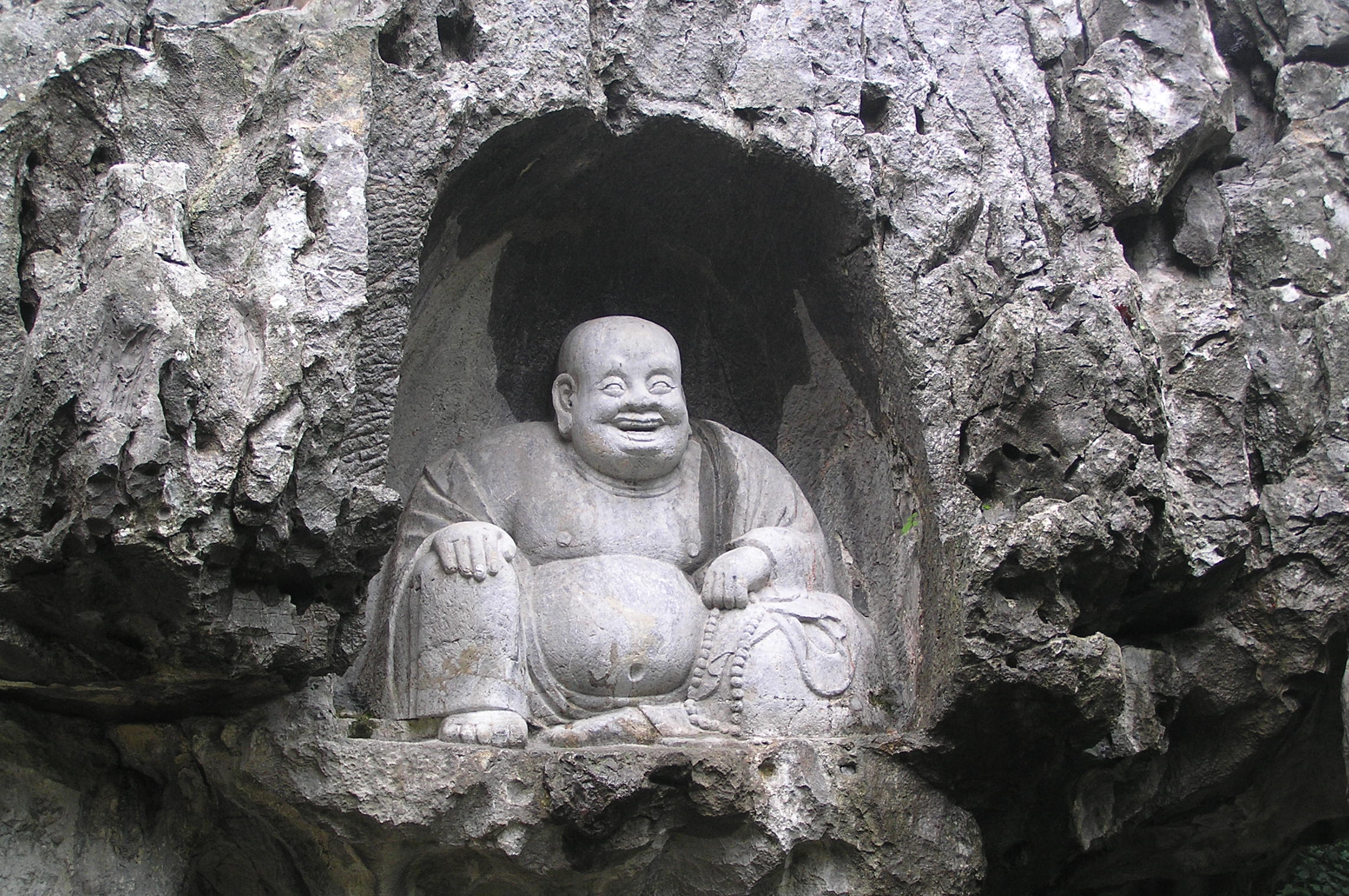
Maitreya incarnated as Budai, The Laughing Buddha, in the Feilai Feng Caves, China

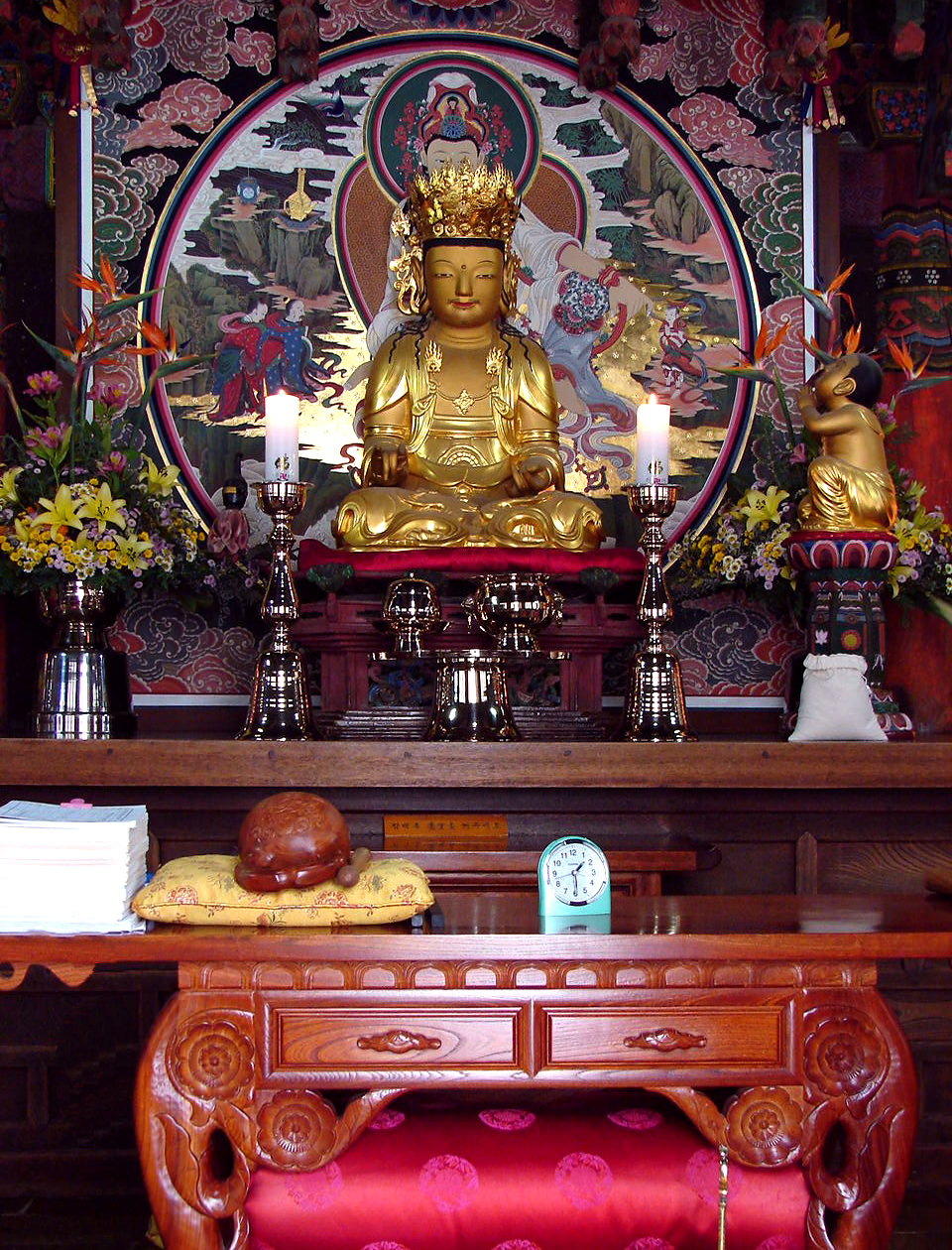
Avalokiteśvara on an altar in North Gyeongsang Province, Korea

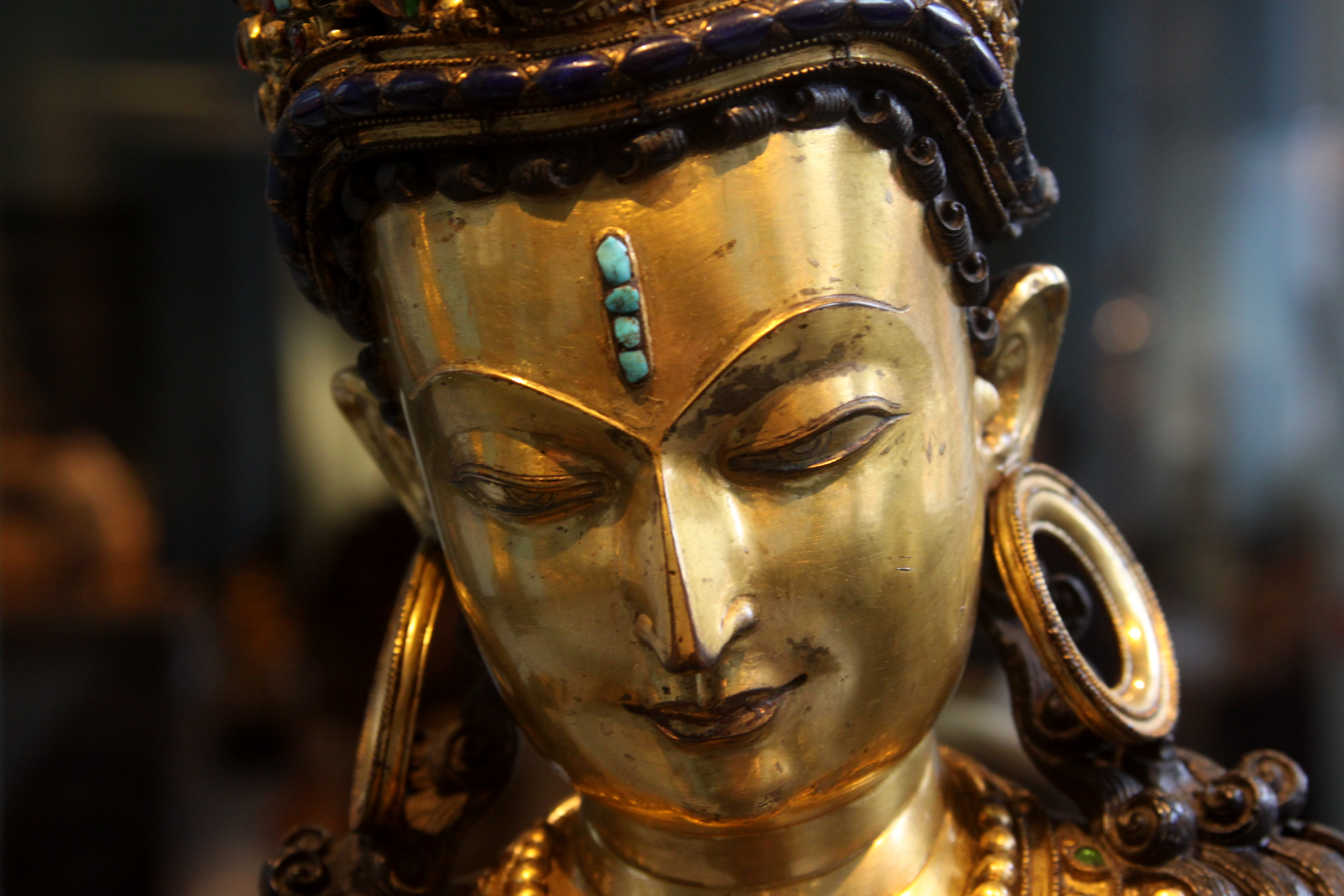
Avalokiteśvara, Nepal, 14th century

== Gautama ==
Gautama might have representations in a hundred different attitudes or positions, of which four follow.

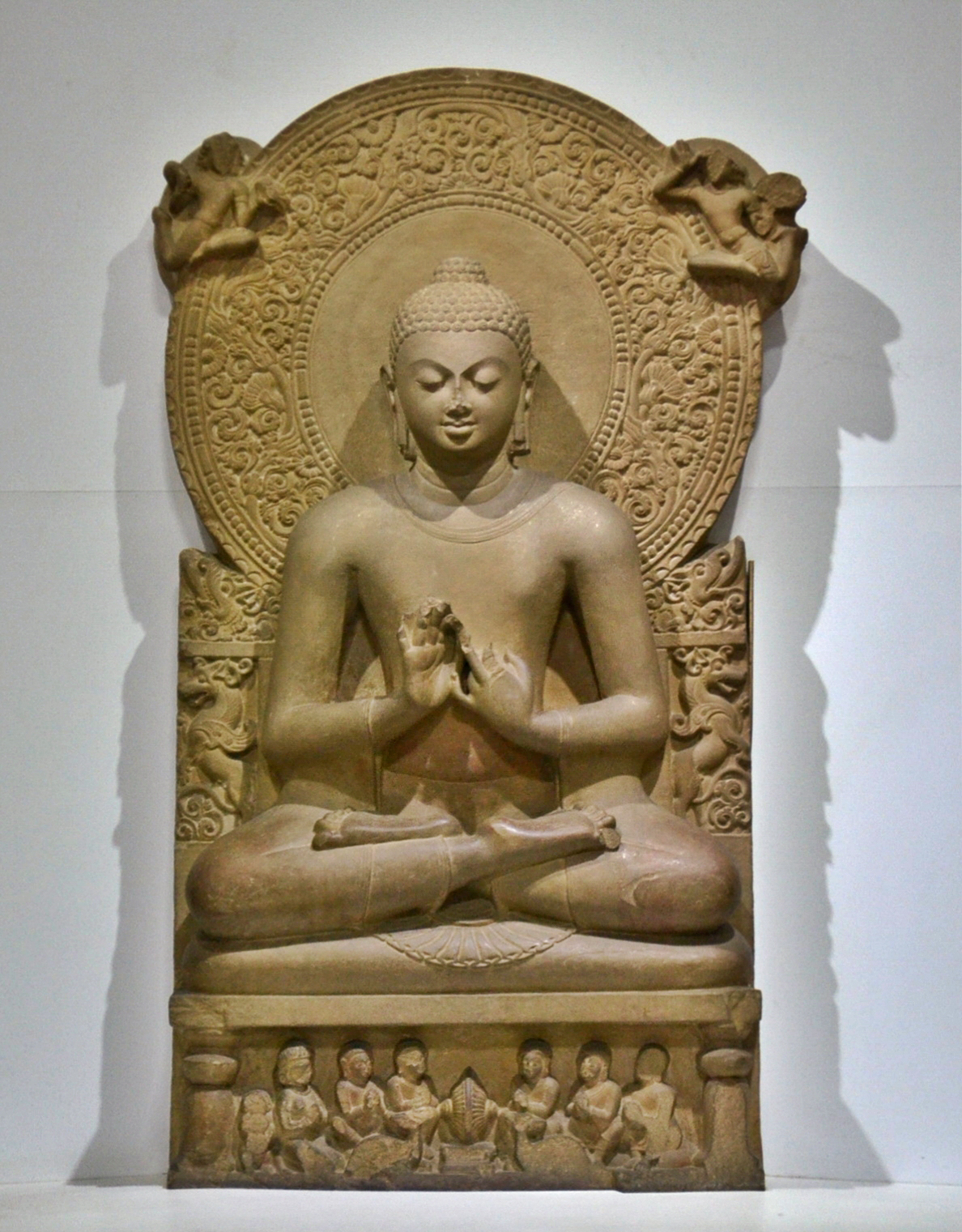
Gautama, with his hands in the dharmachakra or teaching mudrā. Sarnath Museum, India

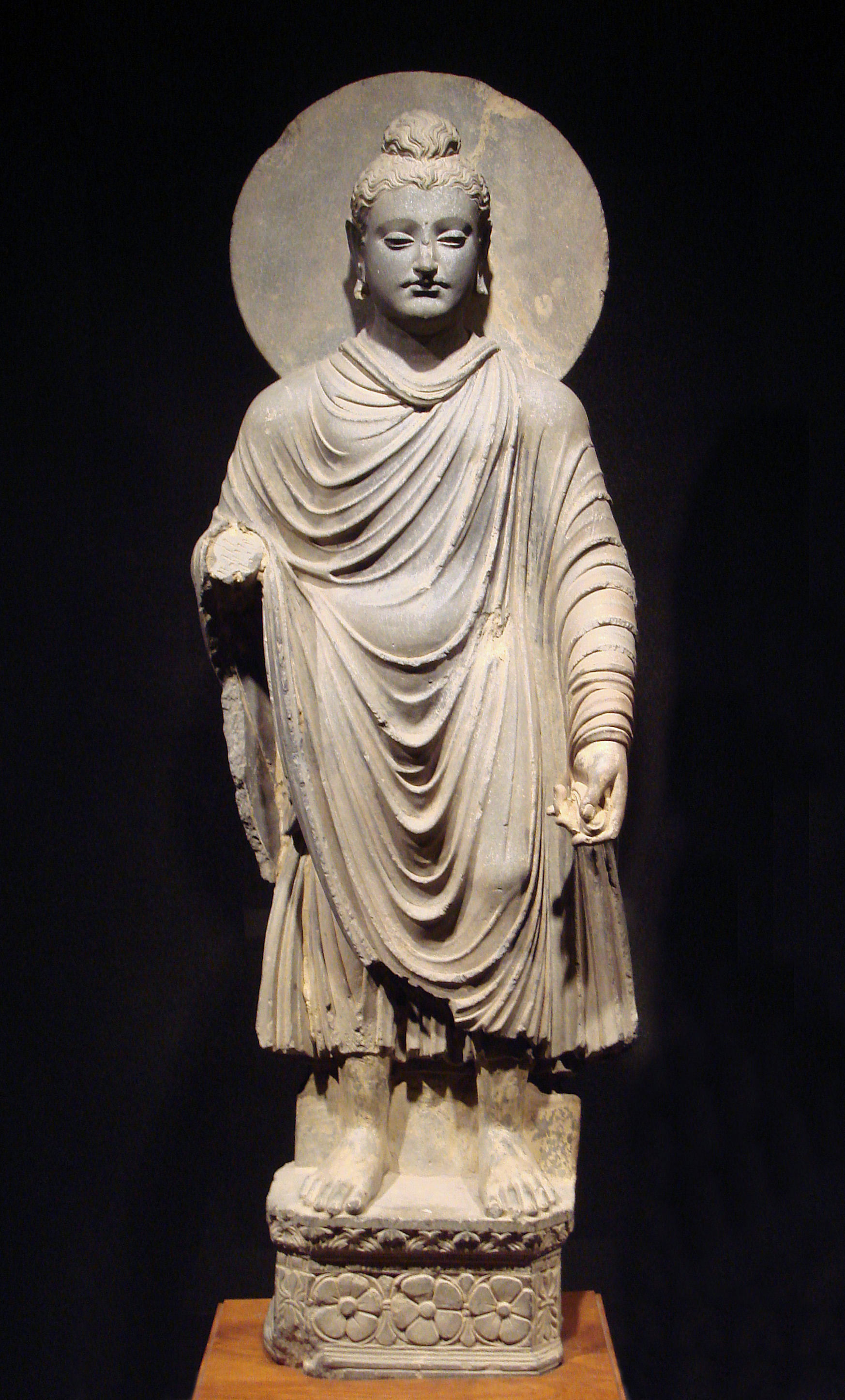
Standing Buddha, 1st–2nd century CE, Tokyo National Museum

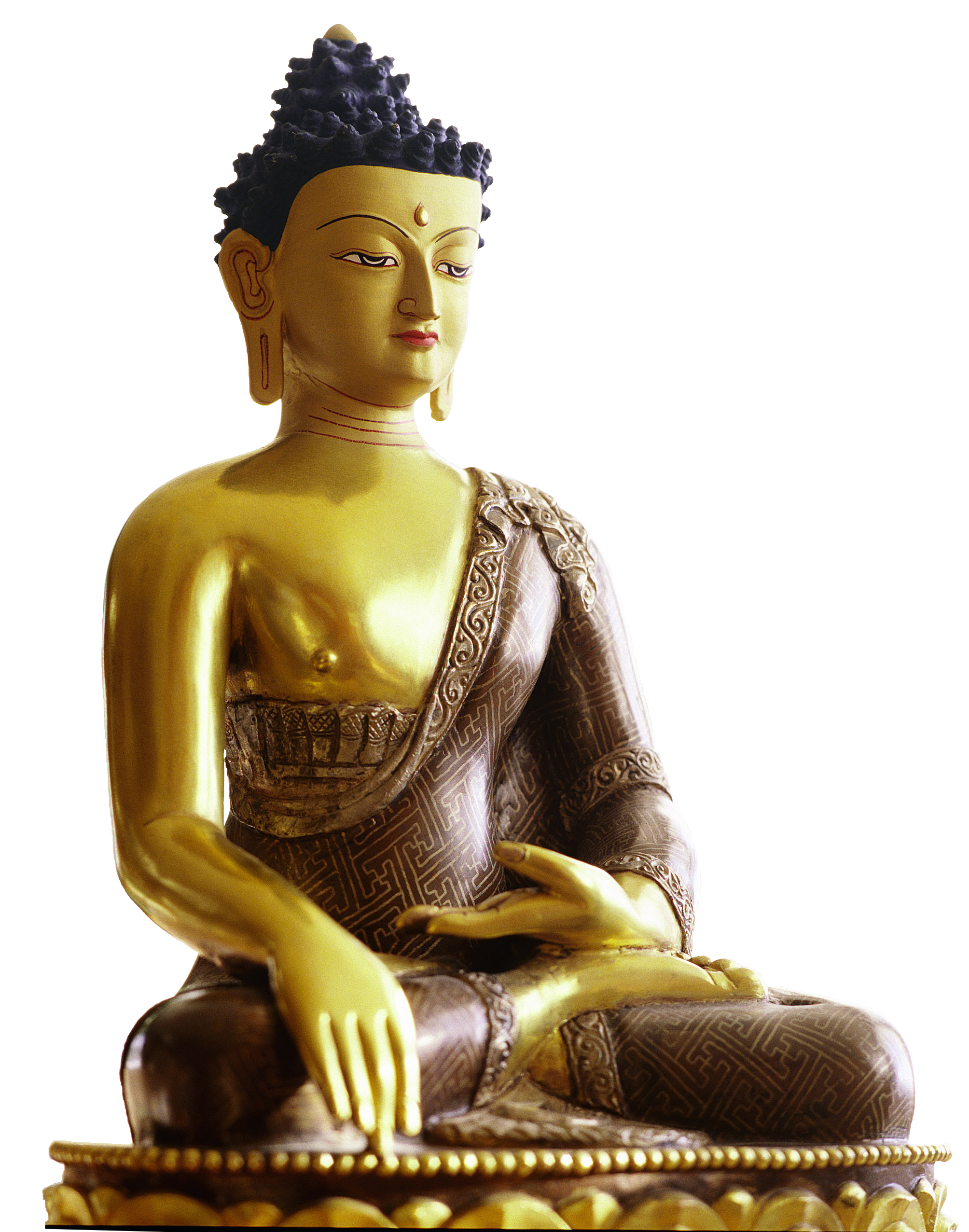
Sitting Buddha in the Vajraparyanka (Bhūmisparśa) position, unknown provenance

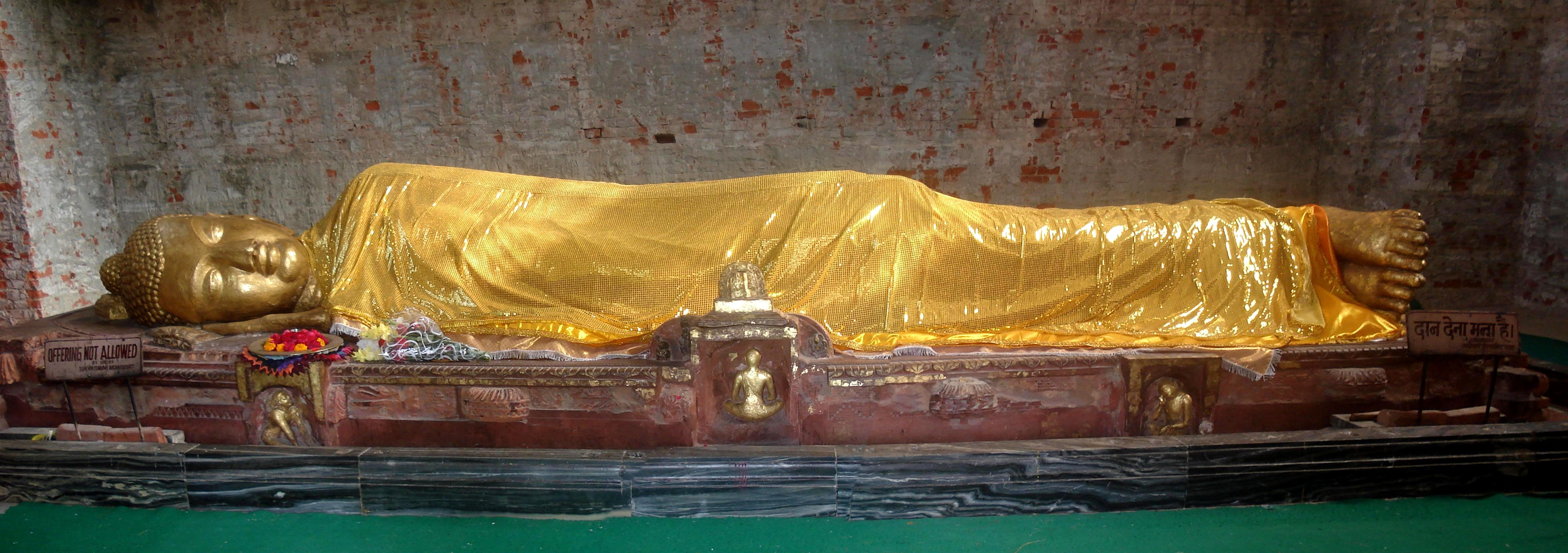
Buddha attaining Parinirvana. Statue excavated at the Mahaparinirvana Temple in Kushinagar, Uttar Pradesh, India

== See also ==
- Iconography of Gautama Buddha in Laos and Thailand
