= Meditation attitude =

Position of the Buddha

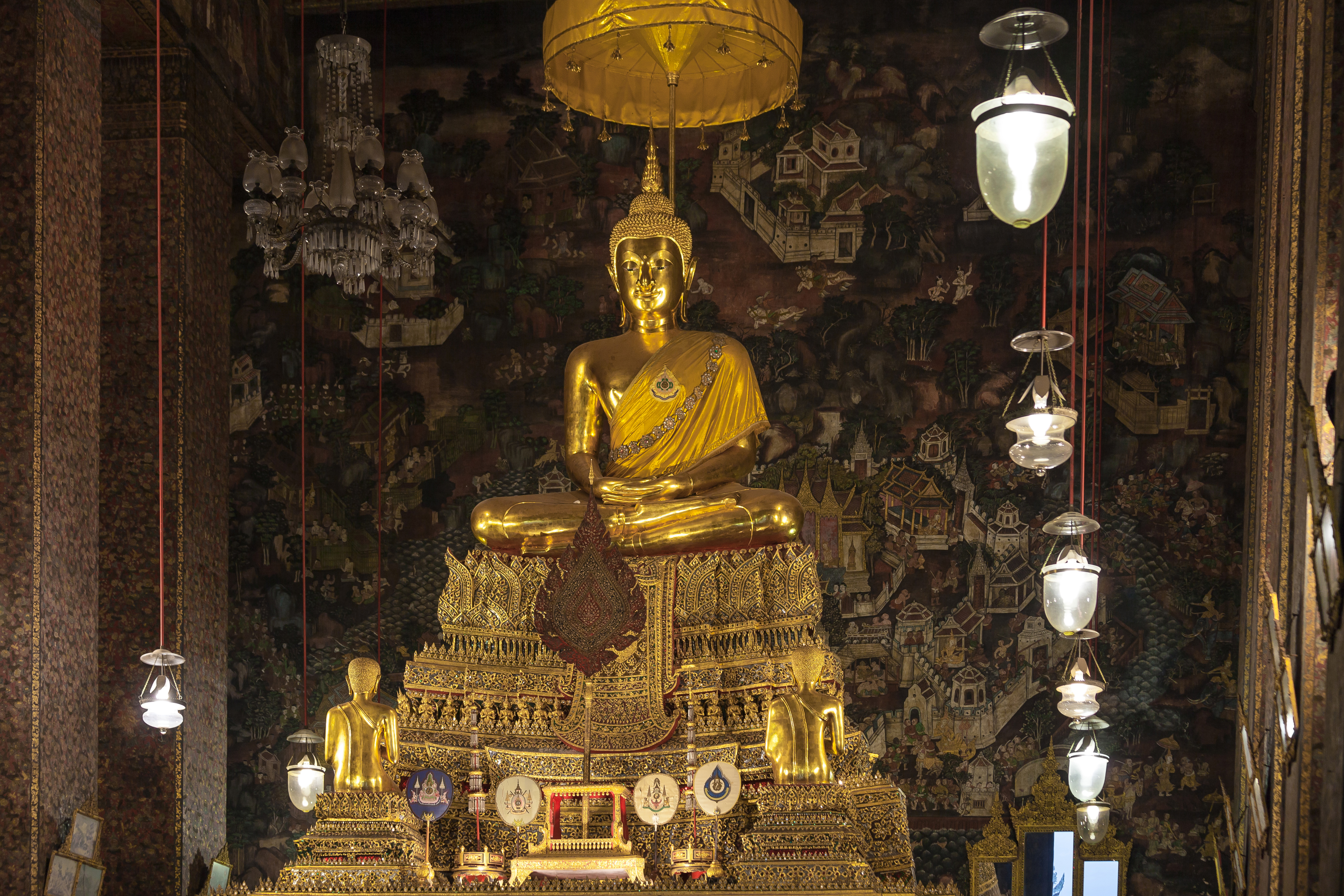
The Mediating Buddha of Wat Pho's ubosot

The meditation attitude, also known as meditating Buddha, is an attitude of Buddha in which the seated Buddha rests both upturned hands on his lap, the right hand usually on top. His eyes are closed. The attitude refers to an episode where he reached enlightenment, meditating in this posture under the Bodhi tree.

Not to be confused with the other common seated Buddha called maravijaya attitude, the meditation attitude has both hands on his lap, whilst the maravijaya has only one hand on the lap.

== Names ==
The attitude is known by various names throughout Southeast Asia, including as preah pud (buddha) samathi (Khmer: ព្រះពុទ្ធសម្មាធិ) in Cambodia, thamadhi mudra (Burmese: သမာဓိမုဒြာ; samādhi mudrā) in Myanmar, and pang samathi (Thai: ปางสมาธิ; RTGS: pang samathi) in Thailand.

Other names in Thai are "reaching enlightenment attitude" (ปางตรัสรู้; paang trassaruu) or the "first attitude" (ปฐมปาง; pathom paang). The attitude has another version called "Diamond Mediation attitude" (ปางขัดสมาธิเพชร; paang kud sa ma thi petch), in which the position of his feet differs from this one.

== Gallery ==
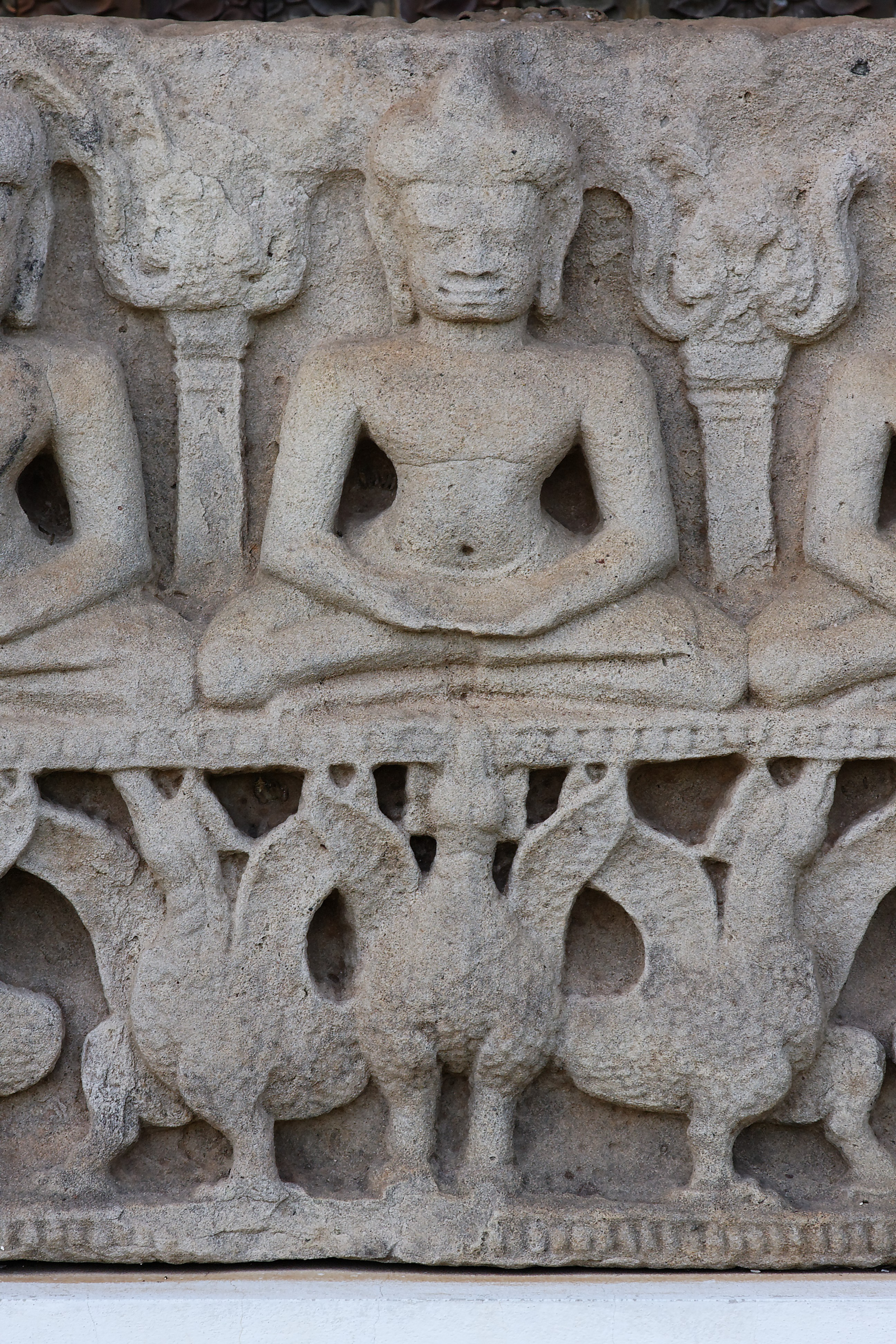
Khmer mediation Buddha from Prasat Phimai lintel, 11th-12th Century CE, Nakhon Ratchasima province, Thailand.

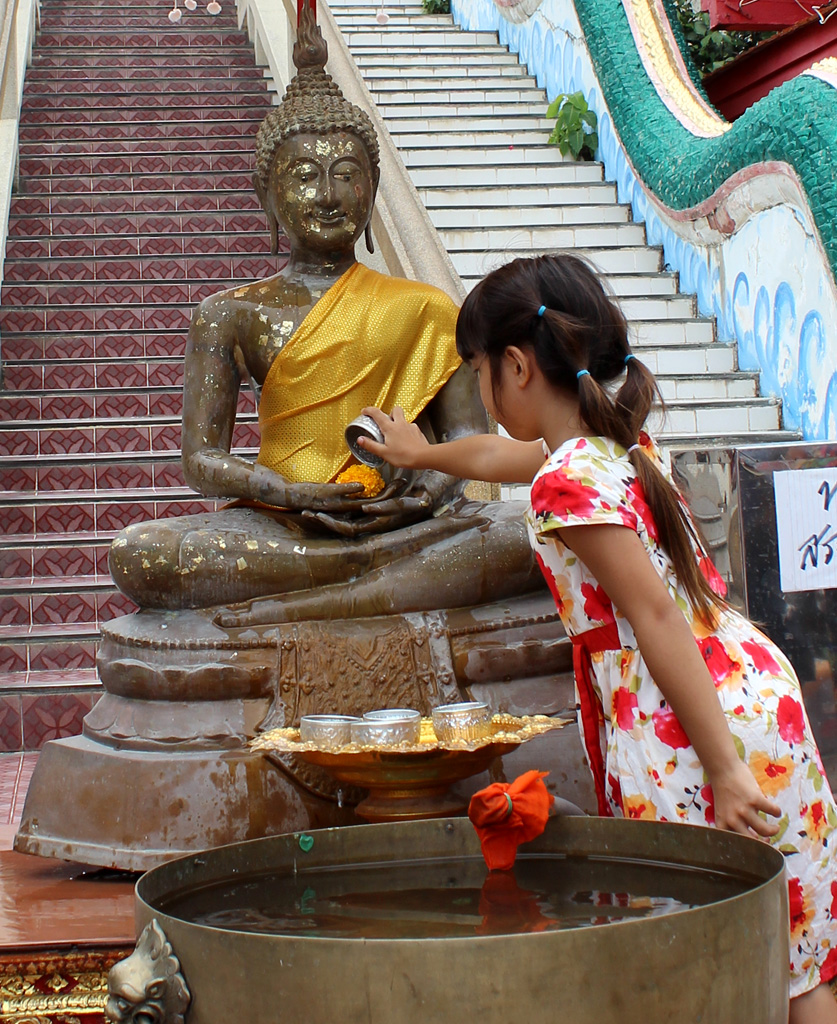
at Wat Phra Yai, Koh Samui

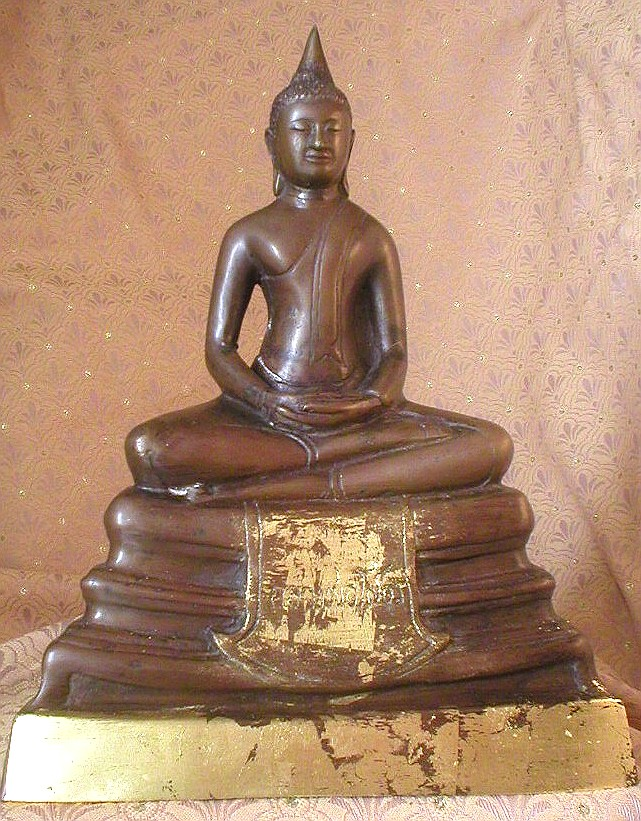

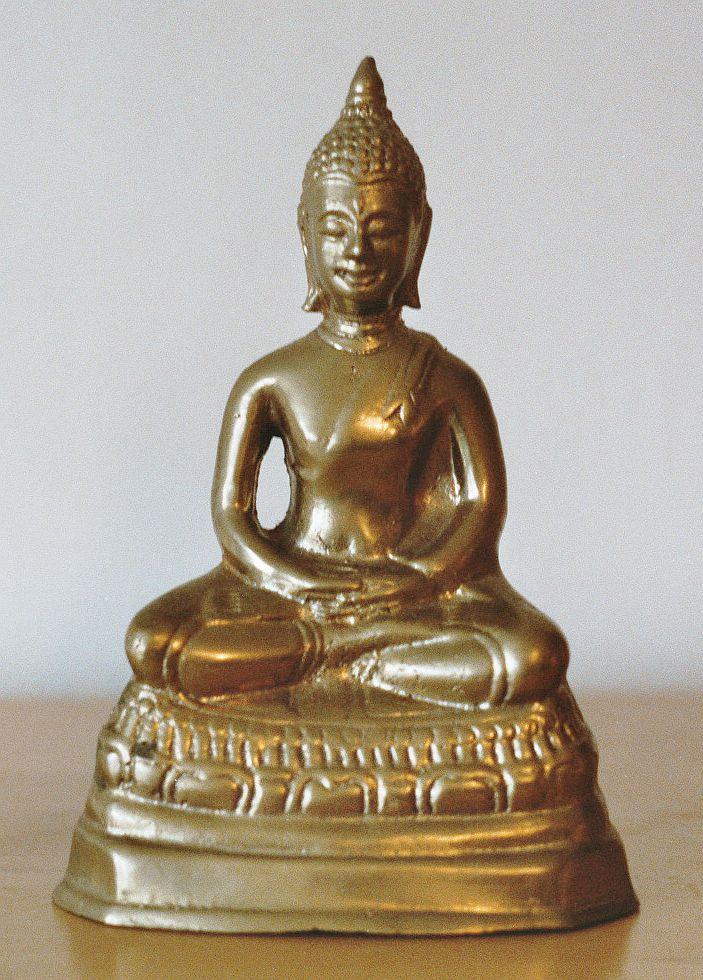

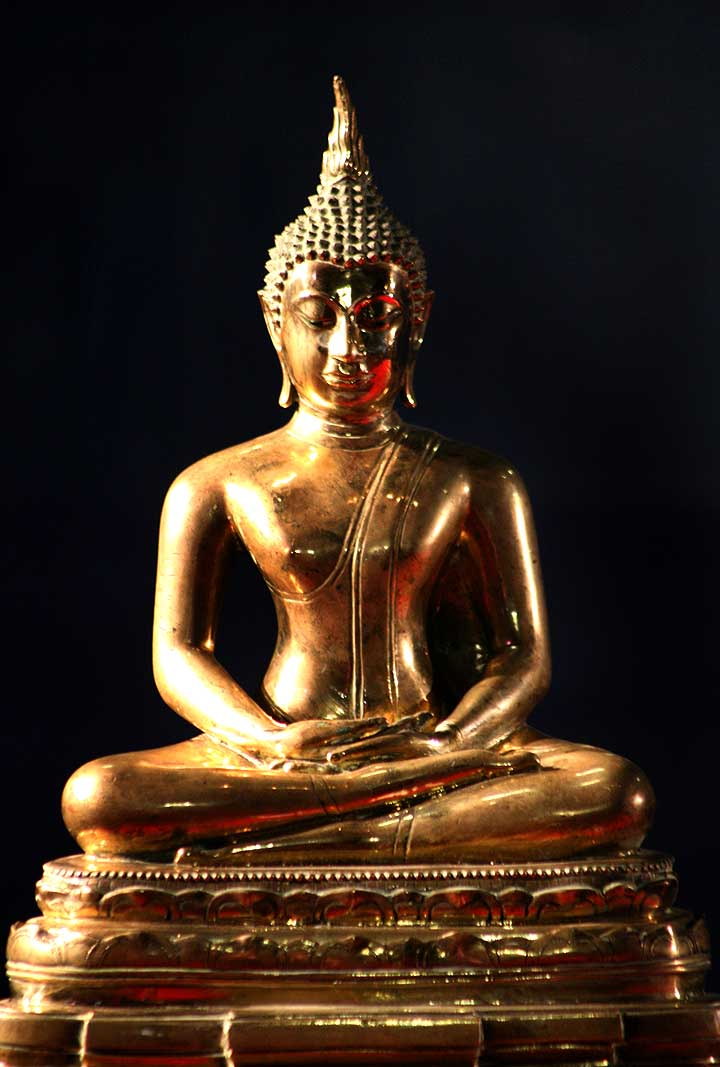

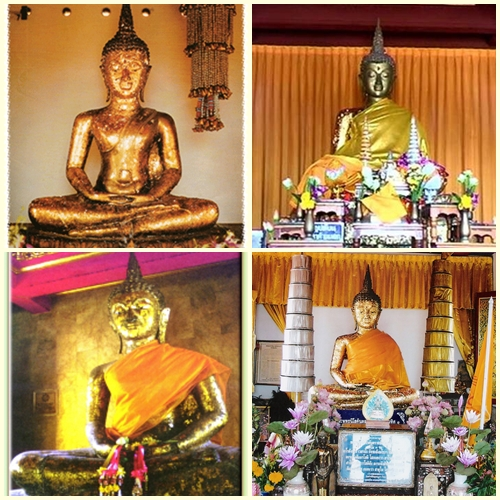
Phra Phutta Nira Rokhan Taraya Chayawattana of four directions

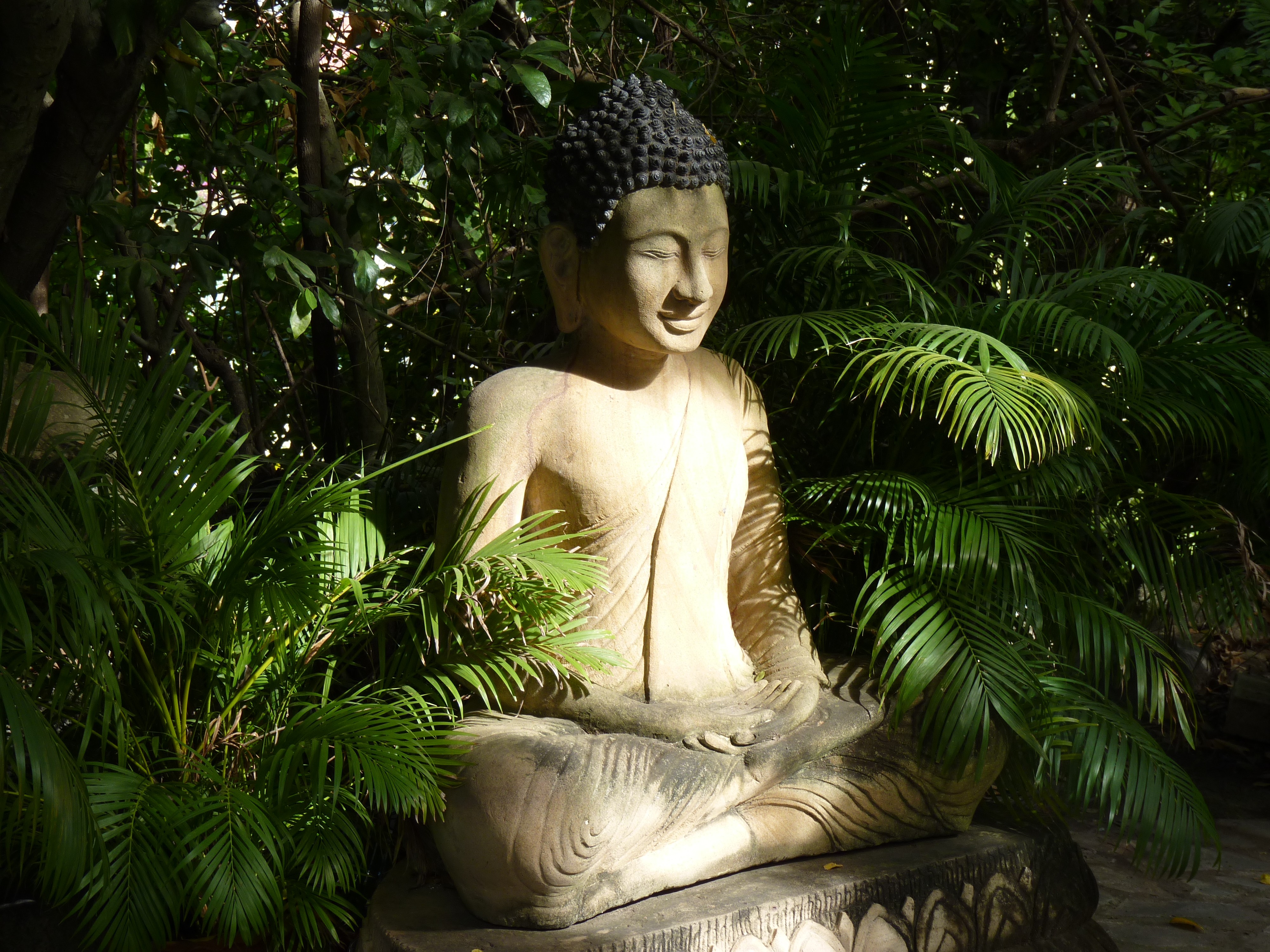
Khmer mediation Buddha in the garden of Silver Pagoda .
