= U Thong Style =

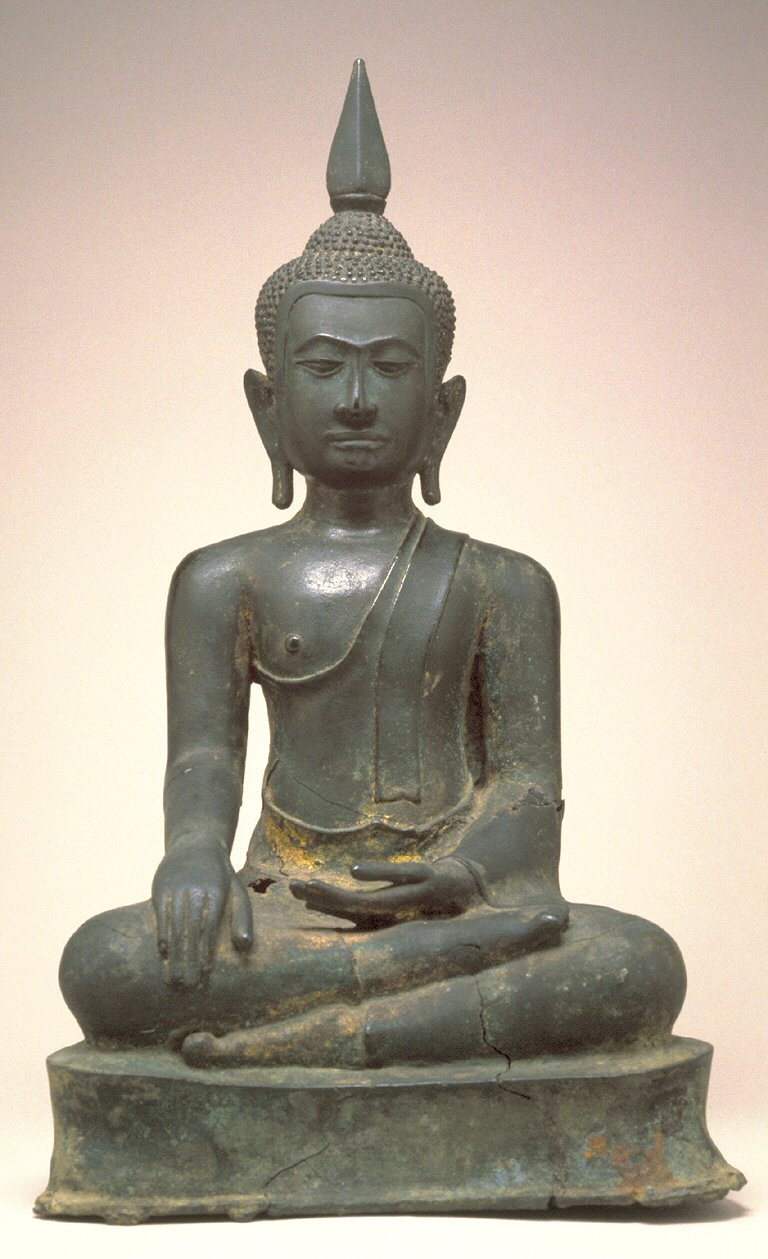
U-Thong style sculpture; found in Ayutthaya and dated in the early 15th century

The U Thong Style is one of the definitive styles for Buddha icons which developed in Thailand (Siam) in the southern capital of Ayutthaya. There are three distinct periods for the style, 12th to 13th century, 13th to 14th century and 13th to the 15th century, with some obvious overlap.

Features common to all three types include:

- Small band between the hairline and forehead
- Robe draped with a long flap from the left shoulder ending in a straight line
- Fingers of unequal length
- Hairstyle is small, somewhat-spiky curls
- Seated, with the legs folded
- Simple concave base

== History of the style ==
To retain the greatest spiritual potency, Buddha icons in Thai temples had to resemble as closely as possible an original prototype that tradition erroneously believed had been made during the lifetime of the Buddha. Of the three major efforts by Thai kings to establish an "authentic" canon for the icons, the Sukhothai style was the first, followed by the U Thong and the lion types.

The populace of Southern Thailand, which captured Sukhothai in approximately 1350, was in the 14th century still largely Mon, and the fusion of styles resulted in the more solid, corporeal, and squared-off U Thong image. Although the resulting changes may be seen most readily in the shape of the head, now more square than oval, and the broader, more sober features, there is also an increased heaviness of the body, no longer weightless but firmly seated on the ground.

While the Sukhothai style is characterized by linear emphasis, the U Thong style again shows concern for solidity and modeling. At the same time, the U Thong images are rather stolid and lack the linear excitement and uniquely Thai character of Sukhothai art. U Thong style, like Sukhothai style, is still copied in Thailand.
