= Mucilinda =

Nāga who protected Śākyamuni Buddha from the elements after his enlightenment

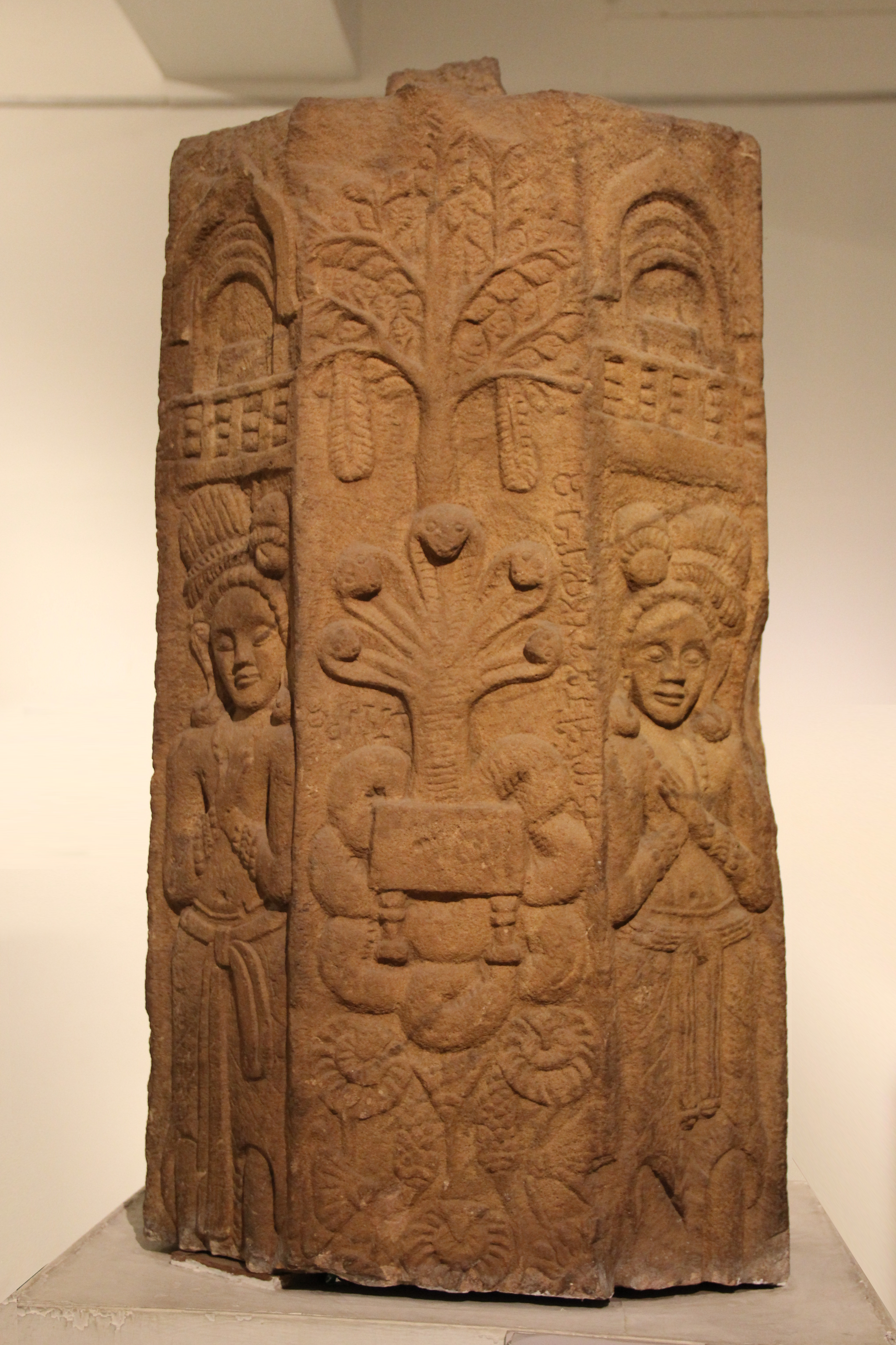
Pillar with Naga Mucalinda protecting the throne of the Buddha. Railing pillar from Jagannath Tekri, Pauni (Bhandara District). 2nd-1st century BCE. National Museum of India.

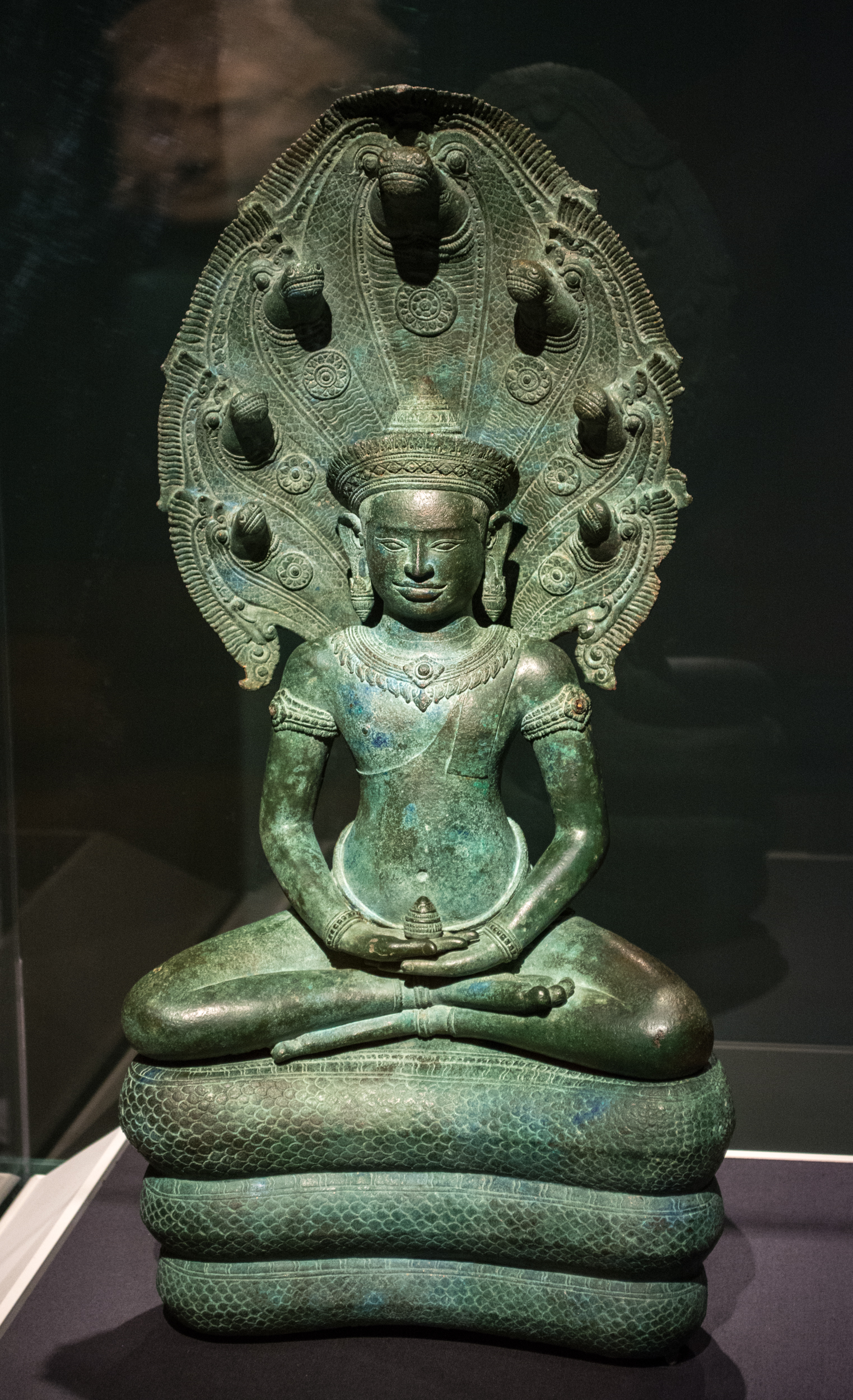
12th century Khmer bronze Naga-enthroned Buddha from Banteay Chhmar, Cambodia. Cleveland Museum of Art.

Mucilinda (Sanskrit: मुचिलिन्द; Pali: Mucalinda) is a nāga who protected Śākyamuni Buddha from the elements after his enlightenment.

It is said that six weeks after Gautama Buddha began meditating under the Bodhi Tree, the heavens darkened for seven days, and a prodigious rain descended. However, the mighty King of Serpents, Mucilinda, came from beneath the earth and protected with his hood the One who is the source of all protection. When the great storm had cleared, the serpent king assumed his human form, bowed before the Buddha, and returned in joy to his palace.

== Development ==
Mucalinda first appears in the Mucalinda Sutta, where it is described that the naga king protected Buddha from the elements by encircling Buddha's body seven times with his coils and standing with his hood spread over. After Buddha finished meditating and the sky cleared, Mucalinda adopted the form of a youth and bowed before him.

The first existent artwork depicting Mucalinda comes from a 2nd-century BC stupa in Pauni, Maharashtra, where the naga is portrayed as having five heads and guarding Buddha's empty seat. Contemporaneous artwork from Sanchi has him portrayed in zoo-anthropomorphic form and attended by a retinue of nagini. Generally statues and carvings of Muchalinda depicts him with seven heads, as discovered at the Ta Prohm-temple in Cambodia, in September 2024.

== Mahayana ==
According to the Lalitavistara Sutra, the Buddha found himself in the domain of Mucilinda five weeks after his enlightenment. Mucilinda, along with nāgas from the four cardinal directions, approached him and coiled around his body seven times to shelter him from the inclement weather. They did so for seven days and seven nights. After the storm had let up, the nāgas returns to their respective domains and Mucilinda paid homage to the Buddha, circumambulating him three times before departing.

== Artistic representations ==
The subject of the Buddha meditating under the protection of Mucalinda is very common in Lao Buddhist art. A particularly striking gigantic modern rendition is present in Bunleua Sulilat's sculpture park Sala Keoku.

Art depicting the Buddha with Mucalinda's hood over him might have been influenced by Jain art of Parshvanatha, himself depicted as a man with a cobra-like hood.

== See also ==
- Vasuki
- Shesha
