= Wat Khaek =

Wat Khaek (Thai: วัดแขก) is an unofficial term meaning Indian's temple. It is composed of two words; wat meaning religious place, and khaek meaning "of Indian/south Asian/muslim race/culture". It may refer to:

- Sri Mariamman Temple, Bangkok, Hindu temple in Bangkok
- Sala Keoku, park in Nong Khai, Thailand
