= Wat Rong Khun =

Art exhibit of a Buddhist temple in Chiang Rai, Thailand

Coordinates: 19°49.480′N 99°45.800′E

- วัดร่องขุ่น
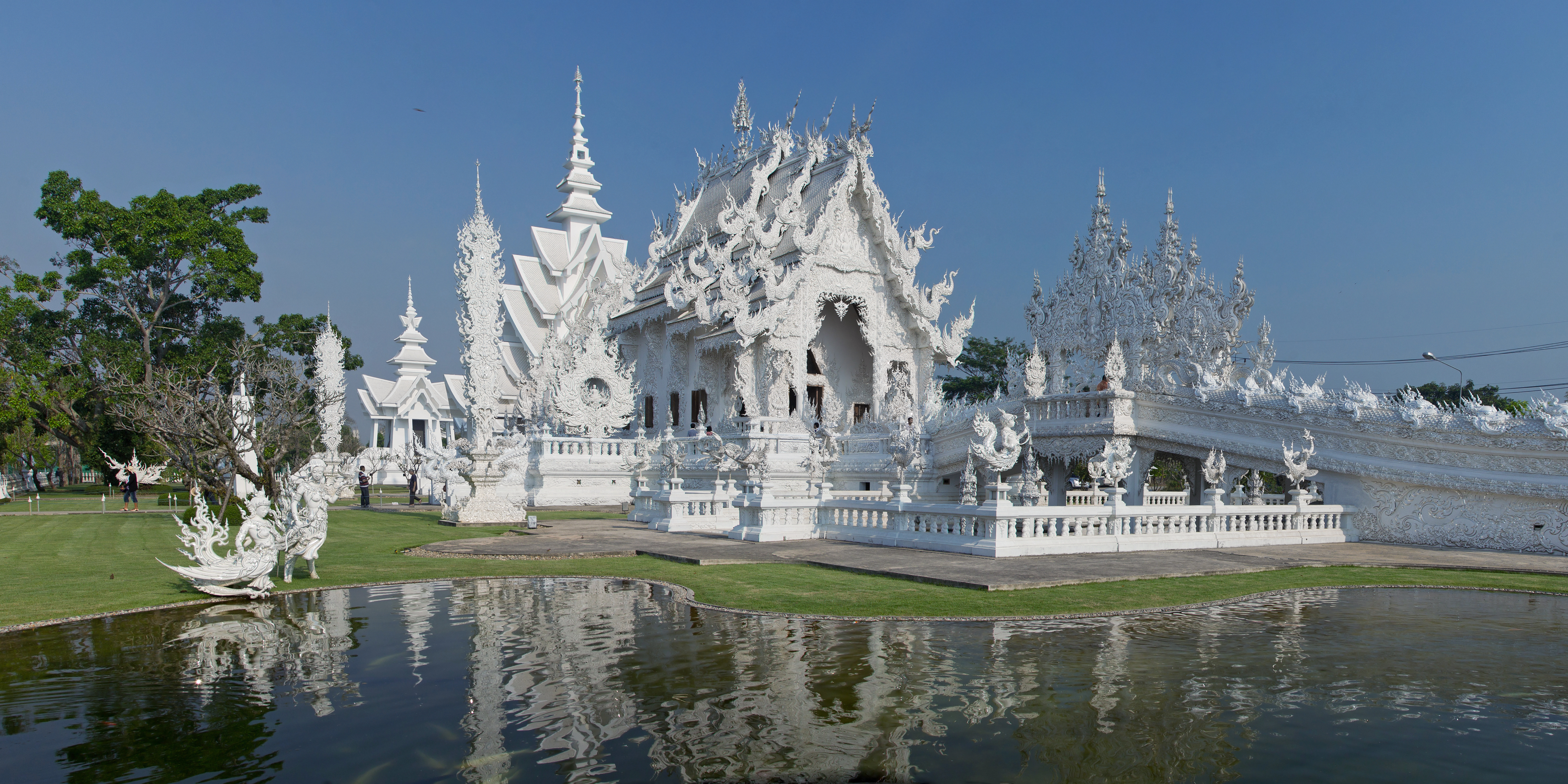

Religion
- Affiliation: Theravada Buddhism
- Province: Chiang Rai

Location
- Location: Pa O Don Chai, Mueang District, Chiang Rai, Thailand
- Interactive map of Wat Rong Khun

Architecture
- Architect: Chalermchai Kositpipat
- Style: Thai Modern Architecture; Lanna Architecture
- Founder: Chalermchai Kositpipat
- Completed: 1997

Website
- www.tourismthailand.org/Attraction/wat-rong-khun

Wat Rong Khun (Thai: วัดร่องขุ่น), better known as the White Temple, is a contemporary, privately owned art exhibit in the style of a Buddhist temple in Pa O Don Chai, Mueang District, Chiang Rai province, Thailand. Situated outside the city of Chiang Rai, the site attracts a large number of visitors, both Thai and foreign, making it one of Chiang Rai's most visited attractions. The White Temple was created by master Chalermchai Kositpipat, the national artist who designed, constructed, and opened it to visitors in 1997.

The primary structure of the temple is made of a basic concrete frame and a wooden roof. Viewed from a distance, it appears to be crafted from sparkling porcelain, but on closer inspection it becomes evident that the dazzling effect is achieved through a blend of whitewash and transparent mirrored chips. The outer surfaces are adorned with white plaster and incorporated glass inserts.

== History ==
By the end of the 20th century, the original Wat Rong Khun was in a bad state of repair. Funds were not available for renovation. Chalermchai Kositpipat, a local artist from Chiang Rai, decided to completely rebuild the temple and fund the project with his own money. To date, Chalermchai has spent over 40 million THB of his own money on the project. The artist intends for the area adjacent to the temple to be a center of learning and meditation and for people to gain benefit from the Buddhist teachings. Kositpipat considers the temple to be an offering to Lord Buddha and believes the project will give him immortal life. Today the works are ongoing, but are not expected to be completed until 2070.

== Structures and symbolism ==
When completed, the white temple compound will have nine buildings, including the existing ubosot, a hall of relics, a meditation hall, an art gallery, and living quarters for monks.

=== Bridge of "the cycle of rebirth" ===
The main building at the white temple, the ubosot, is reached by crossing a bridge over a small lake. In front of the bridge are hundreds of outreaching hands that symbolize unrestrained desire. The bridge symbolizes the way to happiness—by foregoing temptation, greed, and desire. Next to the lake stand two Kinnaree, half-human, half-bird creatures from Buddhist mythology.

=== Gate of heaven ===
After crossing the bridge, the visitor arrives at the "gate of heaven", guarded by two creatures representing Death and Rahu, who decides the fate of the dead. In front of the ubosot are several meditative Buddha images.

=== Golden building ===
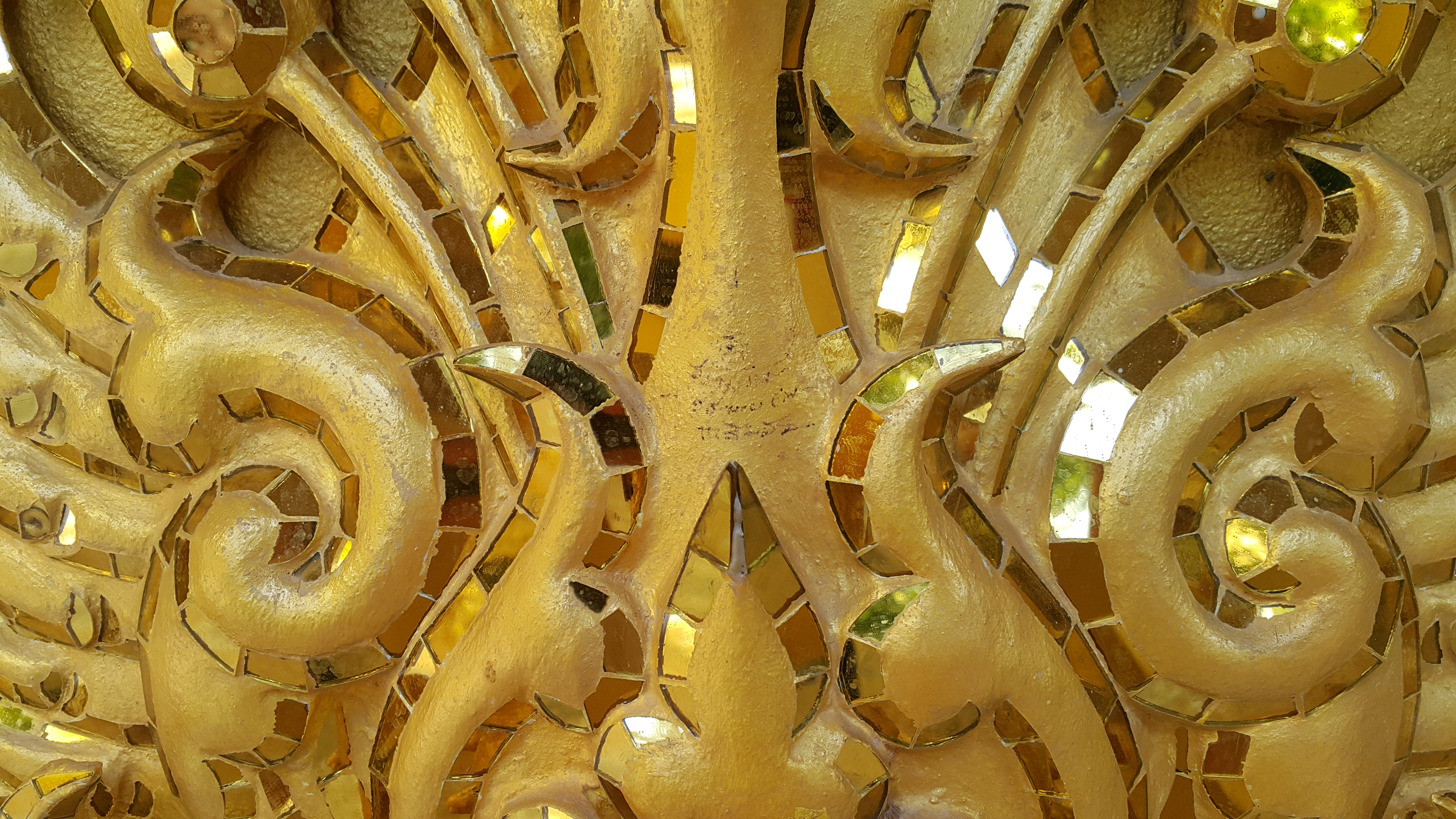
The signature of Chalermchai Kositpipat on his work, the golden building at Wat Rong Khun

A structure that stands out because of its color is the rest rooms building. Another very ornately decorated structure, this golden building represents the body, whereas the white ubosot represents the mind. The gold symbolizes how people focus on worldly desires and money. The white building represents the idea to make merit and to focus on the mind, instead of material things and possession.

=== Ubosot ===
The principal building, the ubosot, is an all-white building with fragments of mirrored glass embedded in its exterior. It embodies design elements from classic Thai architecture, such as the three-tiered roof and abundant use of Nāga serpents. Inside the temple, the decor swiftly moves from pristine white to fiery and bewildering. Murals depict swirling orange flames and demon faces, interspersed with Western idols such as Michael Jackson, Neo from The Matrix, Freddy Krueger, and a T-800 series Terminator. Images of nuclear warfare, terrorist attacks such as the World Trade Center attack, and oil pumps hammer home the destructive impact that humans have had on earth. The presence of Harry Potter, Superman, and Hello Kitty confuses the message somewhat, but the overall moral is clear: people are wicked.

== 2014 earthquake ==
On 5 May 2014 at 18:08 (local time), the temple was damaged by the earthquake in Mae Lao that struck the province. It was planned to be closed indefinitely. Chalermchai said on 6 May that he would demolish the structures for safety reasons and would not rebuild it.

On May 7, after an engineering expert team inspected and affirmed that all buildings in the compound were structurally unharmed by the quake, Chalermchai announced that he would restore the temple to its original state in two years and promised to devote his life to the work. He also announced that the temple area will be open to visitors from 8 May. The gallery building opened shortly thereafter. But for some buildings, specifically, ubosot itself, visitors are only allowed to take pictures outside.

== Visiting ==
The structure is open year-round. Donations are accepted, but are not to exceed THB 10,000, as Chalermchai refuses to be influenced by big donors.

Entrance fee is THB 100 (200 THB in 2026) for foreigners and free for Thai citizens.

== Photos ==
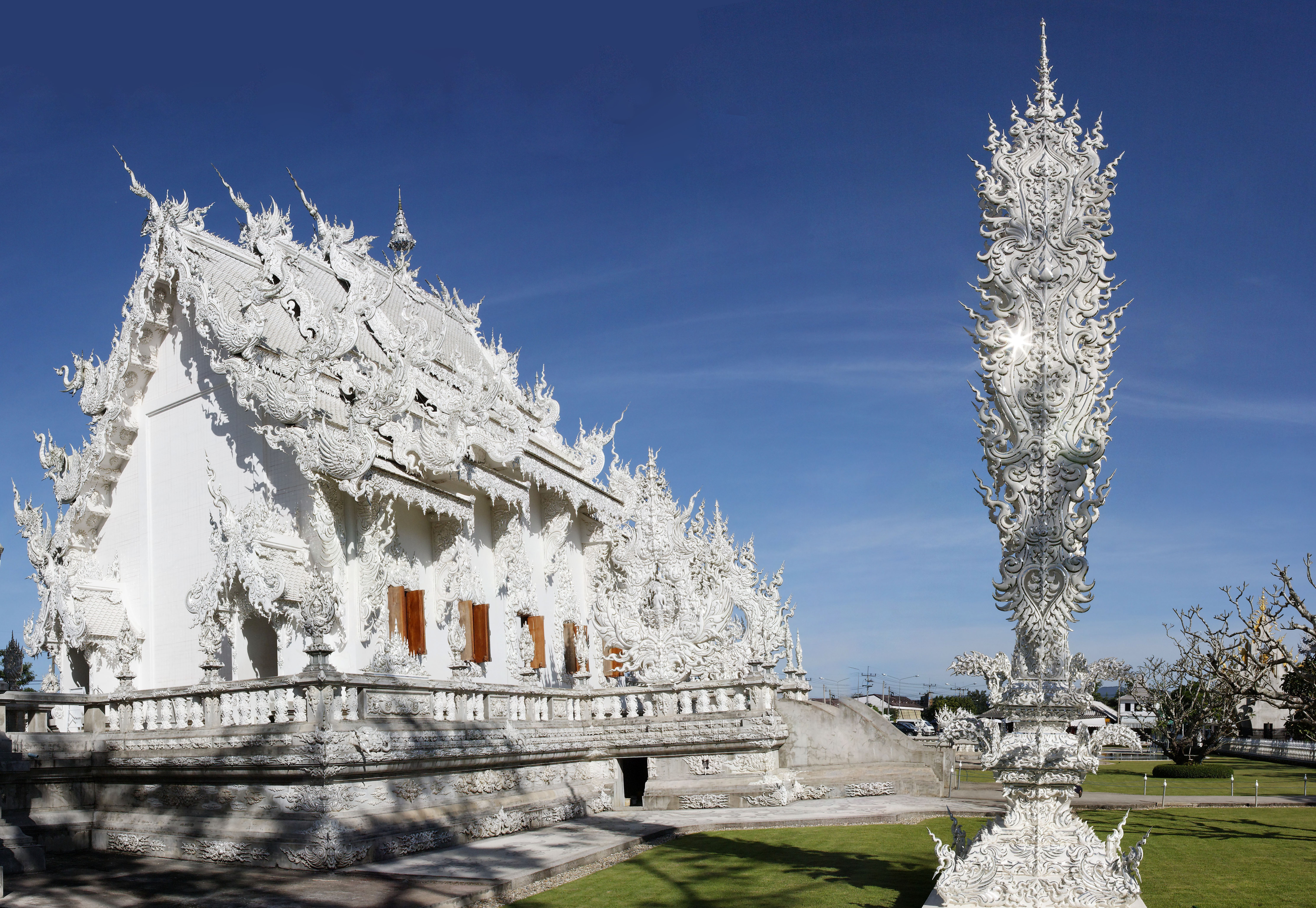

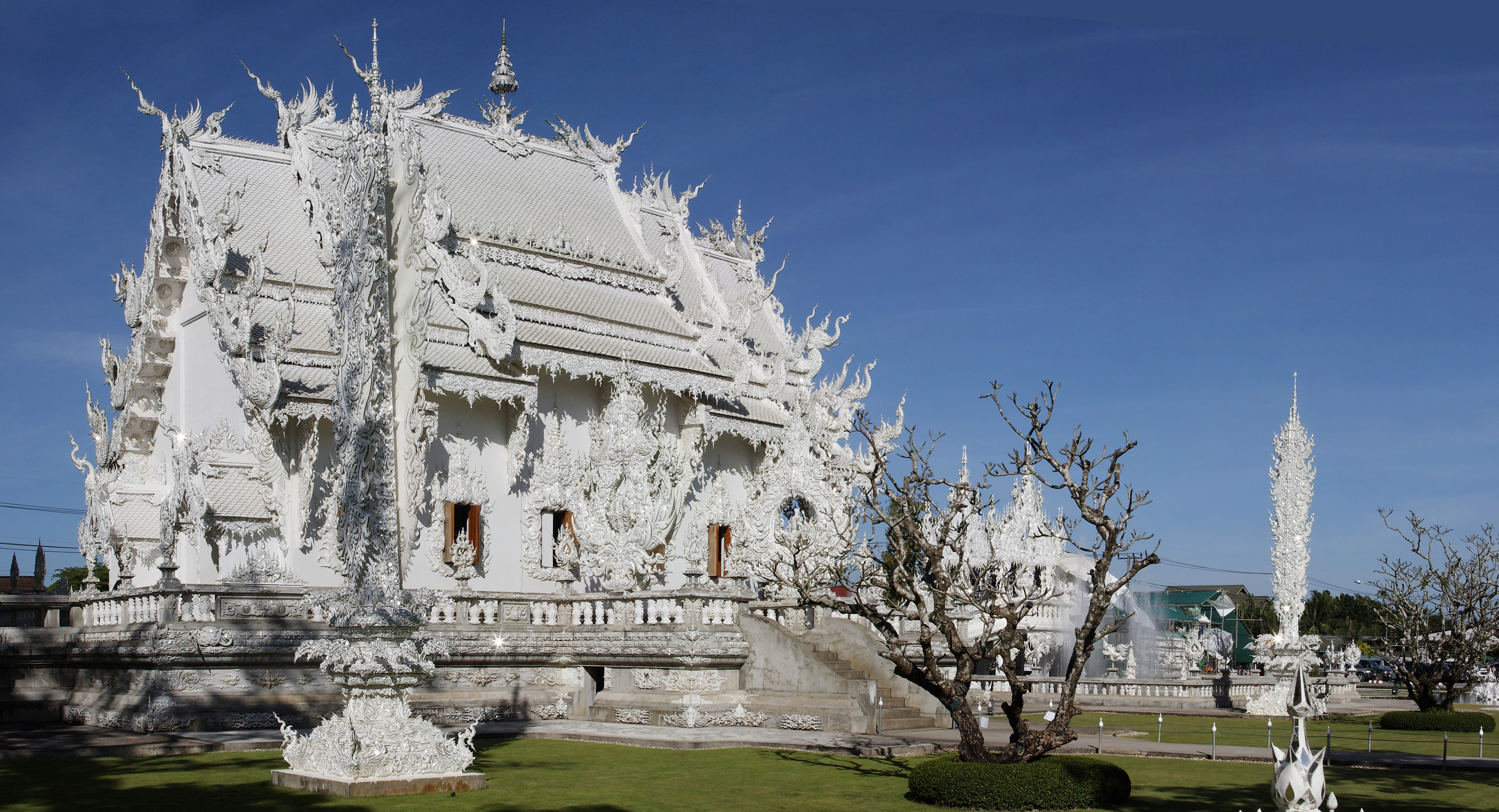

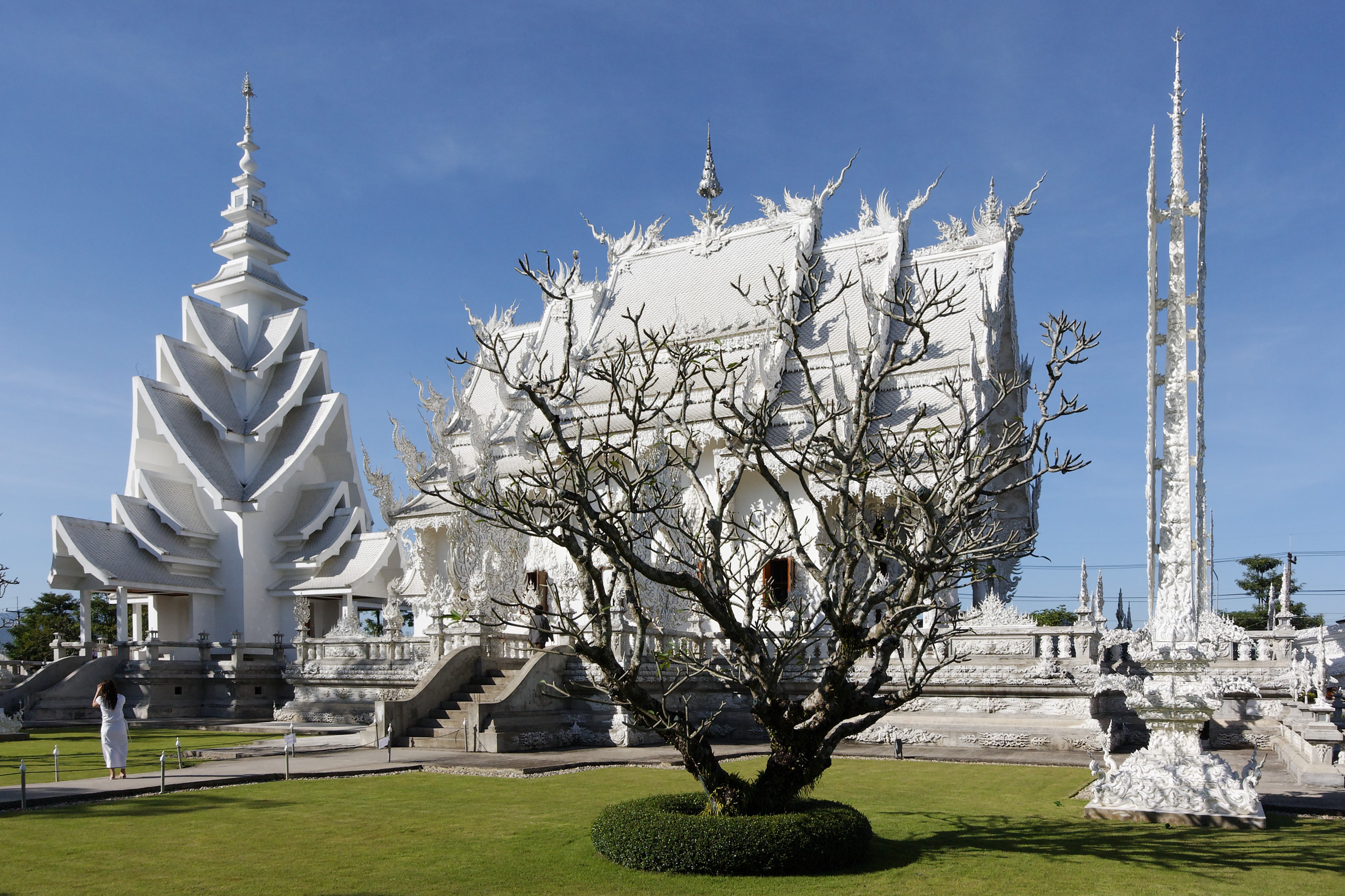

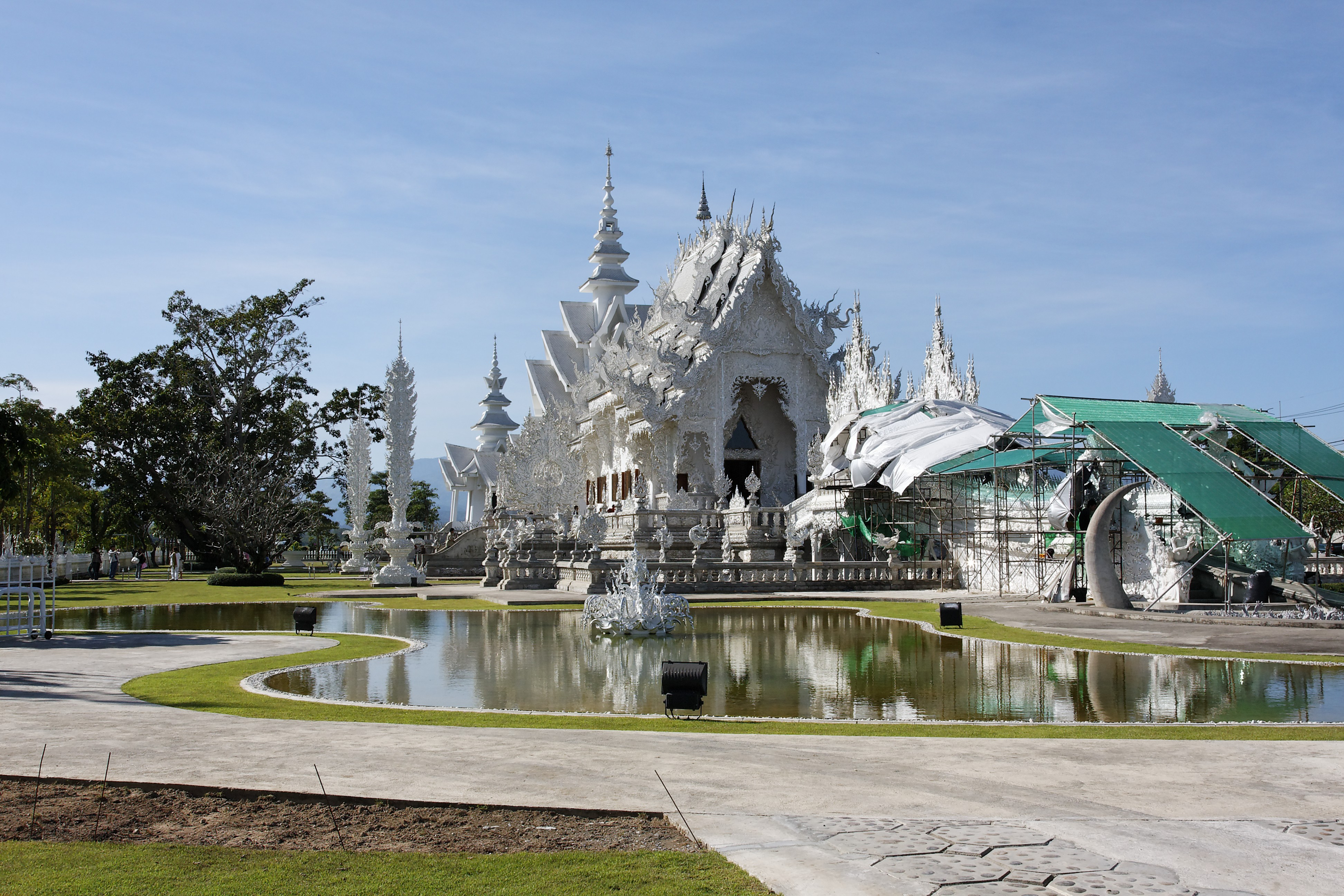

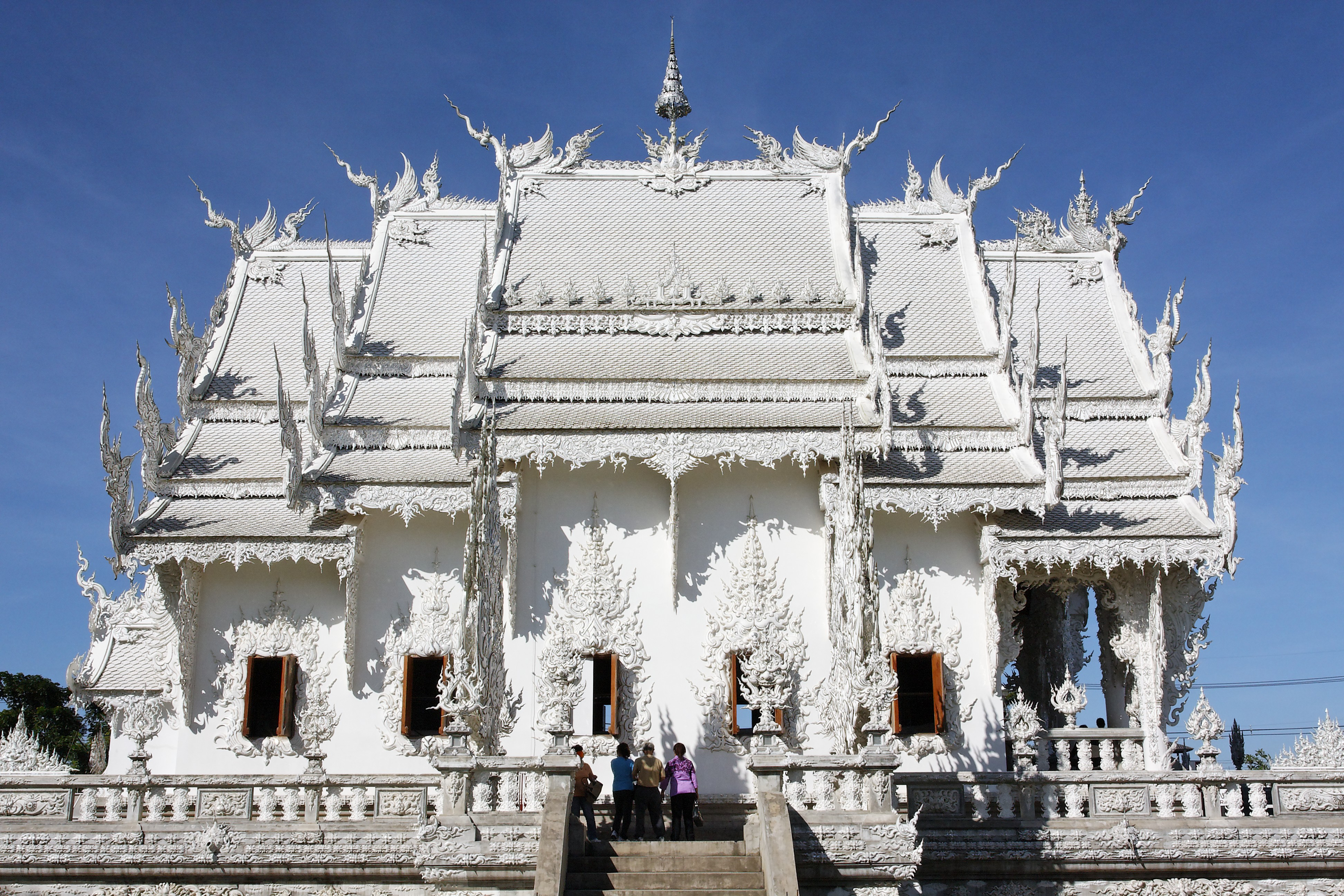

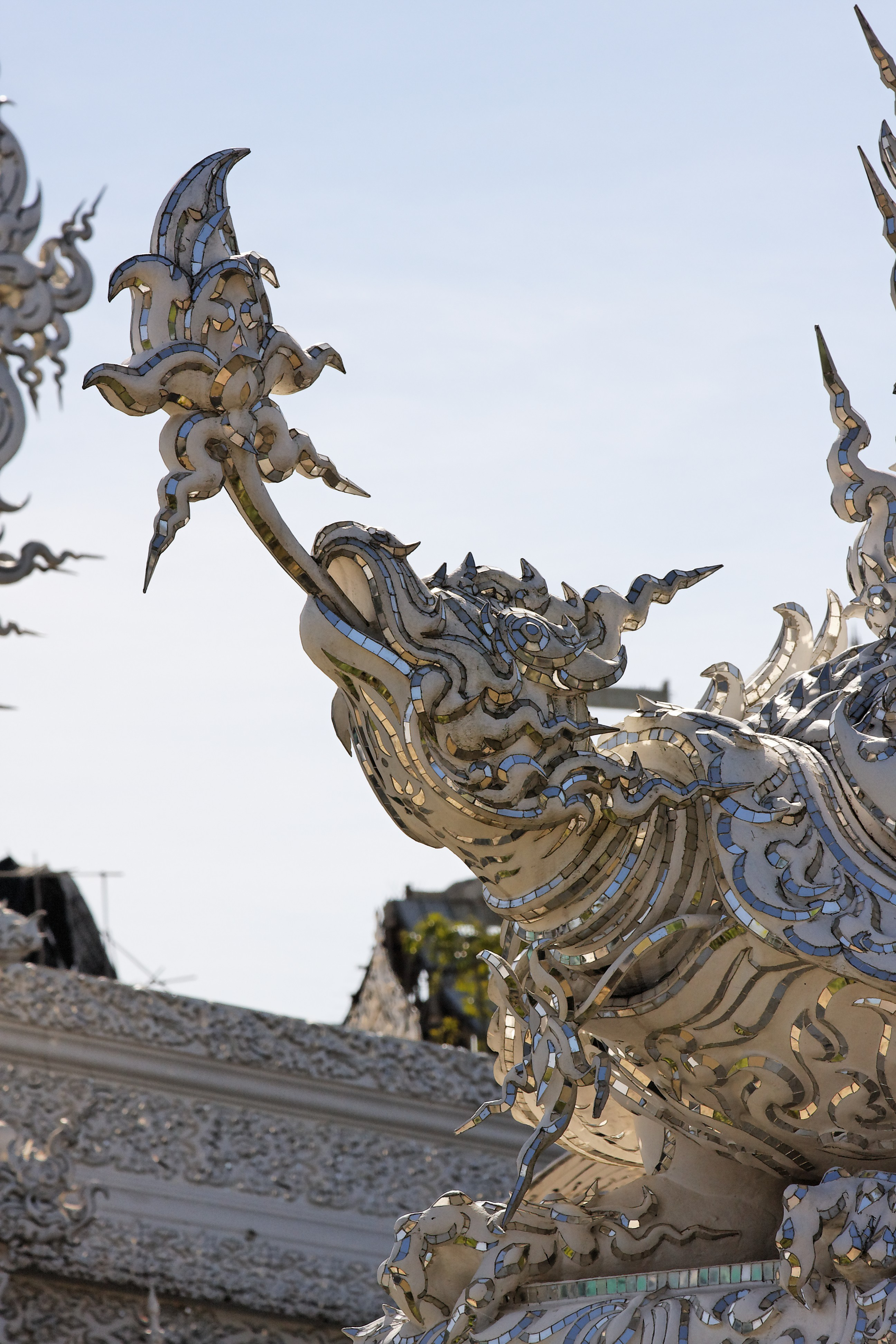

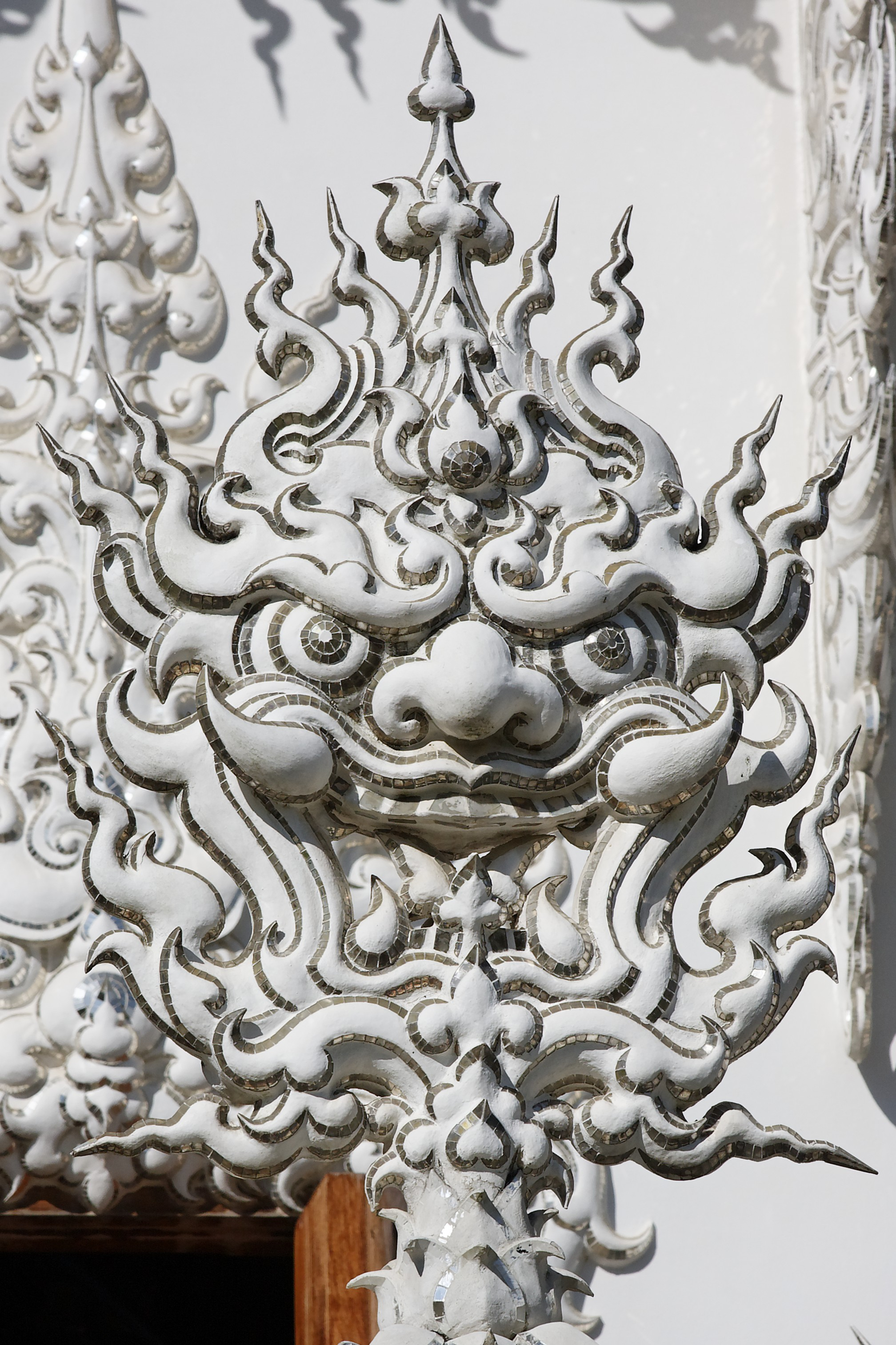

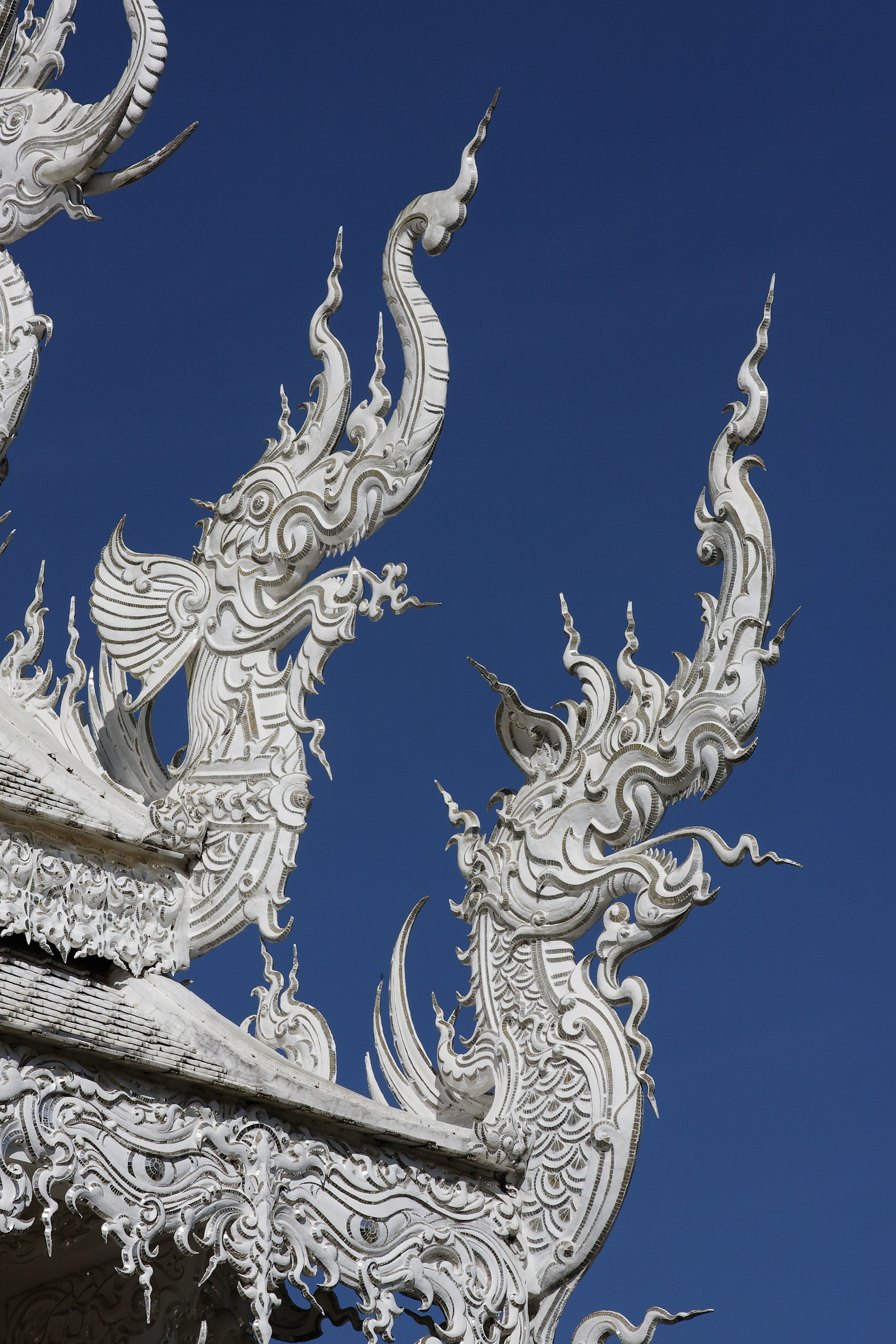

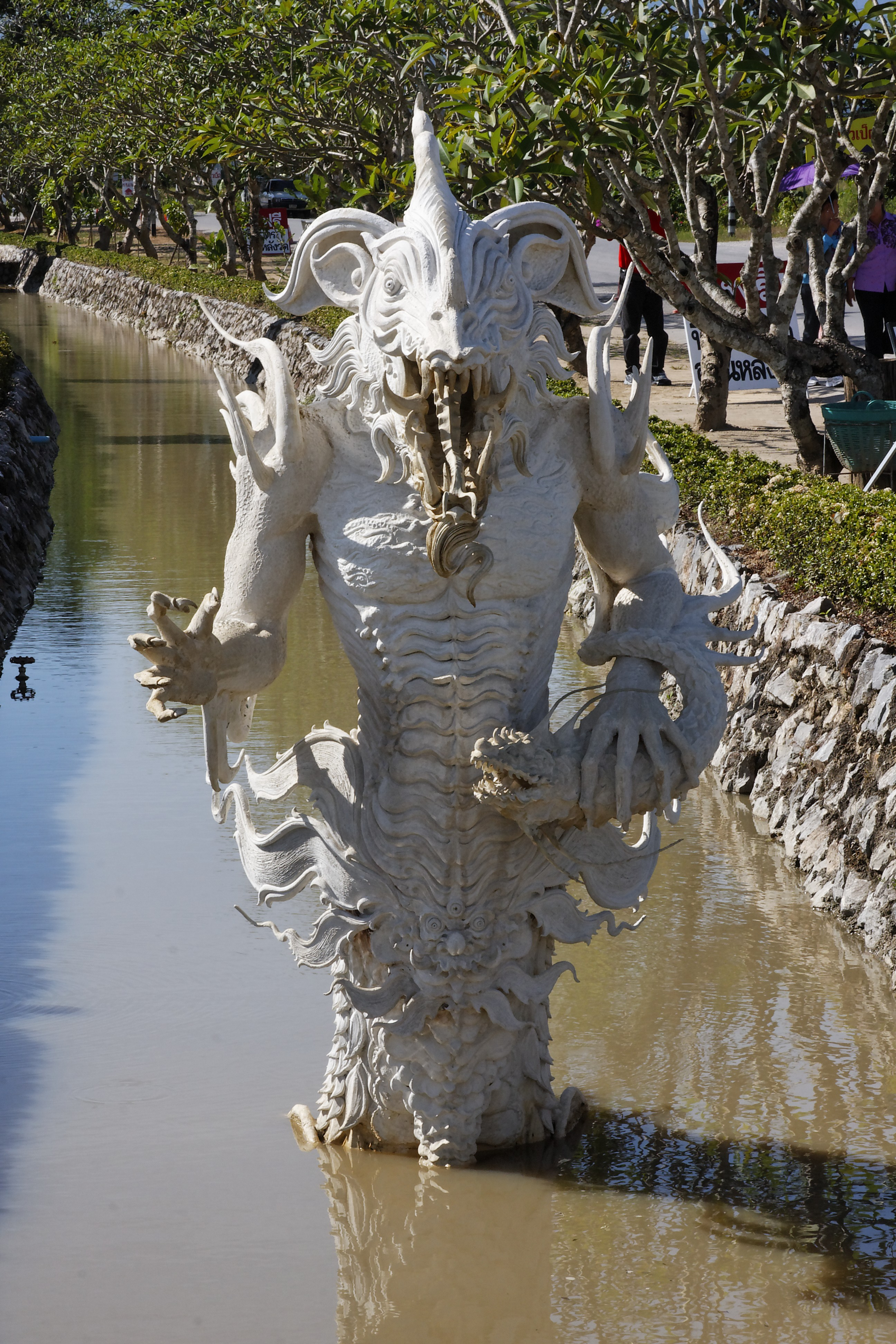

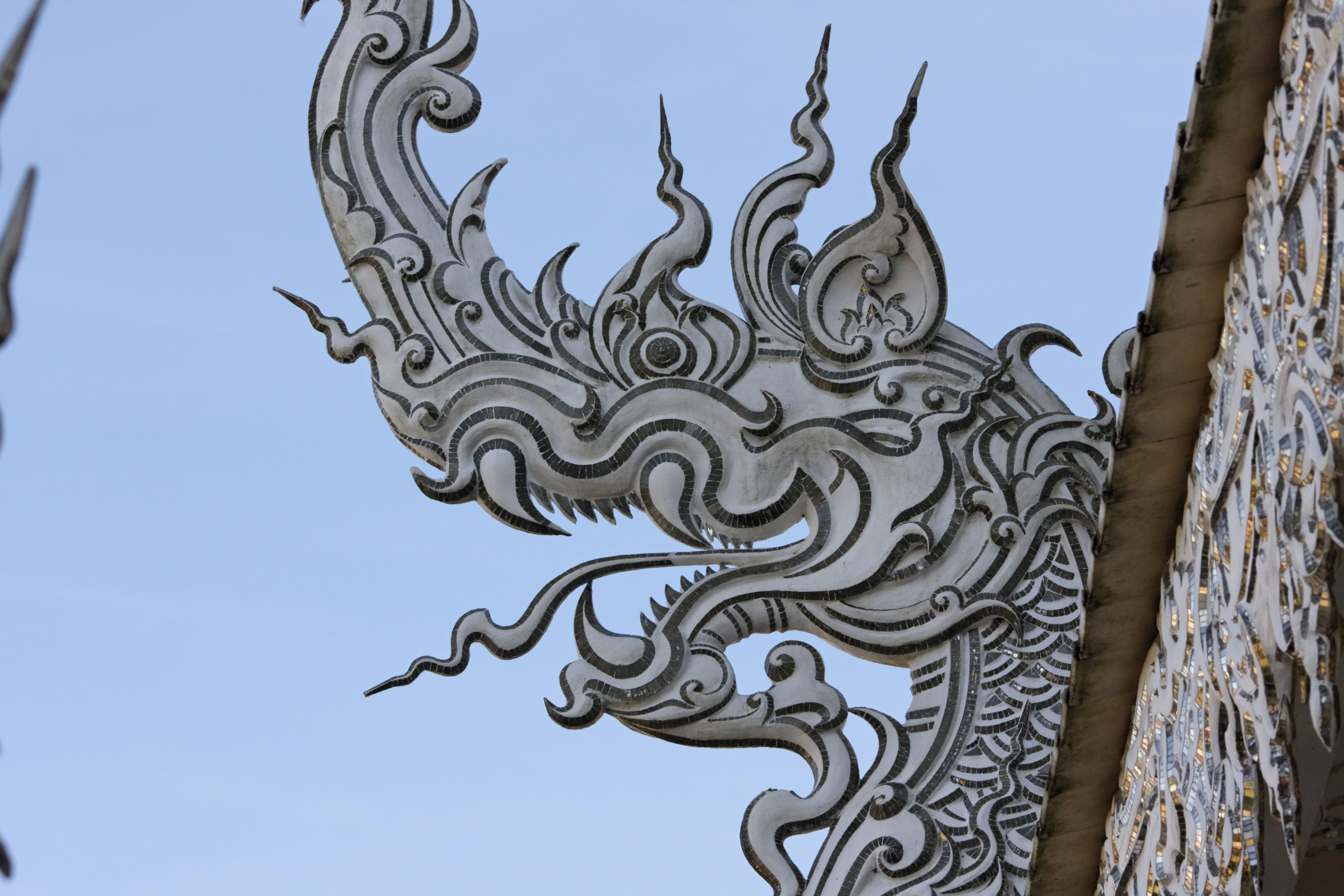

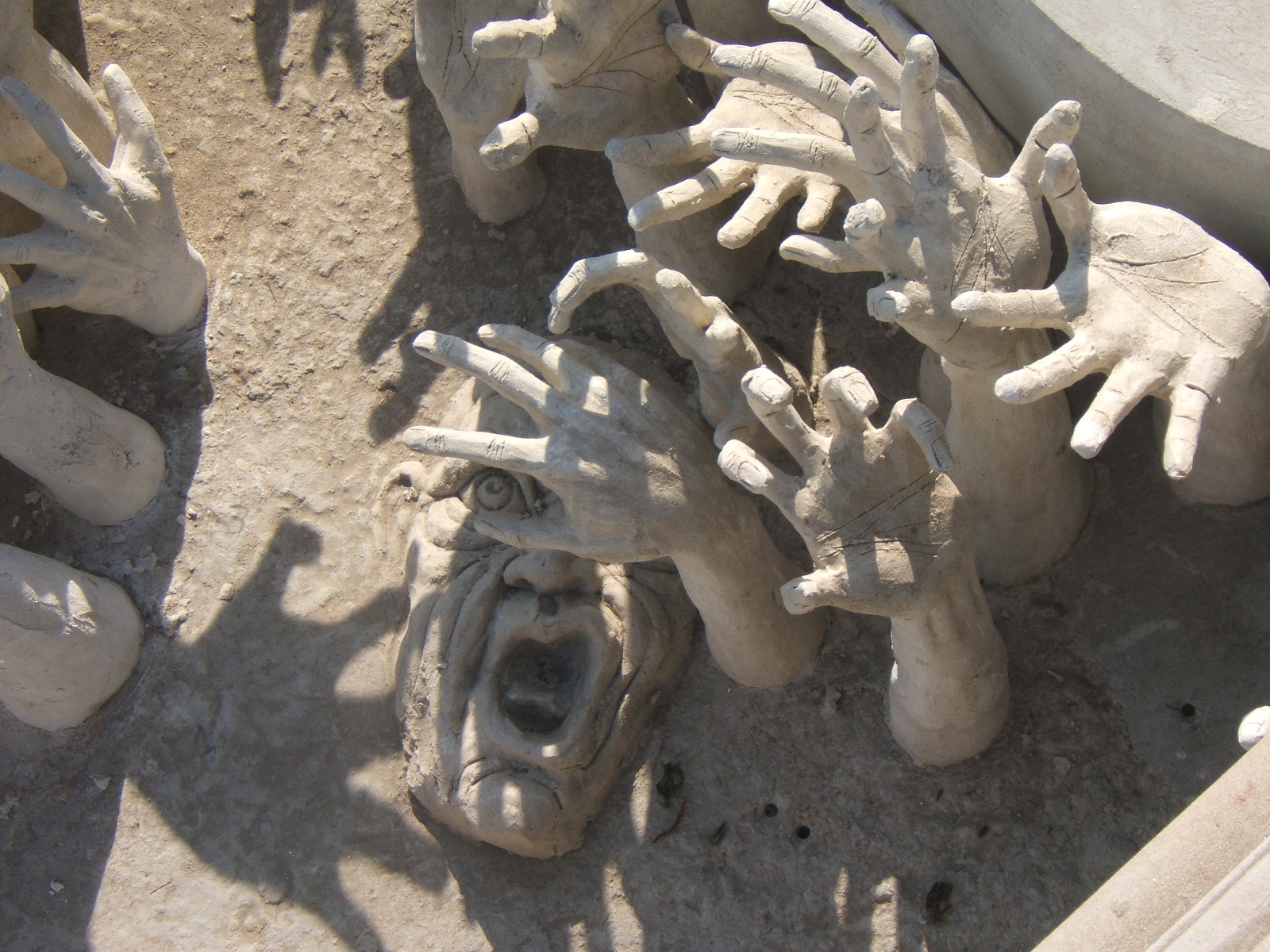

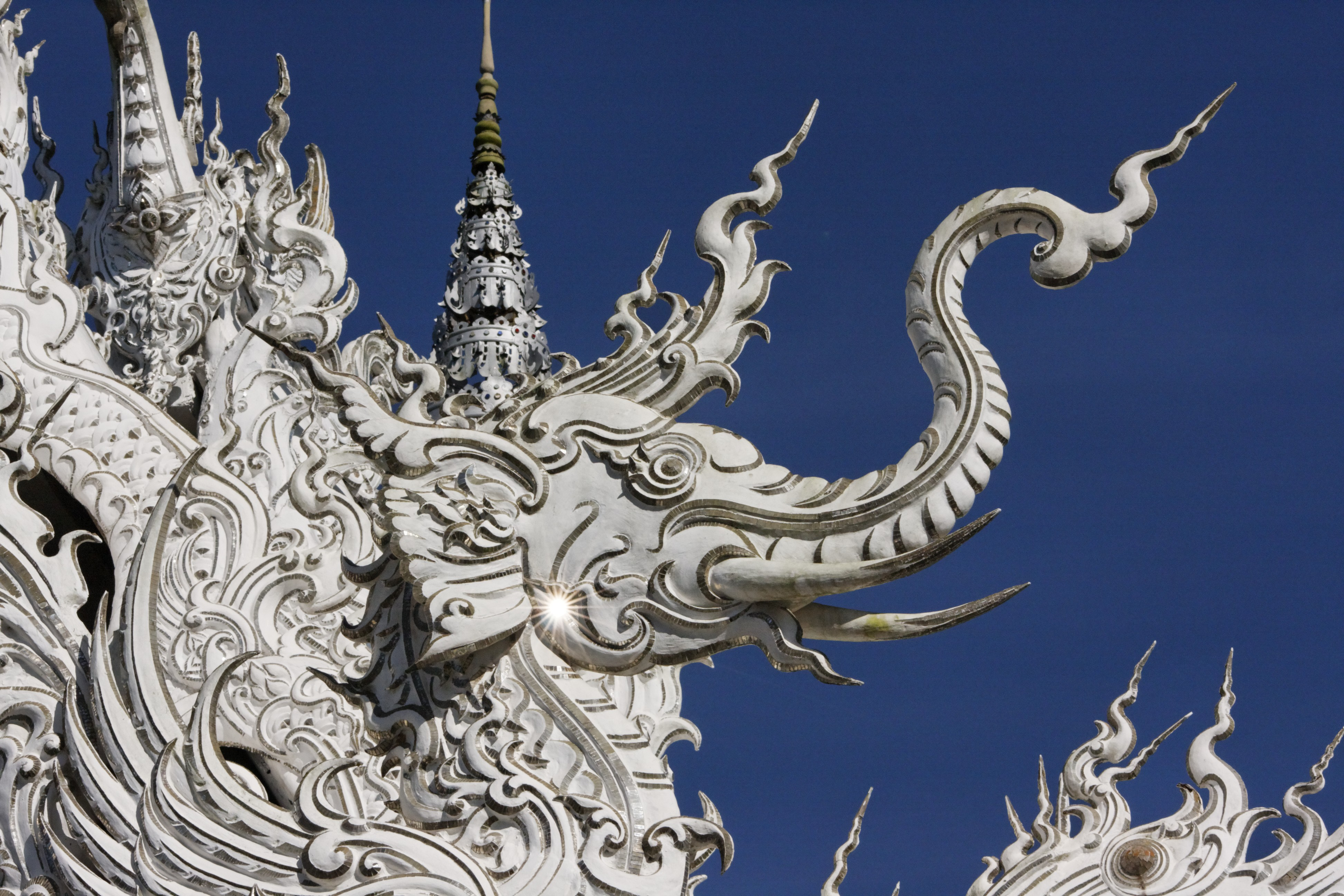

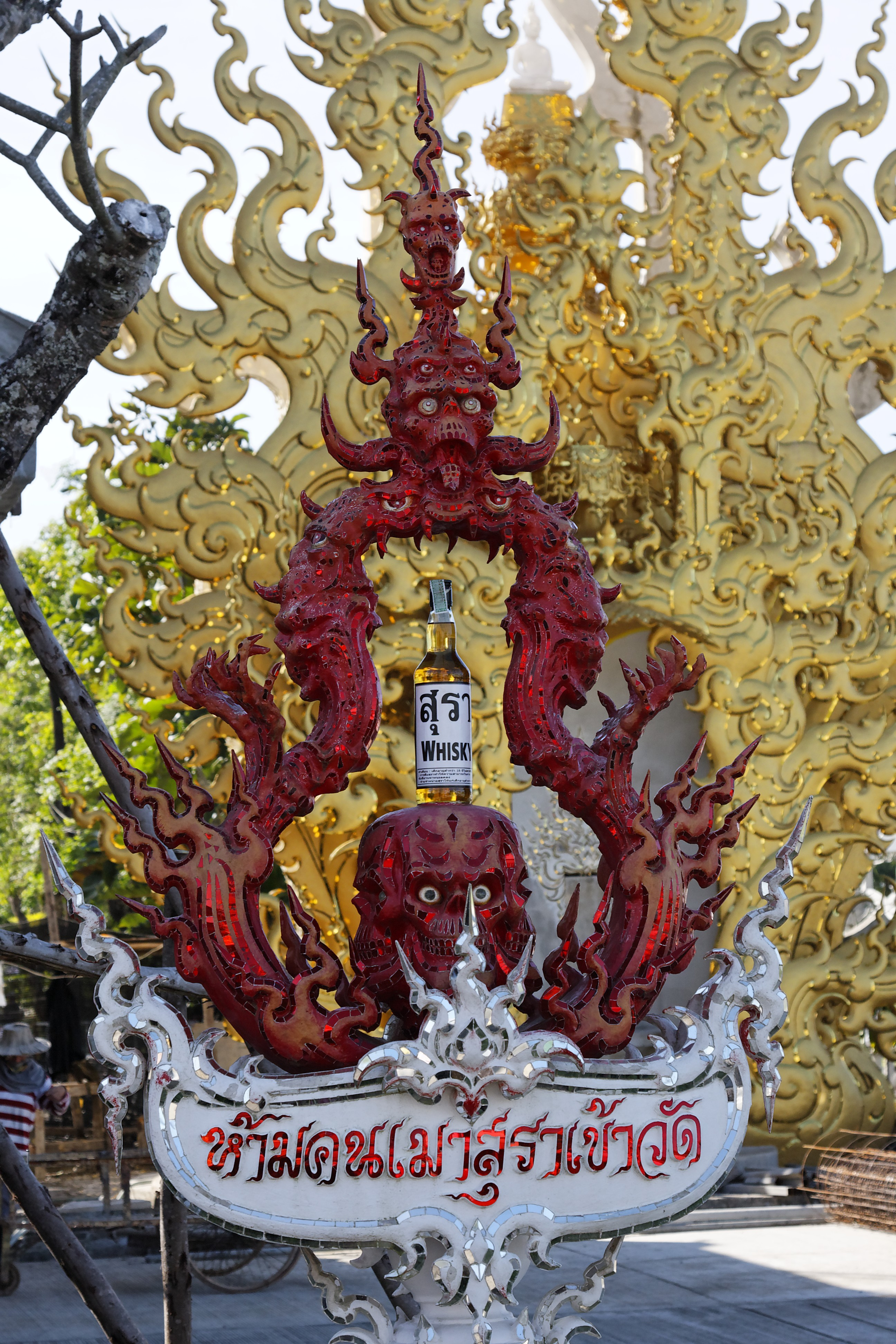

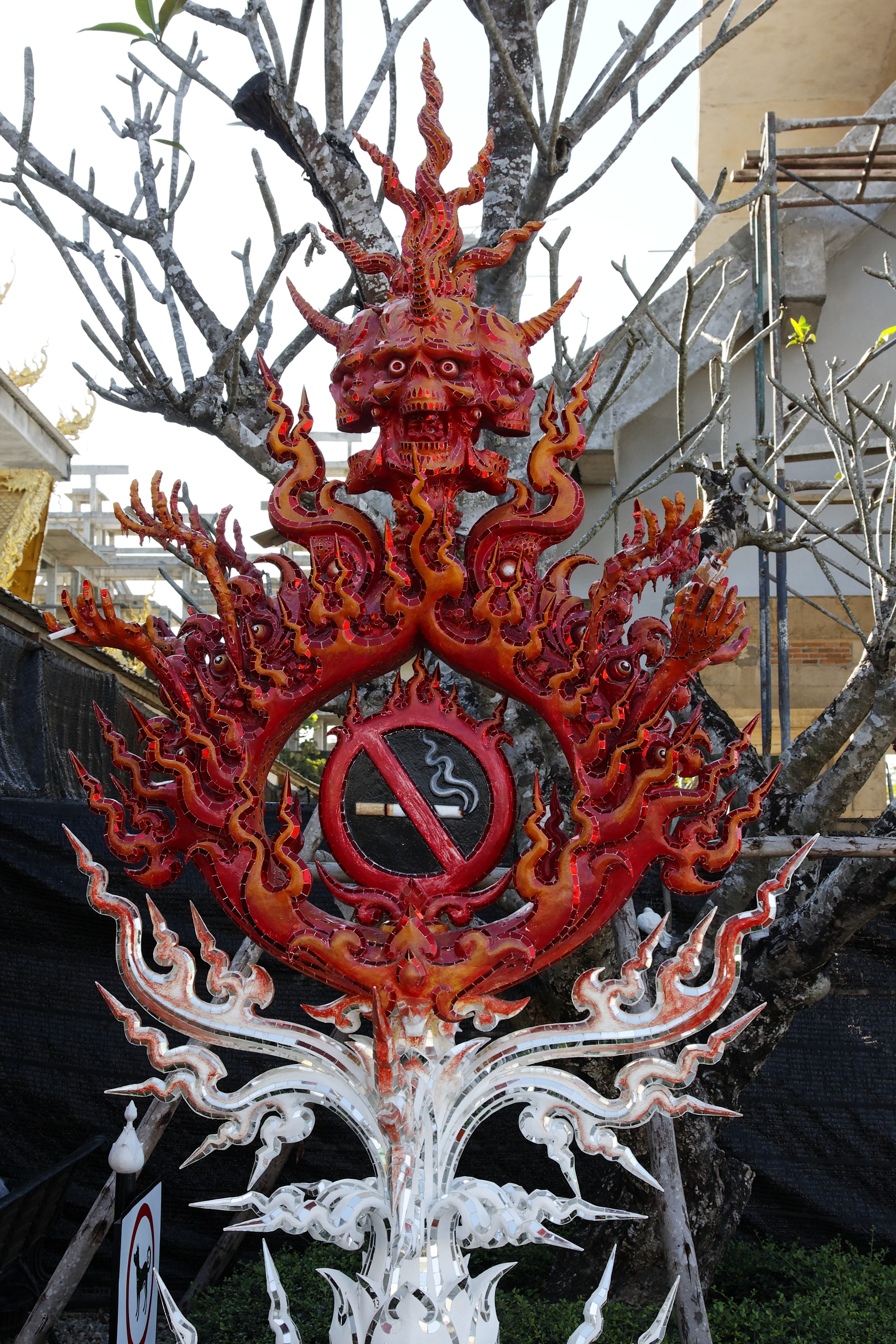

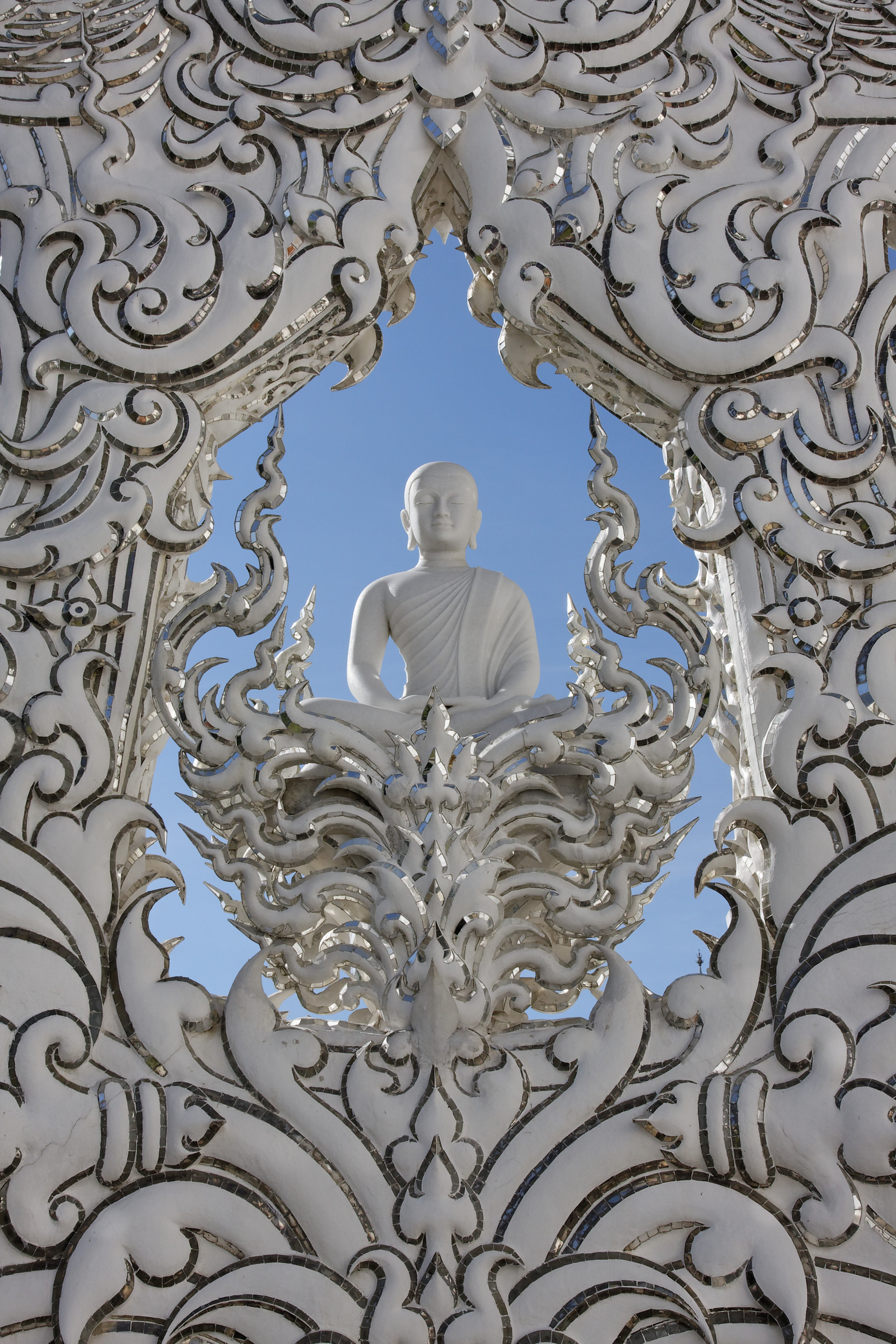

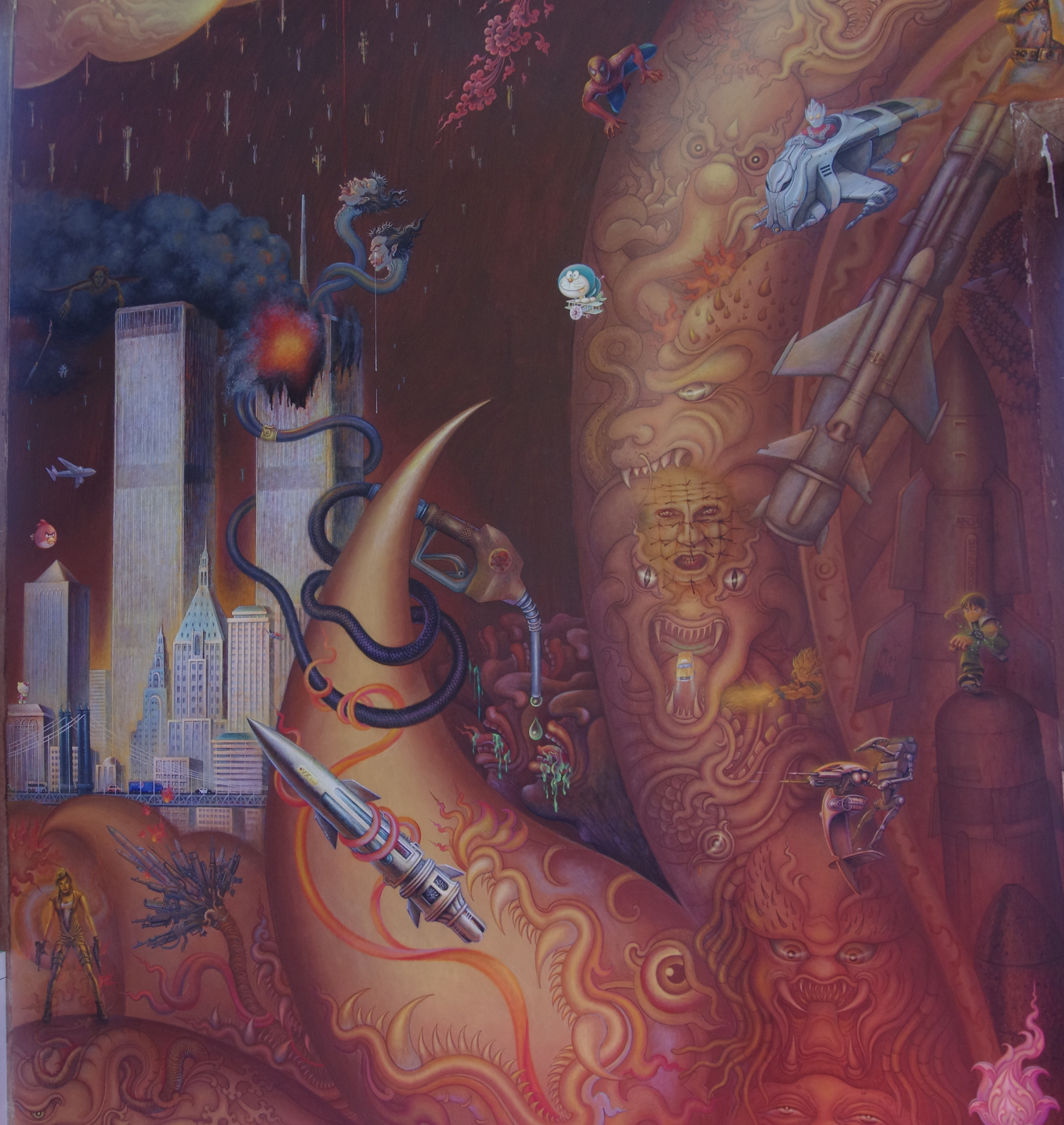

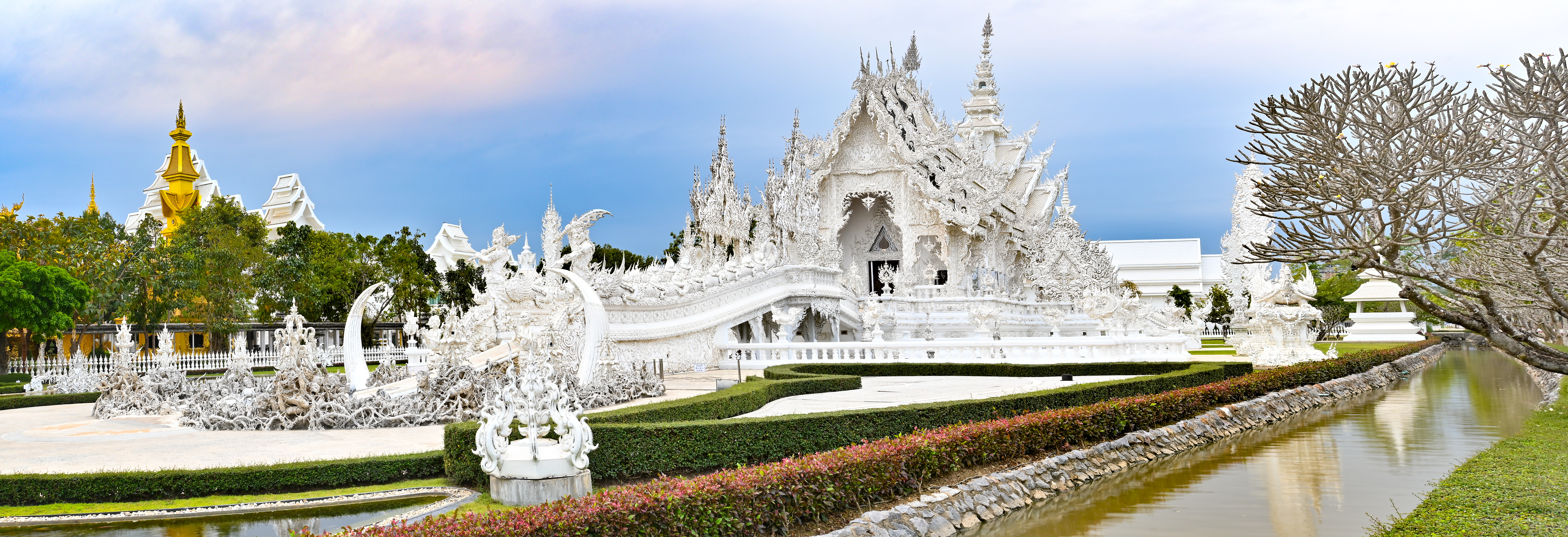

== See also ==
- Luang Pu Bunleua Sulilat / Sala Keoku / Buddha Park
- Lek Viriyaphant / Sanctuary of Truth / Ancient Siam / Erawan Museum
- Wat Pa Maha Chedi Kaew
- Visionary environments
- Hsinbyume Pagoda – White pagoda in Myanmar
- Le Palais idéal
