= Lao Buddhist sculpture =

Monk repainting a Nāga (mythical multi-headed snake) at Pha That Luang

Lao Buddhist sculptures were created by the Lao people of Southeast Asia. They are typically made of bronze, although gold and silver images can also be found. The Vat Manorom is believed to be the oldest colossal Lao Buddhist sculpture. Today, the sculpture gardens of Luang Pu Bunleua Sulilat provide a modern twist to the ancient tradition.

== Media for the sculptures ==
Lao artisans have, throughout the past, used a variety of media in their sculptural creations. Of the metals, bronze is probably the most common, but gold and silver images also exist. Typically, the precious metals are used only for smaller objects, but some large images have been cast in gold, most notably the Phra Sai of the sixteenth century, which the Siamese carried home as loot in the late eighteenth century. It is enshrined at Wat Po Chai in Nongkhai, Thailand, just across the Mekong River from Vientiane. The Phra Sai's two companion images, the Phra Serm and Phra Souk, are also in Thailand. One is in Bangkok and the other is in Lopburi. Perhaps the most famous sculpture in Laos, the Phra Bang, is also cast in gold, but the craftsmanship is held to be of Sinhalese, rather than Lao, origin. Tradition maintains that relics of the Buddha are contained in the image.

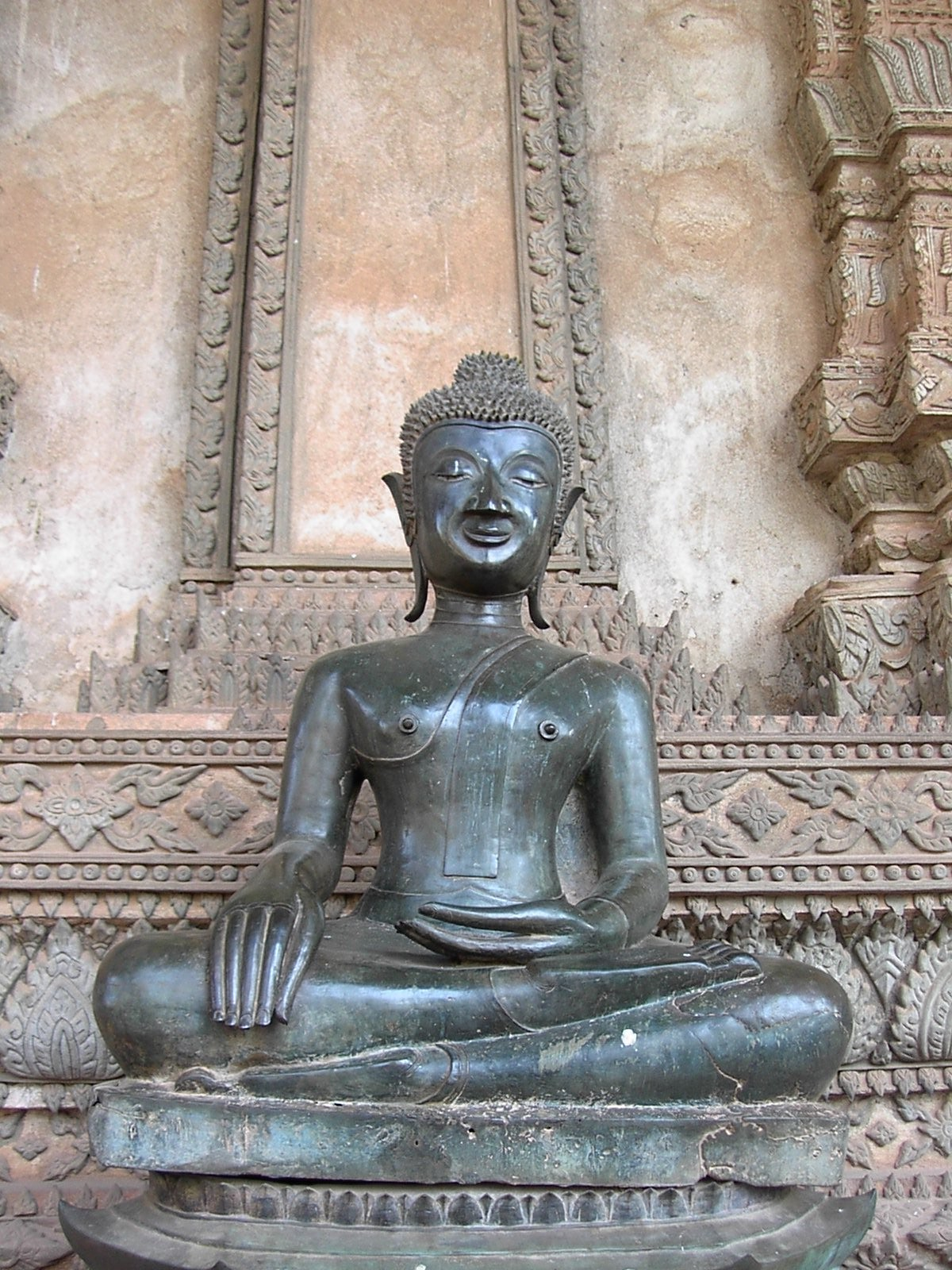
Statue of "the Buddha calling the earth to witness," the most common representation of the Buddha. The Buddha's hands are in the bhūmisparsa mudrā (subduing Māra) position. (Haw Phra Kaew temple, Vientiane, Laos)

Bronze is an alloy of copper, containing about two percent tin. Other materials are often added, however, and the balance of ingredients determines the characteristics of the bronze. In Laos, like Cambodia and Thailand, the bronze, which is called samrit, includes precious metals, and often has a relatively high percentage of tin, which gives the newly-cast images a lustrous dark gray color. Other images, such as the Buddha of Vat Chantabouri in Vientiane, have a higher copper and, probably, gold content that give them a muted gold color.

=== Notable sculptures ===
A number of colossal images in bronze exist. Most notable of these are the Phra Ong Teu (16th century) of Vientiane, the Phra Ong Teu of Sam Neua, the image at Vat Chantabouri (16th century) in Vientiane and the image at Vat Manorom (14th century) in Luang Phrabang, which seems to be the oldest of the colossal sculptures. The Manorom Buddha, of which only the head and torso remain, shows that colossal bronzes were cast in parts and assembled in place.

Brick-and-mortar also seems to be a favorite medium for colossal images. Perhaps the most famous of these is the image of Phya Vat (16th century) in Vientiane, though apparently an unfortunate renovation completely altered the appearance of the sculpture, and it no longer resembles a Lao Buddha.

Wood is popular for small, votive Buddhist images that are often left in caves. Wood is also very common for large, life-size standing images of the Buddha.

The most famous two sculptures carved in semi-precious stone are the Phra Keo (The Emerald Buddha) and the Phra Phuttha Butsavarat. The Phra Keo, which is probably of Xieng Sen (Chiang Saen) origin, is carved from a solid block of jade. It rested in Vientiane for two hundred years before the Siamese carried it away as booty in the late eighteenth century. It now serves as the palladium of the Kingdom of Thailand, and resides at the Grand Palace in Bangkok. The Phra Phuttha Butsavarat was also taken to Bangkok, today it resides at the Amphorn Sathan Residential Hall. Before the Siamese seized it in the early nineteenth century, this crystal image was the palladium of the Lao kingdom of Champassack.

Many mostly wooden Lao Buddhist sculptures have been assembled inside the Pak Ou caves.

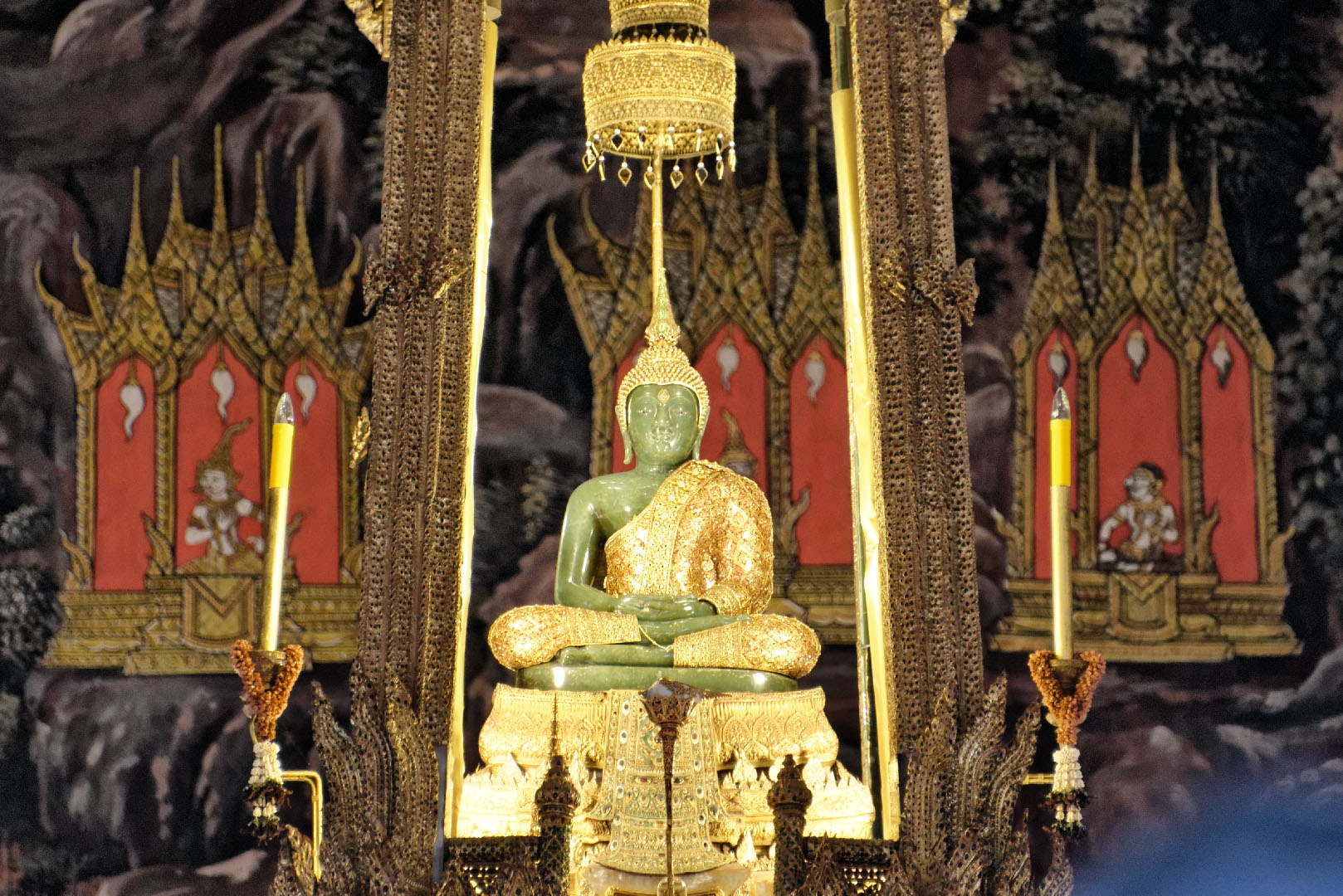
Phra Keo, the Emerald Buddha, resides in Bangkok, Thailand

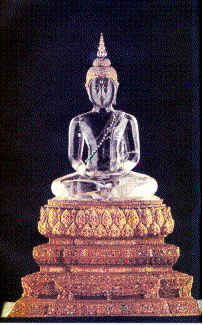
Phra Phuttha Butsavarat the crystal Buddha of Champassak, resides in Bangkok, Thailand

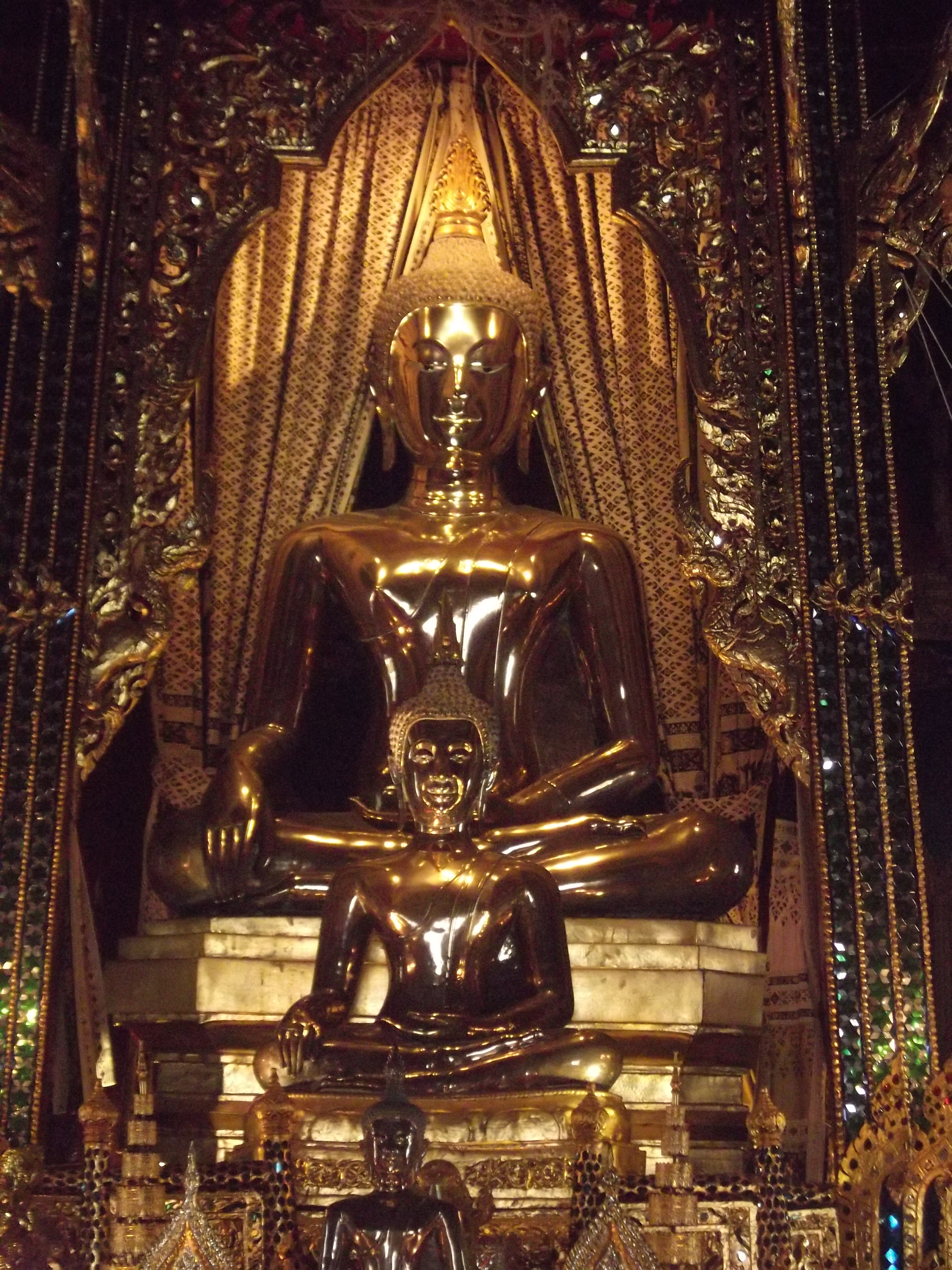
Phra Serm one of three Buddha images cast by King Setthatirath of Lan Xang, resides in Bangkok, Thailand

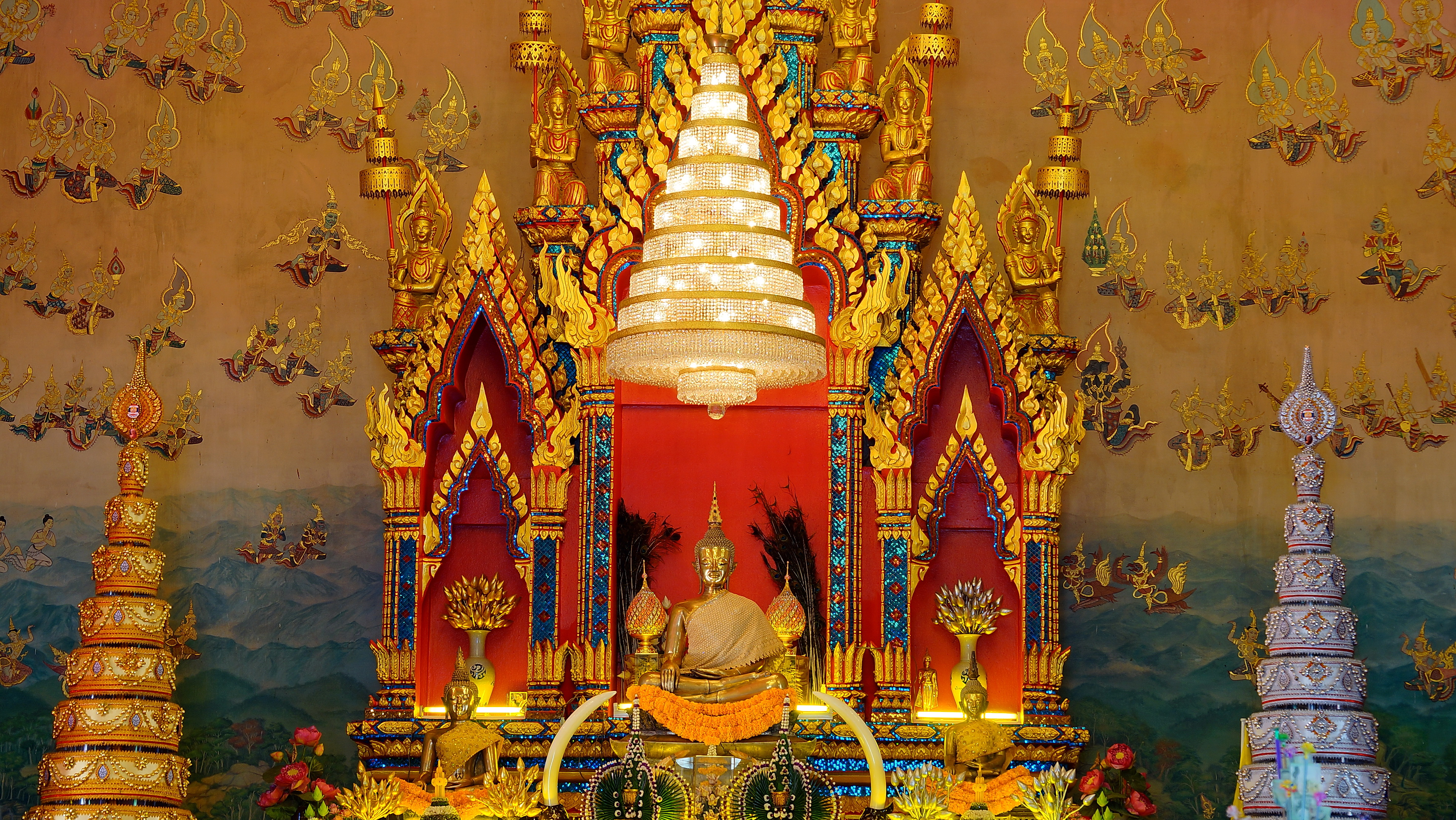
Phra Sai, one of three Buddha images cast by Setthatirath of Lan Xang, resides in Nong Khai, Thailand

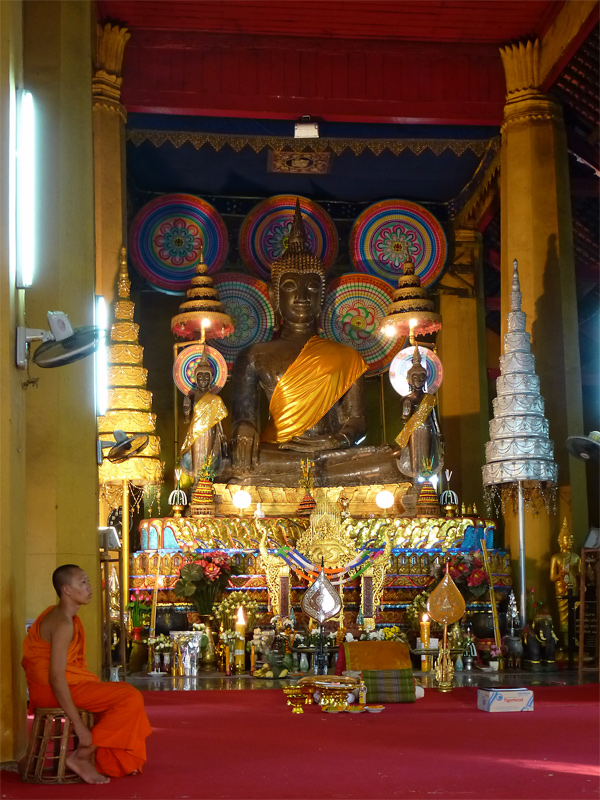
Phra Ong Teu colossal Buddha image in Vientiane, Laos

== Modern developments ==
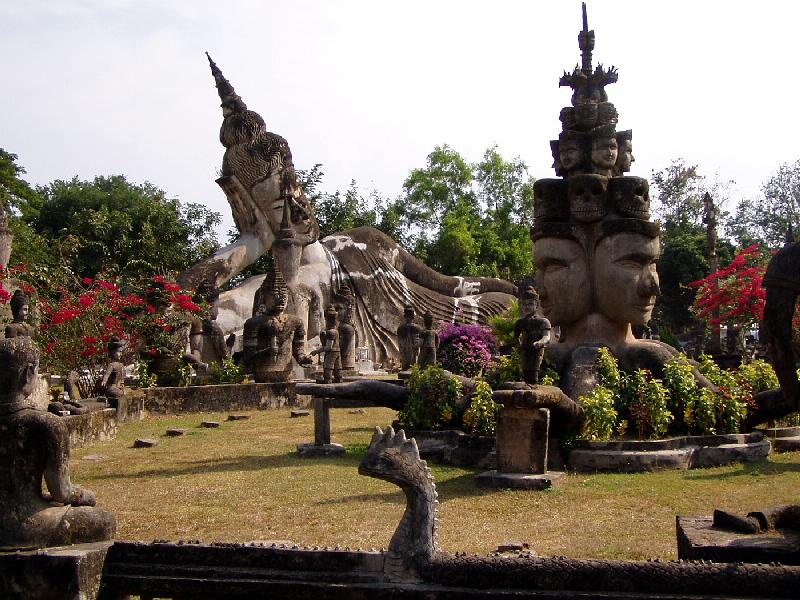
Buddha Park

The religious art tradition of the region has received an original contemporary twist in the monumental fantastic sculpture gardens of Luang Pu Bunleua Sulilat: Buddha Park near Vientiane, and Sala Keoku near Nong Khai, Thailand.

== See also ==
- Iconography of Gautama Buddha in Laos and Thailand
- Korean Buddhist sculpture
- Thai Buddhist sculpture
  - Leela Attitude
  - Māravijaya Attitude
  - Meditation Attitude
  - Naga Prok Attitude
