= Sala Keoku =

Sculpture park in Thailand

Coordinates: 17°53′12.84″N 102°46′56.16″E

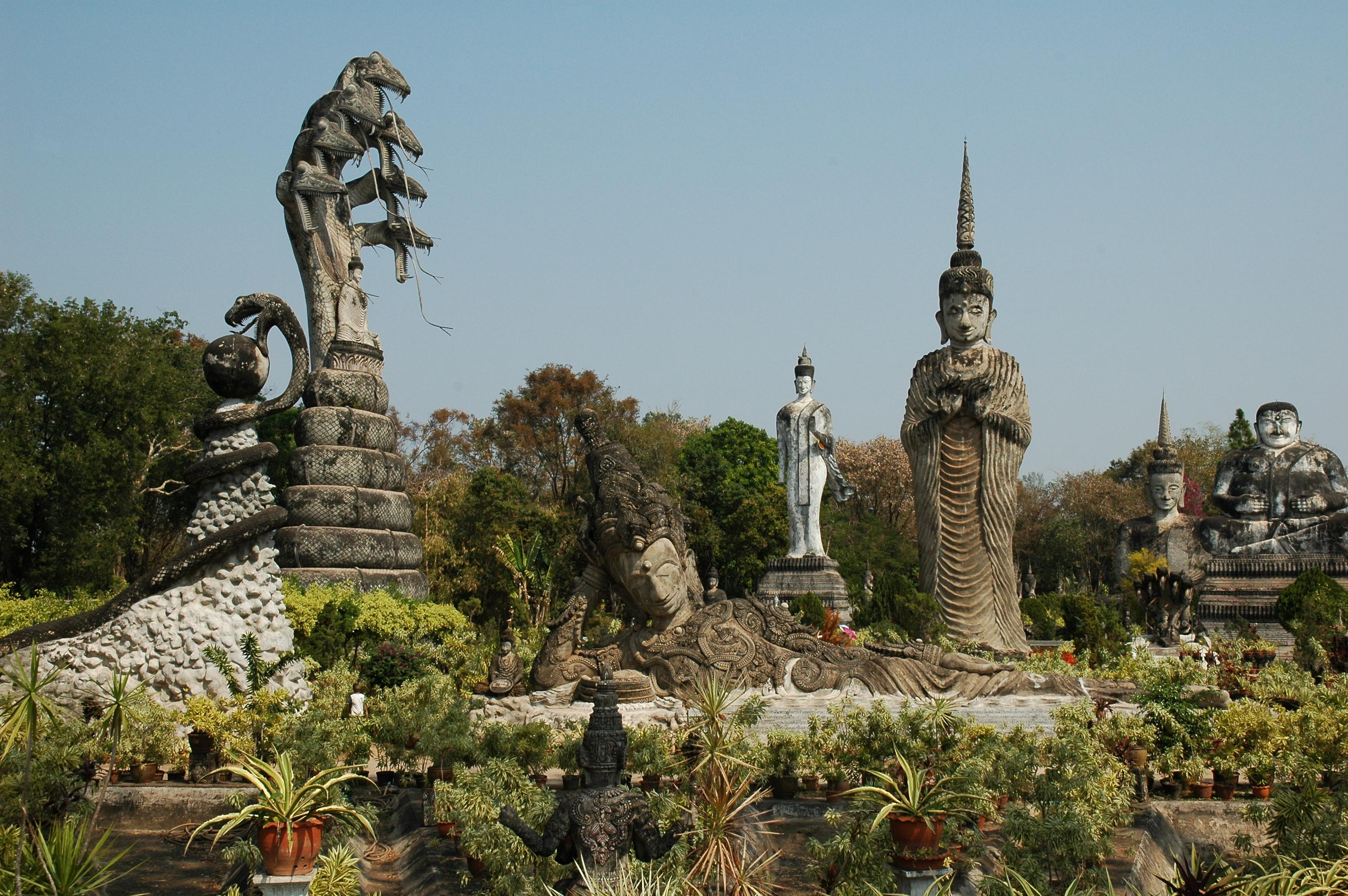
Sala Keoku sculpture park

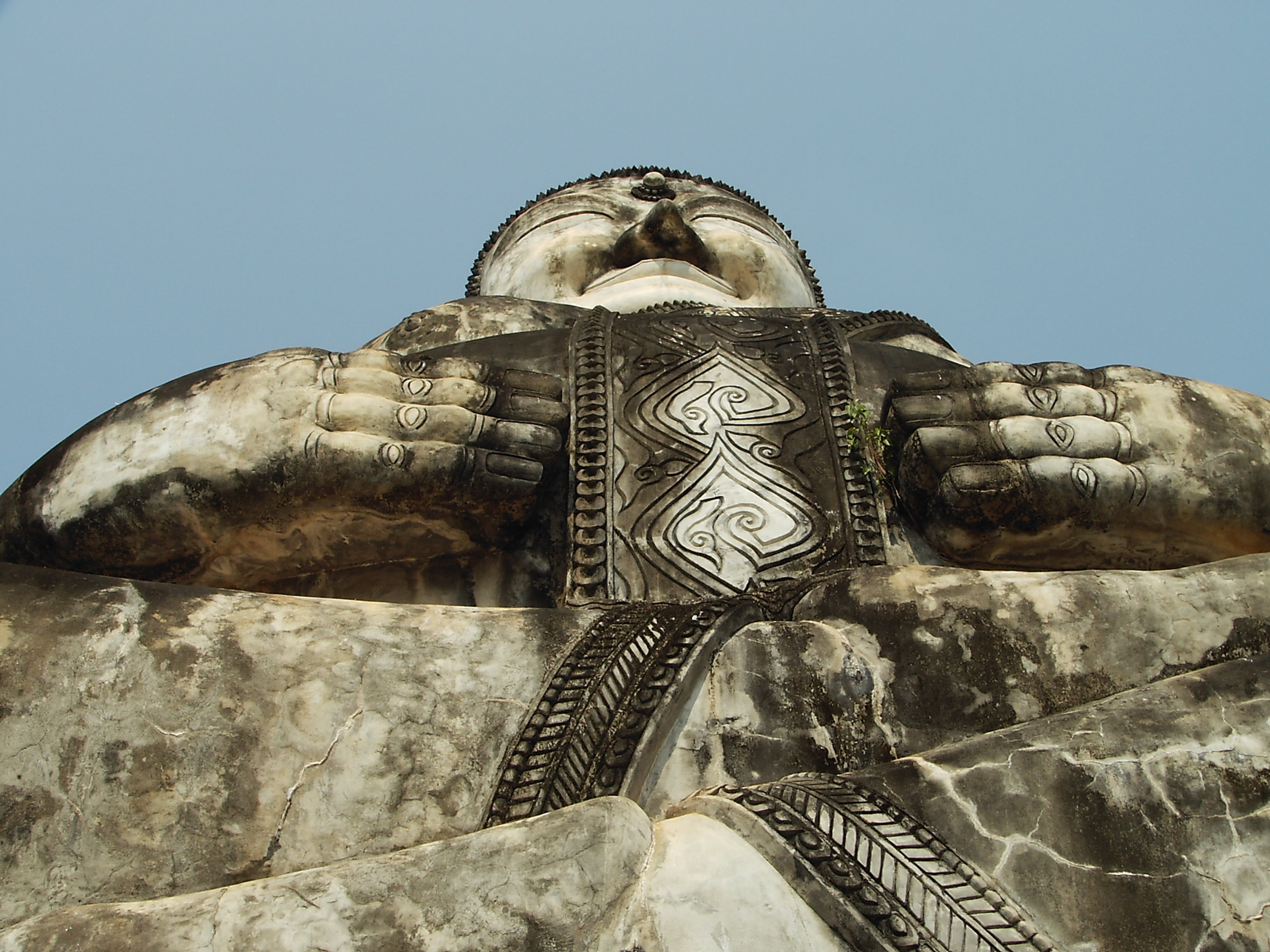
Part of a sculpture in the park

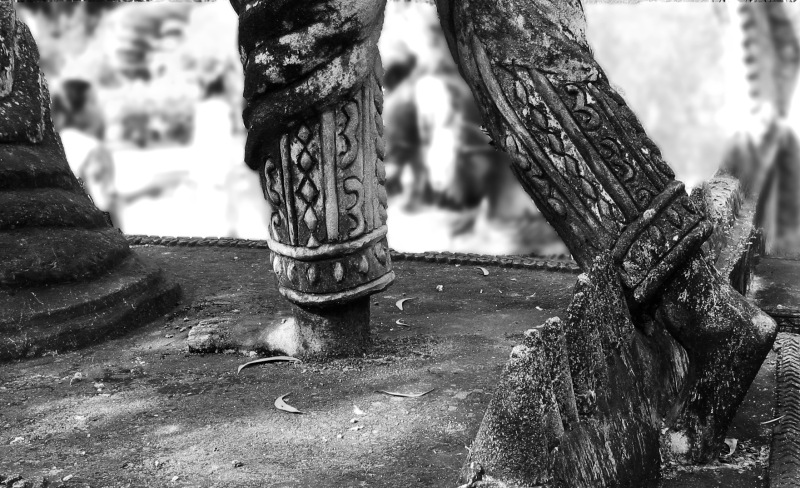
Part of a sculpture in the park

Sala Keoku (Thai: ศาลาแก้วกู่; RTGS: Sala Kaeo Ku; [sǎːlaː kɛ̂ːw kùː], also spelled as Sala Keo Ku, Sala Keo Koo, Sala Kaew Ku, Sala Kaew Koo, Salakaewkoo, Sala Gaew Goo, Sala Kaeoku, etc.; alternative name: Wat Khaek) is a park featuring giant fantastic concrete sculptures inspired by Buddhism and Hinduism. It is located near Nong Khai, Thailand in immediate proximity of the Thai-Lao border and the Mekong river. The park has been built by and reflects the vision of Luang Pu Bunleua Sulilat and his followers. The construction started in 1978. It shares the style of Sulilat's earlier creation, Buddha Park on the Lao side of Mekong, but is marked by even more extravagant fantasy and greater proportions.

Some of the Sala Keoku sculptures reach 25m. Those include a monumental depiction of Buddha meditating under the protection of a seven-headed Naga snake. While the subject (based on a Buddhist legend) is one of the recurrent themes in the religious art of the region, Sulilat's approach is unusual, with its naturalistic (even though stylized) representation of the snakes.

The Sala Keoku pavilion is a three-story concrete building, whose domes bear a resemblance to a mosque. It was constructed following Sulilat's plans after his death. The third floor houses related artifacts, as well as Sulilat's mummified body.

Perhaps the most enigmatic part of the park is the Wheel of Life, a circular multi-part group of sculptures representing the karmic cycle of birth and death through a progression of tarot-like characters. The composition culminates with a young man taking a step across the fence surrounding the entire installation to become a Buddha statue on the other side.

== See also ==
- Visionary environments
- Outsider art
- Wat Rong Khun
- Sanctuary of Truth
- Wat Pa Maha Chedi Kaew
- Park of the Monsters
- Sala (architecture)
