= Bunleua Sulilat =

Thai/Lao sculptor (1932–1996)

- Born: June 7, 1932; Nong Khai, Thailand
- Died: August 10, 1996 (aged 64); Nong Khai, Thailand
- Other name: Luang Pu Bunleua Sulilat

Bunleua Sulilat (June 7, 1932 – August 10, 1996; often referred to as Luang Pu Bunleua Sulilat; Thai: หลวงปู่บุญเหลือ สุรีรัตน์, RTGS: Luangpu Bunluea Surirat, pronounced [lǔaŋ.pùː būn.lɯ̌a sù(ʔ).rīː.rát]; numerous variants of the spelling exist in Western languages: see below) was a Thai Isan/Lao mystic, myth-maker, spiritual leader and sculpture artist. He is responsible for creating two religious-themed parks featuring giant fantastic sculptures made of concrete on the banks of the Mekong river near Thai-Lao border: Buddha Park (Lao: ວັດຊຽງຄວນ, Thai: วัดเซียงควน) on the Lao side (25 km southeast from Vientiane), and Sala Keoku (Thai: ศาลาแก้วกู่) on the Thai side (3 km east of Nong Khai).

== Biography ==
Bunleua Sulilat was born in 1932 as the seventh of eight children to a family in Nong Khai province, Thailand. According to a legend, as a young man, he fell into a cave and thus met hermit Keoku, his spiritual mentor, after whom Sala Keoku (The Hall of Keoku) is named.

Upon graduating from his apprenticeship with Keoku, Sulilat took on monumental sculpting, and proceeded with the construction (in 1958) of his first concrete sculpture garden, Buddha Park near Vientiane, Laos. Concerned about the political climate in Laos after the 1975 communist revolution, Sulilat crossed Mekong fleeing to Thailand. In 1978, he commenced the construction of a new sculpture garden, Sala Keoku, located across the river from the old one.

Sulilat's eccentric and captivating personality and the blend of Buddhism and Hinduism he professed proved to hold great appeal to some of the locals, and Sala Keoku became something of a religious sect headquarters. The title Luang Pu (usually reserved for monks) came to be applied to Sulilat, who was technically a secular man. Both of the parks were constructed from donated concrete by hundreds of unskilled enthusiasts working without payment. Some other residents of the area considered Sulilat to be insane.

In his later years, Sulilat suffered a fall from one of his giant sculptures. Subsequently, his health deteriorated (the precise relation of his illness to the fall is unclear; he appears to have suffered from some blood disease), and he died in 1996. His mummified body has been enshrined at the 3rd floor of the Sala Keoku pavilion building.

== Style and vision ==
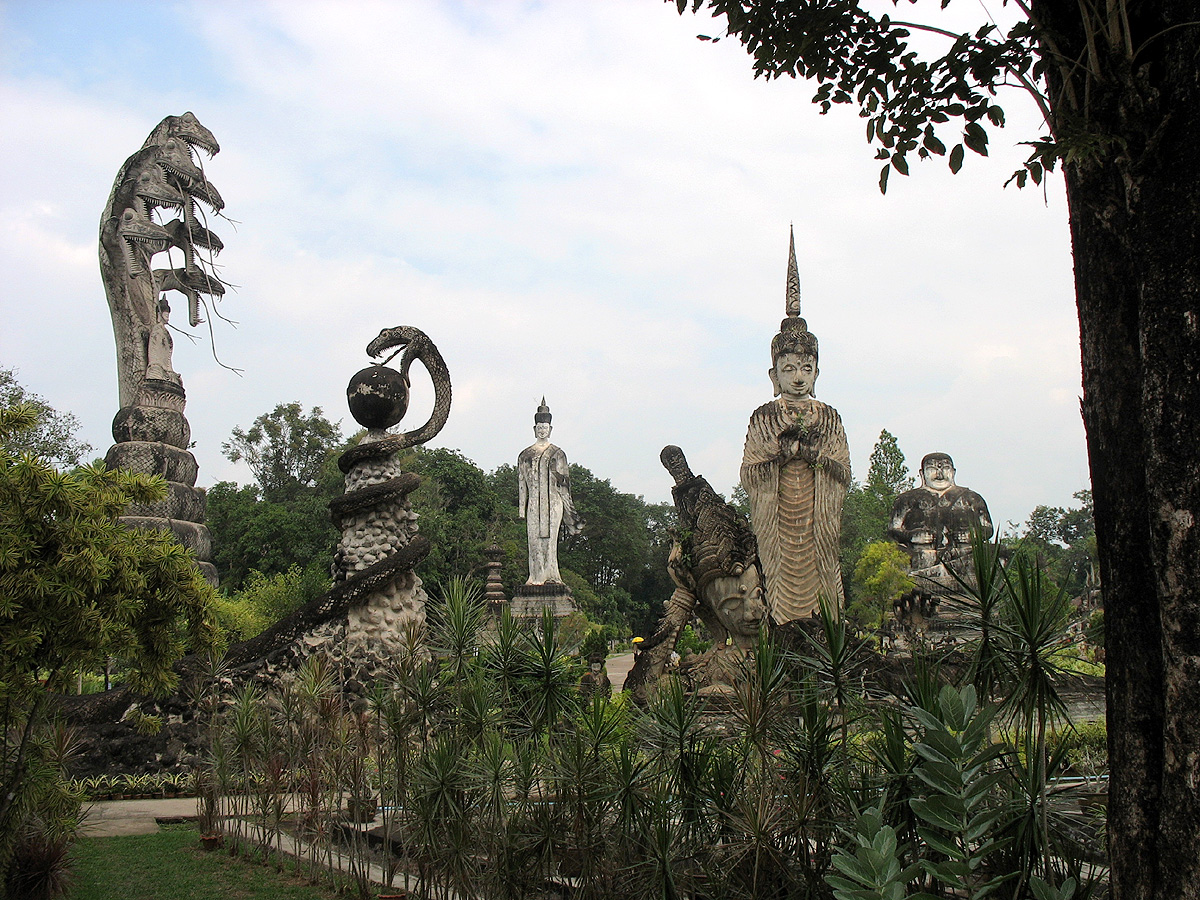
Sala Keoku sculpture park

Sulilat's sculpture gardens rely upon the rich religious art tradition of the region. What sets them apart is the uncommonly large physical dimensions (made possible through the use of modern construction materials), highly individualized (and even quirky) artistic fantasy, and sporadic contemporary references (motorized vehicles, firearms, Western garments).

Having been erected by unskilled workforce, the gardens present fine specimens of art naïf and art brut, and they certainly do possess the characteristic childish spontaneity and sense of wonder. (Sulilat claimed not to have had any artistic experience prior to the construction of Buddha Park.) Yet, once again, the monumental scale of the projects and the long-term, communal, organized nature of construction are quite remarkable for the realm of outsider art.

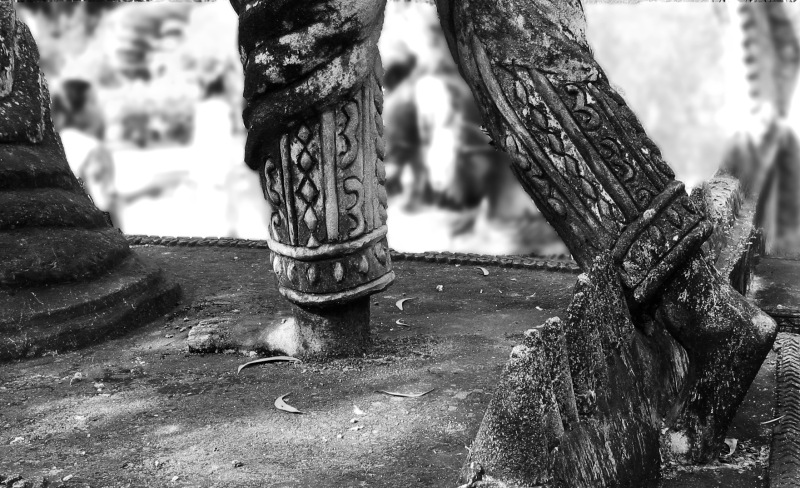
Sala Keoku: one step to Buddhahood

Reportedly, concrete has been chosen by Sulilat as the cheapest and most accessible material for his artwork. A large number of cement factories exist on the Lao side of Mekong. The statues have been designed by Sulilat himself, and subsequently built using (mostly) unpainted concrete reinforced with metal. Larger installations rely upon brick support structures in the interior.

Some parallels may be found between Sulilat's parks and the large-scale culture projects by Lek Viriyaphant, in particular, the fantastic woodcarving compositions of the Sanctuary of Truth. However, the latter have been designed and implemented on another financial scale with a large input of professional labor. So, compared to Sulilat's heritage, a very different balance between skilled finesse and immediate individual artistic expression is maintained in those projects. Wat Rong Khun is another example of a contemporary unconventional Thai Buddhist art site.

The didactic nature of Sulilat's vision found its most detailed expression in depictions of the karmic Wheel of Life present in both of his gardens. The version in Sala Keoku is the more elaborate of the two. Mixing traditional and contemporary figures arranged in a circular pattern, it reveals the human progression from birth to death, which returns to its own origin. The composition culminates as a young man takes a step across the fence enclosing the entire installation to become a Buddha statue on the other side.

== Spellings ==
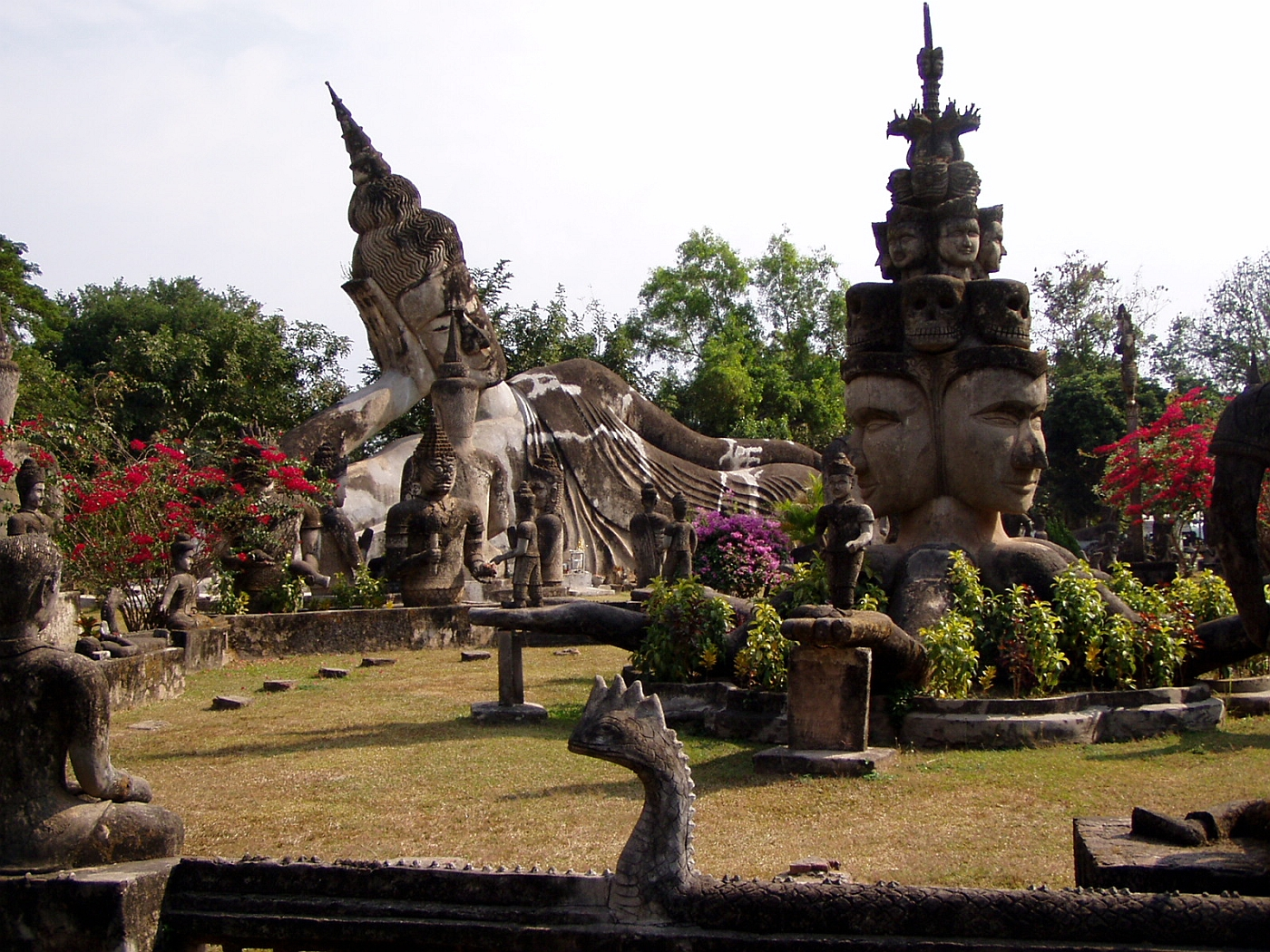
Buddha Park sculpture park

Due to the lack of standard romanization scheme for Thai and Lao, there is a profusion of different spellings for Bunleua Sulilat's name, as well as the names of his parks, to the extent that it makes all of them virtually impossible to account for.

His first name has been spelled as Bunleua, Bounleua, Bun Leua, Boun Leua, Boon Leua, Bounlua, Bounlour, Boonlour or Bunluea.

His last name has been spelled as Sulilat, Surirat, Soulilat, Sourirat, Sureerat or Su Ree Rat.

The title Luang Pu, the reverend monk, has also been spelled as Luang Puu, Luang Pa, Louang Pou or Loungpou.

The Buddha Park is also known as Wat Xiengkhouane, Wat Xieng Khouan, Wat Xiengkhuan, Wat Xieng Khuan or Vat Xiengkhuane.

Sala Keoku has also been referred to as Sala Keo Ku, Sala Keo Koo, Sala Keo Kou, Sala Kaew Ku, Sala Kaew Koo, Salakaewkoo, Sala Gaew Goo, Sala Kaeoku or Sala Kaeo Ku. It is also known as Wat Khaek, not to be confused with Wat Khaek, a Hindu temple in Bangkok.

== See also ==
- Visionary environments
- Outsider art
- Fantastic art
- Wat Rong Khun
- Sanctuary of Truth
- Wat Pa Maha Chedi Kaew
- First Thai–Lao Friendship Bridge
