= Buddha Park =

Sculpture park in Laos

- Xieng Khuan
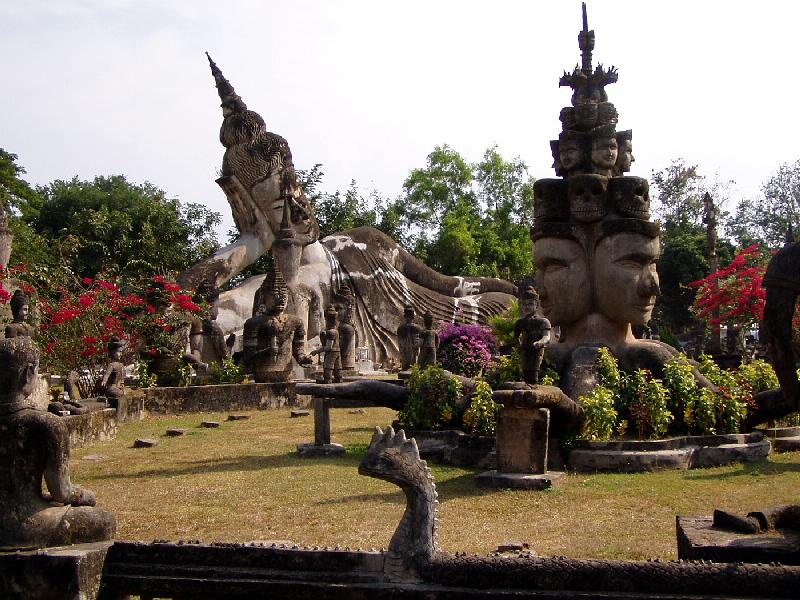
- Buddha Park

- Location within Laos
- Type: sculpture park
- Coordinates: 17.91229°N 102.765397°E

Buddha Park, also known as Xieng Khuan (as well as other variations of the spelling), is a sculpture park 25 km southeast from Vientiane, Laos, in a meadow by the Mekong River. Although it is not a temple (wat), it may be referred to as Wat Xieng Khuan (Lao: ວັດຊຽງຄວນ; Thai: วัดเซียงควน), since it contains numerous religious images. The name Xieng Khuan means "spirit city". The park contains over 200 Hindu and Buddhist statues. The socialist government operates Buddha Park as a tourist attraction and public park.

== Overview ==
The park was started in 1958 by Luang Pu Bunleua Sulilat, a priest-shaman who integrated Hinduism and Buddhism. His perspective was influenced by a Hindu rishi under whom he studied in Vietnam. After the revolution in 1975, anxious about the repercussions of the rule of the Pathet Lao, he fled from Laos to Thailand, where he built another sculpture park, Sala Keoku, in Nong Khai. Both parks are located right next to the Thai-Lao border, by the Mekong river, only a few kilometres apart from each other, and the tallest structures of Buddha Park can be seen from the Thai side of the Mekong.

The statues are made of reinforced concrete and are ornate in design. They appear to be centuries old, though they are not. There are sculptures of humans, gods, animals, and demons. There are numerous sculptures of Buddha, characters of Buddhist beliefs like Avalokiteśvara, and characters from Hindu lore, including Shiva, Vishnu, and Arjuna. The sculptures were presumably cast by unskilled workers under the supervision of Sulilat. One notable sculpture resembles a giant pumpkin. It has three stories, representing three levels of existence: hell, Earth, and heaven. Visitors can enter through an opening, which is the mouth of a 3-metre-tall demon head (9.8 ft), and climb several staircases from hell to heaven; each story contains sculptures depicting the respective level. At the top, there is a vantage point, from which the entire park is visible. Another sculpture, an enormous 40-metre-long (130 ft) reclining Buddha, forms the centerpiece attraction of the park.

== Gallery ==
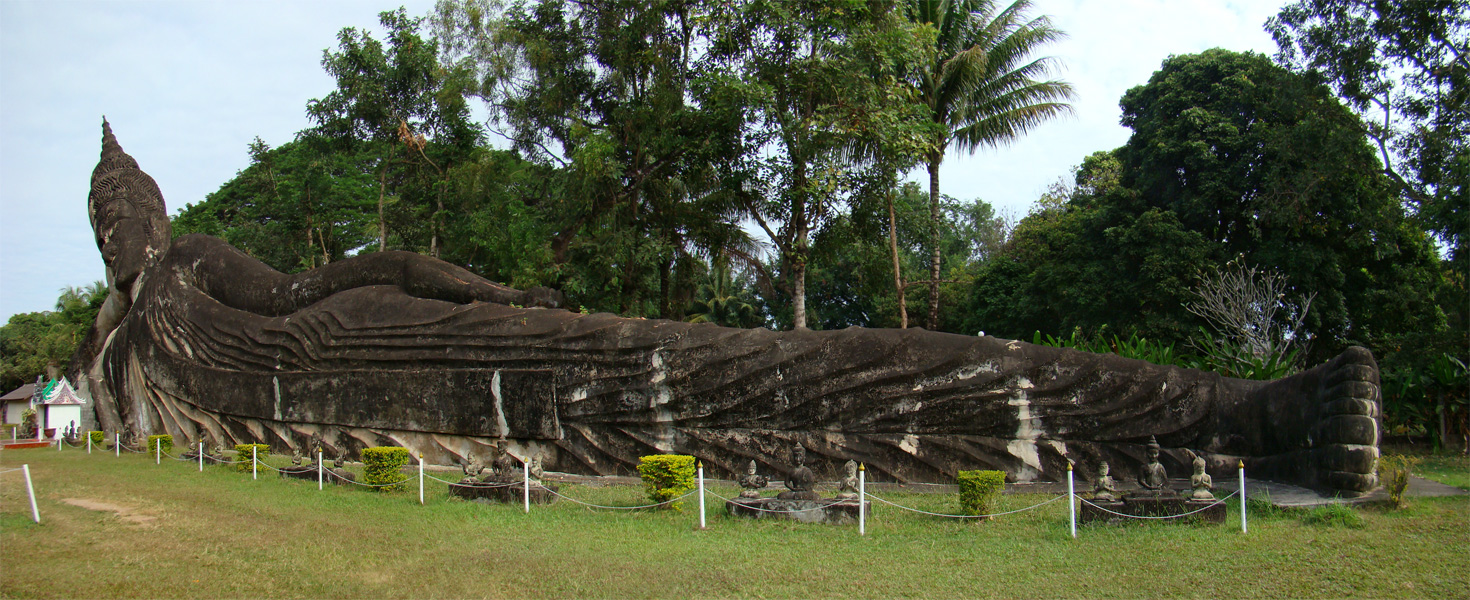

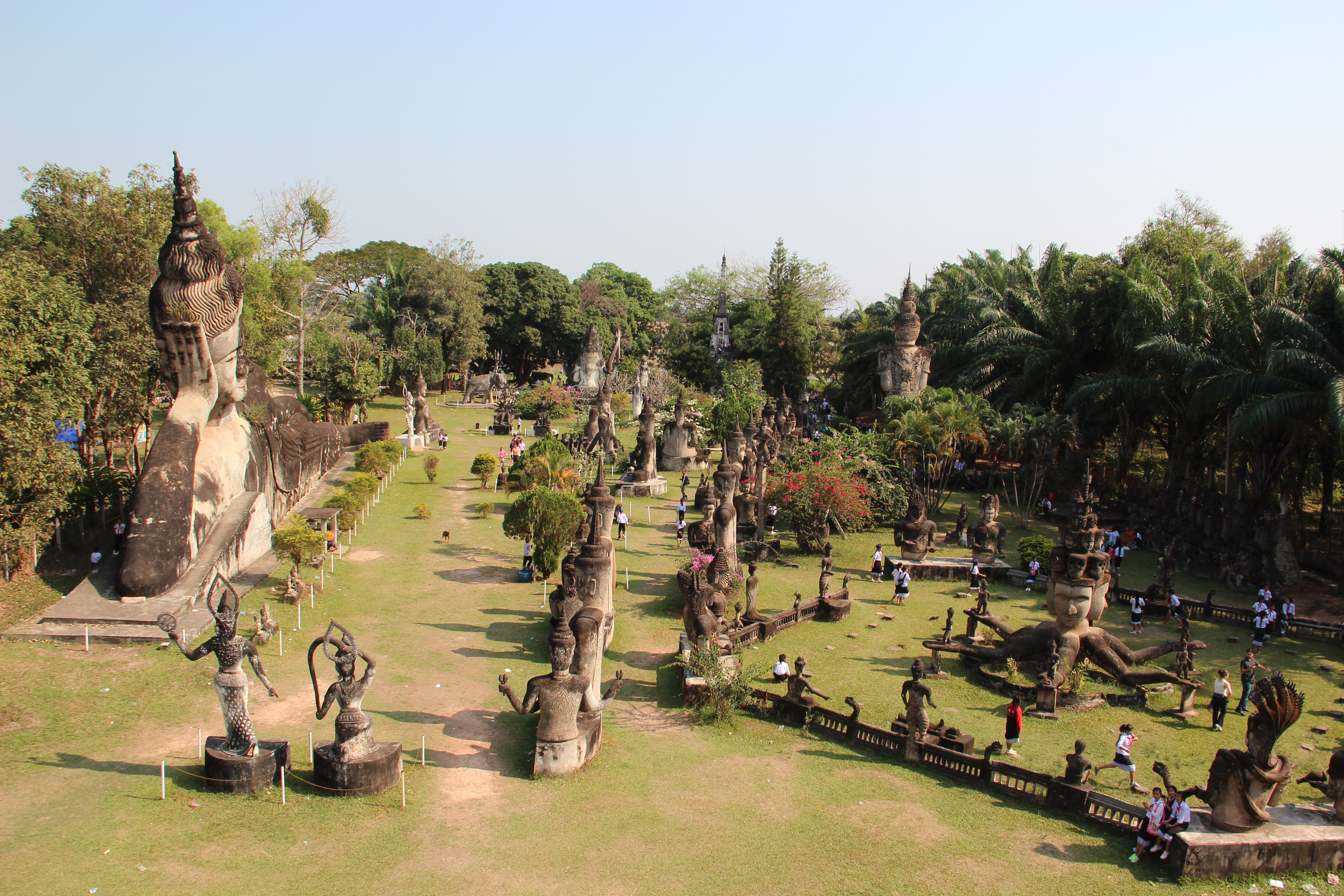
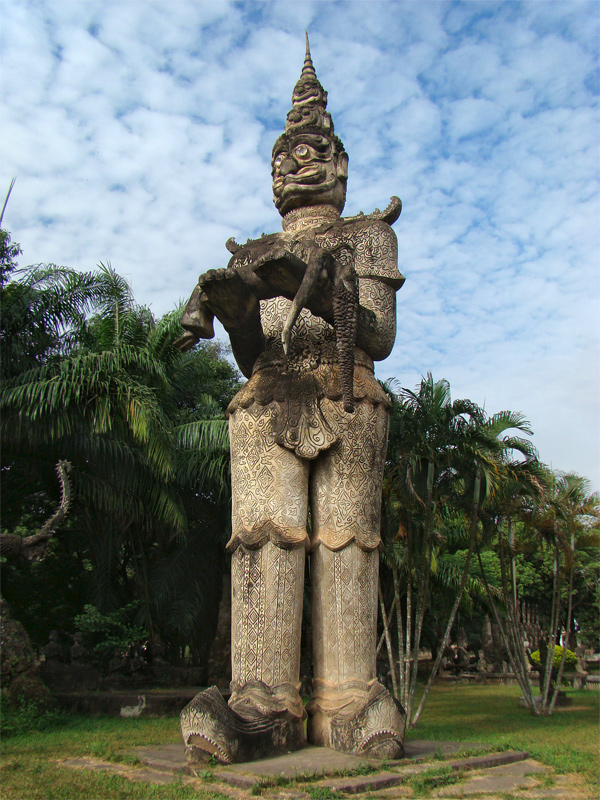

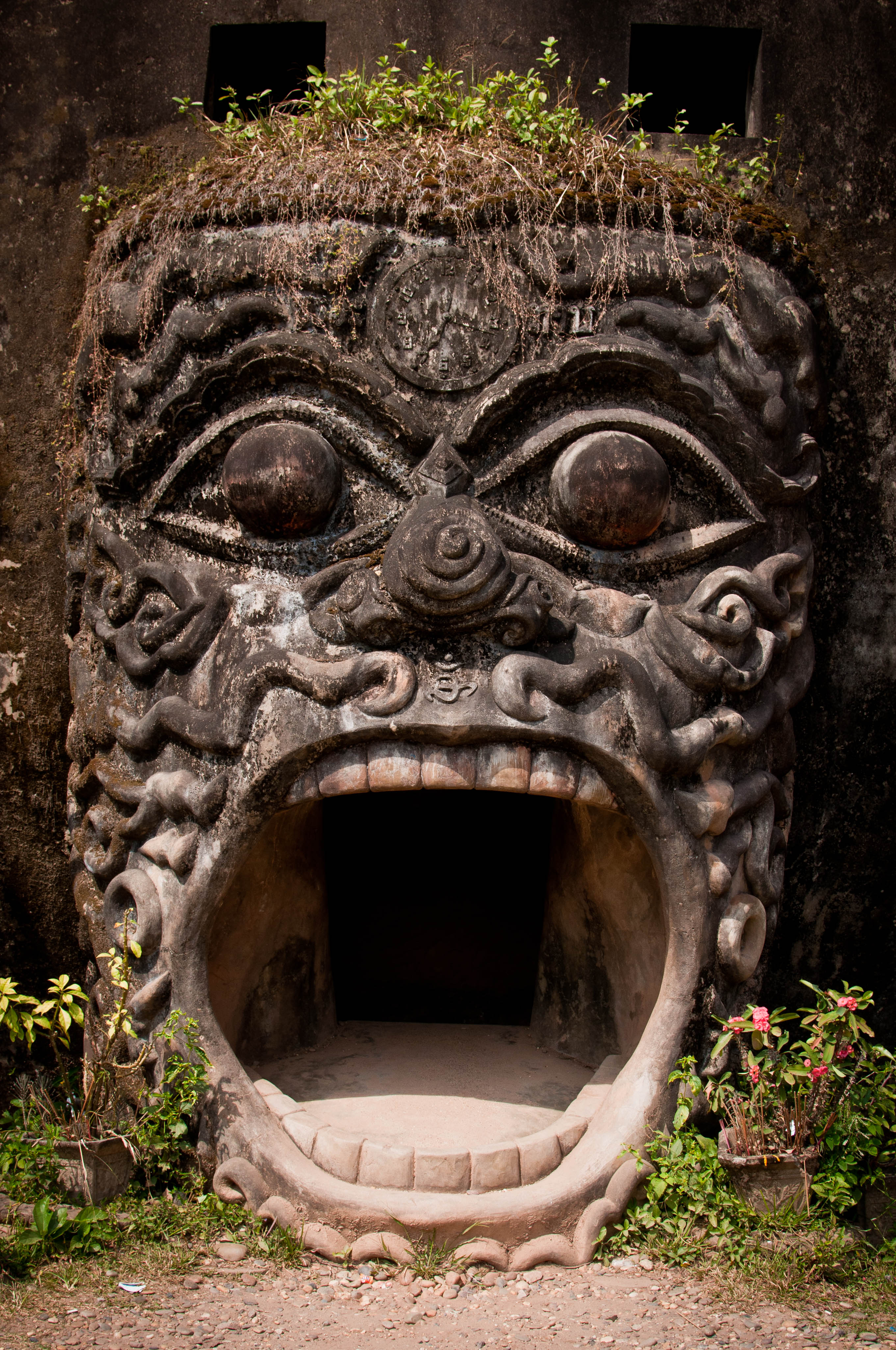

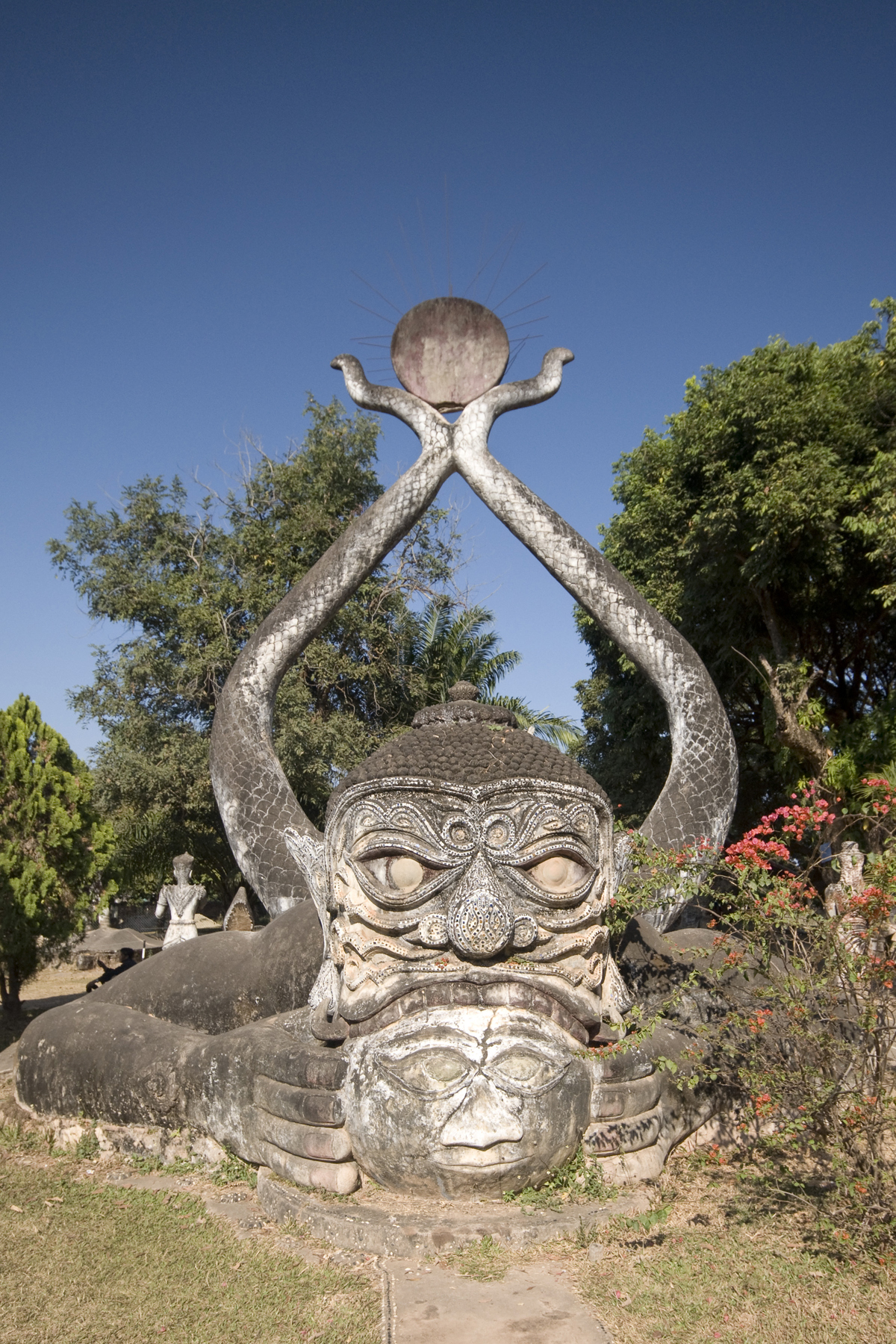

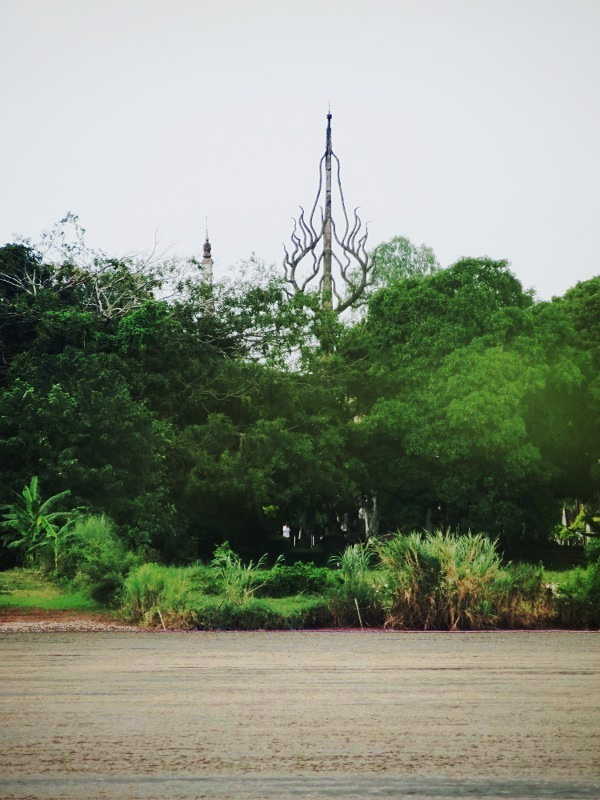

== See also ==
- Wat Rong Khun
- Sanctuary of Truth
- Wat Pa Maha Chedi Kaew
- Gardens of Bomarzo
- Visionary environments
- Outsider art
