= Al Uqsur =

Al Uqsur (Arabic for "the fortified"), may refer to:

- Luxor
- Al Uqsur Governorate
