= Kurna =

Kurna القرنة Gourna
- Town
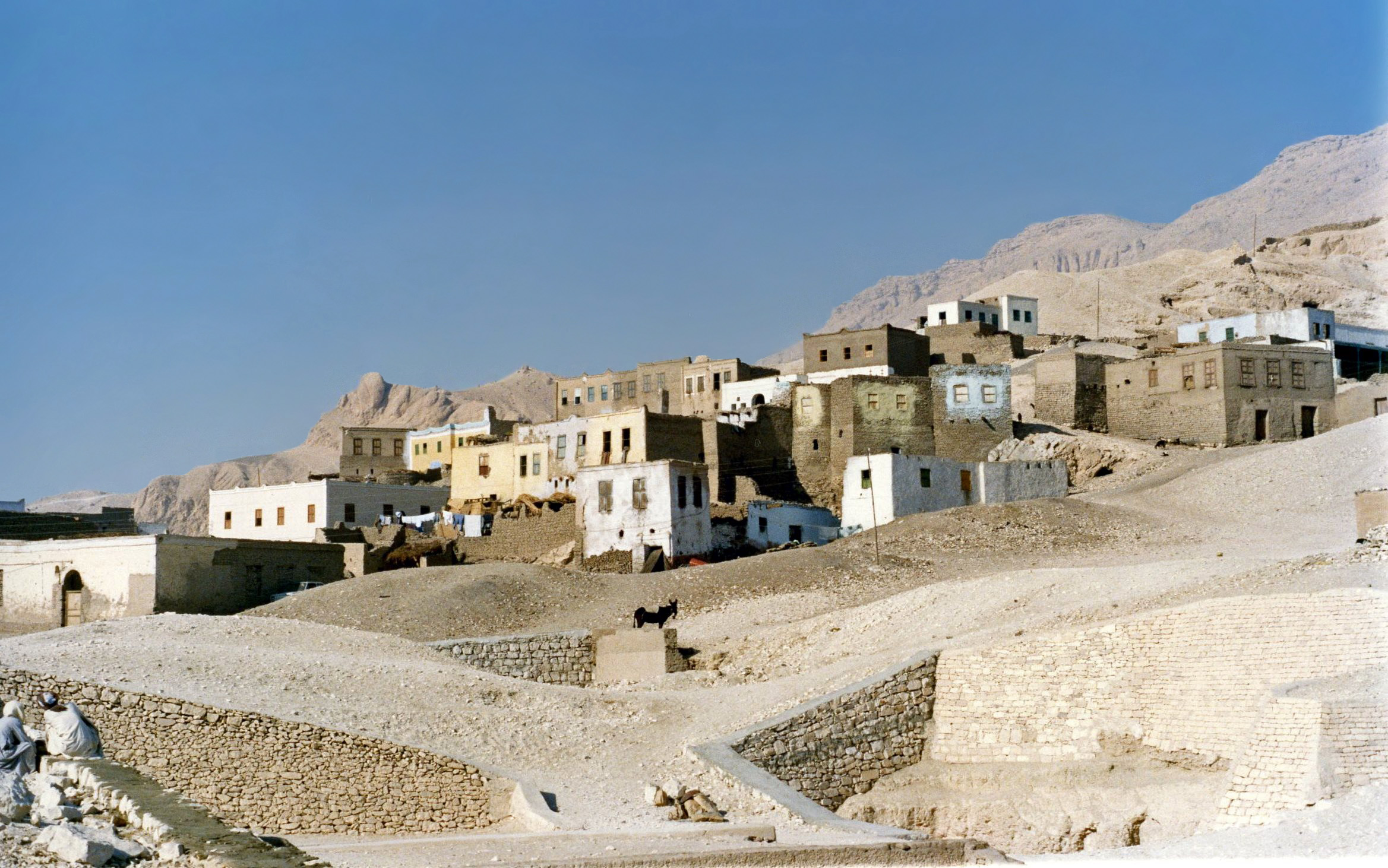
- Village of Qurna

- Location in Egypt
- Coordinates: 25°43′30″N 32°37′15″E
- Country: Egypt
- Governorate: Luxor Governorate
- Markaz: Qurnah District

Area
  - Total: 21.7 km^{2} (8.4 sq mi)
- Elevation: 104 m (341 ft)

Population (2023)
  - Total: 41,233
  - Density: 1,900/km^{2} (4,920/sq mi)
- Time zone: UTC+2 (EET)
  - Summer (DST): UTC+3 (EEST)

Kurna (also Gourna, Gurna, Qurna, Qurnah or Qurneh; Arabic: القرنة) is a group of three closely related villages (New Qurna, Qurna and Sheikh Abd el-Qurna) located on the West Bank of the River Nile opposite the modern city of Luxor in Egypt near the Theban Hills.

New Qurna was designed and built in the late 1940s and early 1950s by Egyptian architect Hassan Fathy to house people living in Qurna which is now uninhabited. New Qurna was added to the 2010 World Monuments Watch List of Most Endangered Sites to bring attention to the site's importance to modern town planning and vernacular architecture due to the loss of much of the original form of the village since it was built.

== Historical use of the name Qurna ==
The name Kurna signifies "a promontory" or "a point of a mountain".

Émile Amélineau identifies it with ancient Pekolol (Coptic: ⲡⲕⲟⲗⲟⲗ). The name Gourna is first mentioned by Protais and Charles François d'Orléans, two Capuchin missionary brothers travelling in Upper Egypt in 1668. Protais’ writing about their travel was published by Melchisédech Thévenot (Relations de divers voyages curieux, 1670s-1696 editions) and Johann Michael Vansleb (The Present State of Egypt, 1678).

References to Qurna, Gurna, Kournou, Gourna, El-Ckoor’neh, Gourne, el Abouab, El-Goor’neh or many other variants in pre-1940s literature refers to a spread out urban sprawl of housings stretching from approximately the Ramesseum (Mortuary Temple of Ramesses II) to the Mortuary Temple of Seti I on the east side of the Theban Hills, including the current place names of Sheikh Abd el-Qurna, el-Assasif, el-Khokha, Dra ’Abu el-Nage’ and Qurna.

During the 18th, 19th and 20th centuries, visitors and travelers to the area are rarely consistent in their use of the name and anything between Medinet Habu and the tombs of el-Tarif can at times be found referred to as part of a Qurna community.

A reference to the "Temple of Gourna" or similar, is in most cases a reference to the Ramesseum, to a lesser degree the Temple of Seti I and rarely it is a reference to the all but destroyed Mortuary temples of Ramesses IV, Thutmose III or Thutmose IV.

== The villages ==
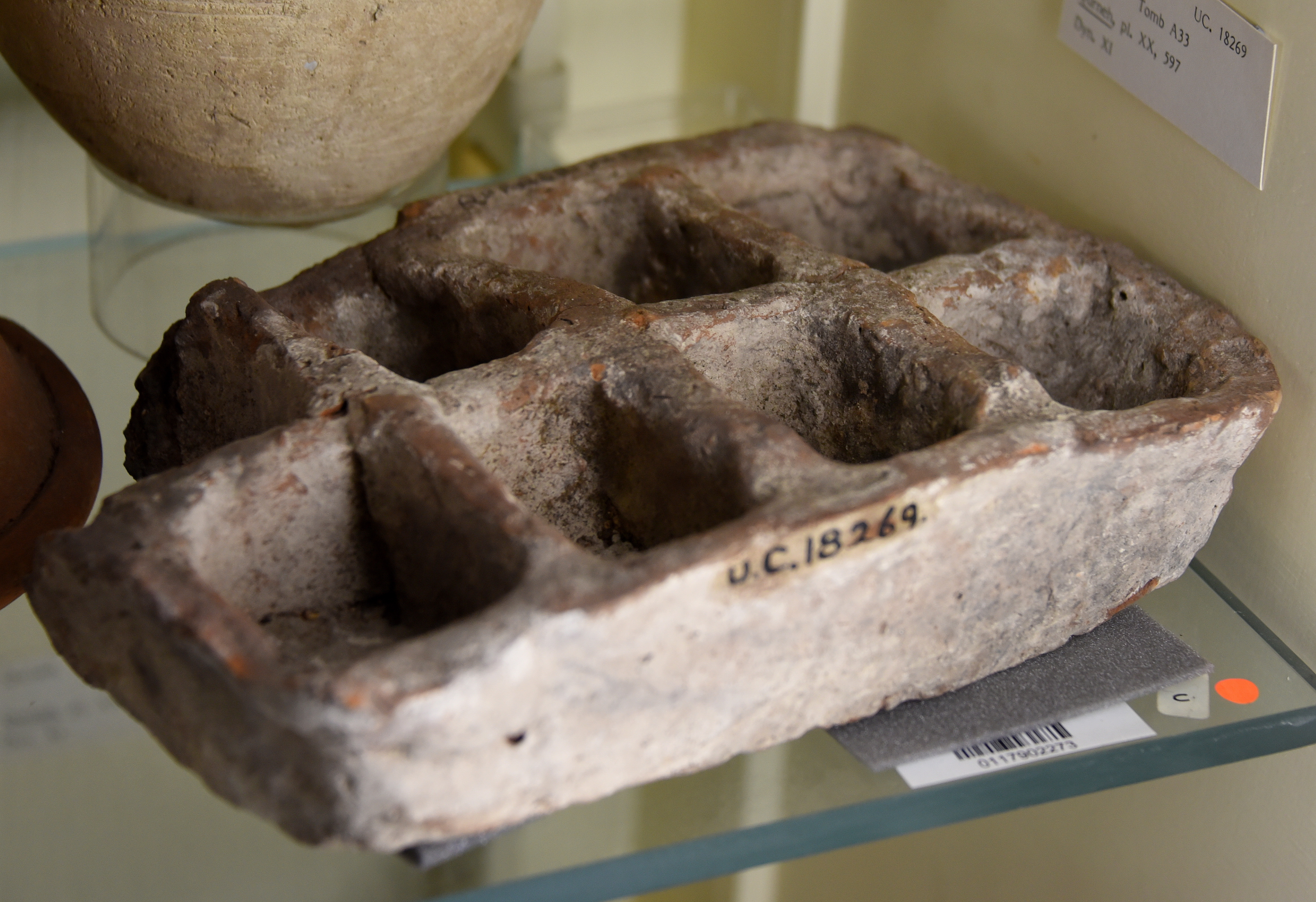
Pottery tray with 8 compartments. Redware, rectangular. 11th Dynasty. From Kurna (Qurnah), Egypt. Petrie Museum, London

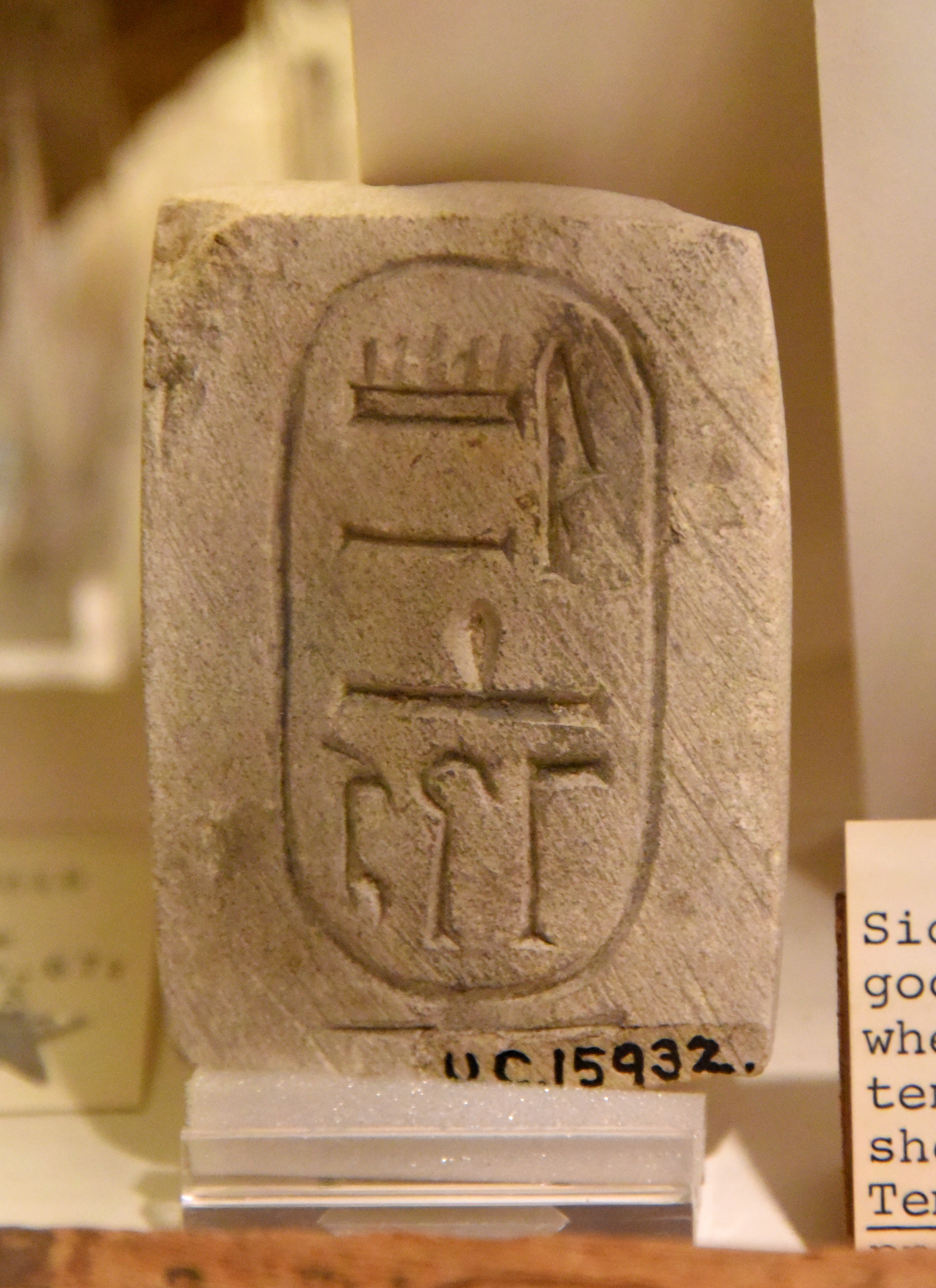
Foundation tablet. It shows the cartouche of the birth name and epithet "Amenhotep, the god, the Ruler of Thebes". 18th Dynasty. From Kurna, Egypt. Petrie Museum, London

=== New Qurna (or New Gourna) ===
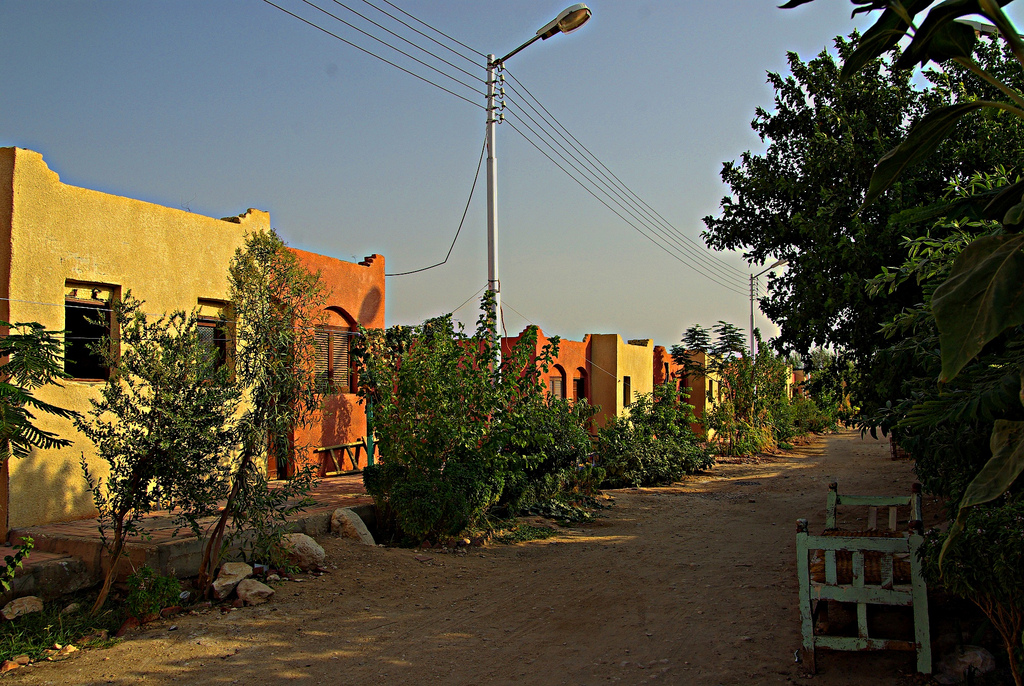
Street in New Gourna

Theater architectural drawing by Hassan Fathy

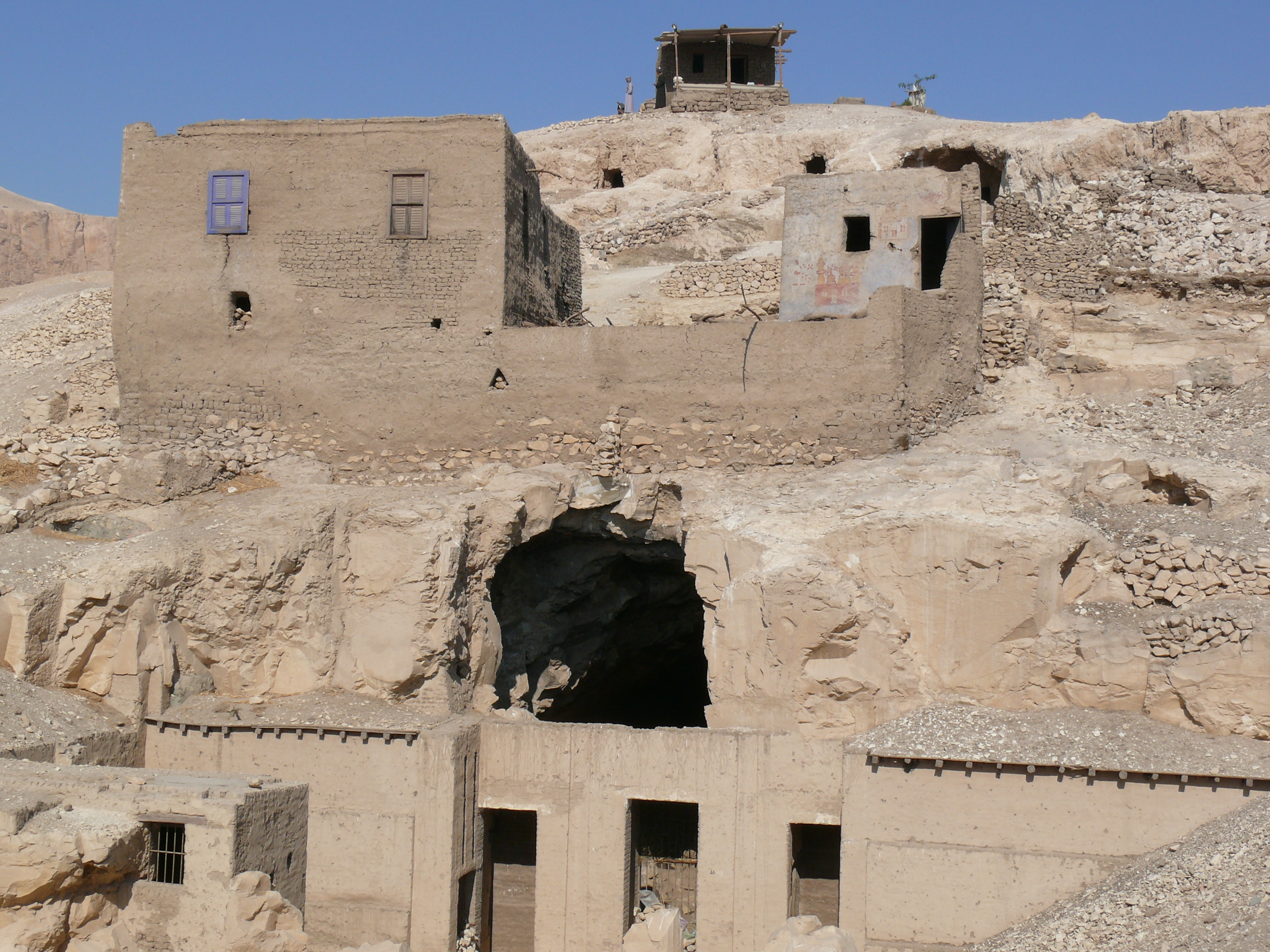
Old Qurna

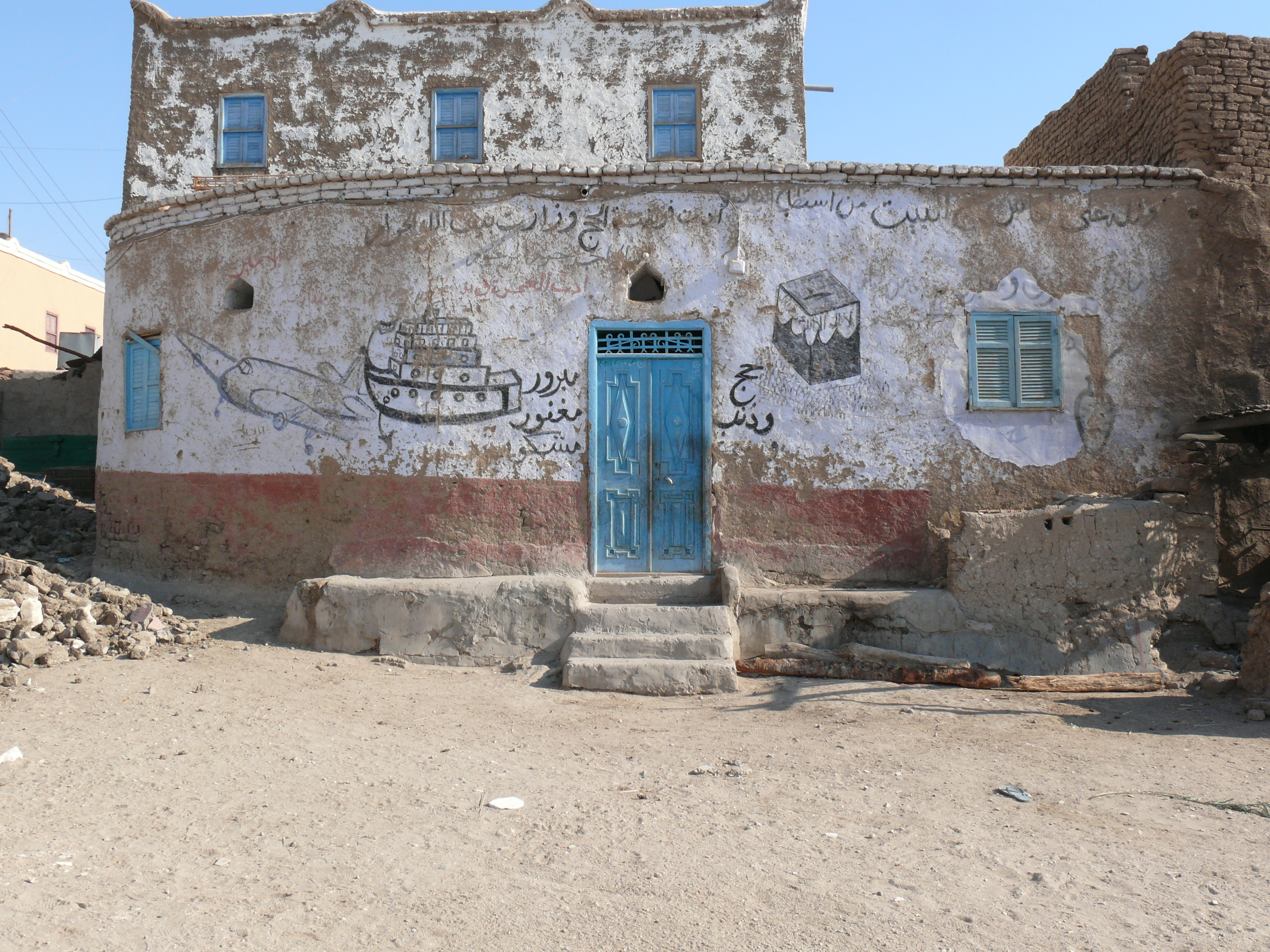
Sheikh Abd el-Qurna

New Qurna was built between 1946 and 1952 by Egyptian architect Hassan Fathy midway between the Colossi of Memnon and el-Gezira on the Nile on the main road to the Theban Necropolis to house the residents of the Qurna. New Qurna served to relocate the villagers, but it also served to be an experiment. The goal was to make the low cost buildings, as well as environment friendly structures. With Old Qurna, there was not many vegetation due to the difficulties in accessing water. New Qurna was designed to improve on Old Qurna and solved problems such as difficulties in accessing water. New Qurna was built near the Nile River resulting more in the use of vegetation. Due to the village not having any electricity, cooling and heating techniques were implemented within New Qurna. With the weather being warm, it would still feel cool within the houses. When the weather would be cool, the homes would stay warm. The design, which combined traditional materials and techniques with modern principles was never completed and much of the fabric of the village has since been lost; all what remains today of the original New Qurna is the mosque, market and a few houses. UNESCO World Heritage conservation wishes to safeguard this important architectural site. The World Monuments Fund included New Qurna in the 2010 World Monuments Watch List of Most Endangered Sites.

==== New Qurna downside ====
Many of the buildings that were built had foundations of salt stones. Due to the high humidity, the salt stones would dissolve, causing the structure of the houses to fail. Villagers would need to adjust and fix their homes every few months in order for the house to remain intact.

=== Qurna (or Old Gourna) ===
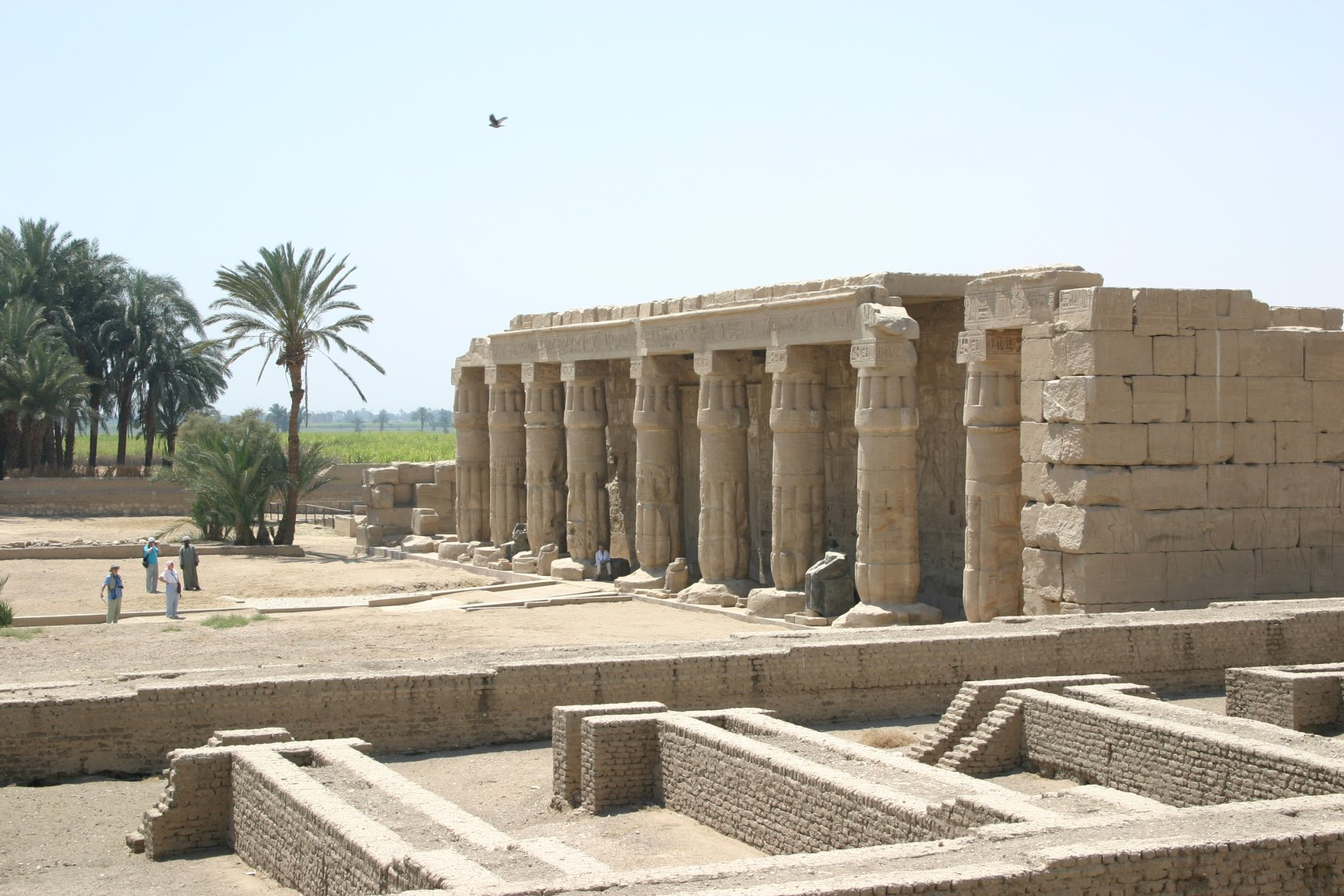
Temple of Seti I at Qurna.

Qurna is an abandoned village about 100m to the east of the Temple of Seti I. Until the early 19th century the community included at least parts of the Temple of Seti I. Several travellers, including Richard Pococke or Sonnini de Manoncourt even name a Sheikh of Qurna. Edward William Lane relates in 1825 that the village was abandoned and not a single inhabitant lived there. Comments by Isabella Frances Romer suggests that the resettling started in the late 1840s. Hassan Fathy alleges that the inhabitants of Qurna lived in poverty and thus were robbing ancient tombs as means of subsistence. Families of the villagers settled down on top of the selected tombs where they would build their houses. Villagers built alongside the tombs, as the tombs became a part of the house. Looted items would either be sold, or kept around the homes of the villagers. In order to stop the looting the Department of Antiquities expropriated the land on which the Qurnis lived and decided to move them to a new settlement, to be designed and built by Hassan Fathy himself. No two houses in the village are the same. Kurnis built and shaped the houses and all of the furniture within; including any kind of chairs, tables, beds. New Qurna was built in the 1940s and early 1950 to house the then residents who strongly resisted the move.

=== Sheikh Abd el-Qurna ===
A series of housing built in and around the mountain grottoes located about 200m north of the Ramesseum at Sheikh Abd el-Qurna. The stretch of land has been the bitter battlefield between the original owners and the Egyptian government for the last 60 years, because it lay on top of an archeological area, part of the Tombs of the Nobles. Edward William Lane relates that the residents moved into these grottoes from the village of Qurna, which they abandoned, when the Mamluks retreated thought the area, following their defeat by Muhammad 'Alī's forces in the early 19th century.

== Restoration at New Gourna ==
World Monuments Fund video on conservation of New Qurna

== See also ==
- List of ancient Egyptian sites, including sites of temples
