= Al Zayniyyah =

Al Zayniyyah الزينية
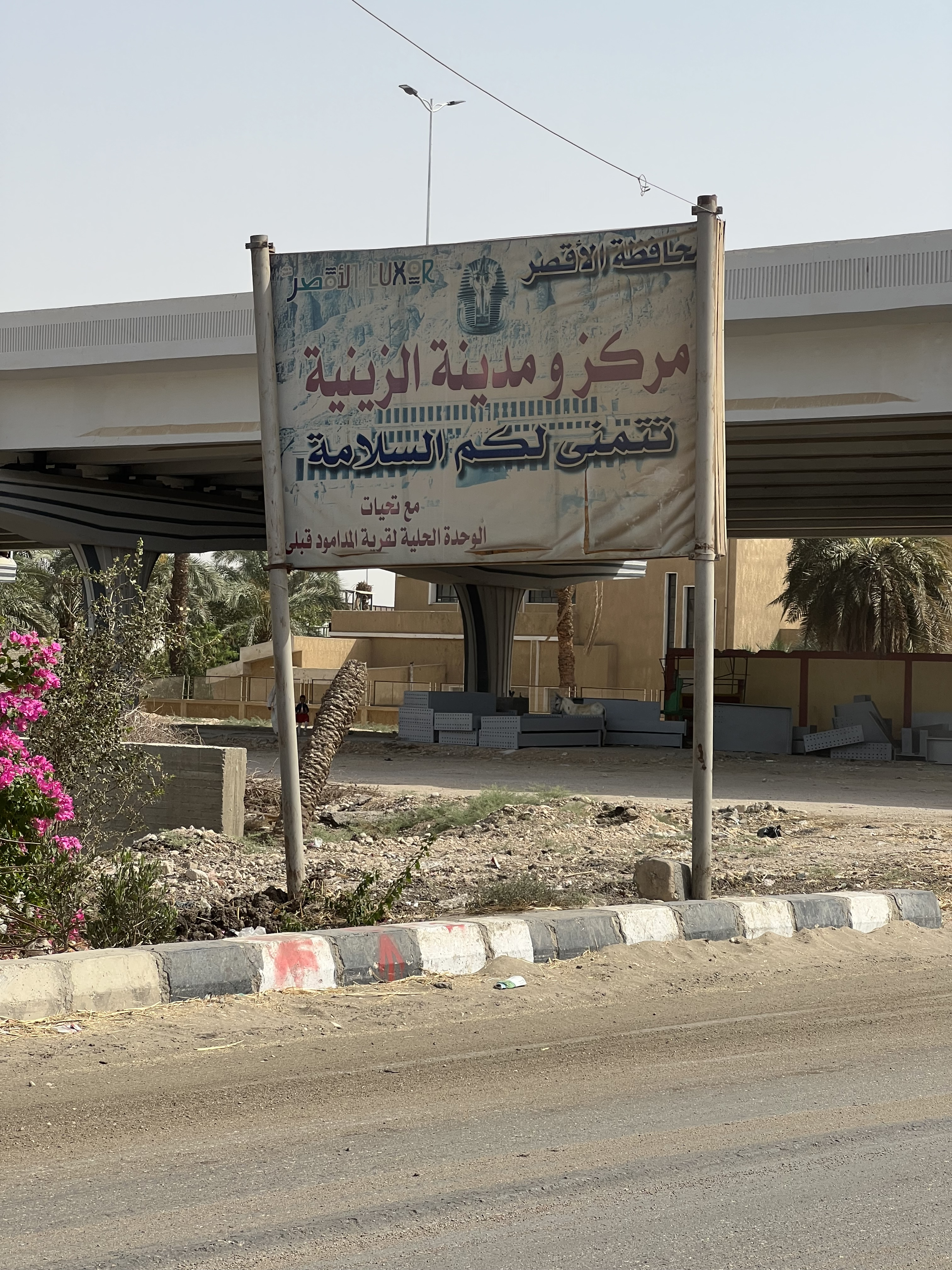

- Location within Egypt
- Coordinates: 25°45′03″N 32°40′39″E
- Country: Egypt

Area
  - Total: 100 km^{2} (39 sq mi)

Population
  - Total: 25,000
- Time zone: UTC+2 (EET)
  - Summer (DST): UTC+3 (EEST)

Al Zayniyyah (Arabic: الزينية) is a markaz and affiliated city in Luxor Governorate in Egypt established in 2007. It has a population of about 65,000 people, of whom about 40,000 are men and about 25,000 are women.

== See also ==
- List of cities and towns in Egypt
