= Hassan Fathy =

Egyptian architect (1900–1989)

- حسن فتحي
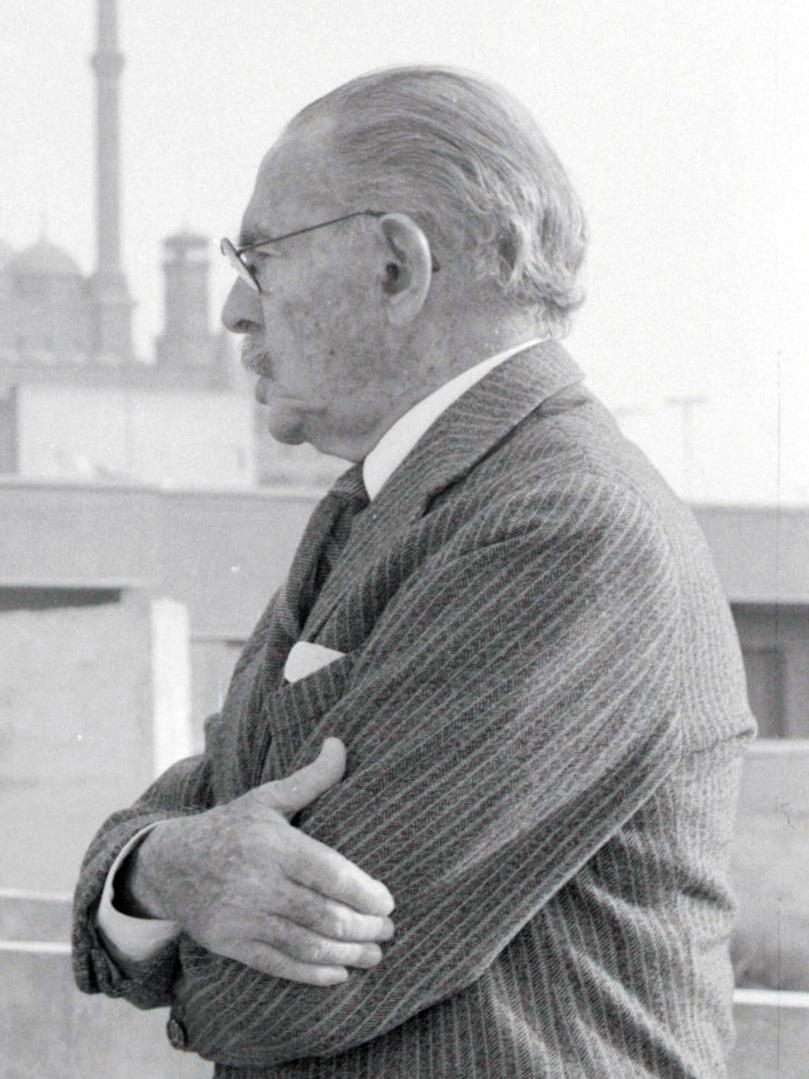
- Born: March 23, 1900; Alexandria, Egypt
- Died: November 30, 1989 (aged 89); Cairo, Egypt
- Occupation: Architect
- Awards: Aga Khan Chairman's Award for Architecture (1980); Balzan Prize (1980); Right Livelihood Award (1980); UIA Gold Medal (1984)
- Buildings: New Qurna

Hassan Fathy (Egyptian Arabic: حسن فتحي; March 23, 1900 – November 30, 1989) was a noted Egyptian architect who pioneered appropriate technology for building in Egypt, especially by working to reestablish the use of adobe and traditional mud construction as opposed to western building designs, material configurations, and lay-outs. Fathy was recognized with the Aga Khan Chairman's Award for Architecture in 1980.

== Personal life ==
Hassan Fathy was born in Alexandria to a Middle Class Upper Egyptian family. He studied and trained as an architect in Egypt, graduating in 1926 from the King Fuad University (now Cairo University). Fathy married Aziza Hassanein, sister of Ahmed Hassanein. He was influenced by Upper Egyptian and simple rural architecture, he designed a villa with the southern style for his wife along the Nile in Maadi, which was later destroyed to make way for the new corniche. He also designed her brother's mausoleum (1947), along Salah Salem, in Neo-Mamluk style.

== Career ==
Hassan Fathy was a cosmopolitan trilingual professor-engineer-architect, amateur musician, dramatist, and inventor. He designed nearly 160 separate projects, from modest country retreats to fully planned communities with police, fire, and medical services, markets, schools, theatres, and places for worship and recreation. These communities included many functional buildings such as laundry facilities, ovens, and wells. He utilized ancient design methods and materials, as well as knowledge of the rural Egyptian economic situation with a wide knowledge of ancient architectural and town design techniques. He trained local inhabitants to make their own materials and build their own buildings.

=== Early career; New Gourna ===
He began teaching at the College of Fine Arts in 1930 and designed his first adobe buildings in the late 1930s.

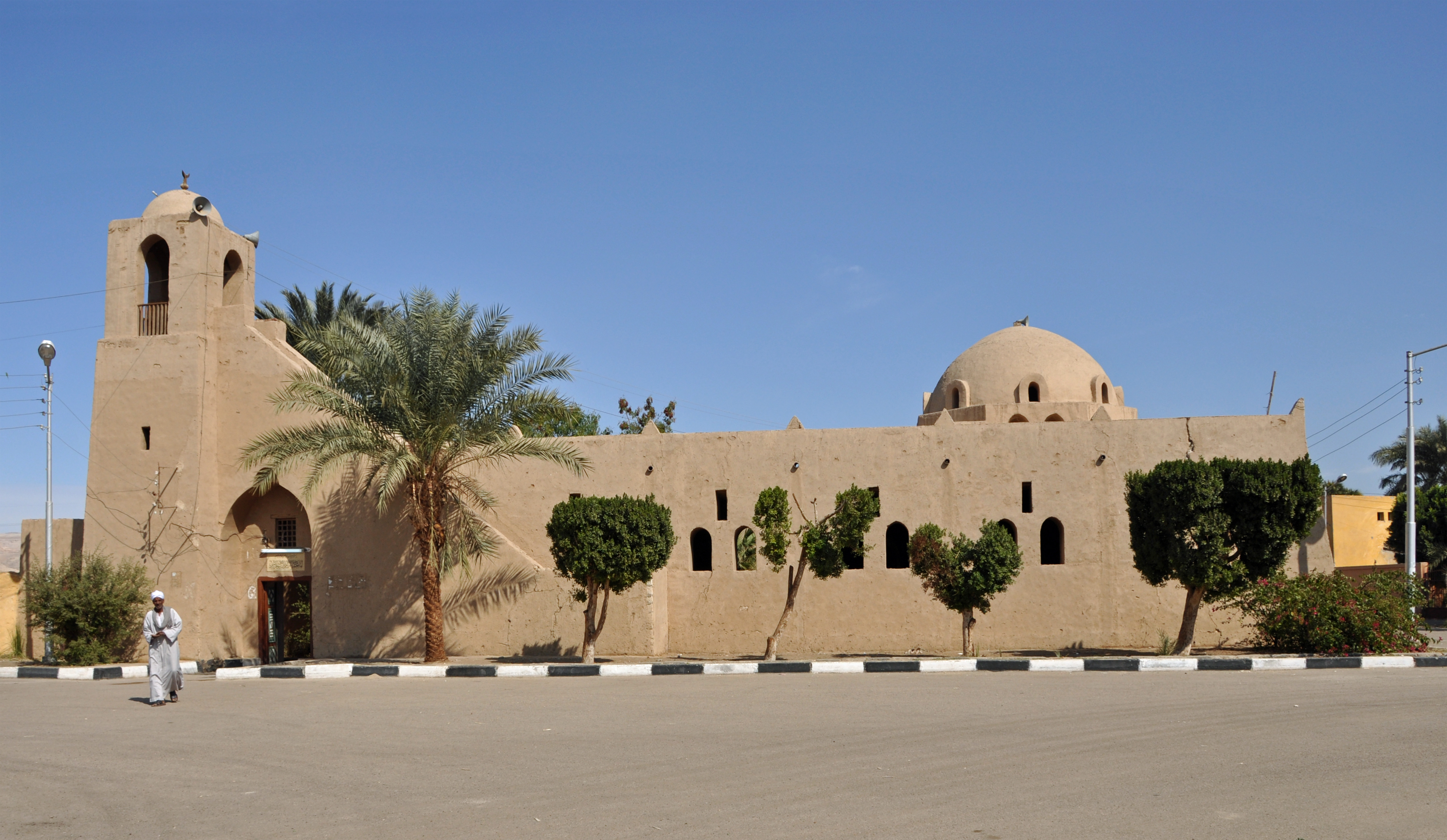
The mosque at Kurna, Luxor by Hassan Fathy

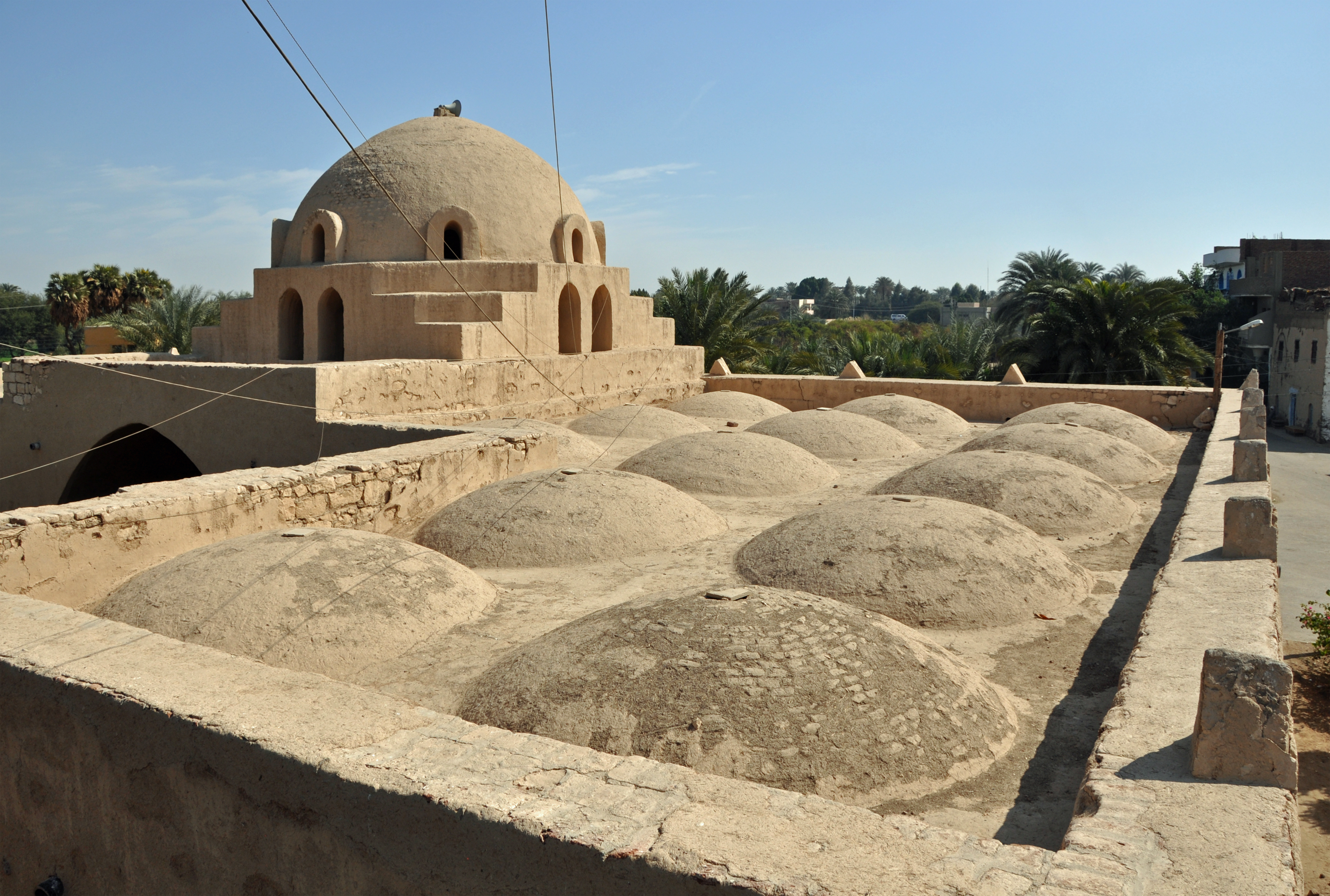
Roof and dome of the mosque at Kourna seen from the minaret

Fathy gained international critical acclaim for his involvement in the construction of New Gourna, located on Luxor's West Bank, built to resettle the village of Gourna, which fell within the archaeological areas of the Valley of the Kings and the Valley of the Queens.

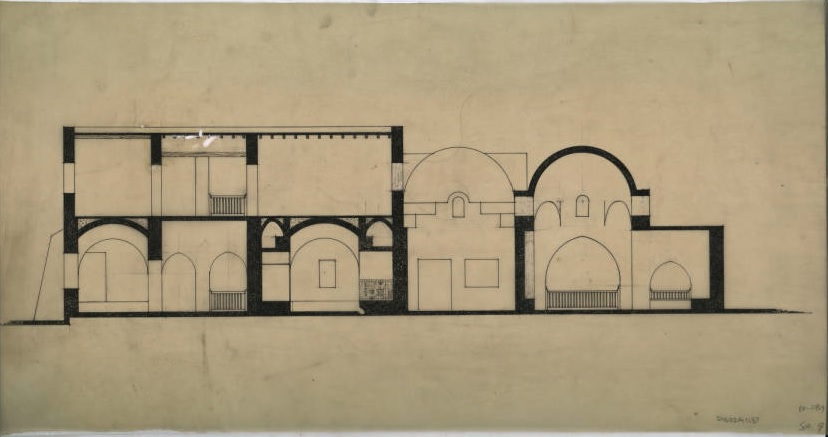
New Gourna Village - Craft's Exhibition - Section

Fathy's plan devised groundbreaking approaches to economic, social, and aesthetic issues that typically impact the construction of low-cost housing.

With regard to the economic issues, Fathy noted that structural steel was not an apt choice for a poor country, and that even materials such as cement, timber, and glass did not make good economic sense. To address this issue, Fathy instead devised a plan that included the use of appropriate technology, notably mud brick construction.

Noting that the traditional village, although afflicted with issues of overcrowding and poor sanitation was also an expression of “a living society in all its complexity,” Fathy strived to design New Gourna in a manner that addressed the social concerns, including attempting to consult directly with "every family in Gourna" and advocating for the involvement of social ethnographers in the planning process. Despite this, inhabitants of the former village were not enthusiastic about relocating, which effectively cut them off from their existing livelihood of trading in archaeological finds.

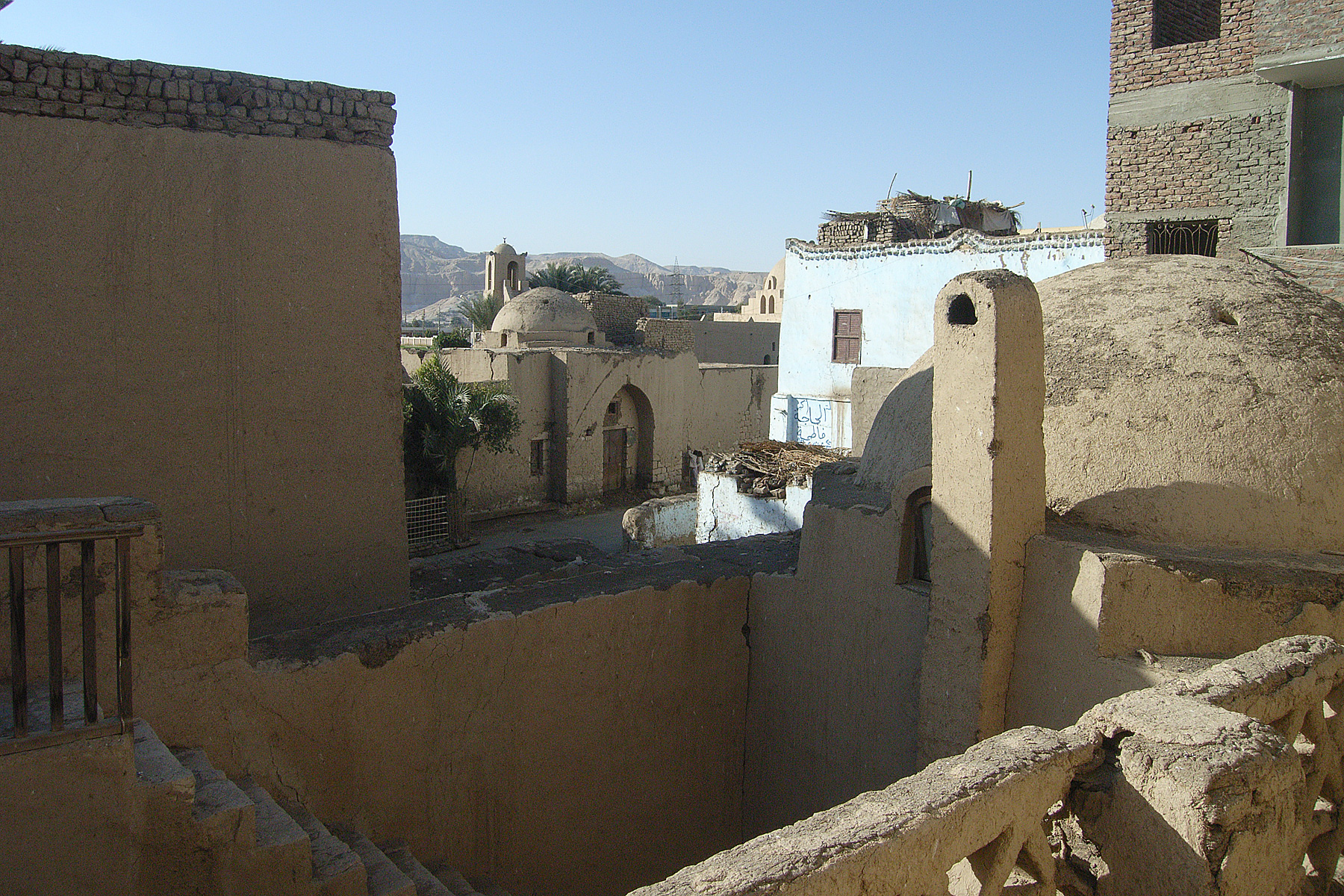
Dwelling houses in New Gourna

With regard to aesthetic issues, Fathy placed emphasis on traditional Nubian architectural designs which he observed in a 1941 trip to the region (enclosed courtyards; vaulted roofing), yielding what Fathy described as "spacious, lovely, clean, and harmonious houses." He also made use of traditional Nubian ornamental techniques (claustra, a form of mud latticework), as well as vernacular architecture techniques of the Gourna region. Some critics have observed, however, that Fathy's project for Gourna is not a superlative example of how to prioritize vernacular architecture in an urban plan, given that the domed architecture Fathy championed is traditionally used for funerary architecture rather than residential or domestic spaces.

Despite the effort, and also the proper issues he tackled while building New Gourna, through his publication, Architecture for the Poor, he describes the "Gourna Experiment" as a failure. He mentions in Architecture for the Poor that the Gourna experiment failed." He further describes the sense of failure that due to the village not being completed and the construction being halted, the theory of mud brick construction was seen even more cranky and impractical. Despite the theory being completely lost, that there wasn't anyone that tried to find other practical ways of getting peasant houses built efficiently. There were more issues he came across, such as him stating "This is because no architect knows the real cost of building." Although he dives further into that thought, by speaking on how nobody realistically knows the price or cost, because we’re at the mercy of the economy. Despite the negative outlooks he had writing these books, he managed to make Gourna a community, and till this day is still preserved with only 40% of the original buildings being lost. It's still standing due to being placed on the 2010 World Monuments Watch, and UNESCO and World Monuments Fund joined forces.

=== Later career ===
In 1953 he returned to Cairo, heading the Architectural Section of the Faculty of Fine Arts in 1954.

Fathy's next major engagement was designing and supervising school construction for Egypt's Ministry of Education.

Through his work of the years, and especially after New Gourna, he targeted bureaucracy being one of the leading reasons that the experiment failed, which influenced later actions such as in 1957, frustrated with bureaucracy and convinced that buildings designed with traditional methods appropriate to the climate of the area would speak louder than words, he moved to Athens to collaborate with international planners evolving the principles of ekistical design under the direction of Constantinos Apostolou Doxiadis. He served as the advocate of traditional natural-energy solutions in major community projects for Iraq and Pakistan and undertook extended travel and research for the "Cities of the Future" program in Africa.

Returning to Cairo in 1963, he moved to Darb al-Labbana, near the Cairo Citadel, where he lived and worked for the rest of his life. He also did public speaking and private consulting. He was a man with a riveting message in an era searching for alternatives in fuel, personal interactions, and economic supports.

He left his first major international position, at the American Association for the Advancement of Science in Boston, in 1969 to complete multiple trips per year as a leading critical member of the architectural profession.

His participation in the first U.N. Habitat conference in 1976 in Vancouver was followed shortly by two events that significantly shaped the rest of his activities. He began to serve on the steering committee for the nascent Aga Khan Award for Architecture and he founded and set guiding principles for his Institute of Appropriate Technology.

He was part in 1979 of a colloquium entitled in his honour 'Architecture for the Poor' in Corsica (France) Alzipratu.

In 1980, he was awarded the Balzan Prize for Architecture and Urban Planning and the Right Livelihood Award.

Fathy designed the mosque and madrasa, constructed with adobe, at Dar al-Islam, an educational center near Abiquiú, New Mexico, US. The main buildings were completed in 1981, and Dar al-Islam opened in 1982.

== Death ==
Hassan Fathy died of natural causes on November 30, 1989, at his home in Cairo, Egypt.

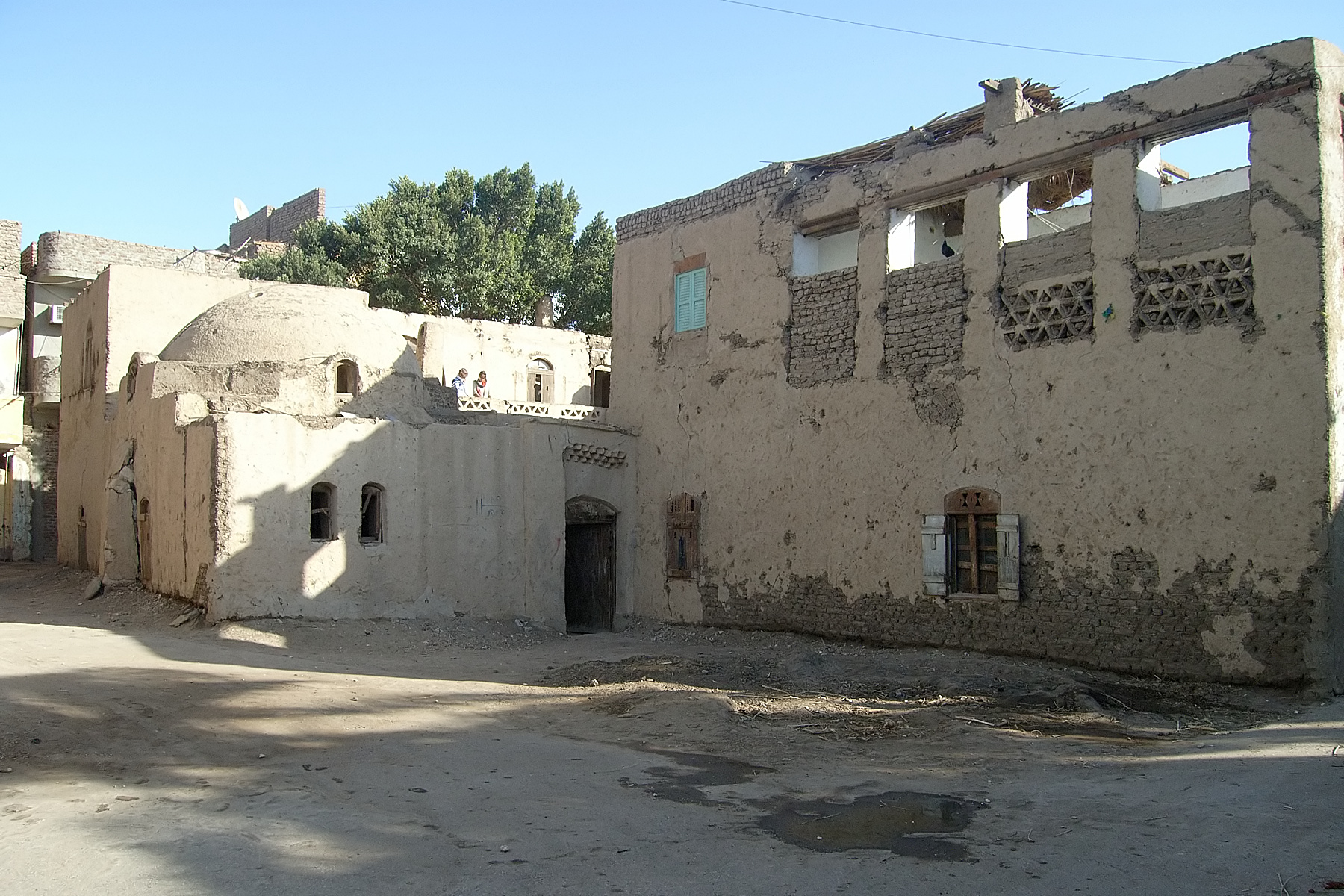
The remains of a house in New Gourna

== Legacy ==
Fathy has been called Egypt's best-known architect since Imhotep.

Fathy's New Gourna project was applauded in a popular British weekly in 1947 and soon after in a British professional journal; further articles were published in Spanish, French and in Dutch. Later, Fathy would author a book on the New Gourna project, initially published by Cairo's Ministry of Culture in a limited edition in 1969, entitled Gourna: A Tale of Two Villages. In 1973 it was republished by the University of Chicago as Architecture for the Poor: An Experiment in Rural Egypt.

A full appreciation of the importance of Fathy's contribution to world architecture became clear only as the twentieth century waned. Climatic conditions, public health considerations, and ancient craft skills also affected his design decisions. Based on the structural massing of ancient buildings, Fathy incorporated dense brick walls and traditional courtyard forms to provide passive cooling. Fathy is also renowned for having revived the traditional Nubian vault.

National Life Stories conducted an oral history interview (C467/37) with Hassan Fathy in 1986 for its Architects Lives' collection held by the British Library.

Hassan Fathy made use of windcatchers and other passive cooling and passive ventilation methods from traditional architecture. He wrote a book on them.

Fathy is featured in the documentary Il ne suffit pas que dieu soit avec les pauvres (1978) by Borhane Alaouié and Lotfi Thabet.

== Collection ==
Hassan Fathy's entire archive which includes his architectural plans, photographs and documents is housed at the Rare Books and Special Collections Library at the American University in Cairo.' The collection includes around 5000 architectural plans, 15,000 photographs and his correspondences, writings and other collected papers and materials.

== Publications ==
Hassan Fathy has a number of publications. His first book Architecture for the Poor, was initially published by the Egyptian Ministry of Culture in 1969 under the title Al-Gurna: A Tale of Two Villages.

There is also a number of books about Hassan Fathy:

- El-Wakil, Hassan Fathy dans son temps, Infolio, 2013 (edited volume)
- El-Wakil, L. 2018. Hassan Fathy: an architectural life. The American University in Cairo Press, New York; Cairo (edited volume)
- Damluji, S. and Bertini, V., 2018. Hassan Fathy: Earth & Utopia. London: Laurence King.
- Dávid, Dóra and Vasáros, Zsolt (2020) Publications of the Office of the Hungarian Cultural Counsellor in Cairo 2018-2019. Current Research of the Hassan Fathy Survey Mission in Egypt. Project Report. Department of Industrial and Agricultural Building Design and Office of the Hungarian Cultural Counsellor in Cairo, Budapest and Cairo.

== See also ==
- Agha Khan Foundation, private international development agency
- List of Egyptian architects
  - Abdel-Wahed El-Wakil (born 1943), specialised in mosques
  - Ramses Wissa Wassef (1911–1974)
- Laurie Baker (1917–2007), British-born Indian architect
- Geoffrey Bawa (1919–2003), Sri Lankan architect
- Charles Correa (1930–2015), Indian architect and urban planner
- Nayyar Ali Dada (born 1943), Pakistani architect
- Muzharul Islam (1923–2012), Bangladeshi architect and urban planner

== Bibliography ==
- Fathy, Hassan (1976) [1973]. Architecture for the Poor : An Experiment in Rural Egypt. Chicago: University of Chicago Press. ISBN 9780226239163. OCLC 1020172729.
- Fathy, Hassan (1986). Shearer, Walter (ed.). Natural Energy and Vernacular Architecture : Principles and Examples, With Reference to Hot Arid Climates. University of Chicago Press. ISBN 9780226239170. OCLC 1036744049.
- Abdel-moniem El-Shorbagy, Hassan Fathy: The Power of Belief. Lambert Academic Publishing, Germany, 2017.
- Abdel-moniem El-Shorbagy, Hassan Fathy: The Language of Traditional Architecture. Lambert Academic Publishing, Germany, 2017.

== Sources ==
- Curtis, Edward (2010). "Dar al-Islam community (New Mexico)". Encyclopedia of Muslim-American history. New York: Facts on File. p. 134. ISBN 9781438130408. OCLC 650849872.
- Fathy, Hassan (2008-11-21). "Dar al Islam Abiquiu Program Site". MIT Libraries.
- Goldschmidt, Arthur (1999). Biographical dictionary of modern Egypt. Boulder, CO: L. Rienner. p. 56. ISBN 9781588269850. OCLC 841810840.
- Nobbs-Thiessen, Max (2008) [2006]. Contested representations and the building of modern Egypt : the architecture of Hassan Fathy (MA). Ottawa: Library and Archives Canada = Bibliothèque et Archives Canada. ISBN 9780494294062. OCLC 471036139.
- Roth, Leland (1993). Understanding architecture : its elements, history, and meaning. New York, NY: Icon Editions. ISBN 9780064301589. OCLC 643834100.
- Schleifer, S. Abdullah (1984). "Hassan Fathy's Abiquiu: An Experimental Islamic Educational Center in Rural New Mexico". Ekistics. 51 (304): 56–60. ISSN 0013-2942. JSTOR 43620415. OCLC 5987894730.
- Steele, James (1997). An architecture for people : the complete works of Hassan Fathy. New York: Whitney Library of Design. ISBN 9780823002269. OCLC 9159872006.
- Stegers, Rudolf (2008). "Dar Al Islam Mosque". Sacred buildings : a design manual. Basel; Boston: Birkhäuser. pp. 210–211. doi:10.1007/978-3-7643-8276-6_63. ISBN 9783764382766.
