= Qurnah District =

Administrative district in Luxor Governorate, Egypt

Qurnah District مركز القرنة
- Markaz
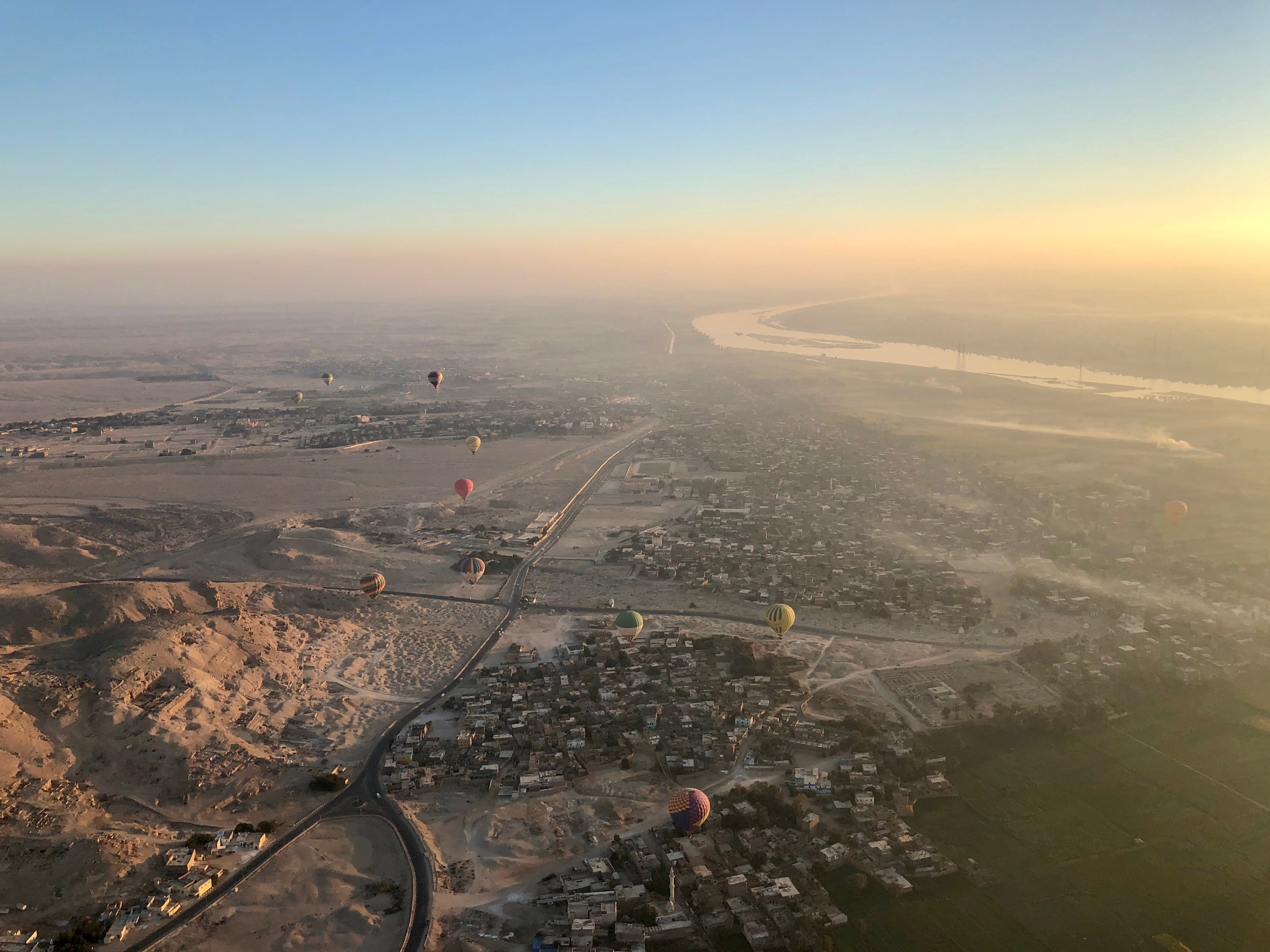
- Aerial view of the district

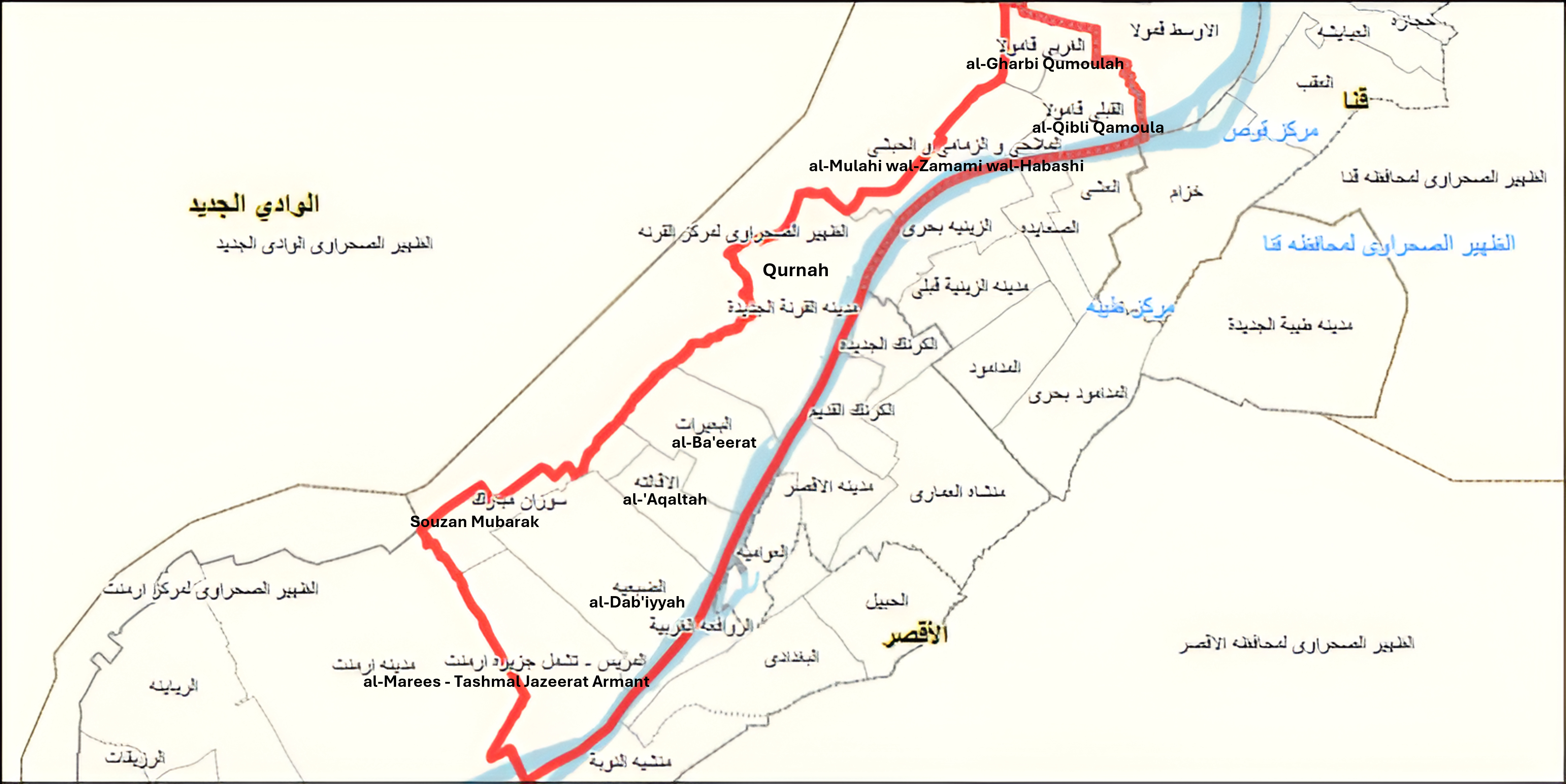
- Administrative map of the district
- Interactive map of Qurnah District
- Location in Egypt
- Coordinates: 25.709767°N 32.615846°E
- Country: Egypt
- Governorate: Luxor Governorate
- Established: 2006
- Capital: Qurnah

Area
  - Total: 104.9 km^{2} (40.5 sq mi)

Population (2023)
  - Total: 181,237
  - Density: 1,728/km^{2} (4,475/sq mi)

The Qurnah District (Arabic: مركز القرنة, Markaz al-Qurnah) is a markaz (district) located in the southern part of Egypt, within the Luxor Governorate.

The district is centered on the town of Qurnah. In addition to the town itself, it includes the rural areas of al-Gharbi Qamoula (الغربي قامولا), al-Qibli Qamoula (القبلي قامولا), al-Ba'eerat (البعيرات), al-'Aqaltah (الاقالته), al-Dab'iyyah (الضبعيه), Souzan Mubarak (سوزان مبارك), al-Mulahi (الملاحه), and Sheikh Amer (الشيخ عامر). The district's territory corresponds broadly to the entire west bank of the Nile opposite the city of Luxor. It therefore encompasses the whole of the Theban Necropolis, including the Valley of the Kings and the mortuary temples of the pharaohs of the New Kingdom of Egypt.
