= Dar al-Islam (organization) =

Muslim educational center in US

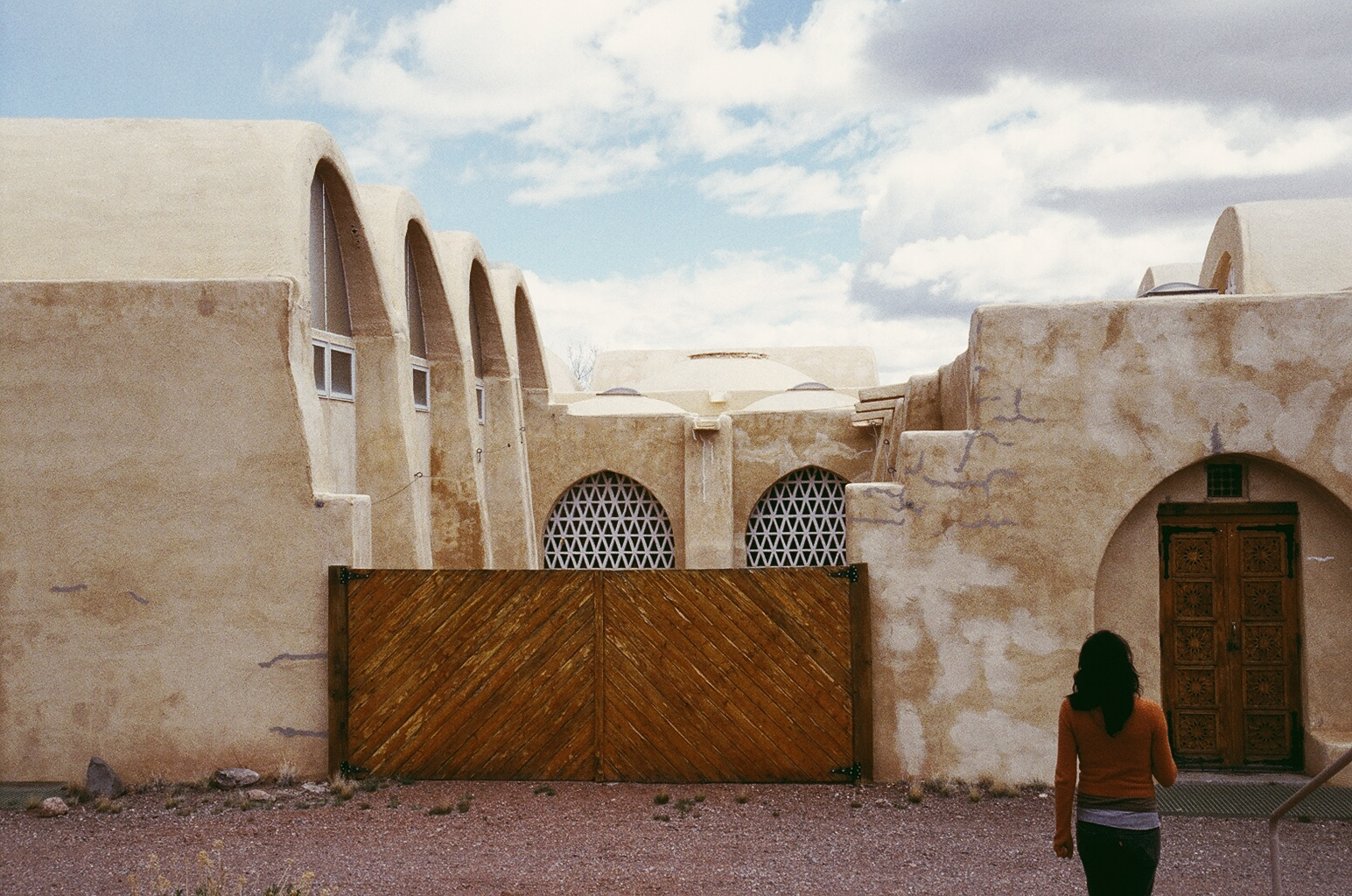
- Established: 1979 (47 years ago)
- Types: mosque, madrasa
- Country: United States

Dar al-Islam is a Muslim educational center located near Abiquiú, New Mexico, US.

== History ==
Dar al-Islam was the first planned Islamic community in the United States. It was originally co-founded in 1979 by Nuridin Durkee, an American who had converted to Islam; Sahl Kabbani, a Saudi businessman; and Abdullah Omar Nasseef, a former secretary-general of the World Muslim League. Kabbani reportedly contributed $125,000 to the non-profit Lama Foundation that was formed to create the community, while the bulk of the start up funds were said to have come from the Riyadh Ladies’ Benevolent Association of Saudi Arabia, and several daughters of the late Khalid bin Abdulaziz Al Saud.

The foundation purchased its first 1,000-acre (4.0 km^{2}) site from Alva Simpson, a well-established rancher along the Chama, for $1,372,000. The land included the 400-acre (1.6 km^{2}) mesa top, plus 600 acres (2.4 km^{2}) below the mesa – a lush, fertile tract along the Chama River.

At its height, the community served some 60 students, employed seven full-time teachers, and partially supported itself through resident entrepreneurial efforts. By 1990, however, the project was suffering from attrition. Although it never fully achieved its original intent as a residential community for American Muslims, it did succeed in remaining viable as an educational facility. Today it provides religious instruction, retreats and camps for its residents and other Muslims, as well as teaching workshops on Islam for public and private institutions.

== Architecture ==
The mosque and madrasa (religious school) were designed by the Egyptian architect Hassan Fathy and were constructed of adobe by construction workers who were American born converts of Islam who wished to live at the foundation. Some of these workers were affiliated with Sheikh Nazim Adil. The main buildings were completed in 1981, and Dar al-Islam opened in 1982.

== Sources ==
- Barakat, Heba (2014). The Dar al Islam Mosque and complex, Abiquiu, New Mexico : mosques of the United States of America. Kuala Lumpur, Malaysia: Islamic Arts Museum Malaysia. ISBN 9789832591078. OCLC 921930832.
- Chidester, Dianne Lynn (1999). "My Two Weeks at Mosque Camp: A Report on Dar al Islam in Abiquiu, New Mexico". Teaching Anthropology: Society for Anthropology in Community Colleges Notes. 6 (1). Wiley: 27–33. doi:10.1525/tea.1999.6.1.27. ISSN 1537-1751.
- Curtis, Edward (2010). "Dar al-Islam community (New Mexico)". Encyclopedia of Muslim-American history. New York: Facts on File. p. 134. ISBN 9781438130408. OCLC 650849872.
- Fathy, Hassan (November 21, 2008). "Dar al Islam Abiquiu Program Site". MIT Libraries.
- Kahera, Akel (2002). Deconstructing the American mosque : space, gender, and aesthetics. Austin: University of Texas Press. pp. 17–18, 81–87. ISBN 9780292798366. OCLC 55889932.
- Kahera, Akel Ismail (August 12, 2013). "Muslim Spaces and Mosque Architecture". The Cambridge Companion to American Islam. Cambridge University Press. pp. 228–245. doi:10.1017/cco9781139026161.016. ISBN 9781139026161. OCLC 855793779.
- Niebuhr, Gustav (May 5, 1996). "Community Of Muslims Finds Desert Fertile Land". The New York Times.
- Rayburn, Rosalie (June 3, 2016). "New Mexico's tiny Islamic community spreads a message of inclusion, calm to neighbors". Albuquerque Journal.
- Schleifer, S. Abdullah (1984). "Hassan Fathy's Abiquiu: An Experimental Islamic Educational Center in Rural New Mexico". Ekistics. 51 (304): 56–60. ISSN 0013-2942. JSTOR 43620415. OCLC 5987894730.
- Stegers, Rudolf (2008). "Dar Al Islam Mosque". Sacred buildings : a design manual. Basel; Boston: Birkhäuser. pp. 210–211. doi:10.1007/978-3-7643-8276-6_63. ISBN 9783764382766.
- Tracy, William (May–June 1988). "Dar al Islam: The Code and the Calling". Saudi Aramco World. pp. 20–29. ISSN 1530-5821. OCLC 50987463.
