= 2010 World Monuments Watch =

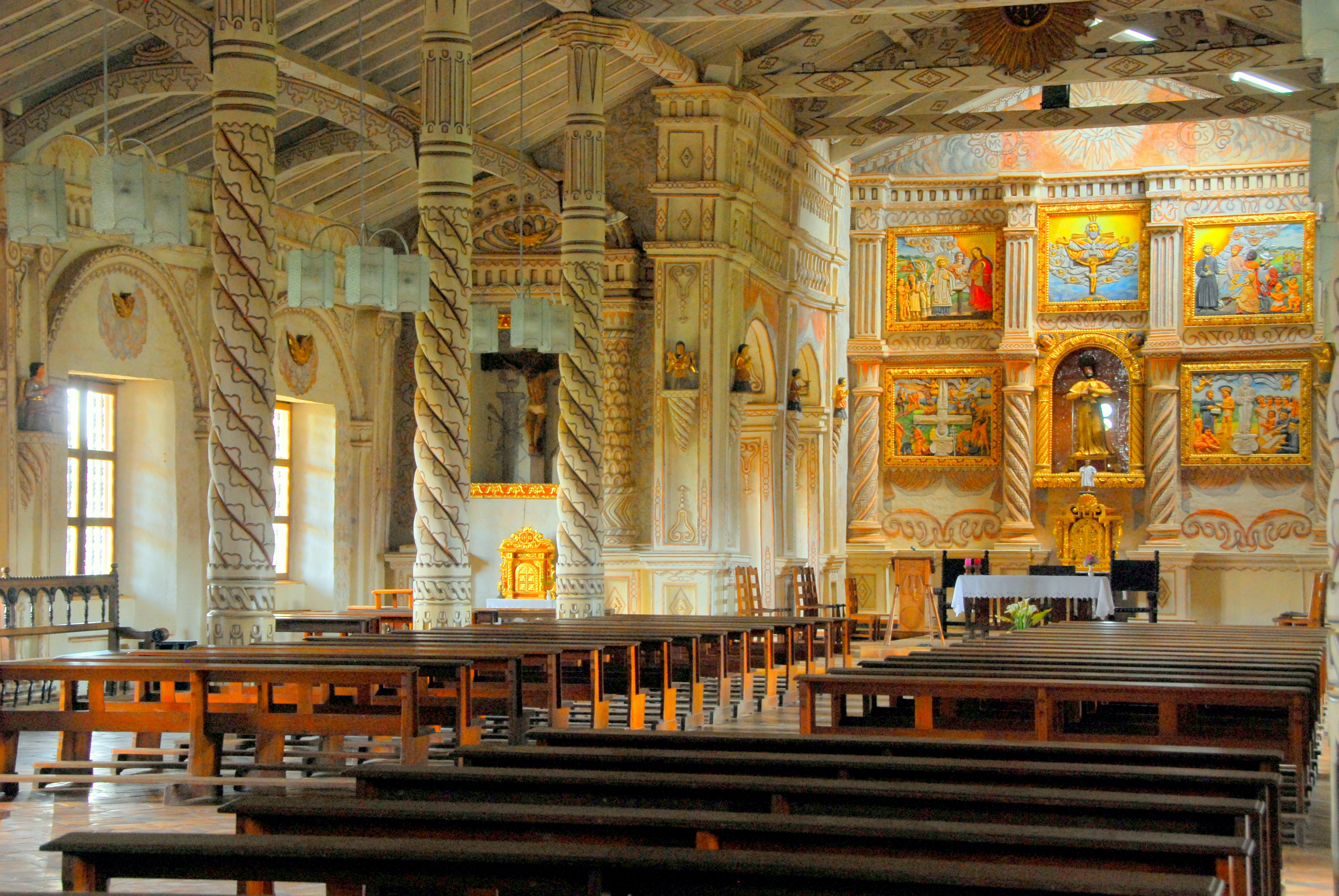
Interior of the church in San Javier, Bolivia. With the expulsion of the Jesuit order in the mid-18th century most reductions were abandoned. The Jesuit Missions of the Chiquitos are unique in that the settlements have survived largely intact.

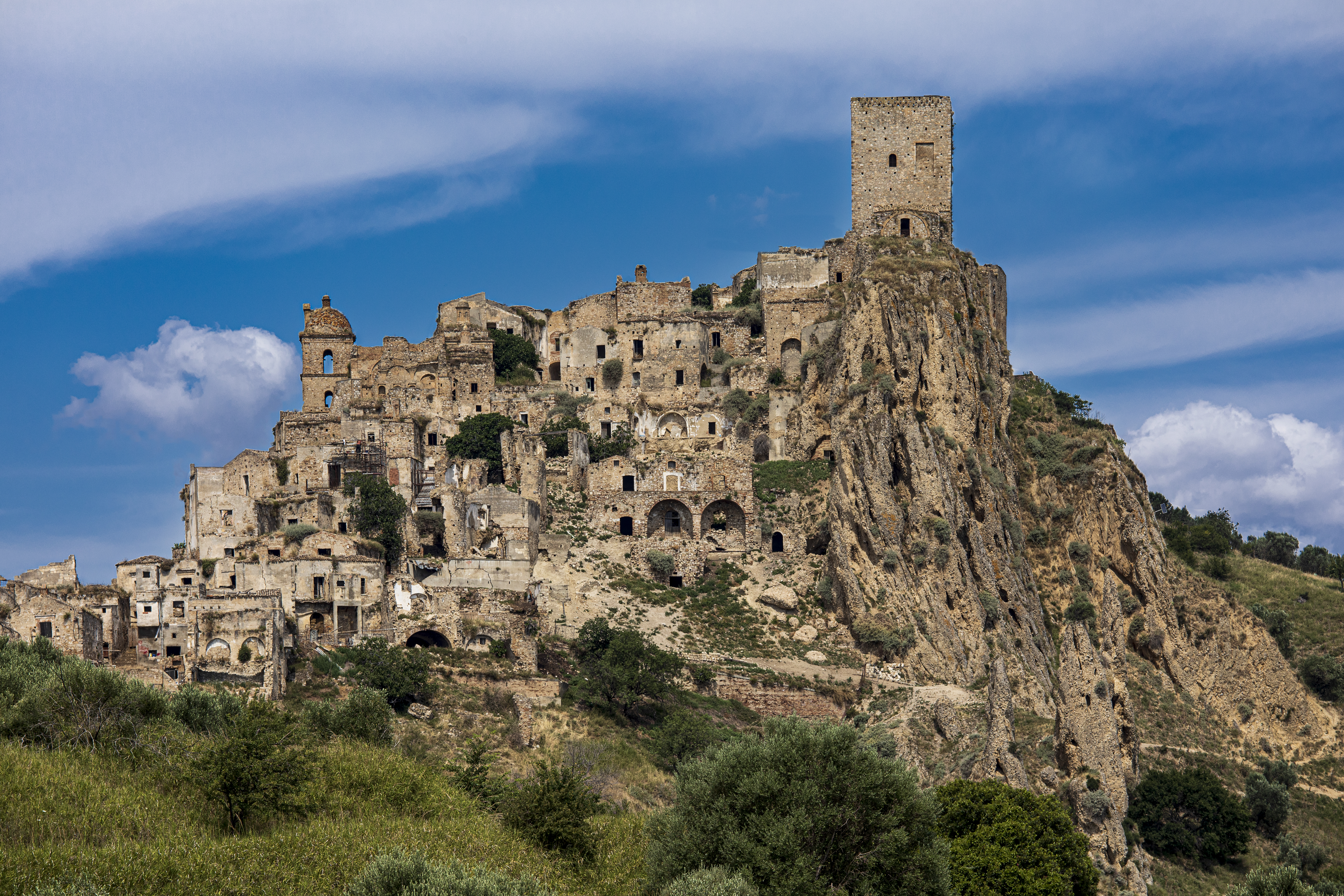
The Norman tower in Craco, Italy was erected in 1000 AD. The village was severely damaged by earthquakes between 1959 and 1972 and rendered uninhabitable by a series of landslides. It has been uninhabited since 1963.

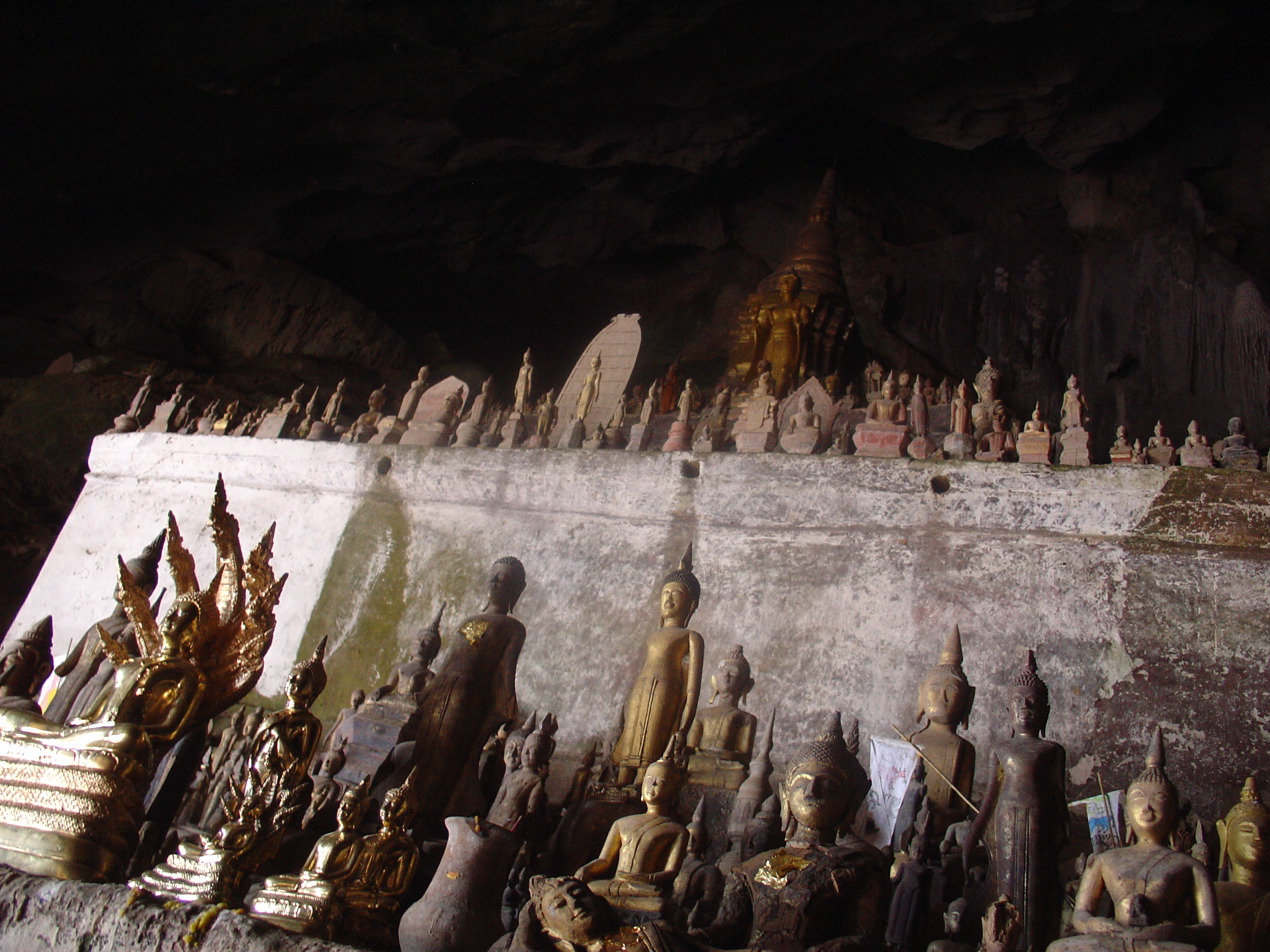
Tham Ting in Laos contains approximately 2,500 mostly wooden Buddha laid out over the floors and wall shelves. They take many different positions, including meditation, teaching, peace, rain, and reclining (nirvana).

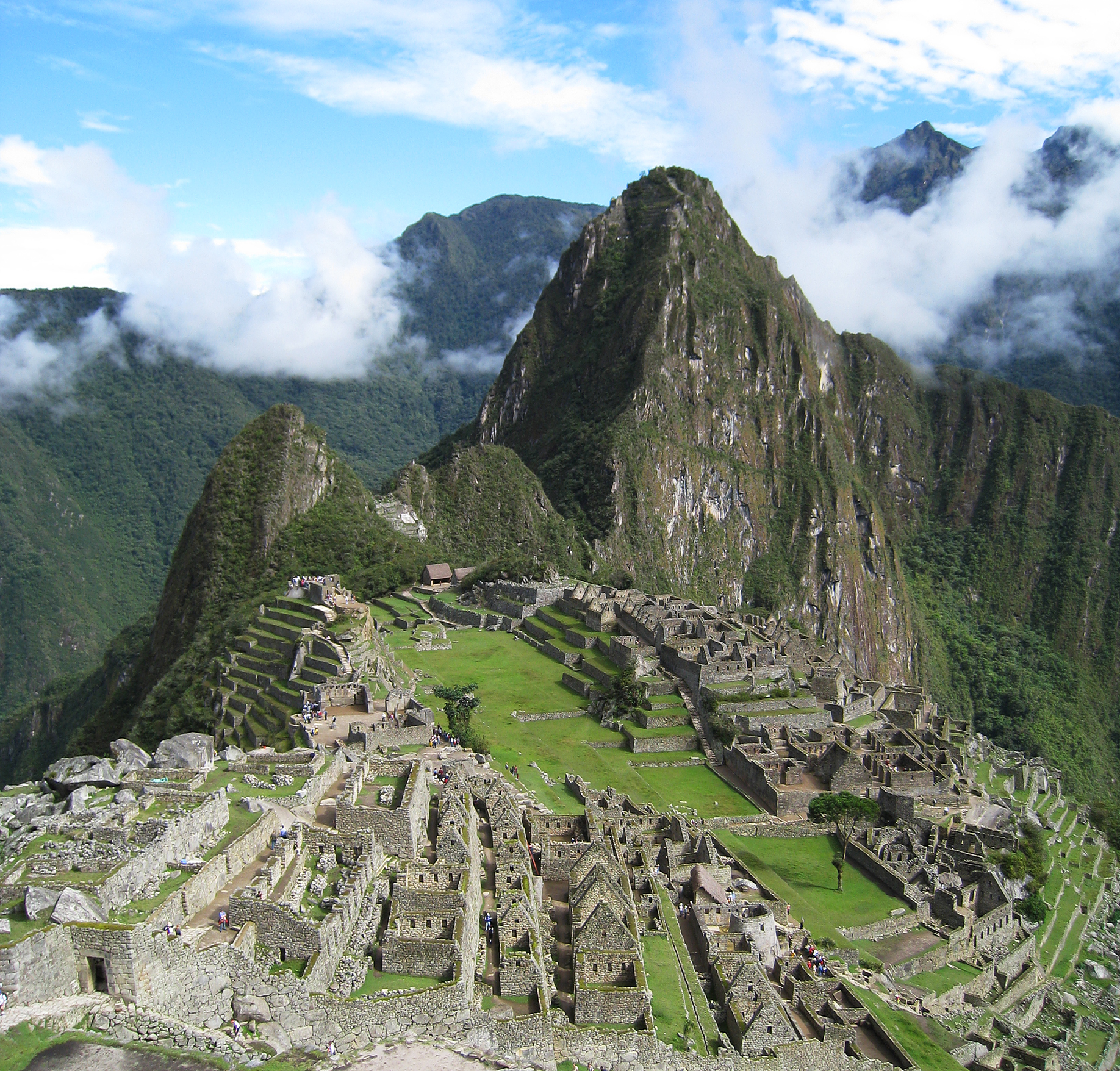
Machu Picchu is one of the eight sites from Peru to be included on the 2010 Watch List.

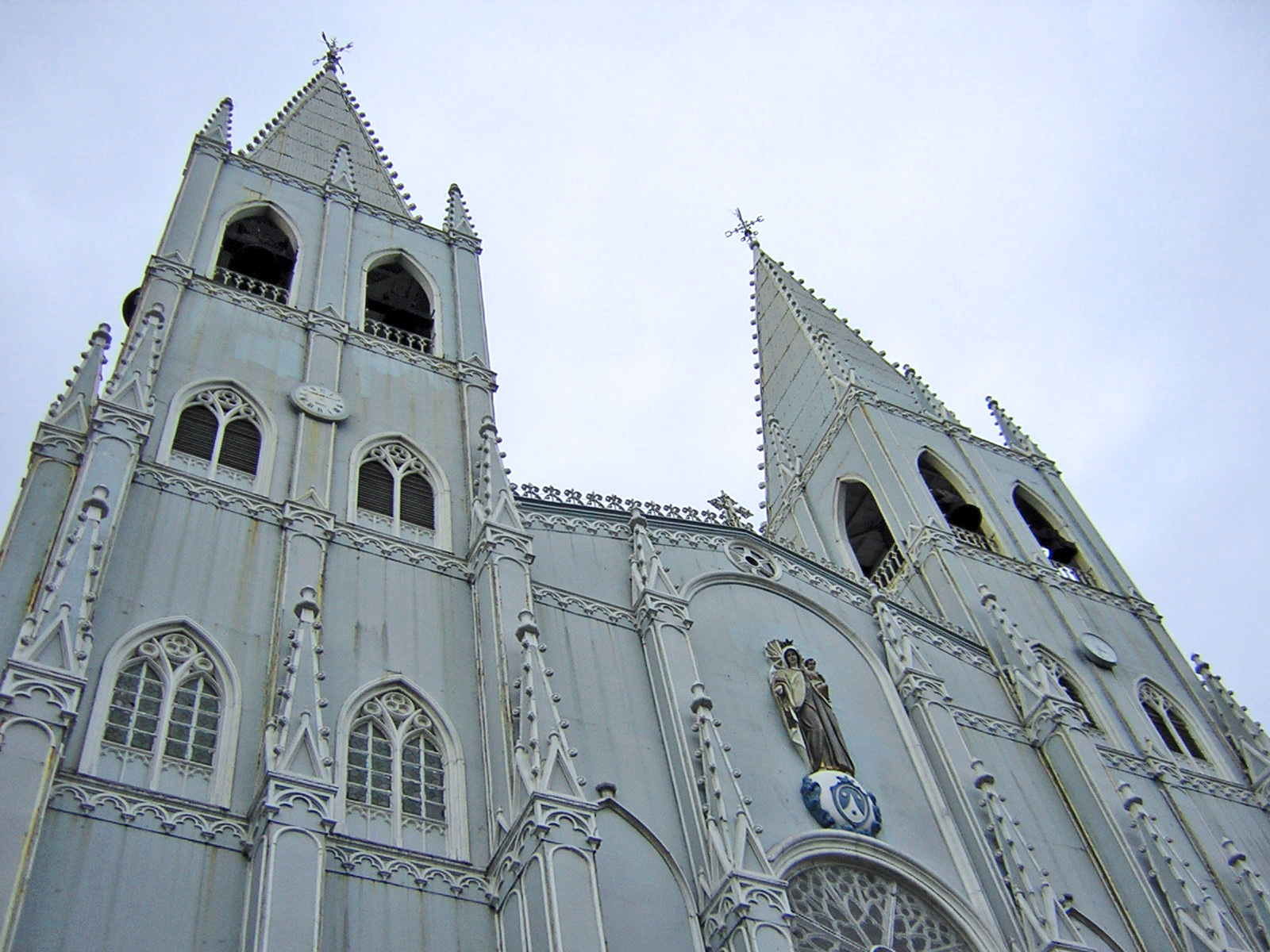
San Sebastian Church in Manila, the Philippines is claimed as the only prefabricated steel church in the world. Completed in 1891 in recent years it has been beset by rust and corrosion. It was listed in the 1998 World Monuments Watch List of Most Endangered Sites.

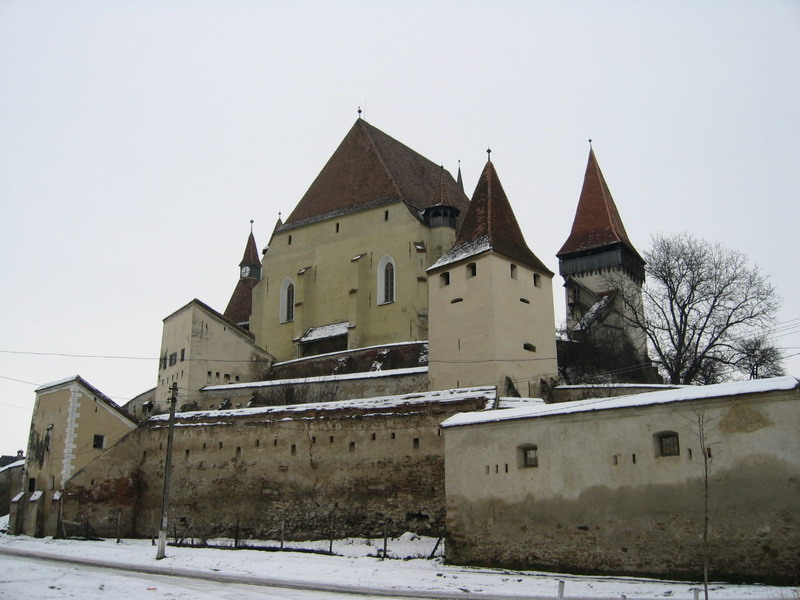
Biertan, Romania. 13th Century Saxon villages in Transylvania were constantly under the threat of Ottoman and Tatar invasions and built fortifications centred around their churches.

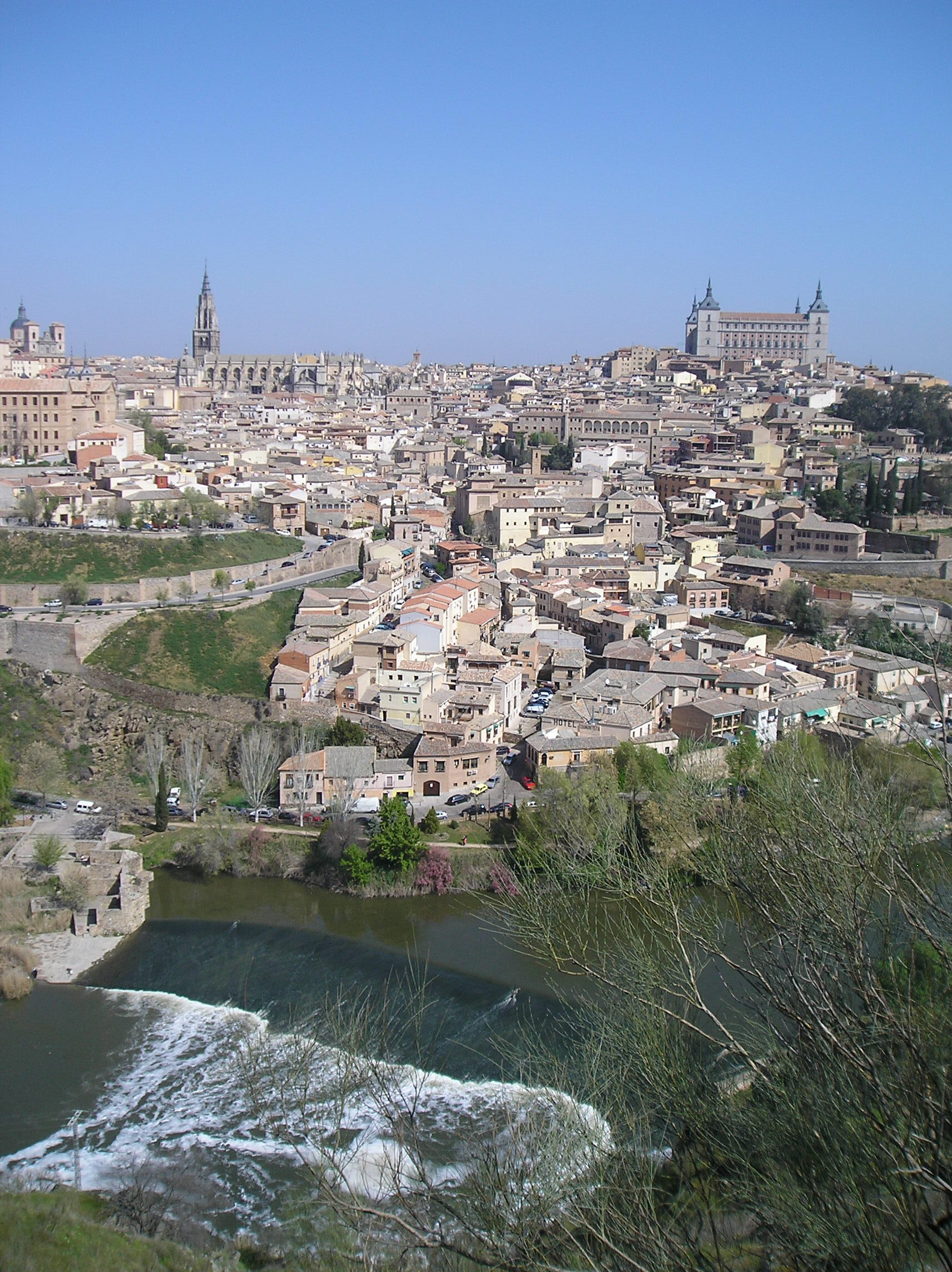
The Old City of Toledo, Spain is surrounded on three sides by the Tagus River and contains many historical sites, including the Alcázar (castle), Primate Cathedral, and the Zocodover, a central market place. It is one of six sites in Spain listed on the 2010 Watch List.

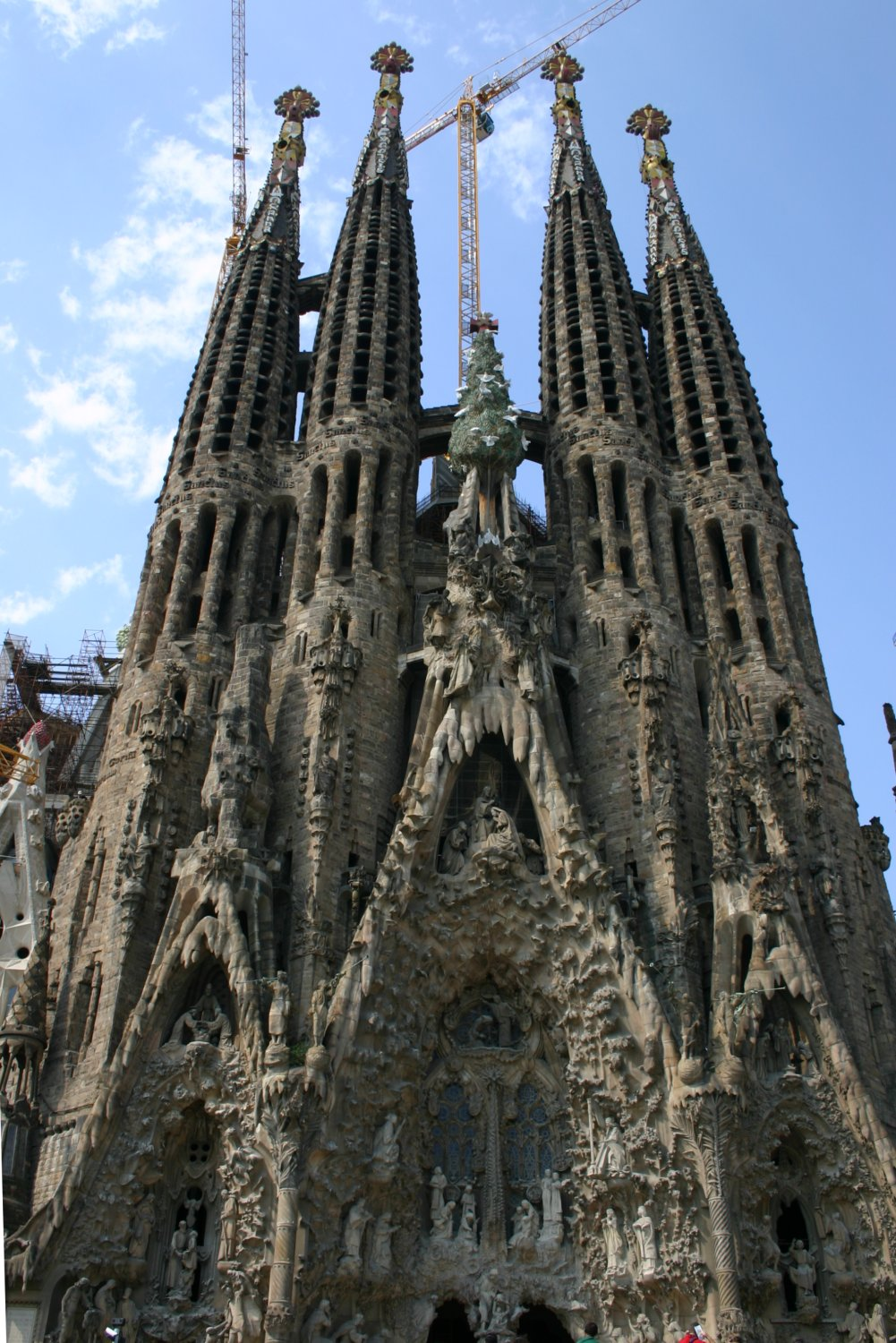
The Sagrada Família is a massive Roman Catholic church that has been under construction in Barcelona, Catalonia, Spain since 1882 and is not expected to be complete until at least 2026. It is considered the master-work of renowned Catalan architect Antoni Gaudí (1852–1926).

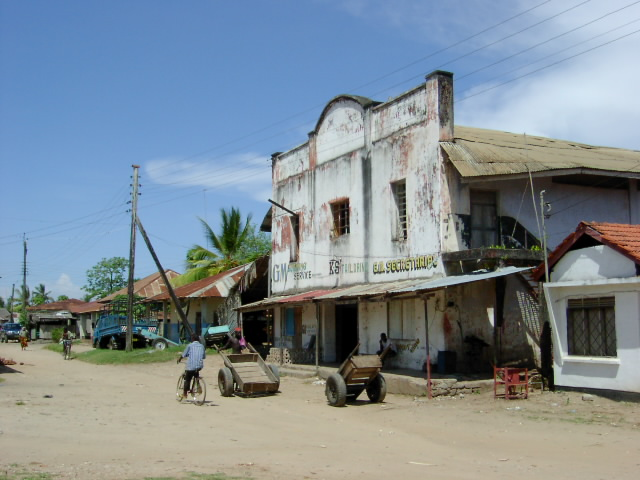
Pangani, Tanzania came to prominence in the 19th century, when under Zanzibari rule it was a major terminus of caravan routes to the deep interior. After the sultan of Zanzibar signed treaties with Great Britain outlawing the ocean-going trade in slaves in 1873, it became a centre for smuggling slaves across the narrow channel to Pemba.

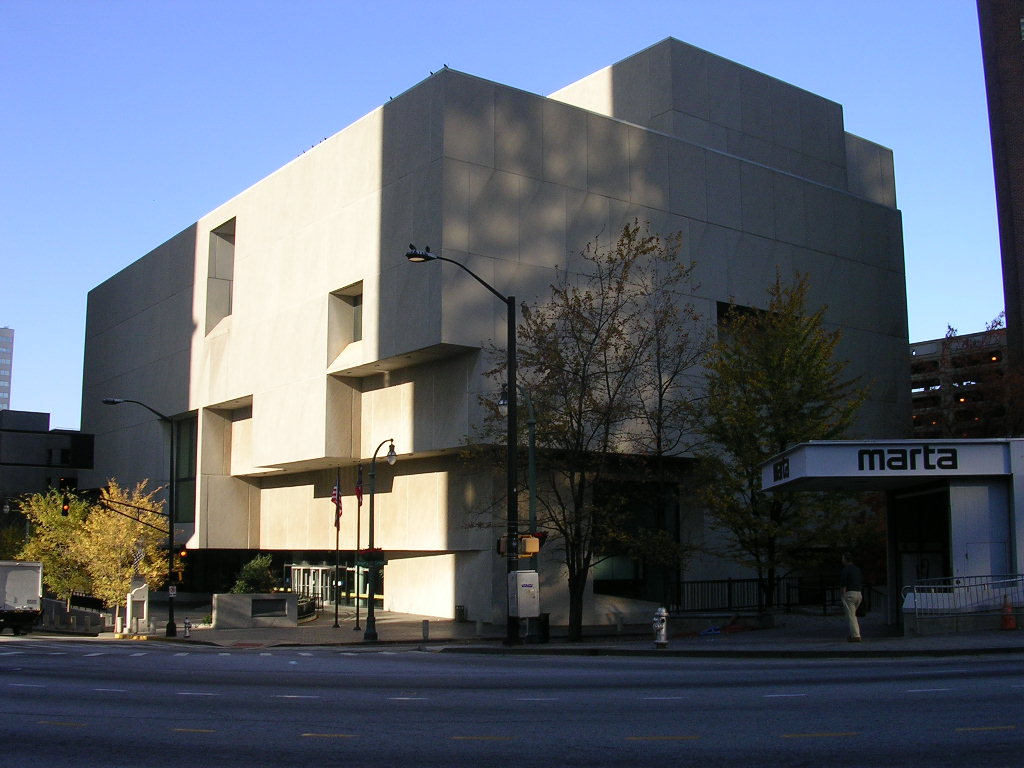
The newest site on the list, completed in 1980, the Atlanta Central Library was designed by Marcel Breuer in a modernist and brutalist style. The building is considered a masterpiece by architectural experts, such as Barry Bergdoll, the Chief Architectural Curator of the Museum of Modern Art.

The World Monuments Watch is a flagship advocacy program of the New York–based private non-profit organization World Monuments Fund (WMF) that calls international attention to cultural heritage around the world that is threatened by neglect, vandalism, conflict, or disaster.

== Selection process ==
Every two years, it publishes a select list known as the Watch List of Endangered Sites that are in urgent need of preservation funding and protection. The sites are nominated by governments, conservation professionals, site caretakers, non-government organizations (NGOs), concerned individuals, and others working in the field. An independent panel of international experts then select 100 candidates from these entries to be part of the Watch List, based on the significance of the sites, the urgency of the threat, and the viability of both advocacy and conservation solutions.

For the succeeding two-year period until a new Watch List is published, these 100 sites can qualify for grants and funds from the WMF, as well as from other foundations, private donors, and corporations by capitalizing on the publicity and attention gained from the inclusion on the Watch List.

== 2010 Watch List ==
The 2010 World Monuments Watch List of Endangered Sites was announced on October 6, 2009 by WMF President Bonnie Burnham. The 2010 Watch List highlights the need to create a balance between heritage concerns and the social, economic, and environmental interests of communities around the world.

The sites on the 2010 Watch list make a dramatic case for the need to bring together a variety of sectors—economic, environmental, heritage preservation, and social—when we are making plans that will affect us all. Greater cooperation among these sectors would benefit humanity today, while ensuring our place as stewards of the Earth for the next generation.

— launch of 2010 Watch List, Bonnie Burnham, WMF president

=== List by country/territory ===
Number^{[A]}	Country/Territory	Site^{[B]}	Location^{[C]}	Period^{[C]}
1	Afghanistan	Herat Old City	Herat	ca. BC 5000–Present
2	Argentina	Buenos Aires Historic Center	Buenos Aires	1750–1830
3	Argentina	Teatro Colón	Buenos Aires	1885–1908
4	Armenia	Aghjots Vank	Garni	13th Century
5	Austria	Wiener Werkbundsiedlung	Vienna	1920s–1930s
6	Bahrain	Suq al-Qaysariya	Muharraq	ca. 1800
7	Belgium	Sanatorium Joseph Lemaire	Overijse	1937–1987
8	Bhutan	Phajoding Temple Complex	Thimphu	1224
9	Bolivia	Convento-Museo Santa Teresa	Cochabamba	1760
10	Bolivia	Jesuit Missions of the Chiquitos	Santa Cruz	17th–18th Centuries
11	Chile	Churches of Arica Parinacota	Arica and Parinacota Region	16th Century
12	Colombia	San Fernando and San José Fortresses	Cartagena de Indias	18th Century
13	Colombia	Santa Fe de Antioquia Old City	Antioquia Department	16th–18th Centuries
14	Comoros	Ujumbe Palace	Mutsamudu	1786
15	Ecuador	Todos Santos complex	Cuenca	13th Century
16	Egypt	New Gourna	Kurna	1945
17	Egypt	Old Mosque of Shali Fortress	Siwa Oasis	1203
18	France	Saint-Martin-des-Puits Church	Saint-Martin-des-Puits	9th–17th Centuries
19	France	Hôtel de Monnaies	Villemagne-l'Argentière	13th Century
20	Greece	Churches of Lesvos	Lesbos	3rd–16th Centuries
21	Guatemala	Kaminaljuyu	Guatemala City	8th Century BC
22	Haiti	Gingerbread Houses	Port-au-Prince	1749–1925
23	India	Chiktan Castle	Kargil	16th century
24	India	Dechen Namgyal Monastery	Nyoma	17th century
25	India	Historic Civic Centre of Shimla	Shimla	1830s
26	India	Kothi, Qila Mahmudabad	Mahmudabad	1677
27	Iraq	Al-Hadba’ Minaret	Mosul	1172
28	Ireland	Russborough House	Blessington	1740s
29	Israel	Cathedral of St. James	Old City of Jerusalem	12th century
30	Israel	Old City of Lod	Lod	1260–1917
31	Italy	Historic Center of Craco	Craco	1000
32	Italy	Ponte Lucano	Italy	1st Century BC
33	Italy	Villa of San Gilio	Oppido Lucano	1st Century BC
34	Japan	Machiya Townhouses	Kyoto	1603–1867
35	Jordan	Damiya Dolmen Field	Damiya, Jordan Valley	BC 3600–3000
36	Kazakhstan	Vernacular Architecrure of the Kazakh Steppe Sary-Arka	Zhezkazgan	18th–20th Centuries
37	Laos	Hintang Archaeological Landscape	Houaphanh Province	Bronze Age
38	Laos	Tham Ting	Nam Kong River at Ban Pak Ou	15th Century
39	Mexico	Aqueduct of Padre Tembleque	Zempoala to Otumba	1543–1560
40	Mexico	Las Pozas	Xilitla	1944
41	Mexico	Church of San Bartolo Soyaltepec	Oaxaca	1723
42	Mexico	Church of San Felipe Tindaco	Tlaxiaco	ca. 1800
43	Mexico	Santos Reyes Church and Monastery and La Comunidad Convent	Metztitlán	1570
44	Moldova	Assumption of Our Lady Church	Causeni	17th Century
45	Morocco	Lixus	Larache	12th century BC–7th Century AD
46	Pakistan	Petroglyphs in the Diamer-Bhasha Dam Area	Northern Areas	ca. 10000–1000 BC
47	Pakistan	Shikarpoor Historic City Center	Shikarpoor	1617-1947
48	Panama	Corozal Cemetery	Panama City	1914
49	Panama	Historic Center of Colón	Colón	19th Century
50	Panama	Mount Hope Cemetery	Colón	1850
51	Paraguay	Santísima Trinidad del Paraná	Trinidad	1706
52	Peru	Chankillo	Casma Valley	4th century BC
53	Peru	Jesuit Churches of San José and San Javier	Changuillo and El Ingenio	1740s
54	Peru	Pachacamac Sanctuary	Lurín	5th Century
55	Peru	Pikillaqta Archaeological Park	Cuzco	500–1200
56	Peru	San Francisco de Asis	Marcapata	ca. 1700
57	Peru	Machu Picchu	Urubamba Valley	15th Century
58	Peru	Tambo Colorado	Humay	1470–1532
59	Peru	Church of Santa Cruz of Jerusalem	Juli	16th Century
60	Philippines	Nuestra Señora de la Asunción	Santa Maria	1765
61	Philippines	Rice Terraces of the Philippine Cordilleras	Ifugao	16th Century
62	Philippines	San Sebastian Basilica	Manila	1891
63	Romania	Fortified Churches of Southern Transylvania	Around Sibiu	12th–14th Centuries
64	Russia	Church of the Icon of the Mother of God of the Sign	Podolsk	1704
65	Slovakia	Lietava Castle	Lietava	13th Century
66	South Africa	Wonderwerk Cave	Kuruman	Stone Age
67	Spain	Historic Landscape of Sevilla	Seville	8th–18th Centuries
68	Spain	Historic Landscape of Toledo (Upper and Lower Valleys of the River Tagus)	Toledo	Paleolithic Era–Present
69	Spain	Numantia	Soria	2nd Century BC
70	Spain	Old Town of Ávila	Ávila	1090
71	Spain	Route of Santiago de Compostela	Aragon, Navarre, La Rioja, Castile-Leon and Galicia	Middle Ages
72	Spain	Temple Expiatori de la Sagrada Família	Barcelona	1882–Present
73	Sri Lanka	Dutch Fort of Batticaloa	Batticaloa	1628
74	Tanzania	Pangani Historic Town	Pangani	ca. 1800
75	Uganda	Wamala King's Tombs	Nansana	
76	United Kingdom	Carlisle Memorial Methodist Church	Belfast	1875
77	United Kingdom	Edinburgh Historic Graveyards	Edinburgh	17th–19th Centuries
78	United Kingdom	Sheerness Dockyard	Sheerness	1815
79	United Kingdom	St John the Evangelist Parish Church	Shobdon	12th Century; Extended 1755–58
80	United Kingdom	Tecton Buildings	Dudley Zoological Gardens	1937
81	United States	Atlanta-Fulton Central Public Library	Atlanta	1980
82	United States	Commodore Ralph Middleton Munroe Miami Marine Stadium	Miami	1963
83	United States	Cultural Landscape of Hadley, Massachusetts	Hadley	1660s-present
84	United States	Phillis Wheatley Elementary School	New Orleans	1954
85	United States	St. Louis Cemetery No. 2	New Orleans	1823
86	United States	Taliesin	Spring Green	1911
87	United States	Taliesin West	Scottsdale	1937
88	United States	Taos Pueblo	New Mexico	ca. 1000–1450
89	United States	Bridges of the Merritt Parkway	Fairfield County, Connecticut	1940
90	Uzbekistan	Desert Castles of Ancient Khorezm	Karakalpakstan, Elli-Kala District & Beruni District, Uzbekistan	7th Century BC
91	Venezuela	Faculty of Architecture and Urbanism, Central University of Venezuela	Caracas	1950s
92	Venezuela	Parque del Este	Caracas	1958

== Statistics by country/territory ==
The following countries/territories have multiple sites entered on the 2010 Watch List, listed by the number of sites:

Number of sites	Country/Territory
9	United States of America
8	Peru
6	Spain
5	Mexico and United Kingdom
4	India
3	Italy, Panama and the Philippines
2	Argentina, Bolivia, Colombia, Egypt, France, Israel, Laos, Pakistan and Venezuela

== Notes ==
A. Numbers list only meant as a guide on this article. No official reference numbers have been designated for the sites on the Watch List.
B. Names and spellings used for the sites were based on the official 2010 Watch List as published.
C. The references to the sites' locations and periods of construction were based on the official 2010 Watch List as published.
