= Pak Ou Caves =

Caves in Laos

Coordinates: 20.0487°N 102.2105°E

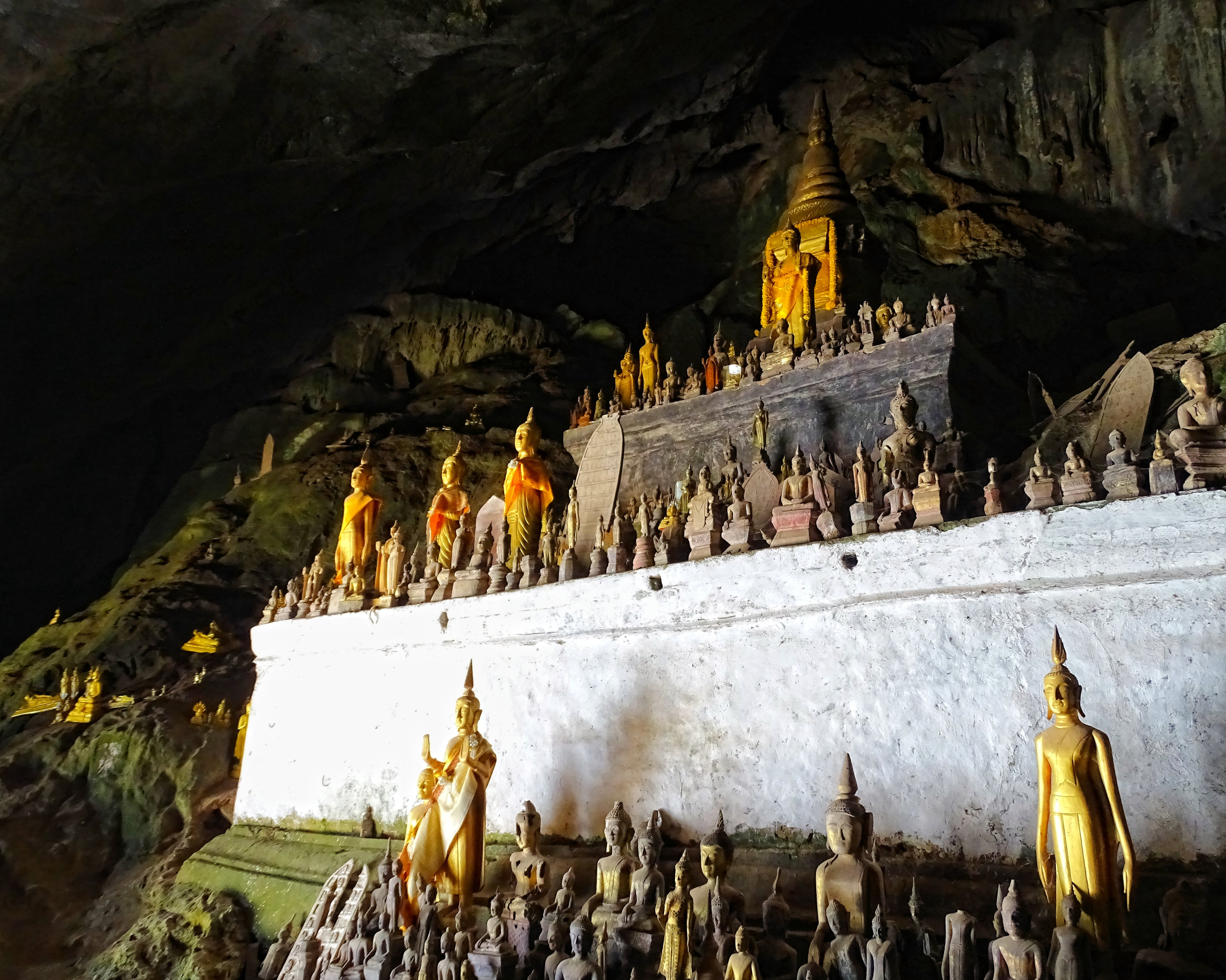
Buddha statues inside the lower cave

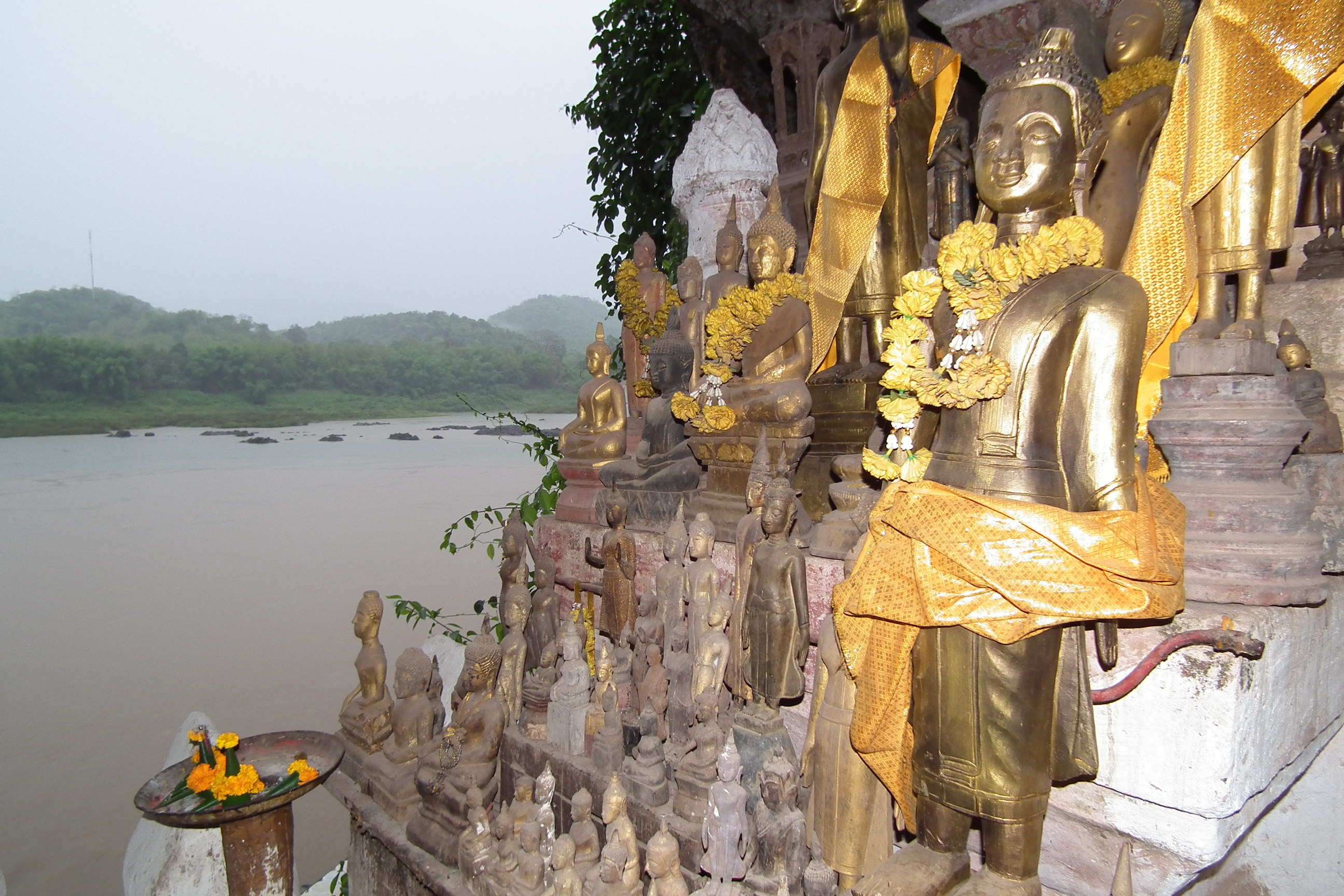
Steps to the lower cave from Nam Ou river / Mekong river.

Near Pak Ou (mouth of the Ou river) the Tham Ting (lower cave) and the Tham Theung (upper cave) are two caves overlooking the Mekong River from the west side, 25 km to the north (about two hours upstream) of Luang Prabang, Laos. They are frequently visited by tourists.

The caves are noted for their miniature Buddha sculptures. Hundreds of very small and mostly damaged wooden Buddhist figures are laid out over the wall shelves. They take many different positions, including meditation, teaching, walking, naga, peace, rain, and reclining (Nibbana).
