= Luxor Governorate =

Governorate of Egypt

- Governorate
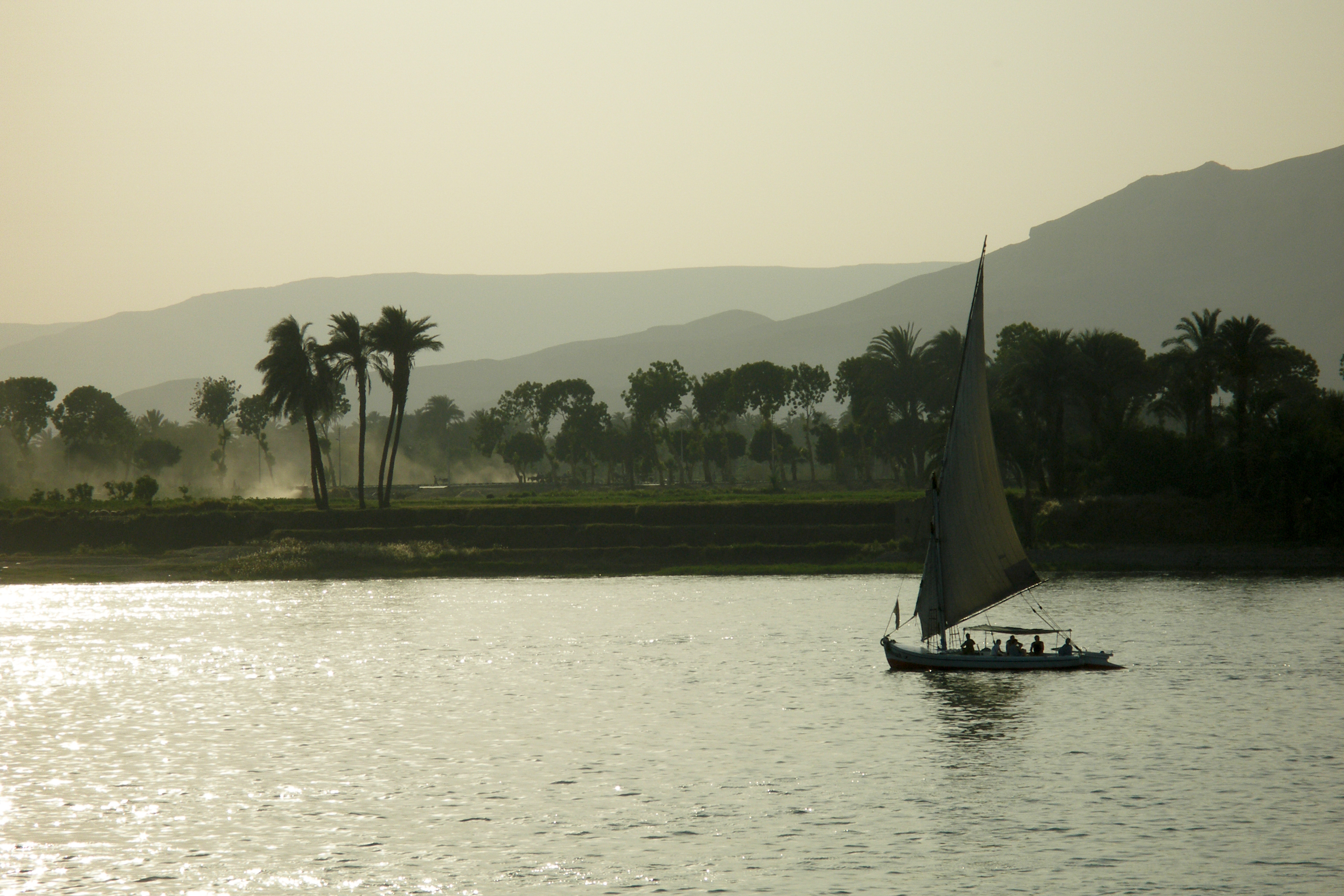

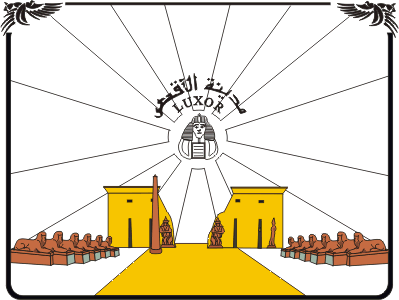
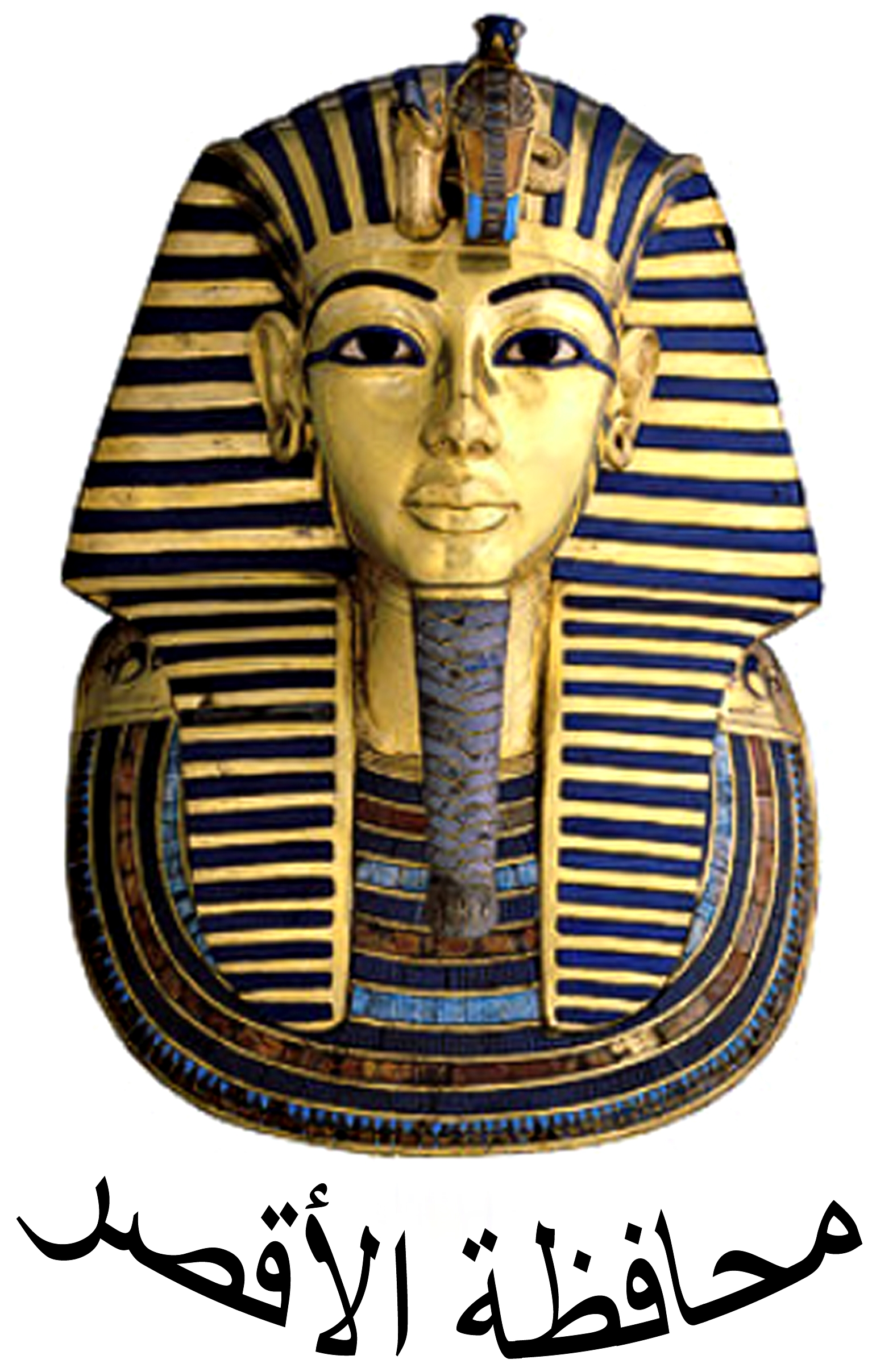
- Flag

- Luxor Governorate on the map of Egypt
- Coordinates: 25°41′N 32°39′E
- Country: Egypt
- Seat: Luxor (capital)

Government
  - Governor: Abdel Moteleb Emara

Area
  - Total: 2,409.68 km^{2} (930.38 sq mi)

Population (January 2024)
  - Total: 1,429,281
  - Density: 593.141/km^{2} (1,536.23/sq mi)

GDP
  - Total: EGP 47 billion (US$ 3.0 billion)
- Time zone: UTC+2 (EGY)
  - Summer (DST): UTC+3 (EEST)
- HDI (2021): 0.708 high · 17th
- Website: www.luxor.gov.eg

Luxor (Arabic: محافظة الأقصر) has been one of Egypt's governorates since 7 December 2009, when former president Hosni Mubarak announced its separation from the Qena Governorate. It is located 635 km south of Cairo. It lies in Upper Egypt along the Nile. Luxor is the capital of the Luxor governorate, other important cities and tourist centers include Esna and Armant.

== Overview ==
Despite the governorate being one of the top destinations for tourists in Egypt, the poverty rate is more than 60% in this governorate but recently some social safety networks have been provided in the form of financial assistance and job opportunities. The funding has been coordinated by the country's Ministry of Finance and with assistance from international organizations.

== Municipal divisions ==
The governorate is divided into the following municipal divisions with a total estimated population as of January 2023 of 1,388,666. In some instances, there is a markaz and a kism with the same name.

Municipal Divisions
Anglicized name	Native name	Arabic transliteration	Population (January 2023 Est.)	Type
Qurnah	مركز القرنه	Al-Qarnah	180,120	Markaz
Luxor	قسم الأقصر	Al-Uqṣur	280,525	Kism (fully urban)
Luxor	مركز الأقصر	Al-Uqṣur	182,158	Markaz
Armant	مركز أرمنت	Armant	193,337	Markaz
Esna	مركز إسنا	Isnā	472,175	Markaz
Thebes (Tiba)	مركز طيبة	Ṭībah	80,351	Markaz

== Emblem ==
The emblem of Luxor represents the bust of Tutankhamun on board an Ancient Egyptian canoe boat, cruising in the Nile, with an obelisk and the sunlight in the background.

== Geography ==
The governorate's total area is 2,960 km^{2}, representing 0.24% of the country's area.

== Population ==
At the 2012 census, the population of the area which in 2024 was formed into the new Luxor Governorate was 1,429,281 people. 47.4% of them lived in urban areas, while 52.6% lived in rural areas. The annual population growth rate is 18.2 per thousand.

== Industrial zones ==
According to the Governing Authority for Investment and Free Zones (GAFI), the following industrial zones are located in Luxor:

Zone name
El Boghdadi Industrial Zone
