= Visionary environment =

Type of artistic installation

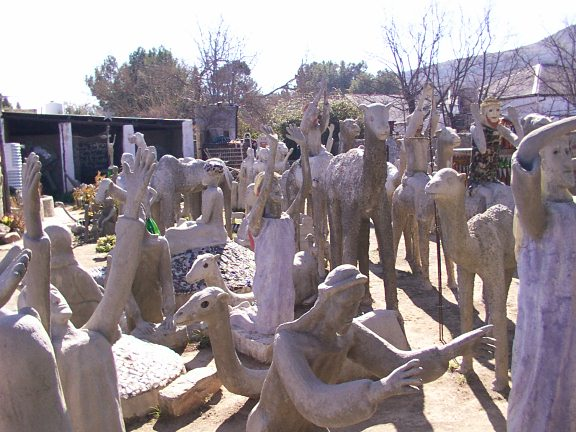
A view of the Camel Yard at The Owl House, a South African visionary environment created by Helen Martins.

A visionary environment or fantasy world is a large artistic installation, often on the scale of a building or sculpture parks, intended to express a vision of its creator. The subjective and personal nature of these projects often implies a marginal status for the artists involved, and there is a strong association between visionary environments and outsider art.

== List of visionary environments ==
- Jim Bishop: Bishop Castle (US)
- Aw Boon Haw (胡文虎) (sponsor/concept): Haw Par Villa (Singapore), Tiger Balm Garden (Hong Kong)
- Johann Michael Bossard: Kunststätte Bossard (Germany)
- Peter Camani: Midlothian Castle (Screaming Heads) (Canada)
- Ferdinand Cheval: Le Palais idéal (France)
- Jean Cocteau: Chapelle Saint-Pierre à Villefranche-sur-Mer, Chapelle Sainte-Blaise des Simples de Milly-la-Forêt (France)
- María Ángeles Fernández Cuesta: Arguedas, Navarre environment (Spain)
- Samuel P. Dinsmoor: Garden of Eden (US)
- Lluís Domènech i Montaner: Palau de la Música Catalana (Spain)
- Kevin Duffy: Rectory Garden Centre, Tudor Village (UK) (official site)
- Howard Finster: Paradise Garden (US)
- Tom Every: Forevertron (US)
- Robert Garcet (French Wikipedia article): Tour d'Eben-Ezer (French Wikipedia article) (Belgium)
- Antoni Gaudí: Park Güell, Sagrada Família, Casa Batlló, Casa Milà, Casa Vicens (Spain)
- Randy Gilson: Randyland (US)
- Manfred Gnädinger: The Museum of the German (Spain)
- Annie Hooper: Bible Stories (US)
- Friedensreich Hundertwasser: Hundertwasserhaus (Austria), Quixote Winery (California), Waldspirale, Grüne Zitadelle von Magdeburg (German Wikipedia article) (Germany)
- Raymond Isidore: Maison Picassiette (French Wikipedia article) (France)
- Mollie Jenson: Art Exhibit (US)
- Karl Junker (German Wikipedia article): Junkerhaus (German Wikipedia article) (Germany)
- Sergei Kirillov (С.И.Кириллов): Kirillov's house (Russia)
- Leonard Knight: Salvation Mountain (US)
- George Paul Kornegay, near Brent, Alabama (US)
- Chalermchai Kositpipat (เฉลิมชัย โฆษิตพิพัฒน์): Wat Rong Khun (Thailand)
- Bill Lishman: (Canada)
- Helen Martins: The Owl House (South Africa)
- Jeff D. McKissack: The Orange Show (US)
- John Milkovisch: The Beer Can House (US)
- Đặng Việt Nga: Hằng Nga Guesthouse (Vietnam)
- Mary Nohl Art Environment (US)
- Eddie Owens Martin: Pasaquan (US)
- Pirro Ligorio: Gardens of Bomarzo (Italy)
- Tressa Prisbrey: Bottle Village (US)
- Ron's Place (UK)
- Simon Rodia: Watts Towers (US)
- Nek Chand Saini (नेक चंद सैणी): Rock Garden of Chandigarh (India)
- Niki de Saint Phalle: The Garden of Tarot (Italy)
- Jules Senis: Jardin Rosa Mir (French Wikipedia article) (France)
- Vollis Simpson: Windmill Park (US)
- Bunleua Sulilat (บุญเหลือ สุรีรัตน์): Buddha Park (Laos), Sala Keoku (Thailand)
- Robert Tatin (French Wikipedia article): Musée Robert Tatin (France)
- Kea Tawana: Ark (US)
- Billy Tripp: The Mindfield (US)
- Lek Viriyaphant (เล็ก วิริยะพันธุ์) (sponsor/concept): Sanctuary of Truth, Erawan Museum, Ancient Siam (Thailand)
- Jacques Warminski: L’Hélice terrestre (France) (official site)
- Bruno Weber: Bruno Weber Park (Switzerland)
- Isaiah Zagar: Philadelphia's Magic Gardens (US)
- various artists: The Albany Bulb (US)

== See also ==
- Visionary environments (Wikipedia category listing)
- Saving and Preserving Arts and Cultural Environments
