= Lək =

Lək or Lyak or Lyaki may refer to:

- Lək, Barda, Azerbaijan
- Lək, Samukh, Azerbaijan
- Lək, Ujar, Azerbaijan
- Ləki, Azerbaijan

== See also ==
- Lek (disambiguation)
