= Lek =

Lek or LEK may refer to:

- Lek, the group of usually male animals participating in Lek mating
- Lek mating, of animals
- Albanian lek, currency
- Lek (magazine), Norway
- Lek (pharmaceutical company), now part of Sandoz
- Lek (river), Netherlands
- De Lek, Netherlands fiefdom
- L.E.K. Consulting, firm
- Leung King stop, Hong Kong (by MTR station code)
- Tata Airport, Guinea (by IATA code)
- Lek, เล็ก, a Thai name or nickname, meaning little
  - private nickname of King Bhumibol Adulyadej of Thailand
  - Lek Nana, 1924 – 2010, Thai businessman
  - Lek Viriyaphant, or Khun Lek, 1914 - 2000, Thai businessman

== See also ==
- Lec (disambiguation)
- Leck (disambiguation)
- Lək (disambiguation), places in Azerbaijan
