= Lec =

Lec or LEC may refer to:

== Organisations ==
- Lake Erie College, a college in Painesville, Ohio
- Lancaster Environment Centre, an interdisciplinary centre at Lancaster University, England
- Lao Evangelical Church, a religious body in Laos
- Laredo Entertainment Center, a sports arena in Laredo, Texas, US
- LEC Refrigeration, former British white goods manufacturer now part of Glen Dimplex
  - LEC Refrigeration Racing, British Formula One constructor associated with the company
- Little East Conference, an NCAA Division III collegiate athletic conference based in New England, US
- Living Enrichment Center, a defunct New Thought church in Wilsonville, Oregon, US
- Lonsdale Energy Corp, a centralized heating operation owned by North Vancouver, British Columbia
- LucasArts Entertainment Company, the former videogame division of Lucasfilm

== Places ==
- Lec, former name of the city of Giżycko, Poland
- LEC, Amtrak station code for Lake City (Amtrak station) in Florida, US
- Lyonia Environmental Center, part of a nature reserve in Deltona, Florida

== Science and technology ==
- Light emitting capacitor, an electroluminescent panel
- Light Emitting Ceramic, a particular brand of ceramic discharge metal-halide lamp
- Light-emitting electrochemical cell, a solid-state device that generates light from an electric current
- Line echo cancellation, a method to cancel or suppress echoes in an electrical signal
- Liquid encapsulated Czochralski, a variant of the Czochralski process for growing crystals
- Liver-expressed chemokine, a small chemokine also known as CCL16
- Local exchange carrier, a type of telecommunication service provider
- Lunar Equipment Conveyor, a device used on Apollo program missions to ferry equipment and samples in and out of the Lunar Module
- Lymphoid endothelial cell - formed in lymphangiogenesis

== Other uses ==
- Legal Education Certificate, a professional certification allowing its holder to practice law in the Commonwealth Caribbean
- Levelised energy cost, the average whole-lifetime cost of electricity from a power plant
- Levy Exemption Certificate, issued to some emitters under the UK Climate Change Levy
- Local enterprise company, a type of government-owned economic development organization in Scotland
- Lee–Enfield Cavalry Carbine Mk I, a British rifle
- Logic equivalence checking, alternate name for Formal equivalence checking, a process in electronic design automation
- League of Legends EMEA Championship (LEC), formerly "League of Legends European Championship" (LEC) and "Europe League Championship Series" (EU LCS), Europe's top professional league in League of Legends

== See also ==
- Stanisław Jerzy Lec (1909–1966), Polish aphorist
- Stari Lec, a village in Serbia
- Lech (disambiguation)
- Leck (disambiguation)
- Lek (disambiguation)
