= Wat Rong Suea Ten =

Buddhist temple in Chiang Rai, Thailand

Coordinates: 19°55′24″N 99°50′30″E

- วัดร่องเสือเต้น
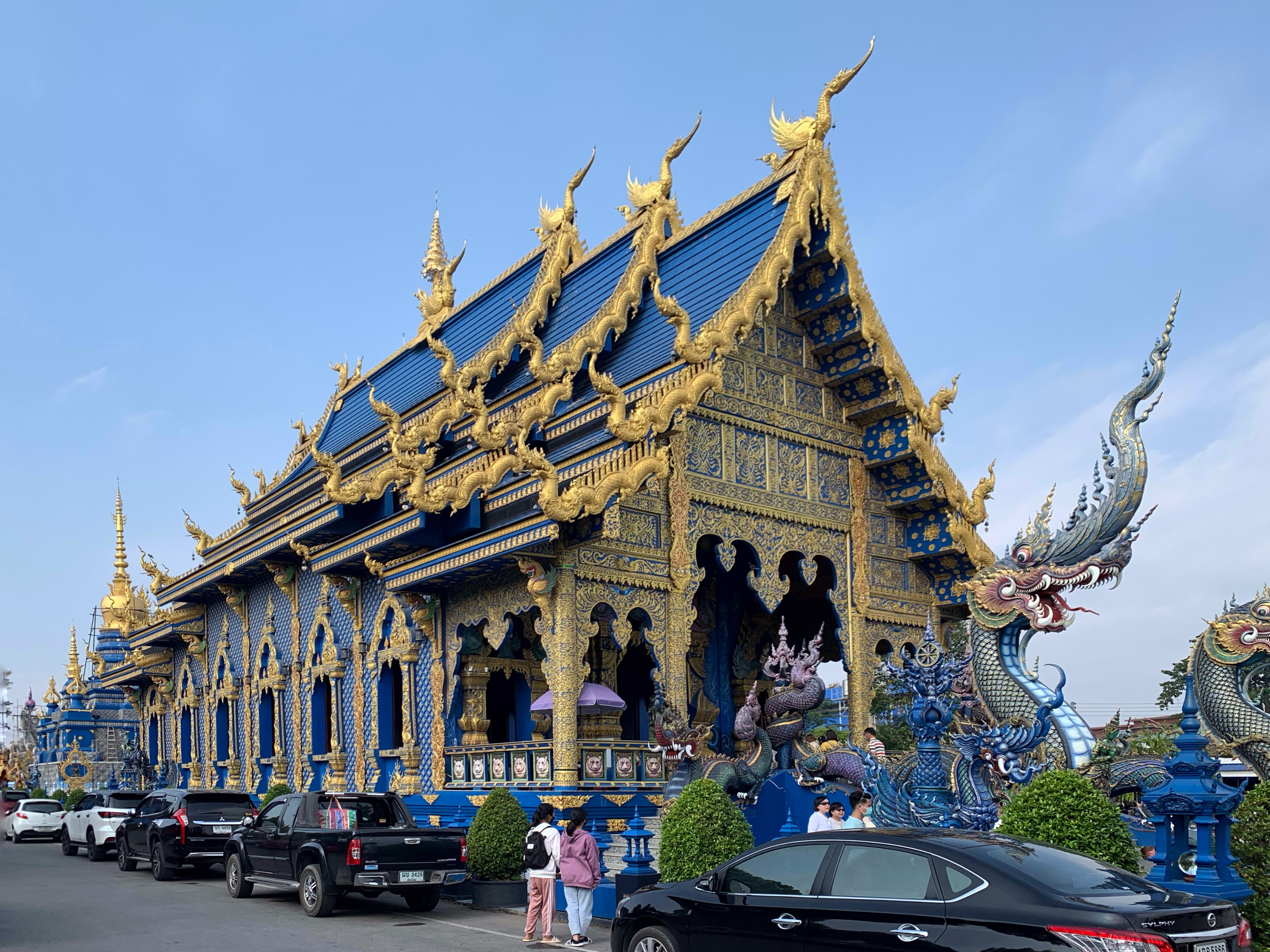

Religion
- Affiliation: Maha Nikaya Buddhism
- Province: Chiang Rai

Location
- Location: Rimkok Subdistrict, Mueang District, Chiang Rai, Thailand
- Interactive map of Wat Rong Suea Ten

Architecture
- Architect: Phuttha Kabkaew
- Style: Thai Modern Architecture; Neotraditional Thai art
- Completed: 2016

Website
- www.tourismthailand.org/Attraction/wat-rong-suea-ten

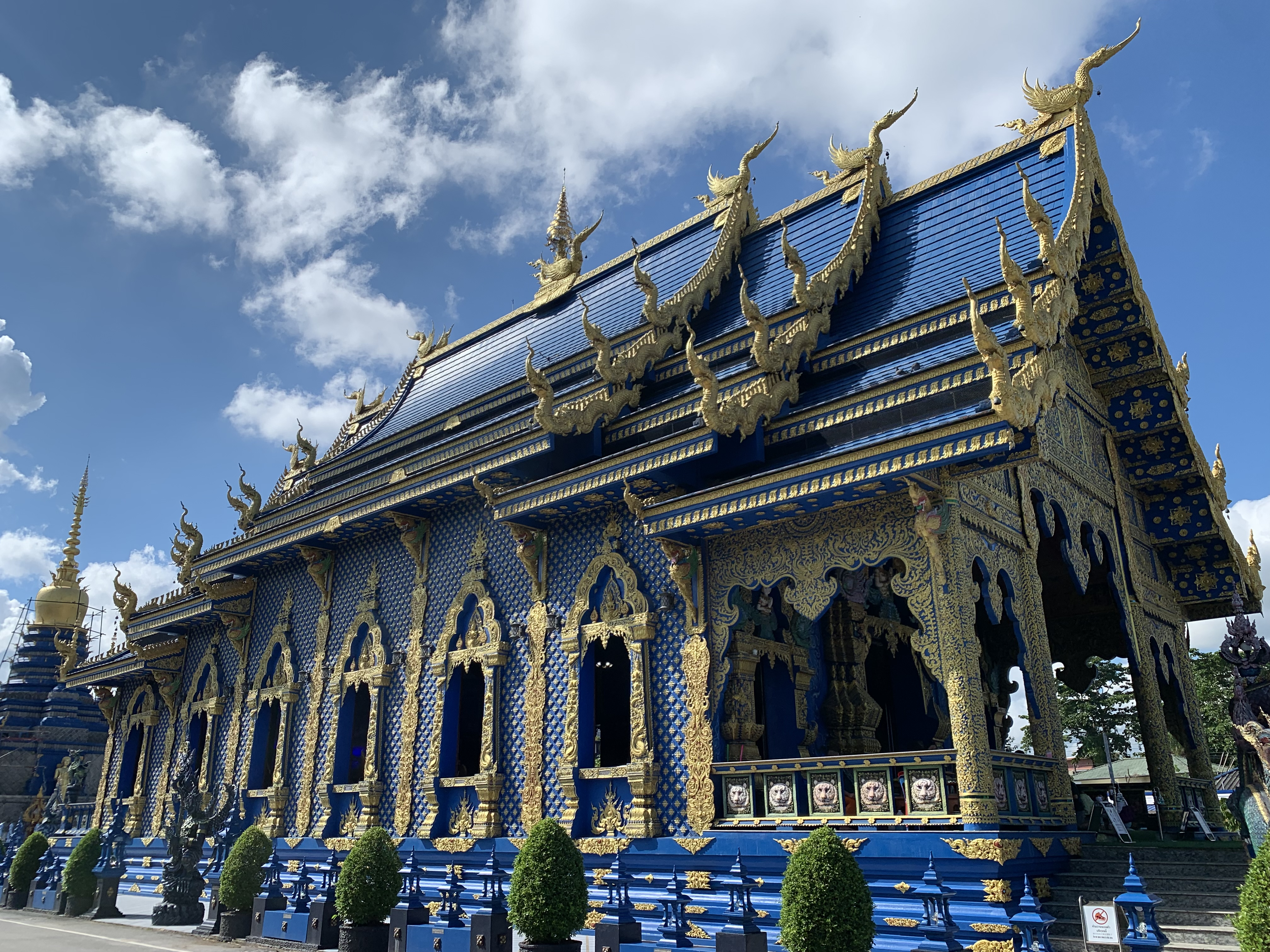
Wat Rong Suea Ten (Blue Temple, Chiang Rai)

Wat Rong Suea Ten (Thai: วัดร่องเสือเต้น), better known as the Blue Temple, is a Buddhist temple in Chiang Rai, Thailand, known for its striking modern artistic design.

== History ==
An abandoned temple with ancient brick remains stood previously on the same site. The temple's replacement was initiated by the local community in 1996, but construction started on 27 October 2005. Its final design was realized by Chiang Rai folk artist Mr. Phuttha Kabkaew (พุทธา กาบแก้ว) (a.k.a. Sala Nok, สล่านก, sala is a northern Thai title for an artisan). He gained skills and learned from Chalermchai Kositpipat while working on his famous Wat Rong Khun, just outside the city. Wat Rong Suea Ten's main building was completed on 22 January 2016. It took 11 years to complete the construction. The architecture is the unconventional "neotraditional Thai art" style of Buddhism pioneered by Chalermchai, employing lavishly ornamented sculptures and psychedelic visual imagery.

== Structures and symbolism ==
The highlight of the temple is the vihāra of Wat Rong Suea Ten. Built and designed by Mr. Phuttha Kabkaew. The temple is 13 meters wide and 48 meters long. The temple has a blue with gold trim. In front of the temple are two large Nāgas side by side. The artwork style of Ajarn Thawan Duchanee was applied. Inside is the pearl white Buddha image named Phra Buddha Ratchamongkol Bodi Trilokanat. The lap width is 5 meters and the height is 6.5 meters. There are 88,000 Phra Rod Lamphun statues and many silver and gold rings buried under this Buddha statue. The area around the head includes relics of Lord Buddha. Behind the temple is a large stupa which contrasts with the blue, gold and sky.

The temple contains the Buddha's relics from the patriarch Krom Luang Wachirayansangworn (Charoen Suwatthana).

== Gallery ==
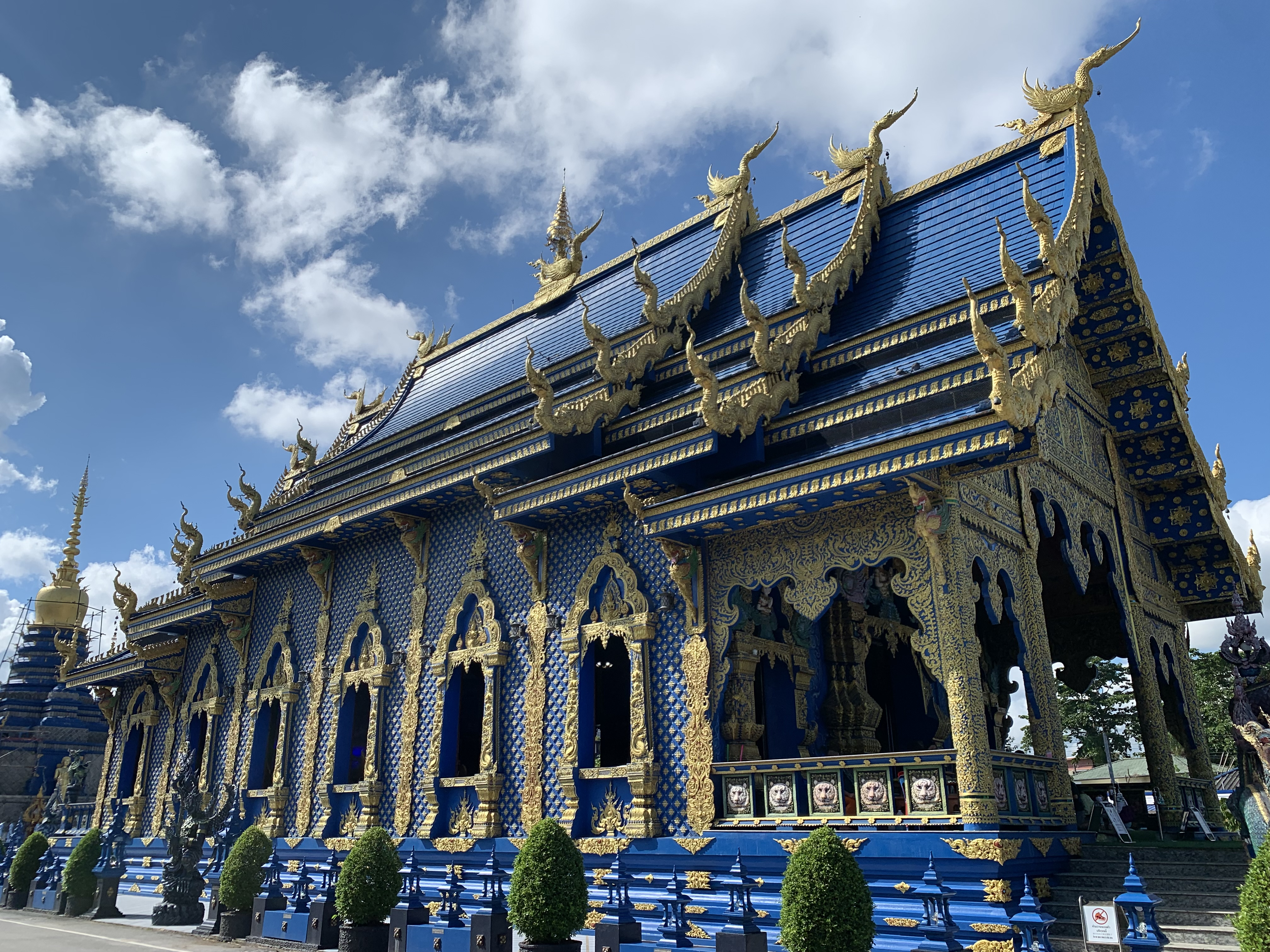

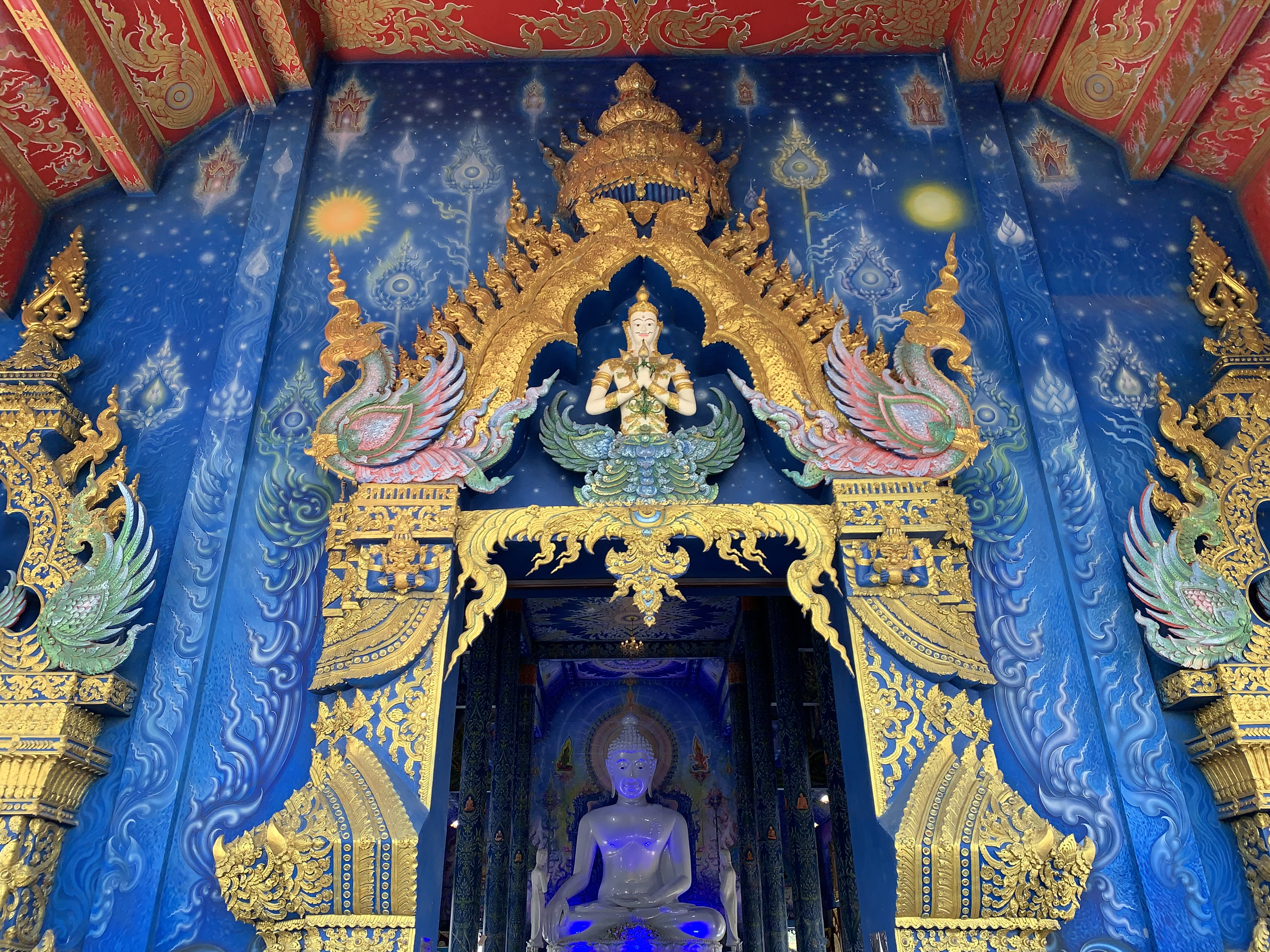

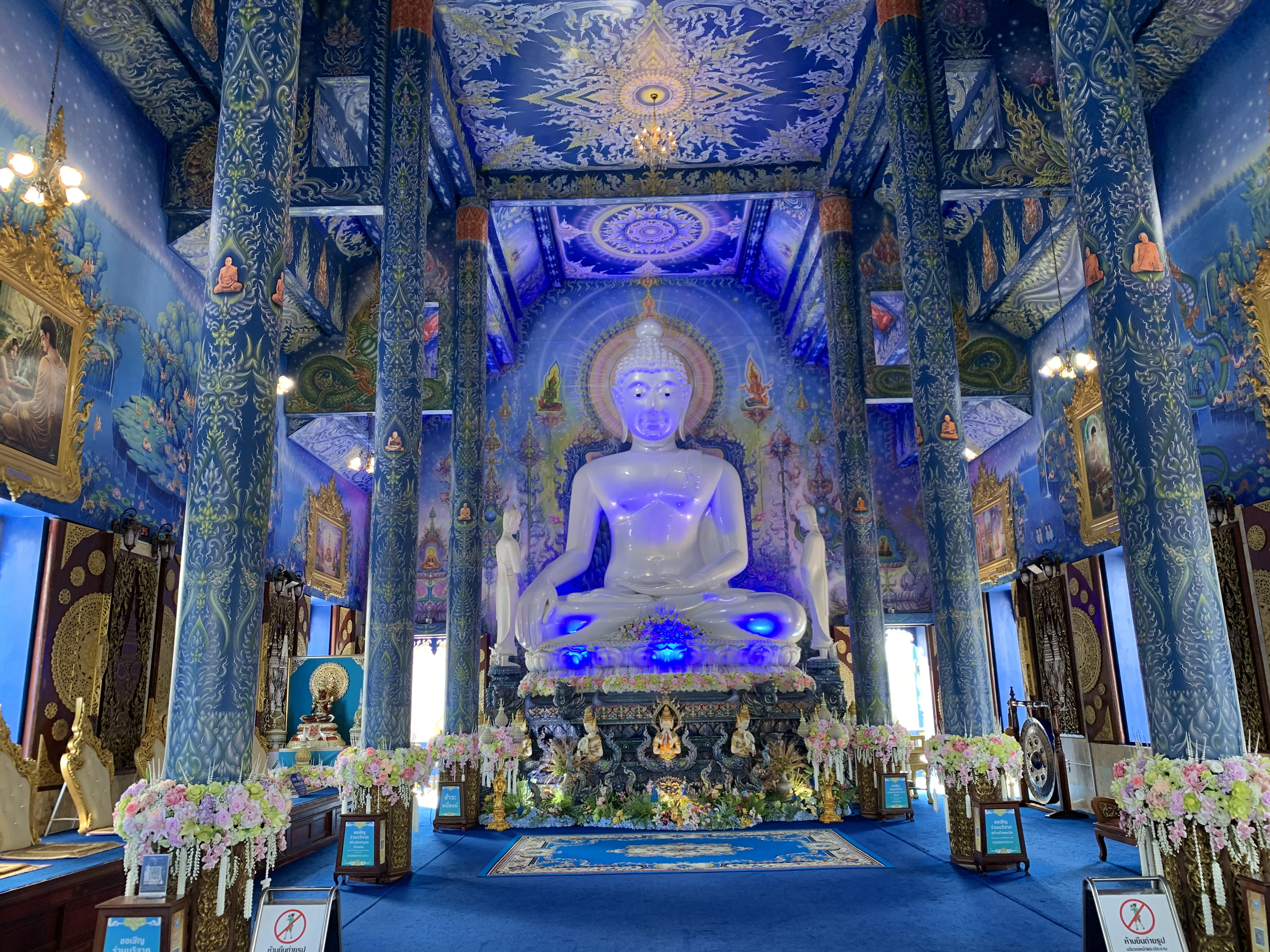

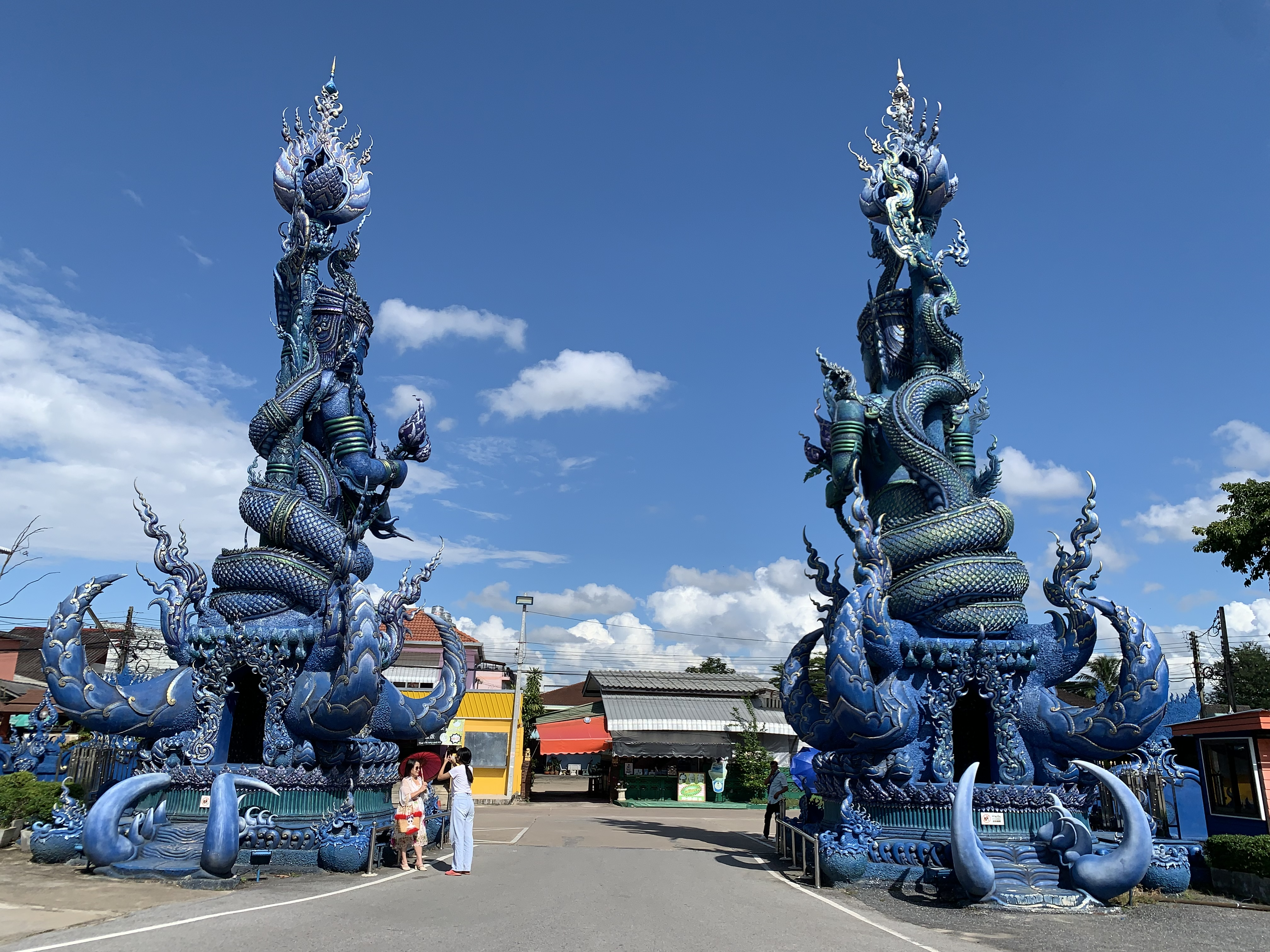

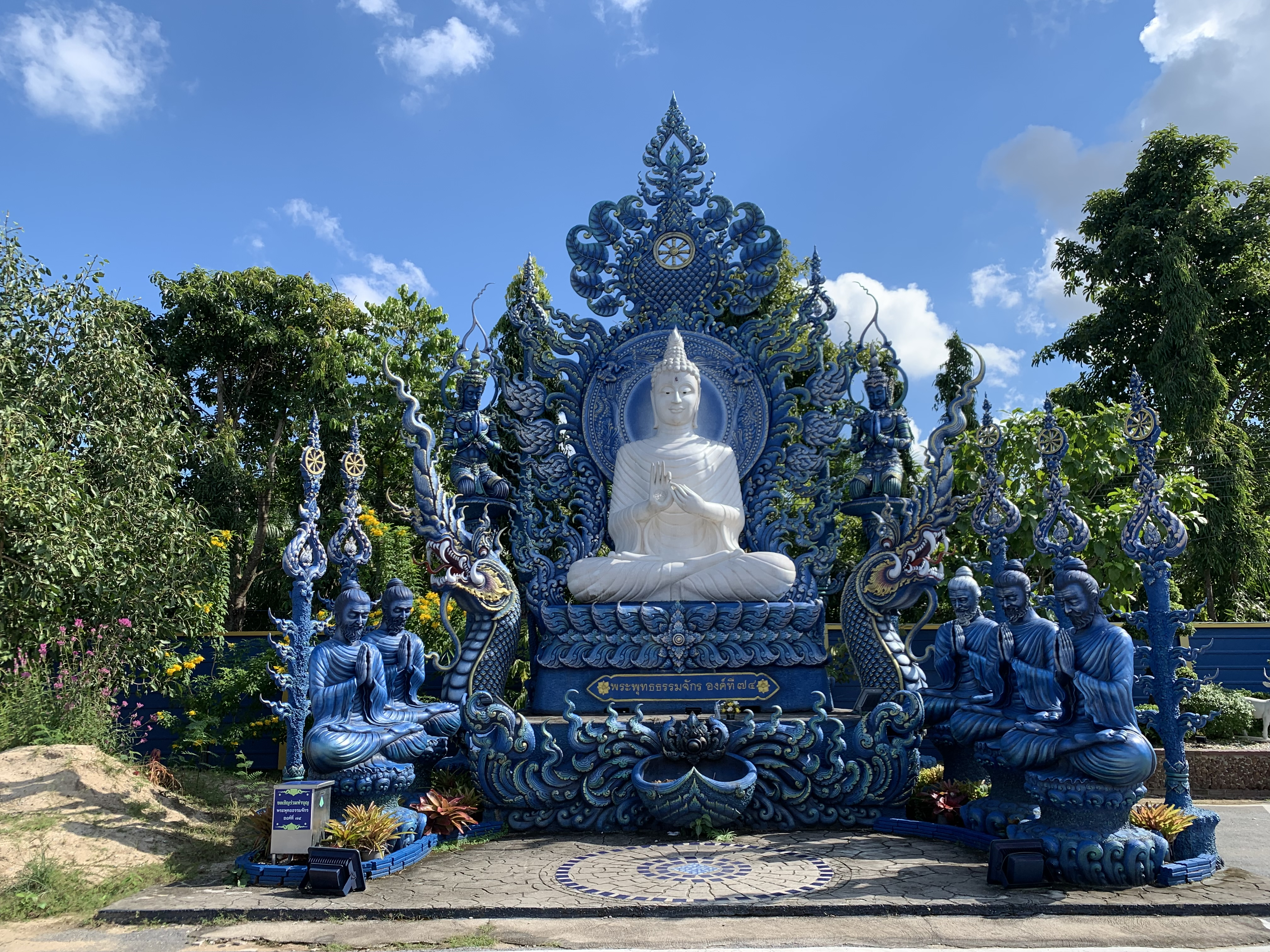
