= Chalermchai Kositpipat =

Thai artist

- เฉลิมชัย โฆษิตพิพัฒน์
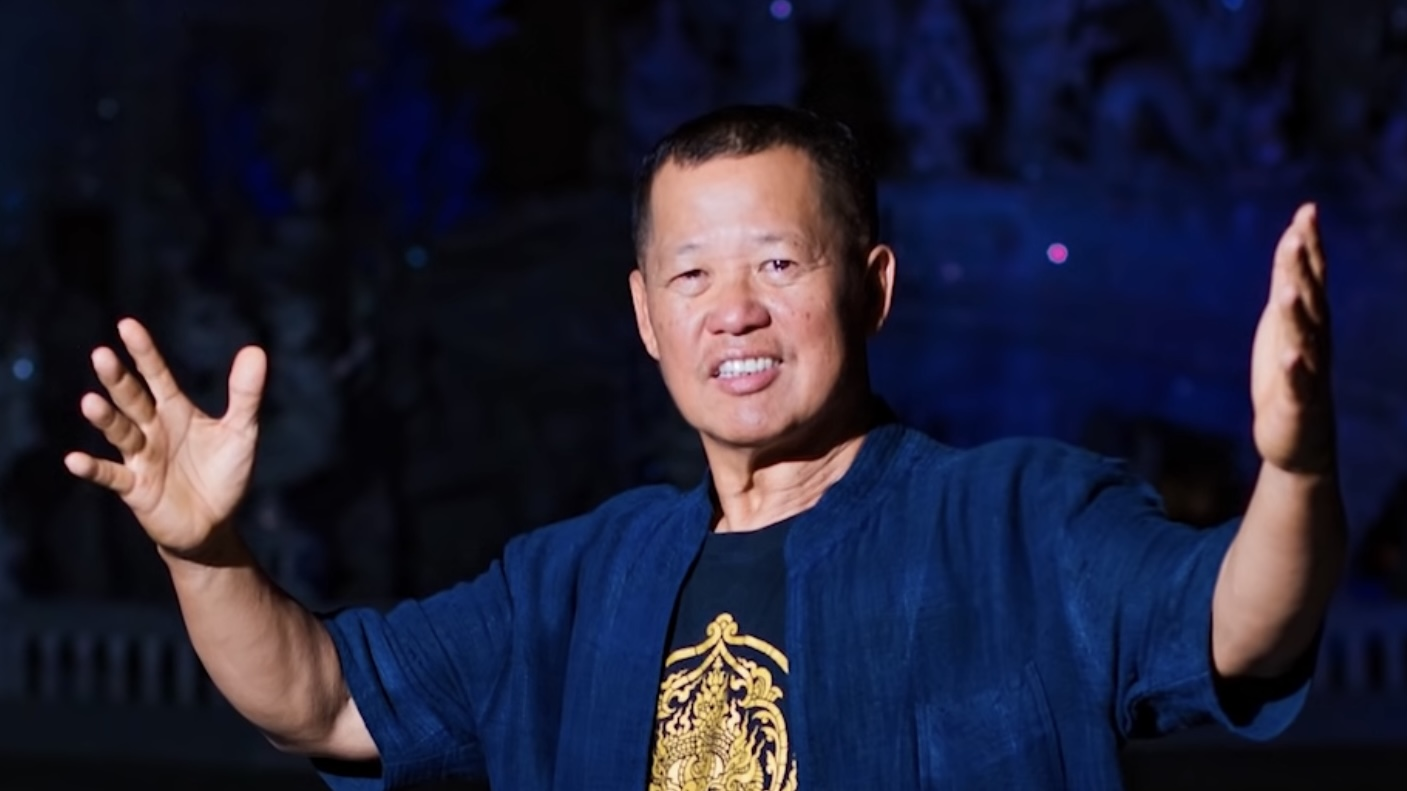
- Chalermchai at Wat Rong Khun in June 2021
- Born: 15 February 1955 (age 71); Mueang district, Chiang Rai, Thailand
- Education: Silpakorn University
- Known for: Painting
- Awards: Silpathorn Award 2004 Visual arts; National Artist 2011 Visual arts (painting)

Chalermchai Kositpipat (Thai: เฉลิมชัย โฆษิตพิพัฒน์, RTGS: Chaloemchai Khositphiphat, pronounced [tɕʰā.lɤ̌ːm.tɕʰāj kʰōː.sìt.pʰí.pʰát]; born 15 February 1955) is a Thai visual artist. Primarily a painter known for his use of Buddhist imagery, Chalermchai's works have been exhibited worldwide.

== Biography ==
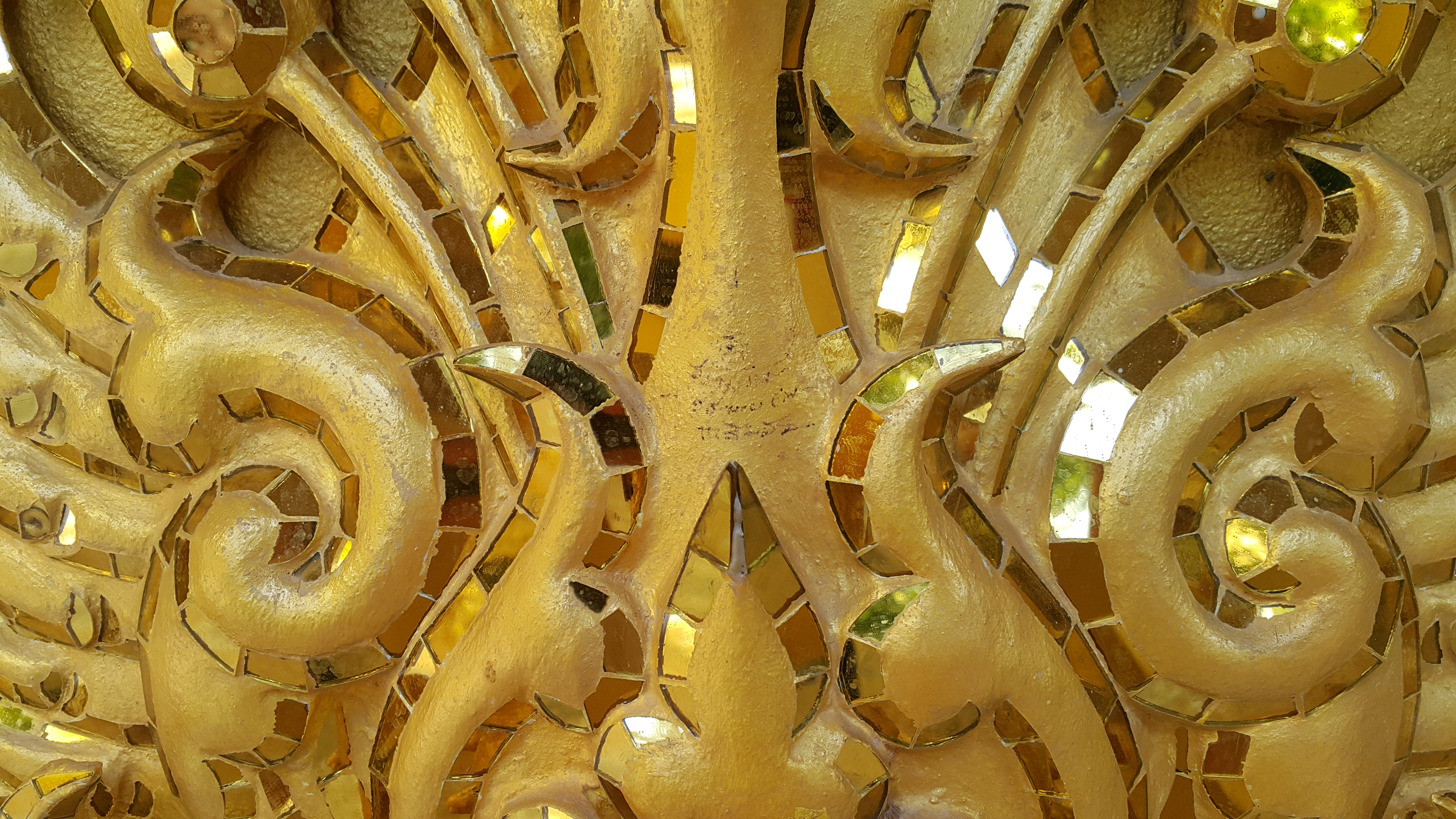
Chalermchai's signature on his work at Wat Rong Khun

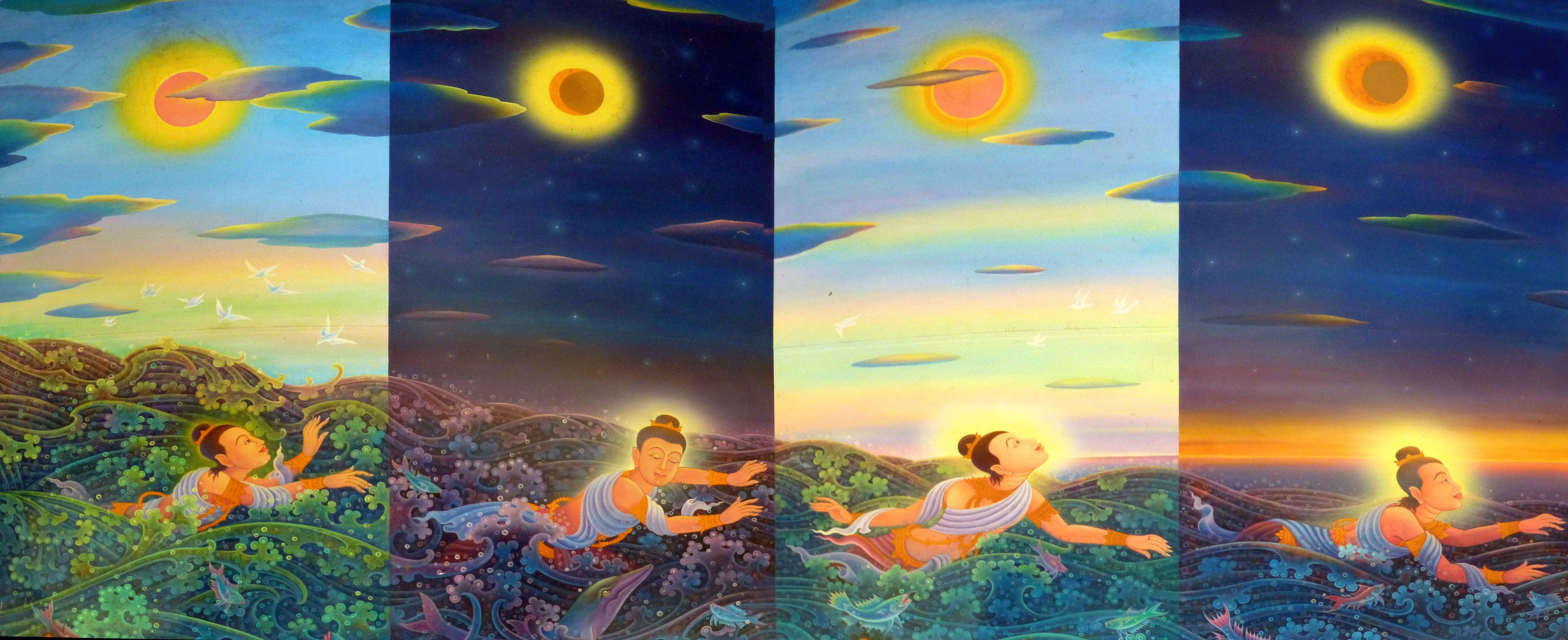
Prince Mahajanaka floated in the ocean for seven days before the goddess Manimekhala observed him in the water. An illustration for King Bhumibol Adulyadej's The Story of Mahajanaka created by Chalermchai Kositpipat.

Chalermchai Kositpipat was born into a Sino-Lanna family. His father was a Chinese immigrant from Chaoshan while his mother is Thai Chinese. He later attended Silpakorn University, which was Thailand's primary visual arts school. He graduated with a Bachelor of Fine Arts degree in Thai art in 1977.

He started out painting movie advertisements on billboards. His early murals mixed traditional Thai Buddhist temple art with contemporary images.

In 1980 Chalermchai visited Sri Lanka as his first trip abroad and stayed there for six months, studying Sri Lankan architecture, sculpture, painting and Buddhist temples. He was influenced by white statues and temples in Sri Lanka. He worked closely with Sri Lanka's veteran artist Manju Sri. Chalermchai held a solo art exhibition at Lionel Wendt Art Gallery in Colombo, Sri Lanka. After the exhibition he brought those art pieces to Thailand and sold it all.

He was commissioned in 1988 to paint murals for Wat Buddhapadipa in London. The murals took four years to complete and were controversial because of the contemporary styling. "I got complaints from everybody – from the [Thai] government, from monks and from other artists, saying that what I was doing was not Thai art" he was quoted as saying in 1998.

Eventually, his work became more accepted, with Thai King Bhumibol Adulyadej among his clients. One piece of his was sold for US$17,500 in 1998 at an auction of Thai art at Christie's Singapore. Another one of his pieces, Food Offering to Monks, sold for US$59,375 on 7 March 2018.

Among his works is Wat Rong Khun, an ornate white Buddhist temple being built in his native Chiang Rai province. Work on the temple was started in 1997, and still continues.

"Only death can stop my dream but cannot stop my project" Chalermchai was quoted as saying about the temple, adding that he believes the work will give him "immortal life". He was the first visual arts honoree for the inaugural Silpathorn Award, created in 2004 to honor living Thai contemporary artists at mid-career. Later in 2011, he was honored by Thailand's National Culture Commission as a National Artist.

== See also ==
- Luang Pu Bunleua Sulilat / Sala Keoku / Buddha Park
- Lek Viriyaphant / Sanctuary of Truth / Ancient Siam / Erawan Museum
- Visionary environments
