= María Ángeles Fernández Cuesta =

Spanish female painter (born 1950)

- Born: 1950; 75 years ago Toledo, Spain
- Known for: Visionary environments; Painting
- Movement: Outsider art
- Patron(s): Hervé Couton

María Ángeles Fernández Cuesta (La Pinturitas) (born 1950) is a Spanish self-taught artist known for her ongoing painting work which has transformed the facade of a derelict restaurant in Arguedas, Navarre into a continuously evolving visionary environment.

== Life ==
María Ángeles Fernández Cuesta was born in 1950 in Toledo, Spain. Before she was ten her mother died in childbirth. She spent her childhood in Toledo until moving with her father to Arguedas. In 1973 she married Miguel Galarret and they soon had three children. Much later she gave birth to another child. At times Fernández experienced emotional agitation, including an episode which led to her youngest child being taken into care by social services and housed elsewhere, resulting in a situation in which Fernández could not determine her child's location. Villagers mockingly called her La Pinturitas because of the extravagant makeup she often covered her face with. At 50 “para olvidar las penas”, to forget her pains, she began to paint. This activity became central to her existence, and a decade later she felt that “Me he ganado el respeto de los jóvenes”, she had gained the respect of the young people. She continues to paint as of 2018.

== Work ==
María Ángeles Fernández Cuesta began creating works which blended image: people, animals and faces, with text, as a means to express and ease troubling emotions, in 2000 when she was 50 years old. She chose to make her paintings on the exterior walls of a derelict building in Arguedas that was near a busy roadway. Her paintings came to completely cover the walls of the building in bright primary colored paintings that stretch fifty meters.

== Recognition ==
Photographer Hervé Couton discovered María Ángeles Fernández Cuesta's paintings in 2009 and has returned yearly to create photographs of her work, which have been published internationally in periodicals such as Raw Vision and on the internet.

In 2015 the society "Les Amis de La Pinturitas D'Arguedas", Friends of La Pinturitas of Arguedas, was established in Montauban, France.
