= Lek Viriyaphan =

Thai businessman

- เล็ก วิริยะพันธุ์
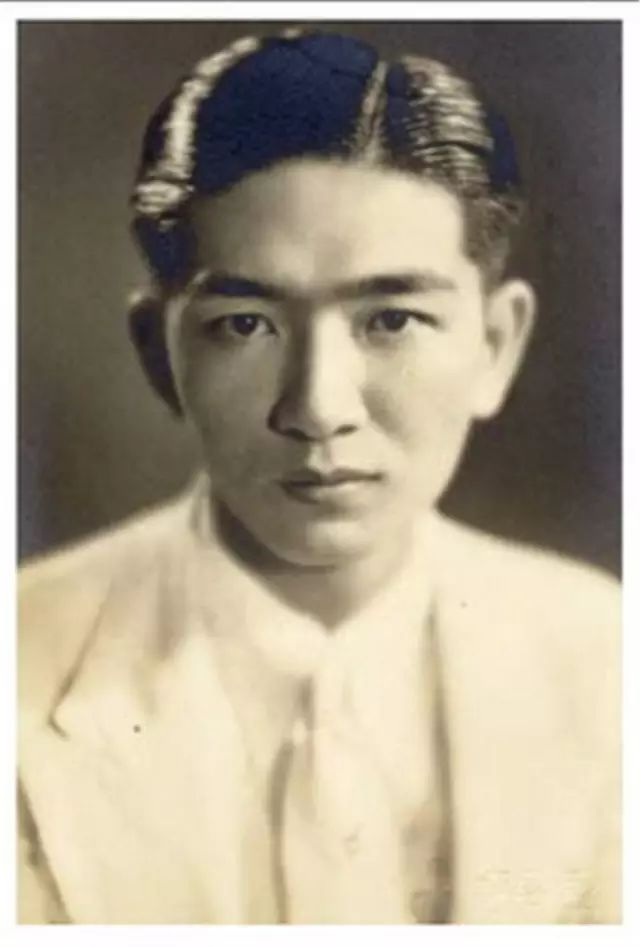
- Lek Viriyaphan at the young age
- Born: 1914; Sampeng, Bangkok, Thailand
- Died: November 17, 2000 (aged 85–86); Bangkok, Thailand
- Occupation: Businessman
- Spouse: Prapai Viriyaphan

Lek Viriyaphan (Thai: เล็ก วิริยะพันธุ์, sometimes referred to as Khun Lek; 1914 – 17 November 2000) was an eccentric Thai businessman, millionaire and patron of culture responsible for the construction of Ancient Siam, Erawan Museum and Sanctuary of Truth.

== Biography ==
Lek Viriyaphan was born in 1914 into a Chinese businessman's family in Sampeng, Thailand. He was later sent to university in Shanghai, China. It was during this period that he got to travel and became interested in arts and cultures. He accumulated professional knowledge and understanding of arts, religions, philosophies and cultures since an early period of his life. Until when his father fell ill, he then came back to Thailand to help with the family business. Later, through work relationships he met his wife and lifelong friend Prapai Viriyaphan, who became a partner and inspiration throughout his business career. His interests in the arts started from reading and collecting antiques when he was still a businessman, the more he understood how precious these antique pieces were, the more he felt a strong sense to preserve them. This inspired him to build the Ancient Siam open-air museum park in Samut Prakhan, Thailand.

In 1941, Viriyaphan had bought Thonburi Panich Co, Ltd. The company got the right to distribute and service Mercedes Benz vehicles (both, commercial and passenger) in 1957. In 1942, he established Monton bank, it has merged with Kaset bank resulting today's Krungthai bank in 1966. In 1947, he established Viriya insurance company.

In 1961, he established the Thonburi Automotive Assembly Plant (TAAP). In 1979 the assembly of Mercedes cars (W123) was started in Samut Prakan Province. He has left his descendants a thriving group of companies that is still developing: besides expansion of a plant in 2017, the construction of the first factory producing batteries for plug-in hybrid electric vehicles in Southeast Asia was announced where Mercedes-Benz had invested 100 million Euros.

== See also ==
- Luang Pu Bunleua Sulilat / Sala Keoku / Buddha Park
- Chalermchai Kositpipat / Wat Rong Khun
- Wat Pa Maha Chedi Kaew
- Visionary environments

== Sources ==
- Planet, Lonely; Isalska, Anita; Bewer, Tim; Brash, Celeste; Bush, Austin; Eimer, David; Harper, Damian; Symington, Andy (2018). Lonely Planet Thailand. Lonely Planet. ISBN 9781787019263.
- "Muang Boran Museum - เมืองโบราณ พิพิธภัณฑ์เอกชนกลางแจ้ง ที่ใหญ่ที่สุดในโลก". Muang Boran Museum.
