= Lonsdale Energy Corp =

Lonsdale Energy is a utility corporation owned by the City of North Vancouver. It has been operating the community energy system since 2003, which serves one in four residents in the City.

Current energy sources include natural gas, renewable natural gas, heat recovery from an outdoor skating rink, geoexchange, solar and electric. It is planning to build a new energy centre to recover heat from wastewater add to it energy mix. Expected to be completed in 2027, it received funding from the federal and provincial governments to help build the new energy centre.

== History ==
The City of North Vancouver worked in partnership with Terasen Utility Services to begin delivering energy services to the Lower Lonsdale area of North Vancouver since 2003. It has received $8 million in government and private sector funding.

In 2019, the City of North Vancouver opened the Shipyards Skate Plaza, an outdoor skating rink. Wasted heat from the skating rink is used by Lonsdale Energy's community energy system to provide space heating and hot water to nearby homes.
