= Sanctuary of Truth =

Unfinished museum in Pattaya, Thailand

Coordinates: 12°58′22″N 100°53′20″E

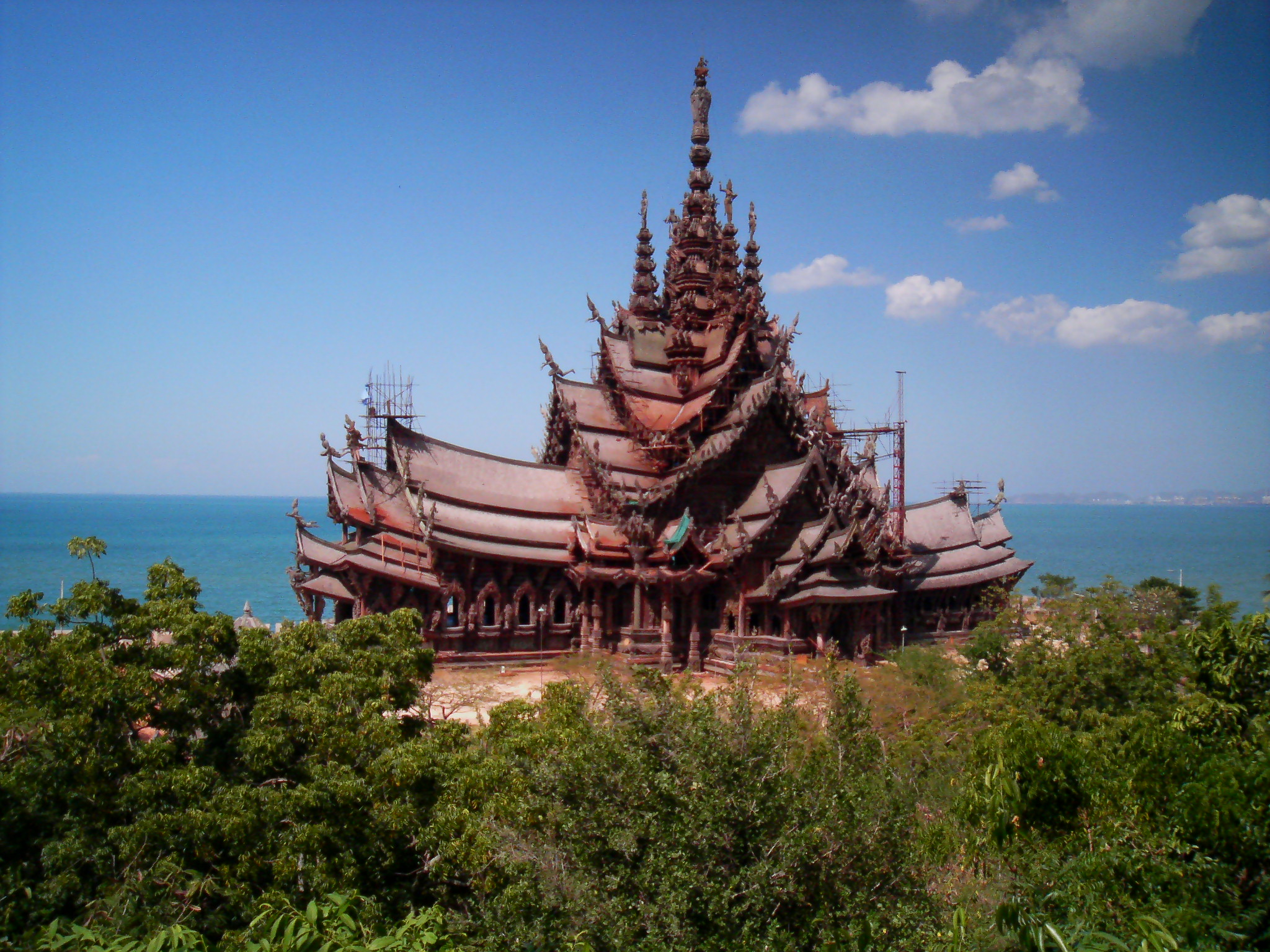

Religion
- Affiliation: Hinduism, Buddhism

Location
- Location: Pattaya, Chonburi, Thailand
- Interactive map of Sanctuary of Truth

Architecture
- Style: Thai, Hindu, Buddhist, Chinese, Burmese and Khmer

Website
- https://sanctuaryoftruthmuseum.com/

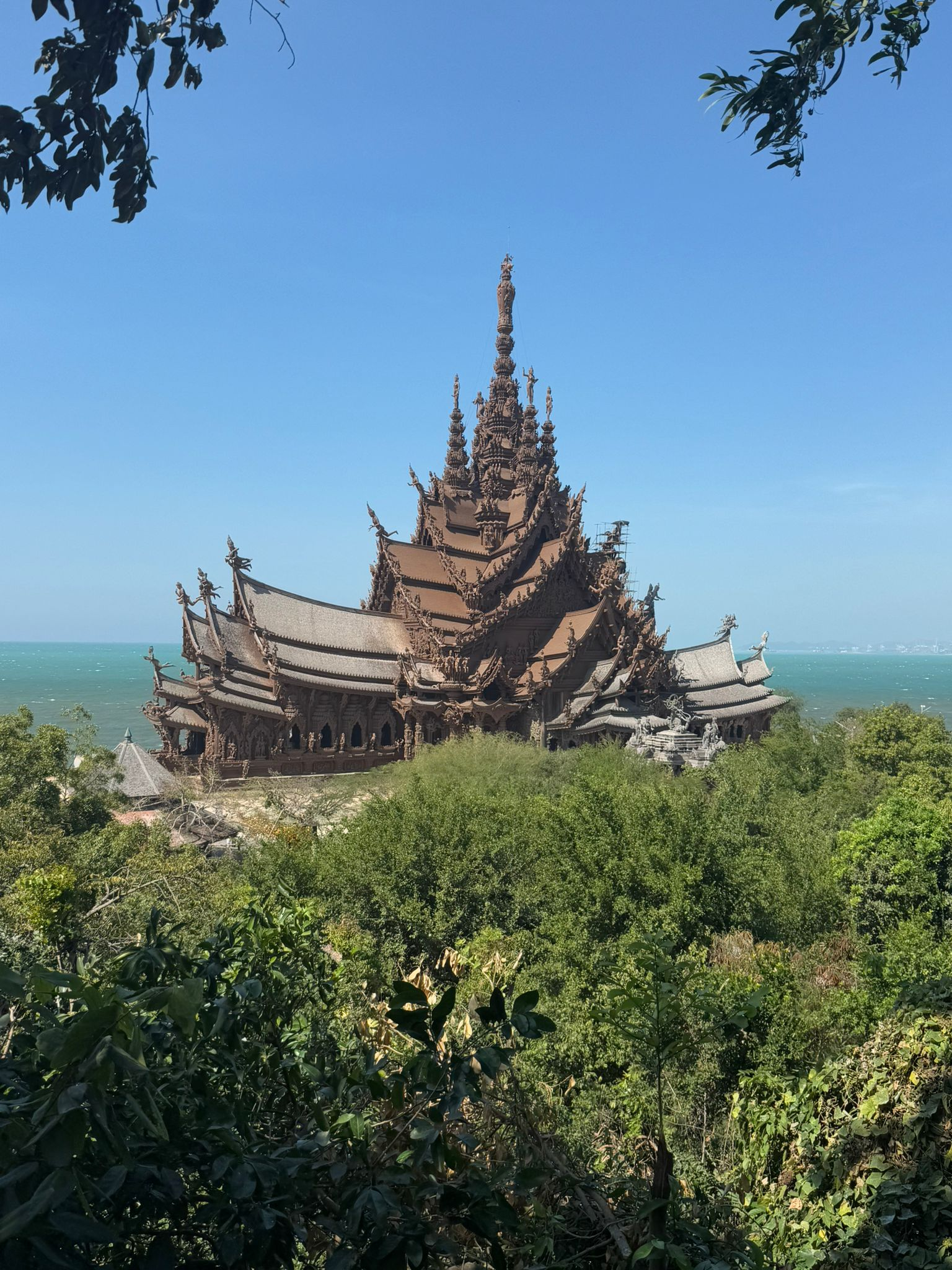
Sanctuary of Truth Photograph

The Sanctuary of Truth (Thai: ปราสาทสัจธรรม) is an unfinished museum in Pattaya, Thailand designed by Thai businessman Lek Viriyaphan. The museum structure is a hybrid of a temple and a castle that is themed on the Ayutthaya Kingdom and Hindu and Buddhist beliefs. The building is notably constructed entirely out of wood, specifically Mai Deang, Mai Takien, Mai Panchaat, and Teak. It contains only wood-carved idols and sculptures. Construction first began in 1981 and is still under ongoing, though visitors are permitted inside with hard hats. Located on 13 hectares of land, the museum houses an internal space of 2,115 m^{2}, with the tallest spire reaching 105 m (344 ft).

== History ==
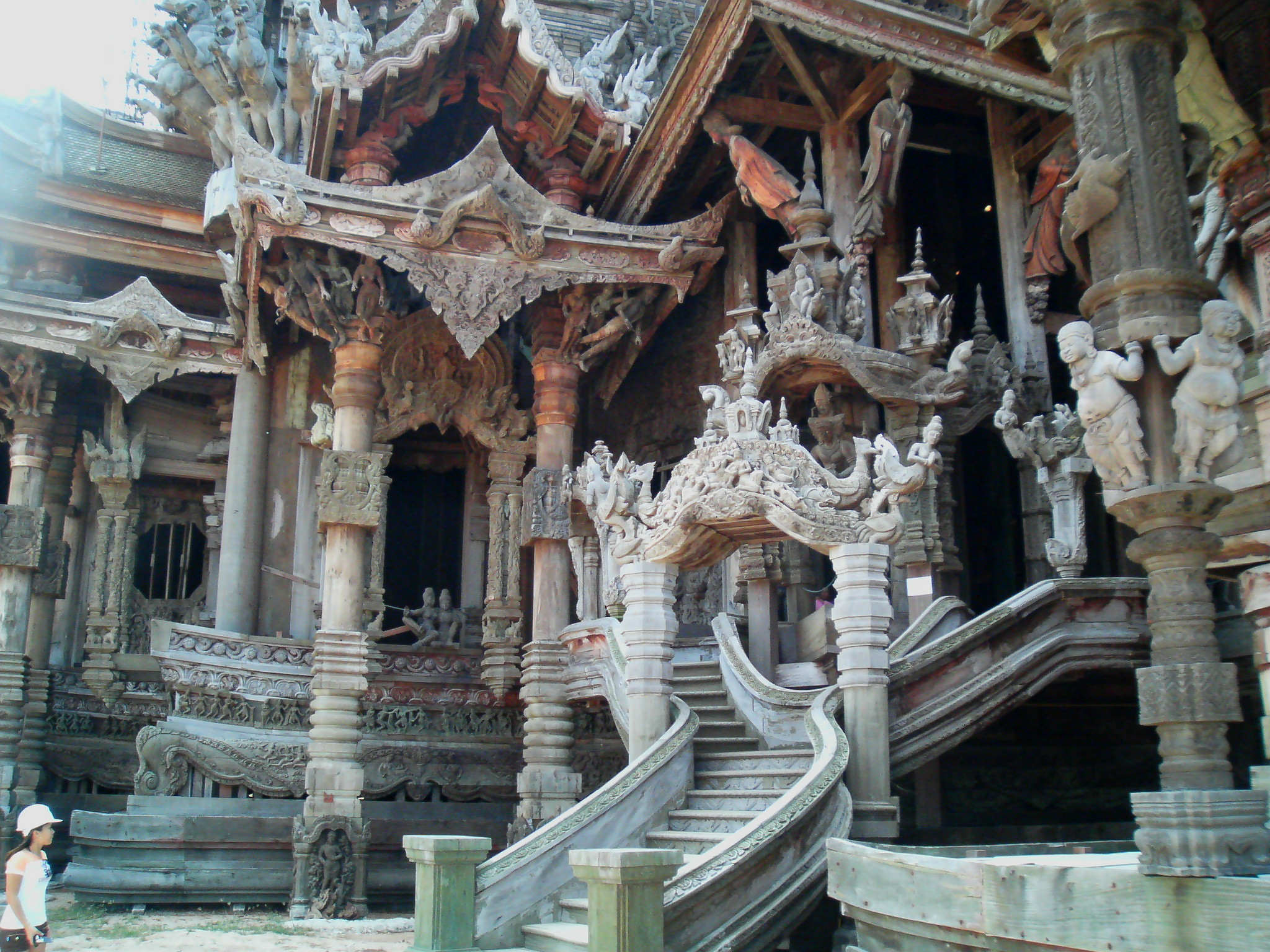
Main Entrance

The building has been under construction since 1981, and may not be finally completed until 2026 at the earliest. Though under construction, tourists are able to visit the sanctuary.

== Theme ==
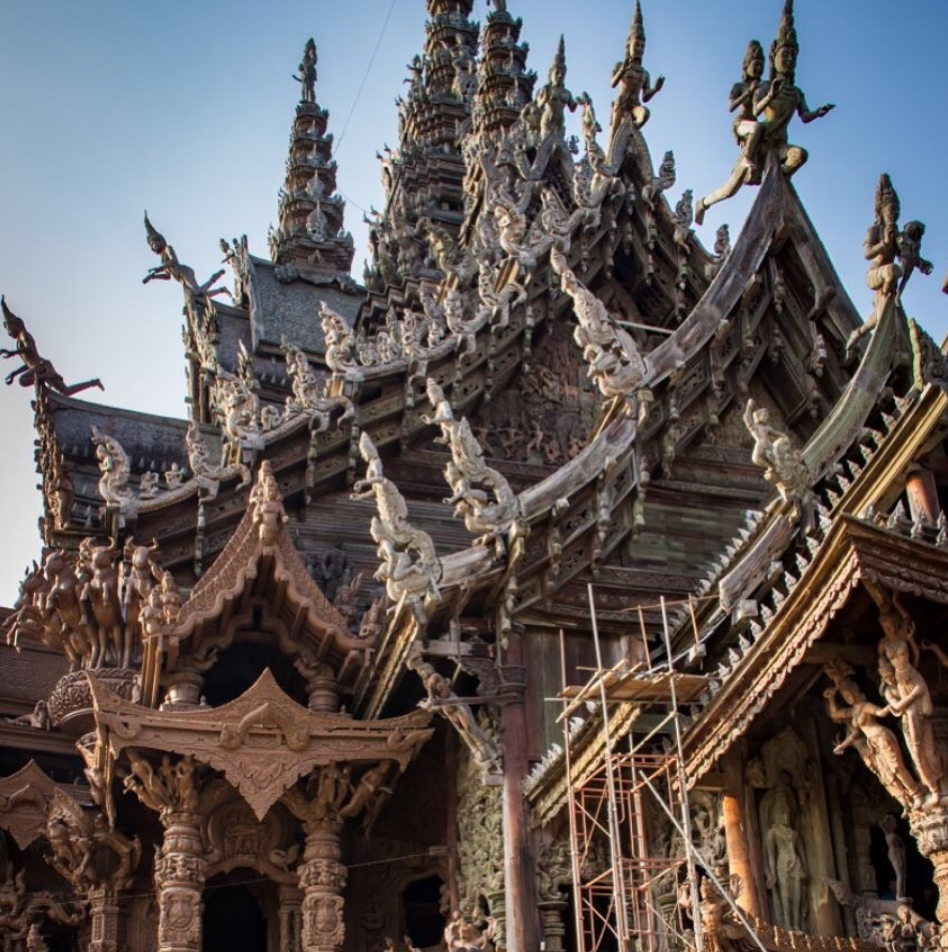
Upper part of the temple near

The museum features a four-faced Hindu creator god Brahma statue on its rooftop for showing respect to father, mother, teacher, and the king, and the elephant-headed god Ganesha. The Northern hall features Buddhist Guanyin and other sculptures featuring wisdom of emancipation. The Southern hall features astronomical themes, namely the sun, moon, and other planets impacting people's well-being. The Western hall features representations of the classical elements (earth, water, wind, and fire) and sculptures of the Hindu Trinity: Brahma, Vishnu, and Shiva, the gods who conquer the four elements. The Eastern hall features familial representations. The main focus is to visually portray important eastern religious concepts and the cycle of life.

== Architecture ==
Inspired by the temples in Ayutthaya, the hand-carved wood structure features Thai architecture. The museum was built by Lek Viriyaphan (Thai: เล็ก วิริยะพันธุ์). The structure is decorated with ornamentation drawing from Hindu and Buddhist influences.

The sanctuary is made of several different types of wood, giving different parts of the sanctuary different textures. The oldest wood that has been used is takien wood, used to build the main post and expected to last for 600 years. The structure is composed of wood such as Xylia xylocarpa (Thai: ไม้แดง), Mai-Takien, Mai-Panchart, and teakwood.

The central apex structure is 105 metres (300 feet) tall and the indoor space is 2,115 square meters.

== Activities ==
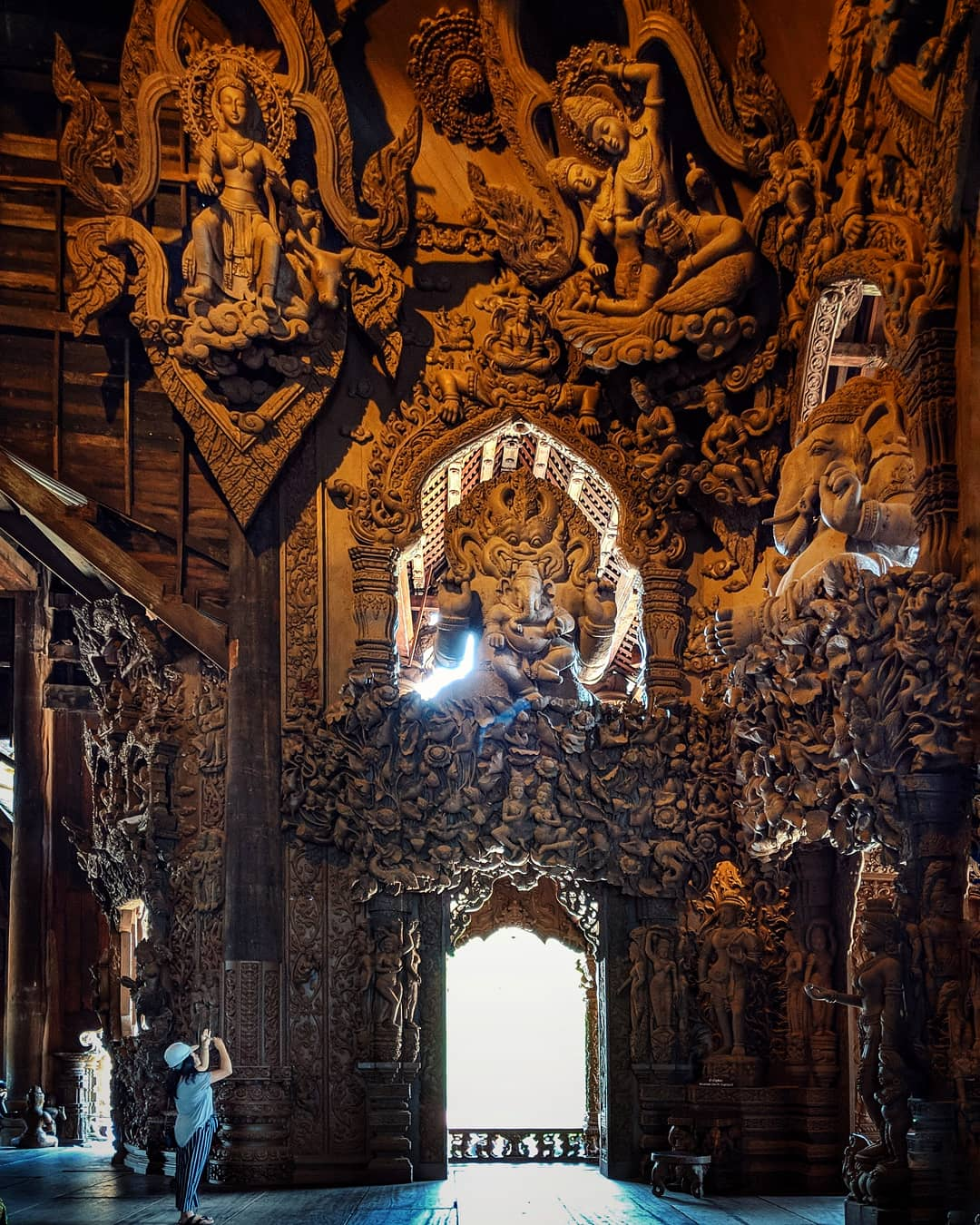
Interior

In addition to building tour services the museum also offers tourist activities such as Thai boat trips, elephant rides, horse carriage rides, horseback riding, speedboat rides, and Thai costume rental services. There is also a restaurant serving Thai and Halal food, a small zoo and an area where tourists can watch wood carvers constructing.

== See also ==
- Ancient Siam
- Luang Pu Bunleua Sulilat
- Sala Keoku
- Buddha Park
- Chalermchai Kositpipat
- Wat Rong Khun
- Wat Pa Maha Chedi Kaew
- Visionary environments
- Shwenandaw Monastery
