= Kirillov's house =

Building in Sverdlovsk region, Russia

Coordinates: 57.3962°N 60.4595°E

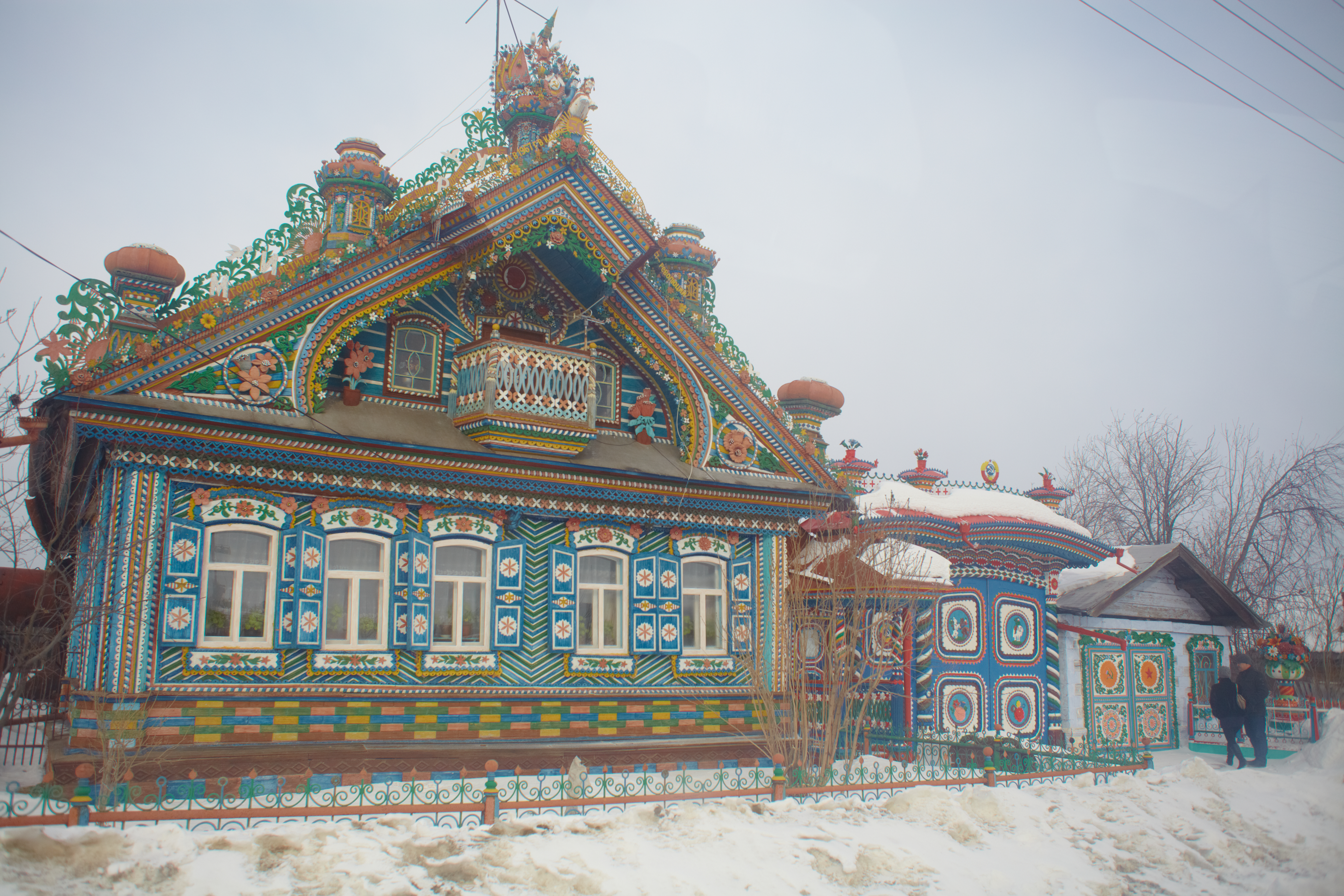
Kirillov's house in winter

Kirillov's house (Russian: Дом кузнеца Кириллова) is a prominent naïve decorative building located in the village Kunara of Sverdlovsk region in Russia. The building is a private residential home constructed between 1954 and 1967 by Sergey Kirillov, a blacksmith of the village. The structure combines the outlines of a traditional Russian decorative house (terem) with rich colorful ornaments and visual elements suggestive of fairy tales, children art and Soviet propaganda imagery.
