= Erawan Museum =

Museum in Thailand

Coordinates: 13°37′42″N 100°35′20″E

- พิพิธภัณฑ์ช้างเอราวัณ
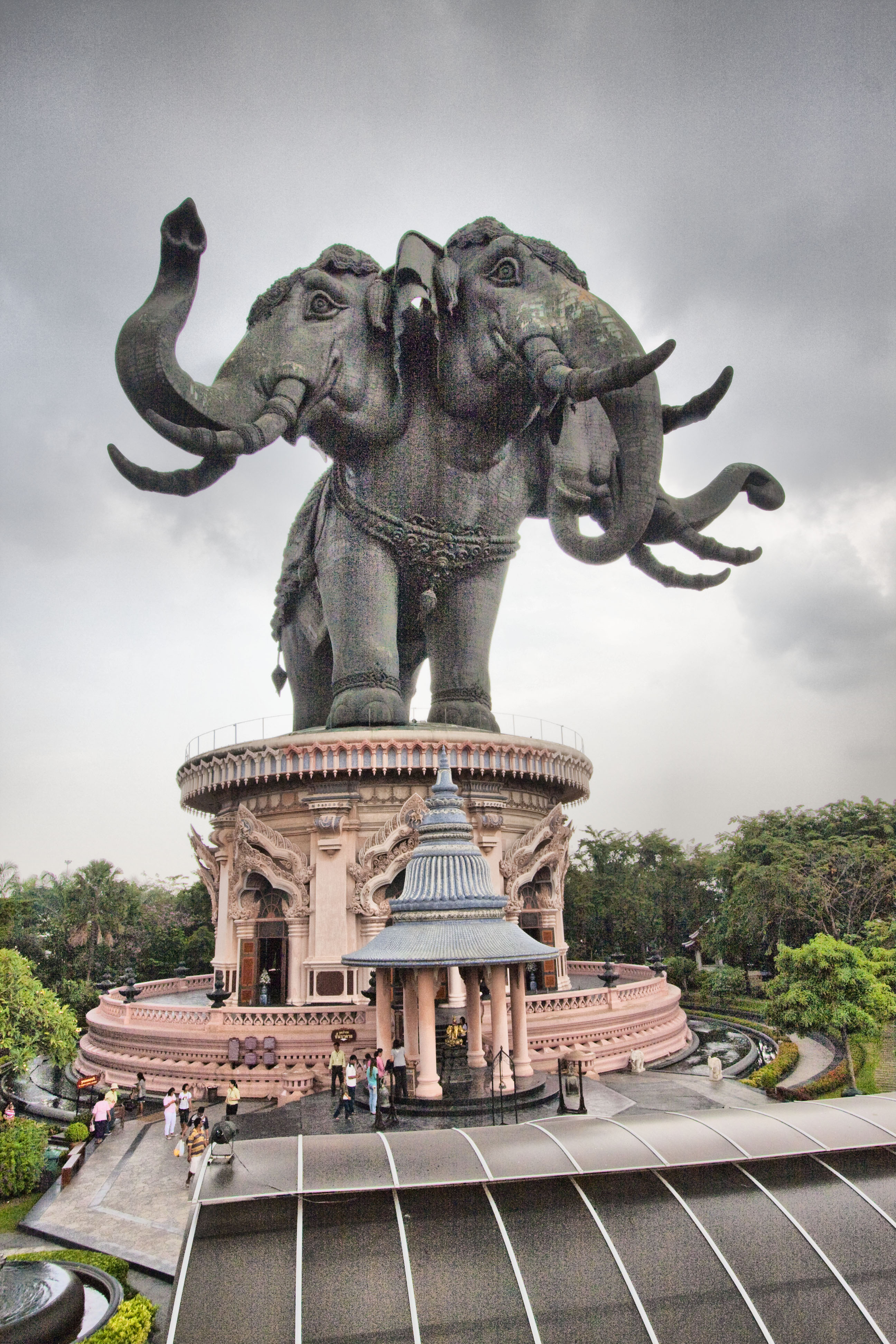
- Location: Sukhumvit Road, Samut Prakan, Thailand
- Website: erawan-museum.com

The Erawan Museum (Thai: พิพิธภัณฑ์ช้างเอราวัณ) is a museum in Samut Prakan province, Thailand. The museum was built in 2003. It is well known for its giant three-headed elephant art display. The three storeys inside the elephant contain antiquities and priceless collections of ancient religious objects belonging to Lek Viriyaphan who was the museum owner and also creator of the Ancient Siam and Sanctuary of Truth museums which stores artifacts and heritage items.

The museum displays model sculptures which shows many facets of Thai culture.

The museum is served by the Chang Erawan BTS station on the Sukhumvit Line.

== Museum ==
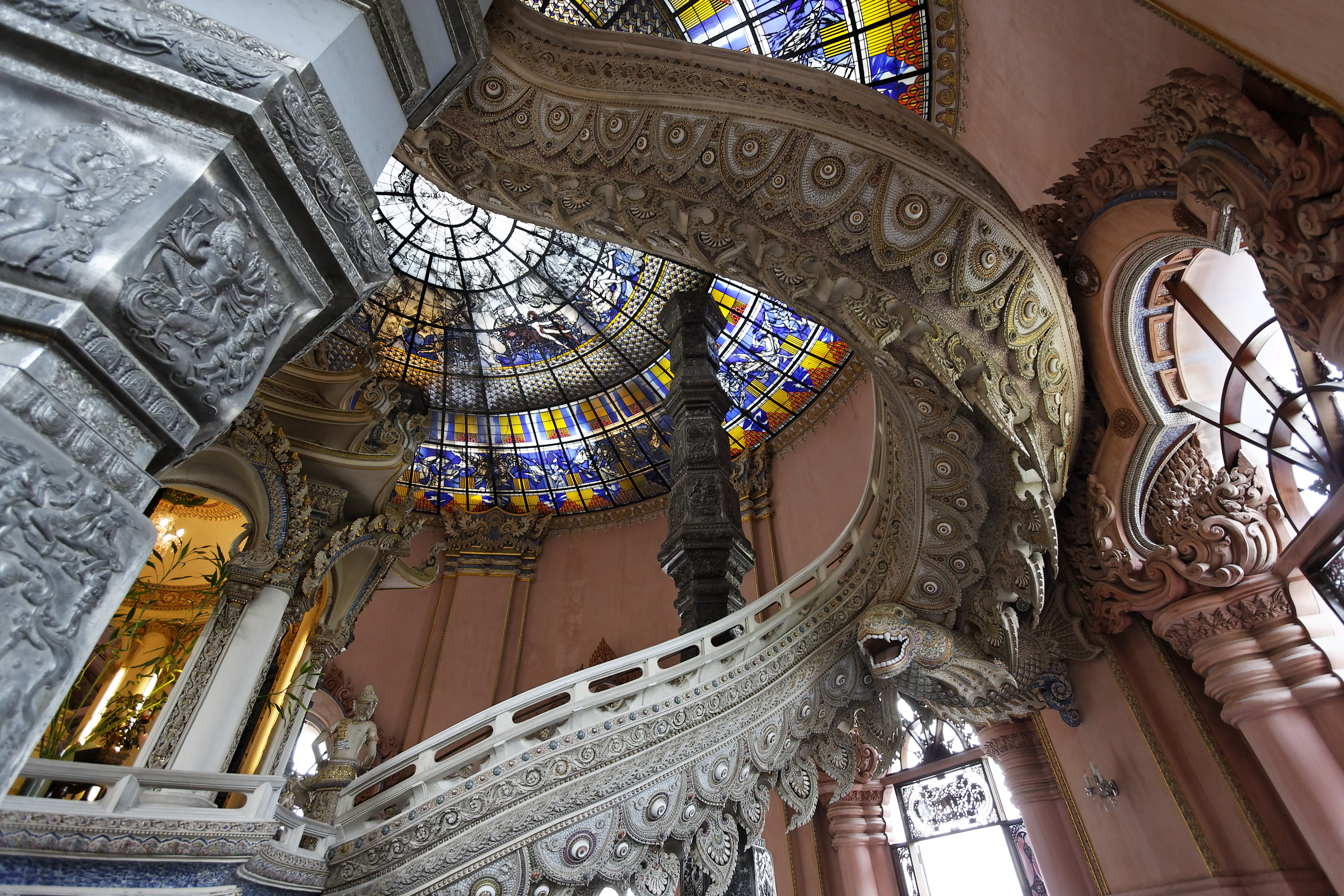
Inside the Erawan Museum

The massive three headed elephant made of bronze weighs 250 tons, is 29 metres high, 39 metres long and stands on a 15-meter-high (49 ft) pedestal. The inside of the museum is modeled after the Hindu representation of the universe. The lower two floors are located inside the pedestal while the top floor is located in the belly of the elephant.

The first floor contains a collection of Chinese vases from the Ming and Qing dynasties as well as the history of the museum's construction in photographs and wall placards.

The second floor houses precious antiques and arts including ceramics and European pottery. The hall features a statue of Guanyin, the Chinese Goddess with a thousand arms.

The top floor represents the Travatimsa Heaven, which is located on top of Mount Meru in Buddhist cosmology. On display are relics and statues of the Buddha from several eras such as Lopburi, Ayutthaya, Lanna and Rattanakosin. The walls are decorated with paintings depicting the cosmos.

== See also ==
- Ancient Siam
- Sanctuary of Truth
- List of museums in Thailand
- List of museums and art galleries in Bangkok
