= Wat Pa Maha Chedi Kaew =

Buddhist temple made of bottles in Khun Han district, Sisaket province, Thailand

- วัดป่ามหาเจดีย์แก้ว
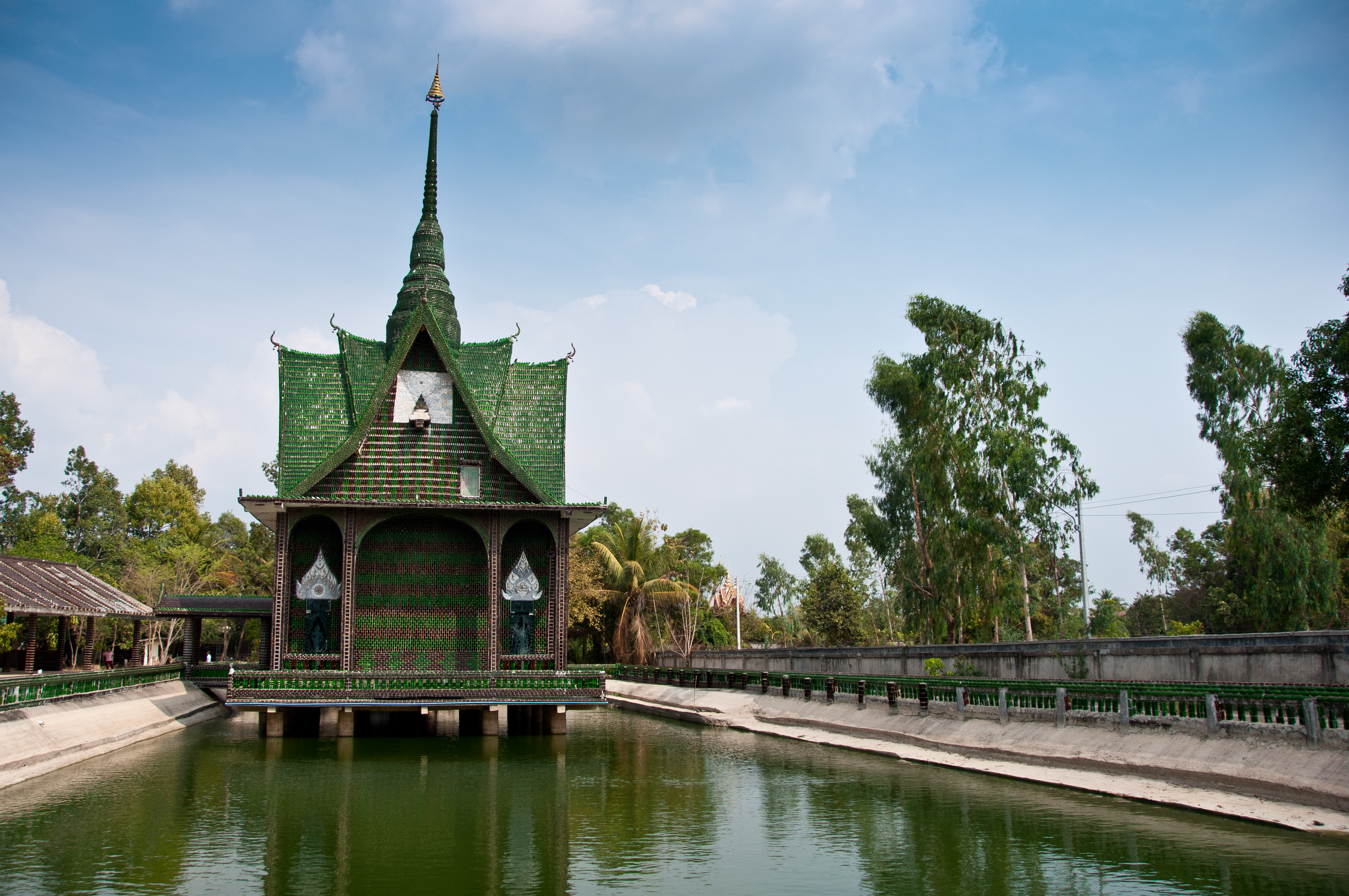
- Wat Pa Maha Chedi Kaew in 2011

Religion
- Affiliation: Buddhism
- District: Khun Han
- Province: Sisaket

Location
- Interactive map of Wat Pa Maha Chedi Kaew
- Coordinates: 14.618516°N 104.418962°E

Architecture
- Groundbreaking: 1984
- Completed: 1986
- Materials: Glass bottles

Wat Pa Maha Chedi Kaew (Thai: วัดป่ามหาเจดีย์แก้ว, RTGS: Wat Pa Maha Chedi Kaeo, lit. 'Wilderness Temple of the Great Glass Pagoda'), also known as the Temple of a Million Bottles, is a Buddhist temple in Khun Han district of Sisaket province, Thailand. The temple is made of over 1.5 million empty Heineken bottles and Chang beer bottles. Collection of the bottles began in 1984; it took two years to build the main temple. Thereafter, the monks continued to expand the site, and by 2009 some 20 buildings had been similarly constructed.

== History ==
According to the China Daily, "The Thai Buddhist temple has found an environmentally friendly way to utilize discarded bottles to reach nirvana."

== Construction ==
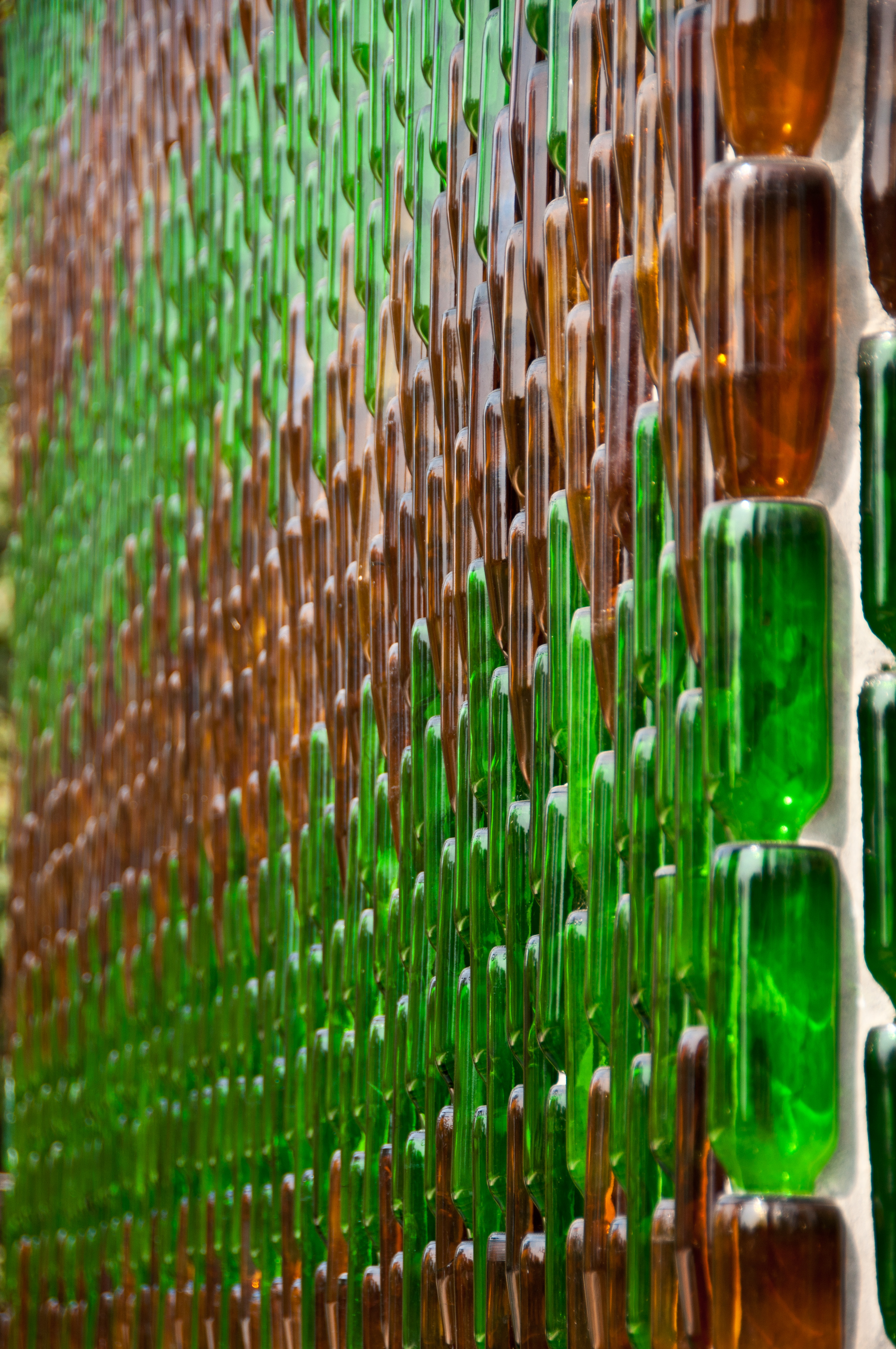
Detail of the bottles in a bottle wall.

The main temple has a concrete core, with collected bottles used as construction materials. Two types of bottles are used; green Heineken bottles and brown Chang bottles. After the local monks began to collect them in 1984 for use as a building material, the local government sent additional bottles. In addition to the bottles themselves, the bottle caps are used to create mosaics. As of 2009 there were a total of 20 buildings constructed in this fashion; in addition to the temple there were a crematorium, a series of prayer rooms, the local water tower, bathrooms for the use of tourists as well as several raised bungalows which are used as housing for the monks.

The main temple took two years to construct, but as the materials were still available the site is continually expanded. By 2009 there were more than 1.5 million bottles in use in the construction works at the temple site, leading to Wat Pa Maha Chedi Kaew also being known as the "Temple of a Million Bottles." In 2015, it was named one of the ten leading examples of sustainable architecture by travel website When on Earth.

Parenthetically, 50 years ago the Heineken company looked into changing their bottles so that they could be used as building blocks, a construction material. While nothing came of that, the monks found a way.

== See also ==
- Bunleua Sulilat
- Wat Rong Khun
- Sanctuary of Truth
