= Leck, Virginia =

Unincorporated community in Virginia, United States

Coordinates: 37°02′17″N 82°24′03″W

Leck is an unincorporated community in Dickenson County, Virginia, United States.

== History ==
A post office was established at Leck in 1901, and remained in operation until it was discontinued in 1961. It was named for Elexius "Leck" Smith, a settler.
