= Leck =

Leck may refer to:

== Places ==
- Conwal and Leck, Ireland
- Leck, Lancashire, England
- Leck, Nordfriesland, Germany
- Leck, Virginia, U.S.

== Other uses ==
- Leck (rapper), French rapper of Moroccan origin
- Bart van der Leck (1876–1958), Dutch neoplasticist artist
- Leck (song), a single by Morgenshtern feat. Imanbek & Fetty Wap
