= Lək, Samukh =

Lək
- Municipality
- Location within Azerbaijan
- Coordinates: 40°47′58″N 46°29′17″E
- Country: Azerbaijan
- Rayon: Samukh

Population
  - Total: 1,137
- Time zone: UTC+4 (AZT)
  - Summer (DST): UTC+5 (AZT)

Lək (also, Lyak, Lyaki, and Lyala) is a village and municipality in the Samukh Rayon of Azerbaijan. It has a population of 1,137.
