= Lək, Barda =

Lək
- Municipality
- Location within Azerbaijan Location within Karabakh Economic Region
- Coordinates: 40°21′47″N 47°08′57″E
- Country: Azerbaijan
- Rayon: Barda

Population
  - Total: 1,055
- Time zone: UTC+4 (AZT)
  - Summer (DST): UTC+5 (AZT)

Lək (also, Lak) is a village and municipality in the Barda Rayon of Azerbaijan. It has a population of 1,055.
