= Ancient Siam =

Open-air museum park in Thailand

Ancient City
- เมืองโบราณ
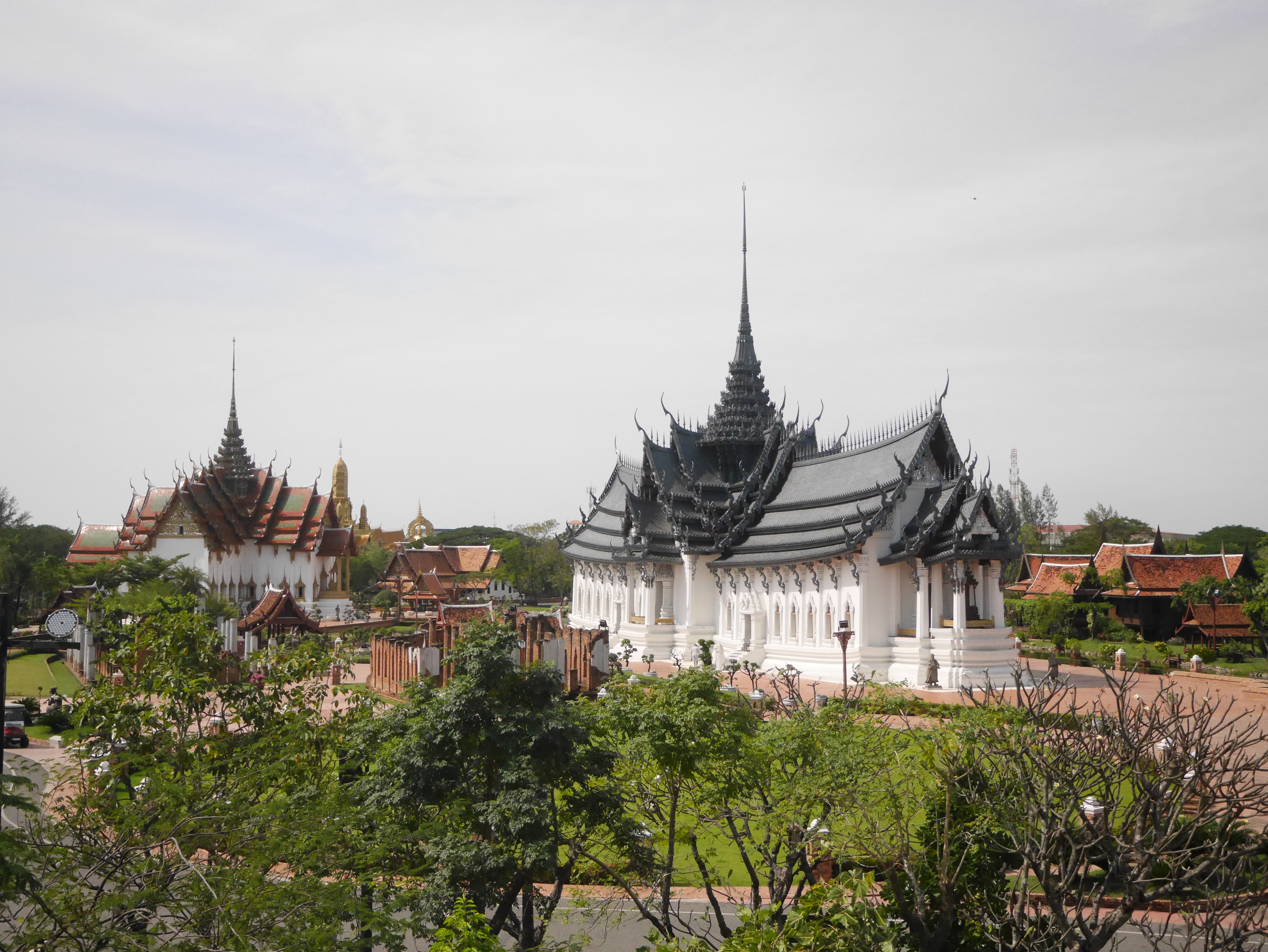
- A view of the Ancient City in Samut Prakan Province, a privately operated open-air museum showcasing Thai architecture and artistic heritage from various historical periods.
- Established: 11 February 1972
- Location: Bangpoo, Samut Prakan, Thailand
- Coordinates: 13°32′21.498″N 100°37′22.515″E
- Type: Outdoor history museum
- Founders: Lek Viriyaphan and Praphai Viriyahphan
- Website: www.muangboranmuseum.com

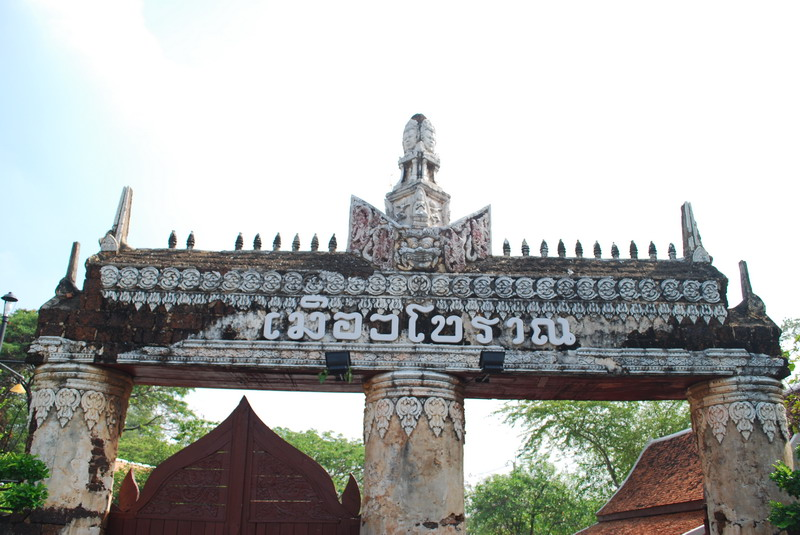
Entrance gate to the park in 2009

Ancient Siam (also known as Ancient City; Thai: เมืองโบราณ, RTGS: Muang Boran) is a museum park featuring replicas of famous Siamese sites. It was constructed by Lek Viriyaphan and occupies over 200 acres (0.81 km^{2}) in the shape of Thailand.

Ancient Siam is often dubbed the world's largest outdoor museum, although it is smaller than Inhotim in Brazil. Located near the Samut Prakan Crocodile Farm in Samut Prakan province, the 320-hectare park features 116 structures representing Thailand's famous monuments and architectural landmarks. The layout of Ancient Siam roughly follows the geographic shape of the kingdom, with monuments positioned in their corresponding real-world locations. Some structures are life-size replicas of existing or former sites, while others are scaled-down versions. Still others are creative designs rather than replicas of any specific historical structure.

The replicas were constructed with the assistance of experts from the National Museum to ensure historical accuracy. Notable reconstructions include the former Grand Palace of Ayutthaya (destroyed during the Burmese invasion of 1767), Phimai Sanctuary in Nakhon Ratchasima, and Phra Viharn on the Cambodian border.

== History ==
Ancient City Waterfall

Lek Viriyaphan was interested in art since childhood, which inspired him to establish the Ancient City. Initially, he intended to build a Thai map-shaped golf course where miniatures of important national ancient sites were placed, which aimed to serve tourism and education purposes only.

Lek started doing research on the establishment of the Ancient City. He found that many ancient sites had been left in decay. Thus, he changed the concept of the Ancient City from being a tourism attraction and relaxation to an open-air museum for educational purposes to benefit newer generations who would be proud of their national heritage.

Lek continually created artwork in the Ancient City as well as the Sanctuary of Truth in Pattaya and the Erawan Museum in Samut Prakan until the end of his life on 17 November 2000.

=== Significant events ===
King Bhumibol Adulyadej (Rama IX) and Queen Sirikit visited the Ancient City (Muang Boran) on two occasions. Their first visit took place in 1971 as a private visit, accompanied by all of their royal children. On 11 February 1972, at 17:00, the King and Queen again visited the Ancient City, accompanied by Queen Elizabeth II and the Duke of Edinburgh. The royal party was received by the Ancient City's committee, led by Praphai Viriyahphan, and subsequently toured major historic sites and monuments within the Ancient City by royal vehicle.

In 2006, America's Next Top Model, Season 6, the reality show from the US, led the contestants to the finals by using the Pavilion of the Saint as a runway. It was a model platform that was the largest in the show's history. In the area, the Sanphet castle model was the place where the winner was announced.

On 29 September 2009, during the Thai–Cambodian border dispute, a group of 500 members of the People's Alliance for Democracy led by Veera Somkwamkid traveled to the Ancient City to read a statement on behalf of the "Alliance Network for Reclaiming Thai Territory," calling for the return of Thai territory around Preah Vihear Temple to Thailand.

== Architecture by timeline ==
The Ancient City displays significant architectural achievements from different eras. They are arranged chronologically.

- Pre-historical
- Dvaravati (11th – 16th centuries BE)
- Srivijaya (13th – 18th BE)
- Angkor (16th – 18th BE)
- Lanna (16th – 25th BE)
- Lan Xang (16th – 21st BE)
- Haripuñjaya (17th – 19th BE)
- Sukhothai (17th – 20th BE)
- Uthong (17th – 20th BE)
- Ayutthaya (19th – 24th BE)
- Thonburi (24th BE)
- Rattanakosin (25th BE)

== List of replicas ==
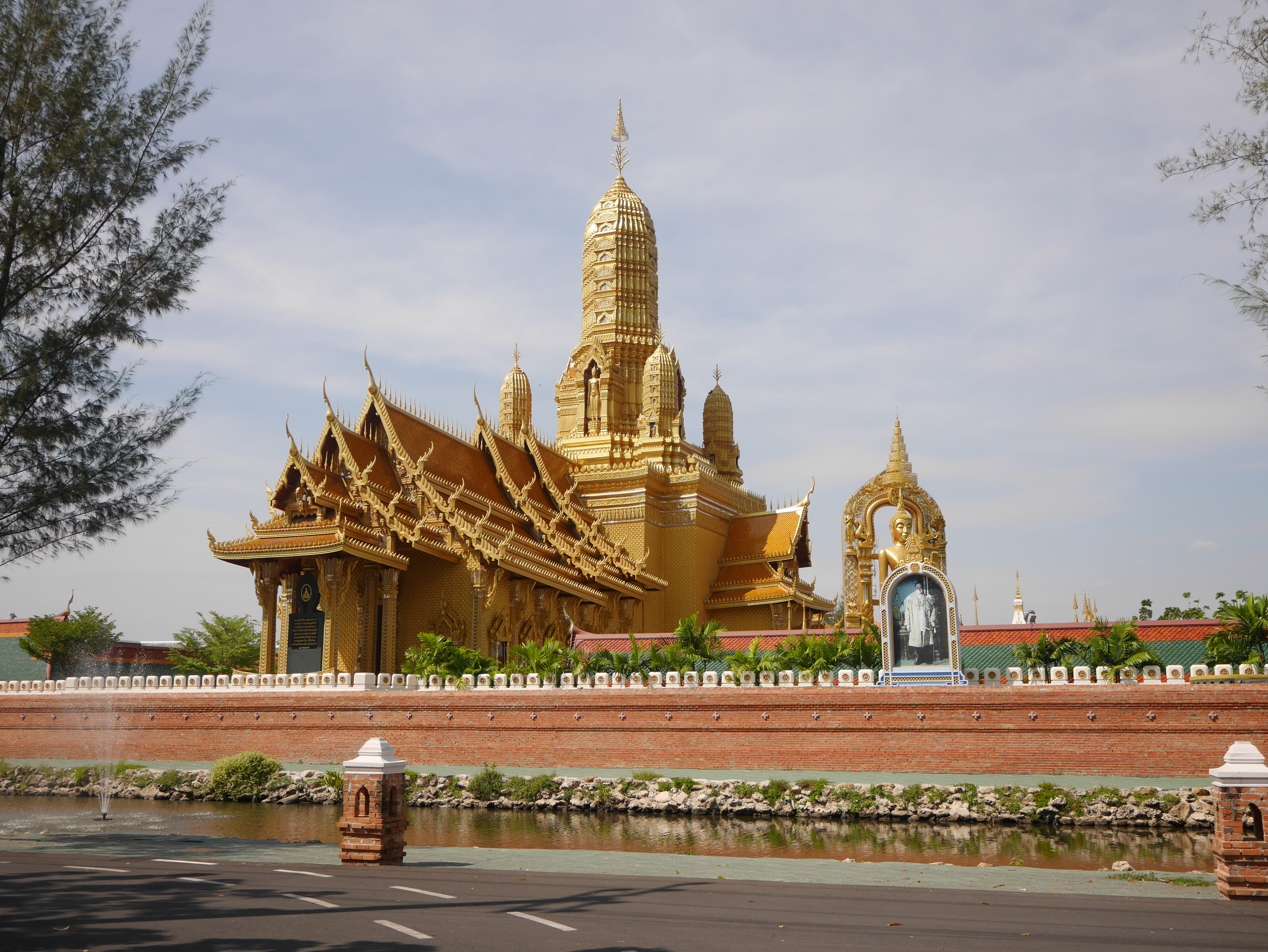
The Great Hall of Vajradhamma — This principal vihara enshrines the 28 Buddhas of the past together with ten future Buddhas. Its surrounding precinct includes related sacred monuments such as the Twelve Zodiac Chedis, the birth-year chedis, and the Uppatasanti Chedi.

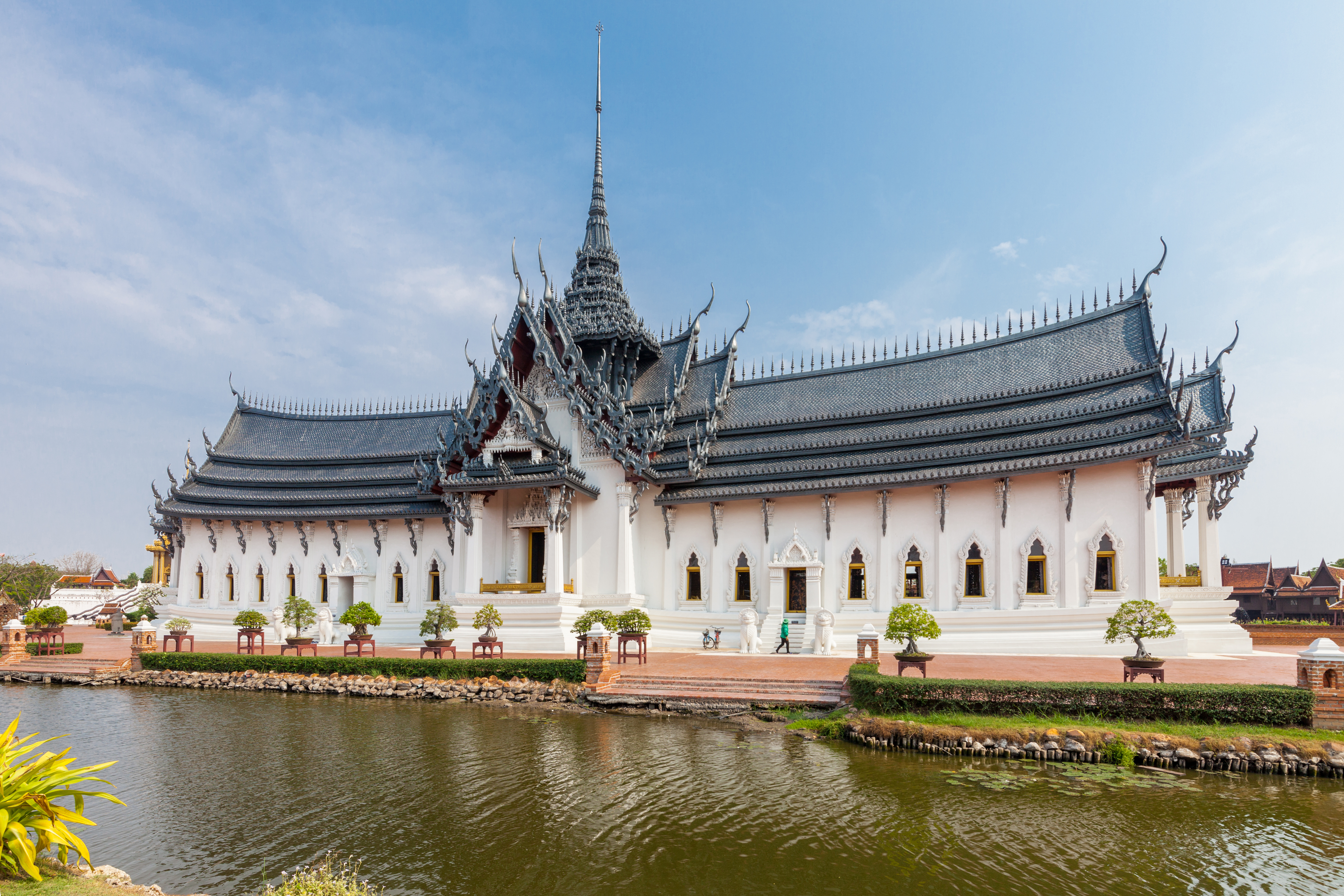
This reconstruction of the Sanphet Prasat Throne Hall is based on archaeological evidence and historical research. The original building served as the principal audience hall and venue of major royal ceremonies in the Ayutthaya period, symbolizing royal authority and the former glory of the Ayutthaya Kingdom.

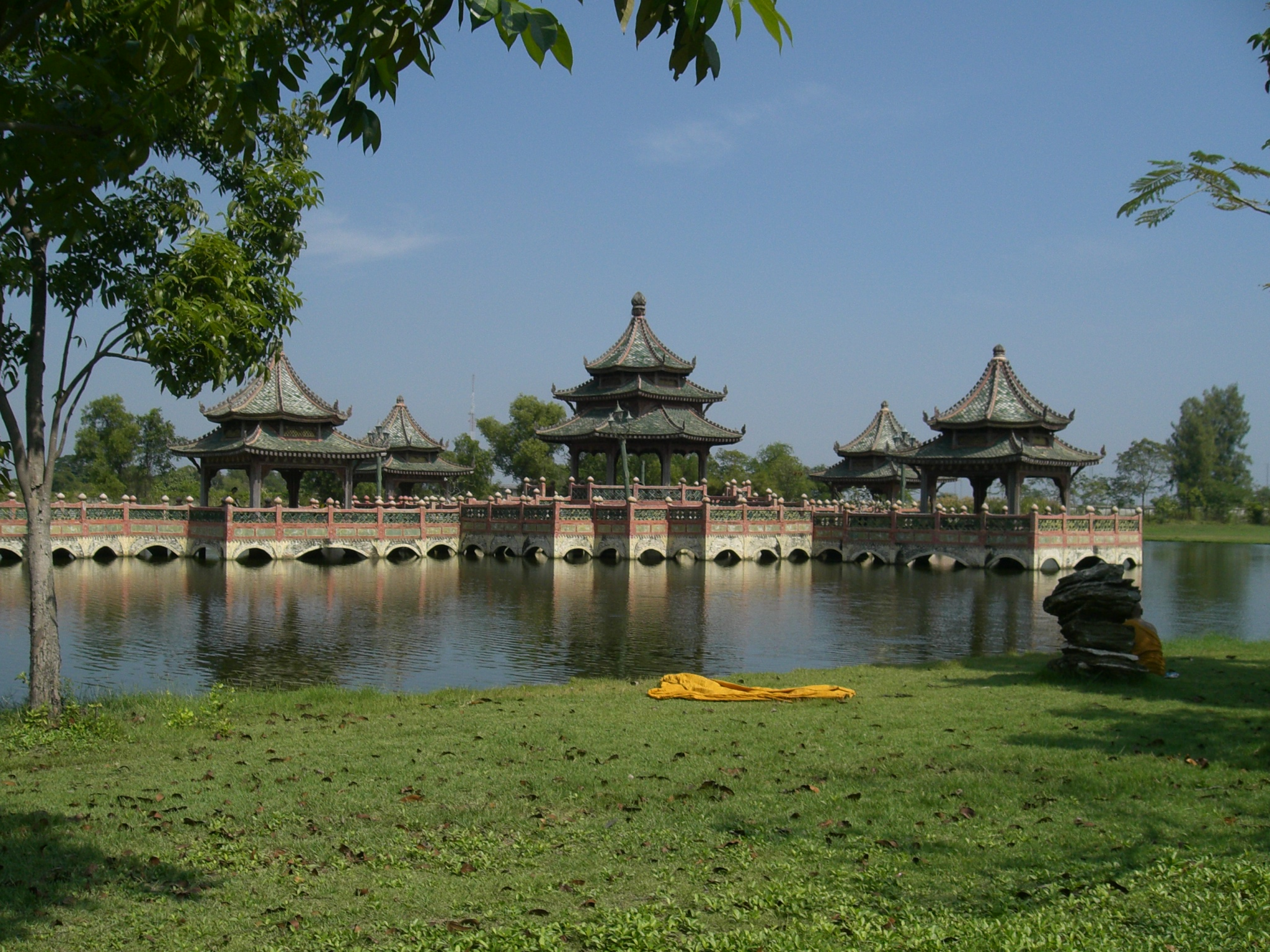
The Sala of Ramayana, one of the grand open pavilions built over a pond and traditionally used as a public and ceremonial space. The pavilion is named after the Ramayana epic, which is depicted in mural paintings on its interior walls.

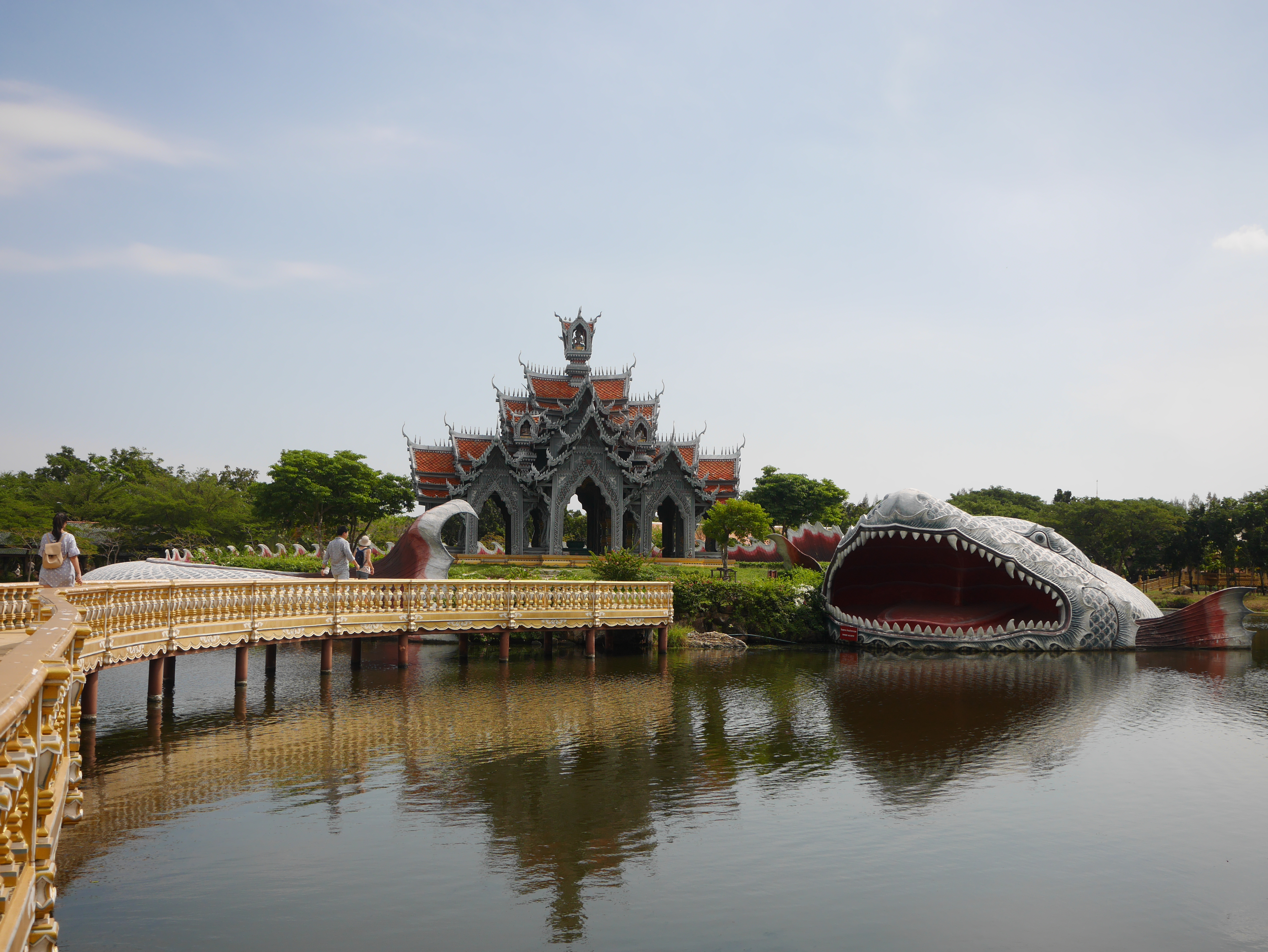
Sumeru Mountain is modeled on mural paintings at Wat Yai Intharam in Chonburi Province. The structure interprets the cosmology of the Buddhist treatise Trai Phum Phra Ruang in architectural form, reflecting pre-modern conceptions of the universe.

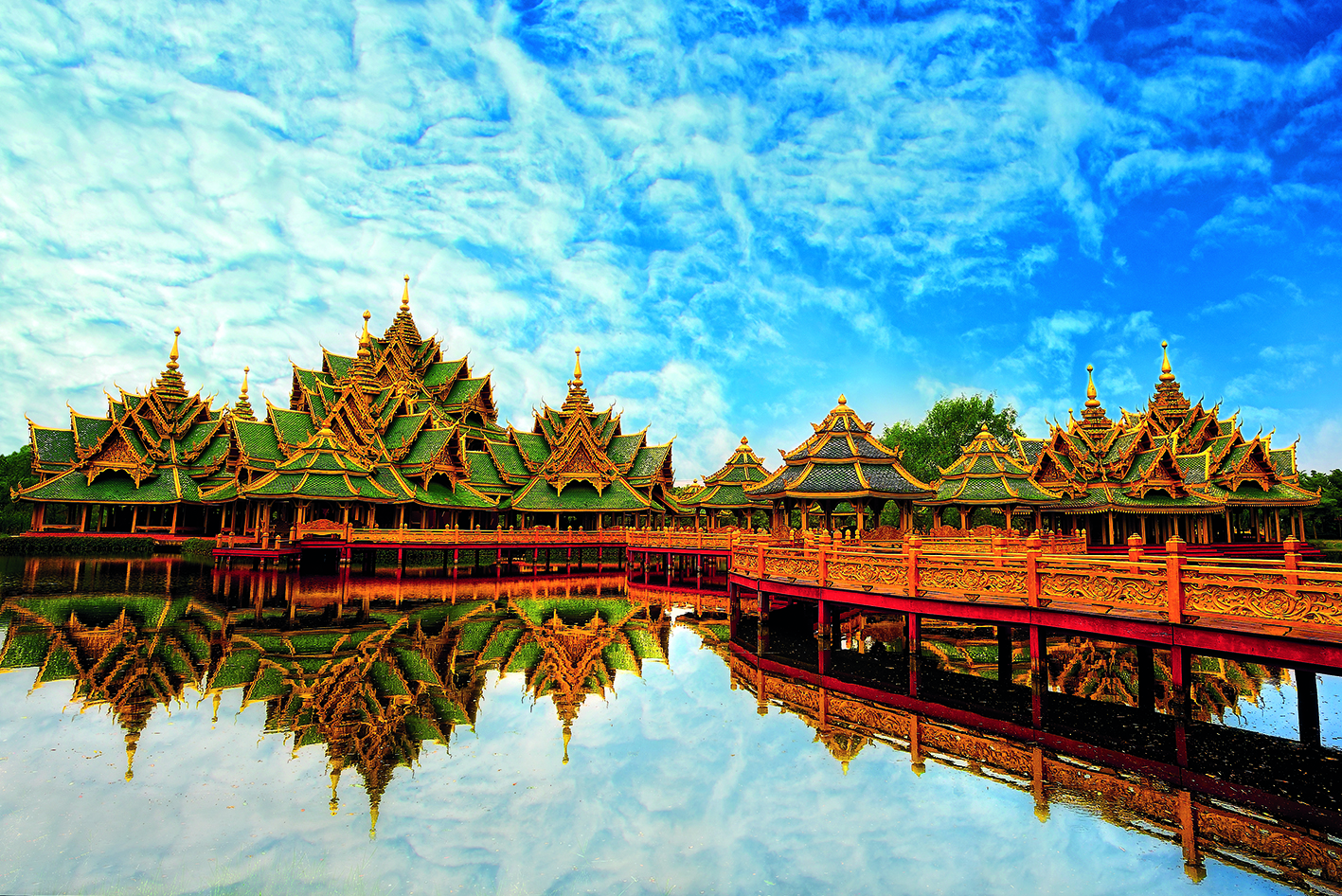
The Pavilion of the Enlightened embodies Mahayana Buddhist teachings on the plurality of paths to spiritual cultivation, illustrating how individuals of differing moral conduct and spiritual merit can all attain enlightenment and reach Nirvana.

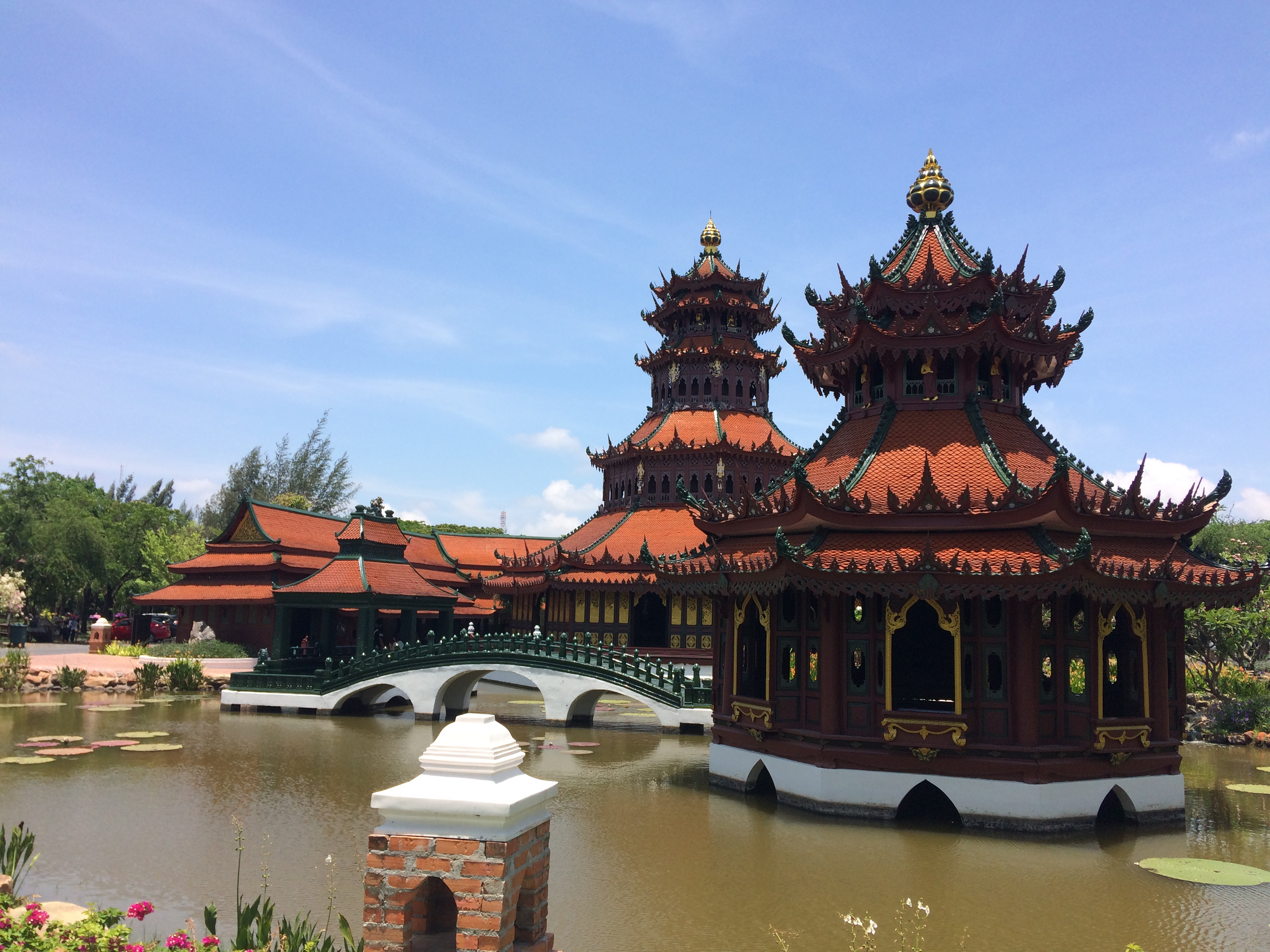
The Phra Kaew Pavilion combines Chinese and Ayutthaya-period Thai architectural forms. It is thought to represent a Buddha hall in the royal palace at Ayutthaya and has been reconstructed at Ancient City from depictions on carved wooden cabinet doors of the Ayutthaya period.

=== Northern Region ===
Northern Thai (Lanna) architecture is known for its distinct regional characteristics, reflected in temple design, decorative elements, and local religious traditions. The replicas in this section present examples of Lanna-style structures and monuments, illustrating both shared features with central Thai (Siamese) culture and regional variations.

- Chedi Chet Yod (The Seven-Spired Pagoda)
- Ho Kham
- Noen Prasat
- Pavilion of Brahma Vihara
- Phra Lo Garden
- Phra That Chom Kitti
- The Bench of Public Appeals
- The Chedi of Cham Thewi
- The Grand Hall of Wat Maha That
- The Lotus-Bud Tower
- The Main Chedi of Wat Maha That
- The Mondop Housing Footprints of the Lord Buddha
- The Northern Thai Village
- The Water Hall
- The Wihan at Sa-Moeng
- The Wihan at Wat Phumin
- The Wihan of Wat Chiang Khong
- Wat Chong Kham

=== Northeastern Region ===
Northeastern Thailand, commonly known as Isaan, covers a large area of the country and has a predominantly seasonal (monsoon) climate, with prolonged dry periods in many areas. As a major agricultural region, local religious practices and festivals have often been associated with seasonal cycles, including traditions connected with rain and fertility. Architecture in this region reflects influences from neighboring areas, including Khmer and Lao traditions, as well as earlier Dvaravati-period forms.

- An Image of Hindu Deity with a Mitred Crown
- Dharma Center
- Dvaravati Wihan
- Ku Khu Maha That
- Nang Usa's Look-Out Tower
- Phra Chedi Si Song Rak
- Phra That Bang Phuan
- Phra That Narai Cheng Weng
- Phra That Phanom
- Phra That Ya Khu
- Pra That Choeng Chum
- Prasat Hin Nong Ku
- Prasat phra Wihan (Preah Vihear)
- Prasat Sikhoraphum
- The Buddha Image Being Protected by the Naga
- The Churning of the Ocean
- The Garden of Pha Daeng-Nang Ai
- The Garden of Sacred Stupa
- The Garden of the Prince of the Golden Conch
- The Lan Chang Styled Scripture Repository and Wihan
- The Octagonal Sala
- The Phanom Rung Sanctuary
- The Phimai Sanctuary
- The Prang at Si Thep
- The Reclining Buddha
- The Shrines
- The Stupa of Wat Phra That Sam Muen
- The Thai-Songdam Village

=== Central Region ===
The Central region is closely associated with the Chao Phraya River, which has long served as a major waterway and a focal point of settlement, trade, and political power. From the Ayutthaya Kingdom through the Rattanakosin period, the river and its basin played a central role in the development of Thai society and culture. The replicas in this section present sites and structures connected with the history and cultural landscape of central Thailand.

- A Monk's Residence
- An Image of Hindu Deity with a Mitred Crown
- Dusit Maha Prasat Palace
- Khao Yai National Park
- Khun Chang-Khun Phaen Garden
- Khun Phaen House
- Monument of Krom Phra Ratchawang Boworn Maha Surasinghanat
- Prang Sam Yod
- Prasat Sadok Kok Thom
- Rattanakosin Dwelling
- Sanphet Prasat Palace
- The Ancient Theatrical Pavilion
- The Audience Hall of Thon Buri
- The Bell Tower
- The Buddha Image of Dvaravati Period
- The Chom Thong Palace Hall
- The Courage of the People of Bang Rachan
- The Dvaravati House
- The Floating Market
- The Footprint of the Lord Buddha
- The Fortified Wall around Kamphaeng Phet
- The Fruit-shape Tower (Prang Mafuang)
- The Garden of Phra Aphaimani
- The Garden of the Gods
- The Gateway of Wat Pho Prathap Chang
- The Great Battle of Yuthahathi
- The hall of Wat Nimit
- The Kam Yaad Palace Hall
- The Krai Thong Garden
- The Meditation Retreat
- The Old Fort and Wall at Chachoengsao
- The Old Market Town
- The Palace Garden
- The Phra Kaew Pavilion
- The Prang of Wat Chulamanee
- The Ramayana Garden
- The Red Block Building
- The Scripture Repository
- The Shrine Housing the City Pillar
- The Stupa of Phra MahaThat
- The Sukhothai Wihan
- The Thai Hamlet from the Central Plains
- The Tiger King's Palace
- The Wihan at Wat Phra Si Sanphet
- The Wihan at Wat Phrao
- The Wihan of Wat Pho Kao Ton
- Three Pagodas Pass

=== Southern Region ===
Southern Thailand has long been a crossroads of peoples and cultures, shaped by maritime trade and connections across the Malay Peninsula and the wider Indian Ocean world. The region includes communities with diverse linguistic and religious traditions, and its art and architecture reflect a range of influences, including Thai, Malay, Chinese, and South Asian elements. The replicas in this section present examples associated with the cultural landscape of southern Thailand.

- I-Nao Garden
- The Information Pavilion
- The Biographical Exhibition of Founders
- The City Sala
- The City Wall and Gate
- The Manohra Garden
- The Pallava Group Images
- The Royal Stand
- The Stupa of Phra Maha That

=== Suvarnabhumi ===
Suvarnabhumi appears in a range of ancient Indian literary sources and Buddhist texts. The term means "Golden Land", and historical and religious traditions have associated it with different locations across Southeast Asia. In some narratives, Suvarnabhumi is described as a land of wealth and opportunity connected with long-distance travel and trade, including stories of voyages that end in misfortune such as shipwrecks. The Suvarnabhumi zone at the Ancient City is presented as an idealized landscape that reflects these traditions.

- Bodhisattva Avalokitesvara
- Botanical Garden from Thai Literature
- Giant Swing and in Brahmin Temple
- Mondop of Bodhisattva Avalokitesvar (Kuan-Yin)
- Mondop Phra Si Thit
- Pavilion of Recallection
- Pavilion of the Enlightened
- Phra That Mondop
- Sala 24 Katanyu
- Sala Kong-Ming
- Sala of 80 Yogis
- Sala of Ramayana
- Sala of Ten Reincarnations
- Sumeru Mountain
- Thai Sail Ship
- The Public Resting Pavillion
- The Rainbow Bridge
- The Royal Water Course Procession

== See also ==
- Sanctuary of Truth
- Erawan Museum
- List of museums in Thailand
- List of museums and art galleries in Bangkok
