= Wat Phra Kaew =

Buddhist temple in Bangkok, Thailand

- Temple of the Emerald Buddha
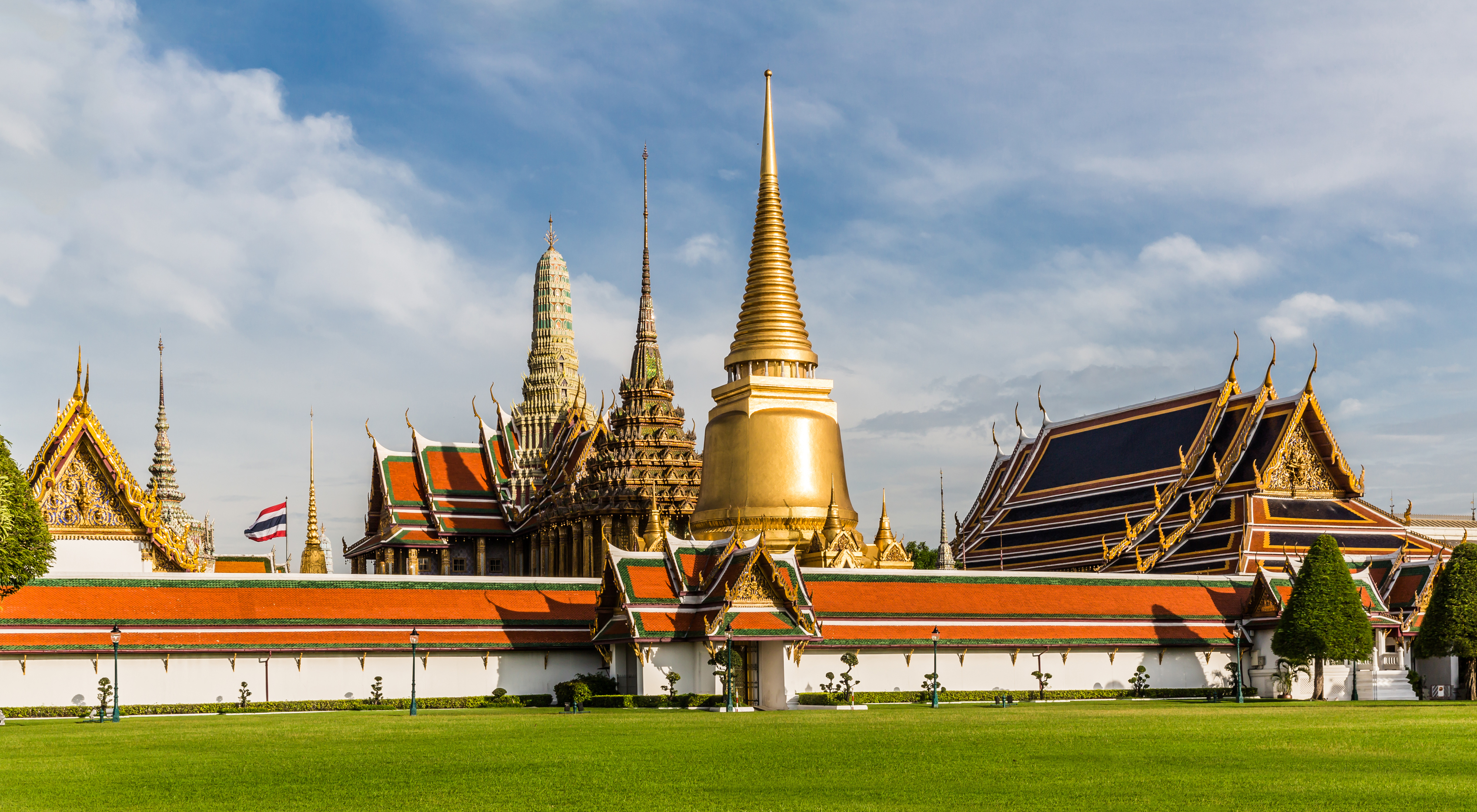
- View from the Outer Court of the Grand Palace

- Location within Bangkok

Religion
- Affiliation: Theravada Buddhism

Location
- Country: Phra Nakhon District, Bangkok, Thailand
- Coordinates: 13°45′5″N 100°29′33″E

Architecture
- Founder: King Rama I
- Completed: 1785; 241 years ago

Wat Phra Kaew (Thai: วัดพระแก้ว, RTGS: Wat Phra Kaeo, pronounced [wát pʰrá(ʔ) kɛ̂ːw]), commonly known in English as the Temple of the Emerald Buddha and officially as Wat Phra Si Rattana Satsadaram, (Note: Thai: วัดพระศรีรัตนศาสดาราม, pronounced [wát pʰrá(ʔ) sǐː rát.tà.ná(ʔ) sàːt.sà.dāː.rāːm].) is regarded as the most sacred Buddhist temple in Thailand. The complex consists of a number of buildings within the precincts of the Grand Palace in the historical centre of Bangkok. It houses the statue of the Emerald Buddha, which is venerated as the country's palladium.

Construction of the temple began in 1783 under the orders of Rama I, the first king of the Chakri dynasty. Since then, each successive king has been personally involved in adding, restoring and embellishing the temple during their reigns as a way of making religious merit and glorifying the dynasty. Many important state and royal ceremonies are held within the temple each year, presided by the king in person and attended by government officials. This makes the temple the nation's preeminent place of worship and a national shrine for the monarchy and the state. Throughout the years, each king has donated sacred and valuable objects to the temple, making it a treasury as well.

The temple complex comprises various buildings for specific religious purposes built in a variety of Thai architectural styles, while still adhering to the traditional principles of Thai religious architecture.

== History ==
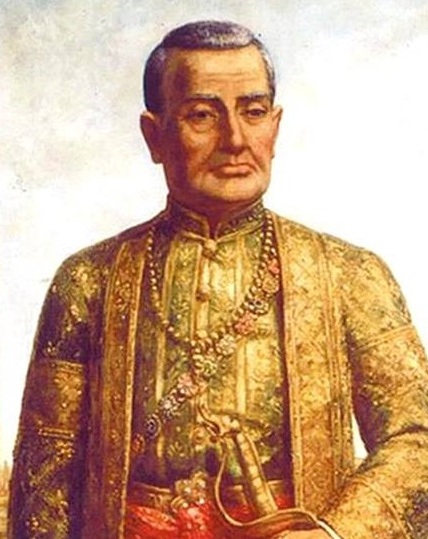
King Rama I founded the Chakri dynasty in 1782; he began construction of the Wat Phra Kaew a year later.

When King Rama I made Bangkok the capital city of the Rattanakosin Kingdom on 6 April 1782, a suitable royal palace and temple was needed to legitimize the new Chakri dynasty. The King's reason for moving the capital city was a desire to distance himself from the previous regime of King Taksin, whom he had replaced as king of Siam. The old royal palace in Thonburi was small and sandwiched between two temples; Wat Arun and Wat Tai Talat, prohibiting further expansion.

Rama I established the Grand Palace on the eastern bank of the Chao Phraya River, within the fortified city area now known as Rattanakosin Island. Traditionally, an area was always set aside within the palace compound for the construction of a royal temple or chapel for the king and the royal family's personal use. The temple (or wat) would have all the features of any regular Buddhist temple except for living quarters for monks. Surrounded on all sides by a wall, the temple would be a distinct space for worship separate from the king's residential space. As the temple would be built within the palace of the king, no monks would be lodged there. Instead, monks from various other temples would be invited to perform rituals and then leave. This was the case with Wat Mahathat, a royal chapel within the grounds of the royal palace at Sukhothai, Wat Phra Si Sanphet at Ayutthaya and Wat Arun in Thonburi. Wat Phra Si Sanphet, built next to the royal palace of the king of Ayutthaya, particularly influenced the building of this new temple.

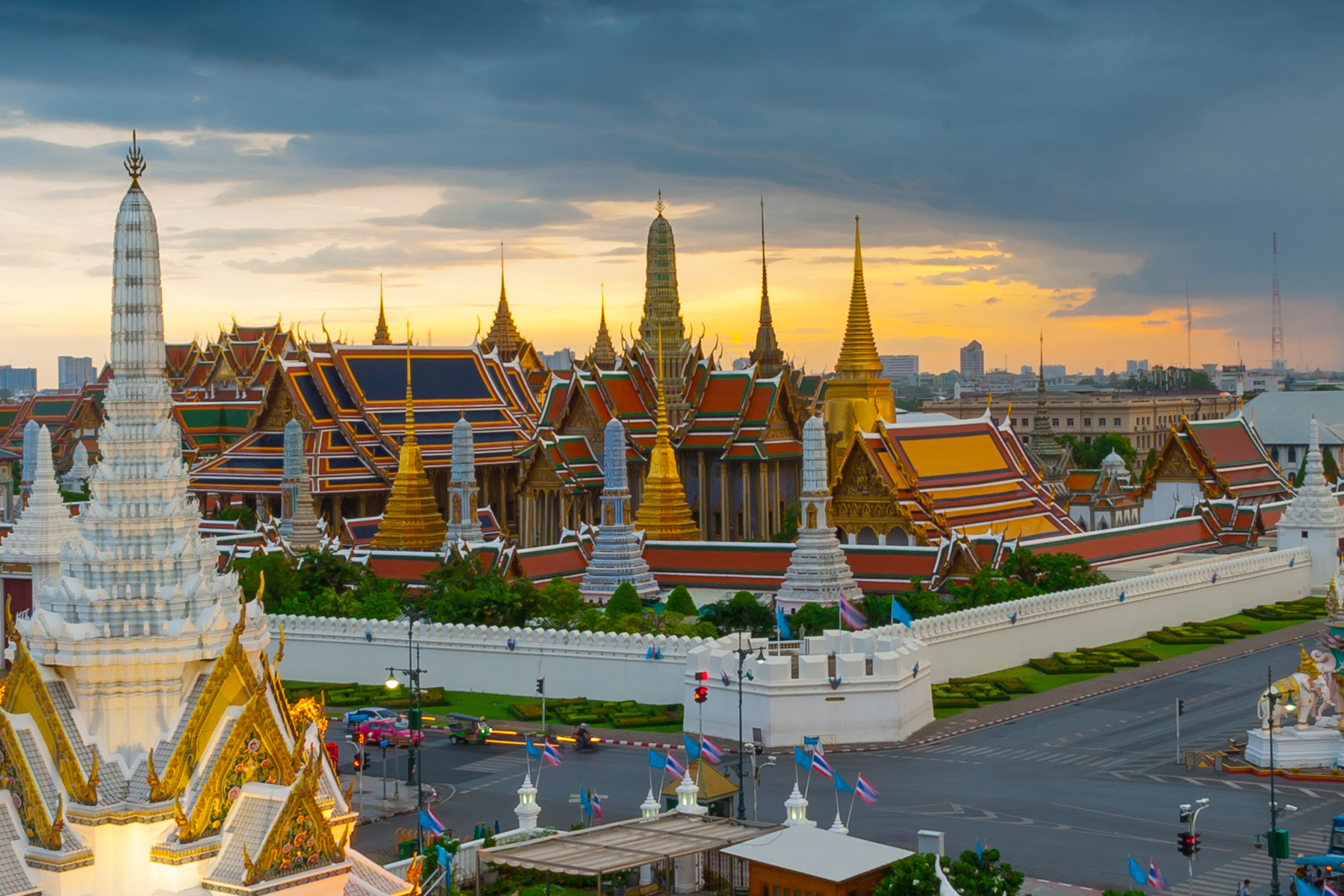
Wat Phra Kaew complex viewed from outside the walls of the Grand Palace

Construction on the temple began in 1783. The temple was given the formal name Wat Phra Si Rattana Satsadaram, meaning "the temple containing the beautiful jewel of the monastery of the divine teacher". The temple's main hall was the first building within the entire palace compound that was completed in masonry, while the king's residence was still made of wood. The temple complex was built in the northeastern corner of the Outer Court of the Grand Palace. In February/March 1785, the Emerald Buddha was transported with great ceremony from its former home at Wat Arun in Thonburi across the river to the Rattanakosin side and installed at its present position. (Note: The date is recorded in the Rattanakosin Royal Chronicle as Monday, 14th waning moon, 4th lunar month, year of the dragon, Chulasakkarat 1146, which is erroneous as that lunar date falls on a Wednesday. A later Fine Arts Department publication corrects this to 5th waning moon, which corresponds to 28 February 1785. However, many sources report an incorrect date of 22 March 1784.) In 1786 Rama I gave Bangkok an official name as the new capital of Siam. Translated, the name mentions the temple and the Emerald Buddha itself: "The City of Angels, Great City, the Residence of the Emerald Buddha, the Great City of God Indra, Ayutthaya, the World Endowed with Nine Precious Gems, the Happy City Abounding in Great Royal Palaces which Resemble the Heavenly Abode Wherein Dwell the Reincarnated Gods, a City Given by Indra and Built by Vishvakarman".

The temple has undergone many different periods of major renovations, beginning with the reigns of Rama III and Rama IV. Rama III started the rebuilding in 1831 for the 50th anniversary of Bangkok in 1832, while Rama IV's restoration was completed by Rama V in time for the Bangkok centennial celebrations in 1882. Further restoration took place under the reigns of Rama VII during Bangkok's 150th Anniversary in 1932 and of Rama IX for the 200th Anniversary in 1982.

As the royal temple, Wat Phra Kaew continues to serve as the site of Buddhist religious rites undertaken by the king and the royal family, including major events such as coronations, royal ordinations and investiture of the supreme patriarch. The king or an appointee also attends annual ceremonies marking the major Buddhist holidays Visakha Puja, Asalha Puja and Magha Puja at the temple. Three times a year, the gold garments of the Emerald Buddha image are changed in a royal ceremony marking the change of the seasons. Annual rites are also held on Chakri Memorial Day, the Royal Ploughing Ceremony, the King's Birthday and Songkran (the traditional Thai new year). On most other days, the temple, together with certain areas of the Grand Palace, is open to visitors, and they are among the country's best known tourist attractions.

Map of Wat Phra Kaew
1. Ubosot and the Emerald Buddha; 2. Ratchakoramanuson Hall; 3. Phra Photithat Phiman; 4. Ratchaphongsanuson Hall; 5. Twelve sala 6. Chao Mae Kuan Im; 7. The Hermit; 8. Than Phaithi; 9. Prasat Phra Thep Bidon; 10. Phra Mondop; 11. Phra Si Rattana Chedi; 12. Phra Suwannachedi; 13. Monument to Rama I, II and III; 14. Monument to Rama IV; 15. Monument to Rama V 16. Monument to Rama VI, VII, VIII and IX; 17. Phra Chedi Songkhrueang; 18. Model of Angkor Wat; 19. Mythological figures 20. Southern porch 21. Western porch 22. Phra Sawet Kudakhan Wihan Yot; 23. Ho Phra Khanthararat; 24. Phra Mondop Yot Prang	25. Bell Tower; 26. Ho Phra Nak; 27. Ho Phra Monthiantham; 28. Row of eight prang 29. Ramakien gallery 30. Gate No. 1, Koei Sadet (front); 31. Gate No. 2, Na Wua; 32. Gate No. 3, Phra Sri Ratanasatsada; 33. Gate No. 4, Hermit; 34. Gate No. 5, Koei Sadet (rear); 35. Gate No. 6, Sanam Chai; 36. Gate No. 7, Wihan Yot
1. Suriyaphop; 2. Intarachit; 3. Mangkonkan; 4. Wirunhok; 5. Thotsakhirithon; 6. Thotsakhiriwan; 7. Chakkrawat; 8. Atsakanmala; 9. Thotsakan; 10. Sahatsadecha; 11. Maiyarap; 12. Wirunchambang

== Ubosot ==
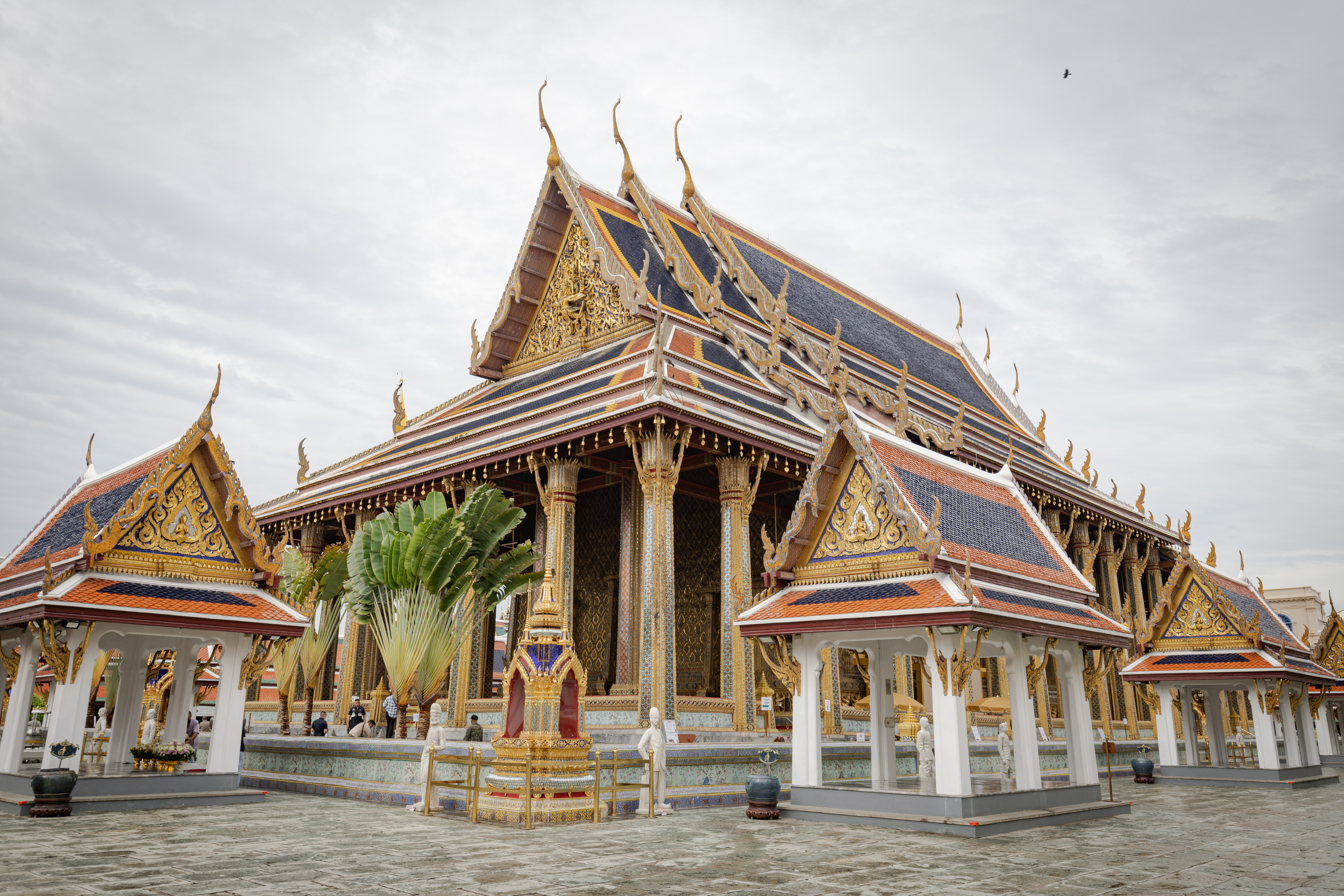
The Ubosot of Wat Phra Kaew is surrounded by a low wall, eight bai sema shrines and twelve pavilions.

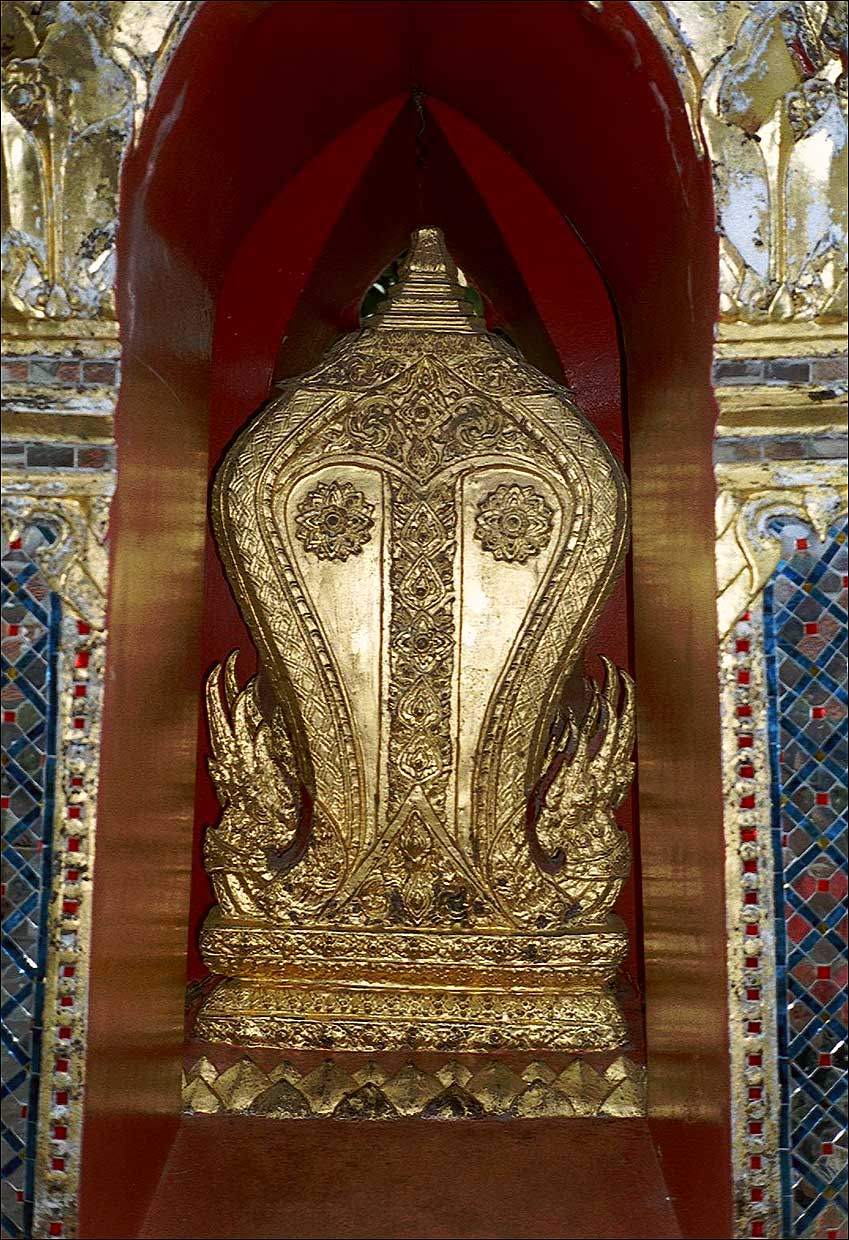
Double gold-leaf bai sema stones.

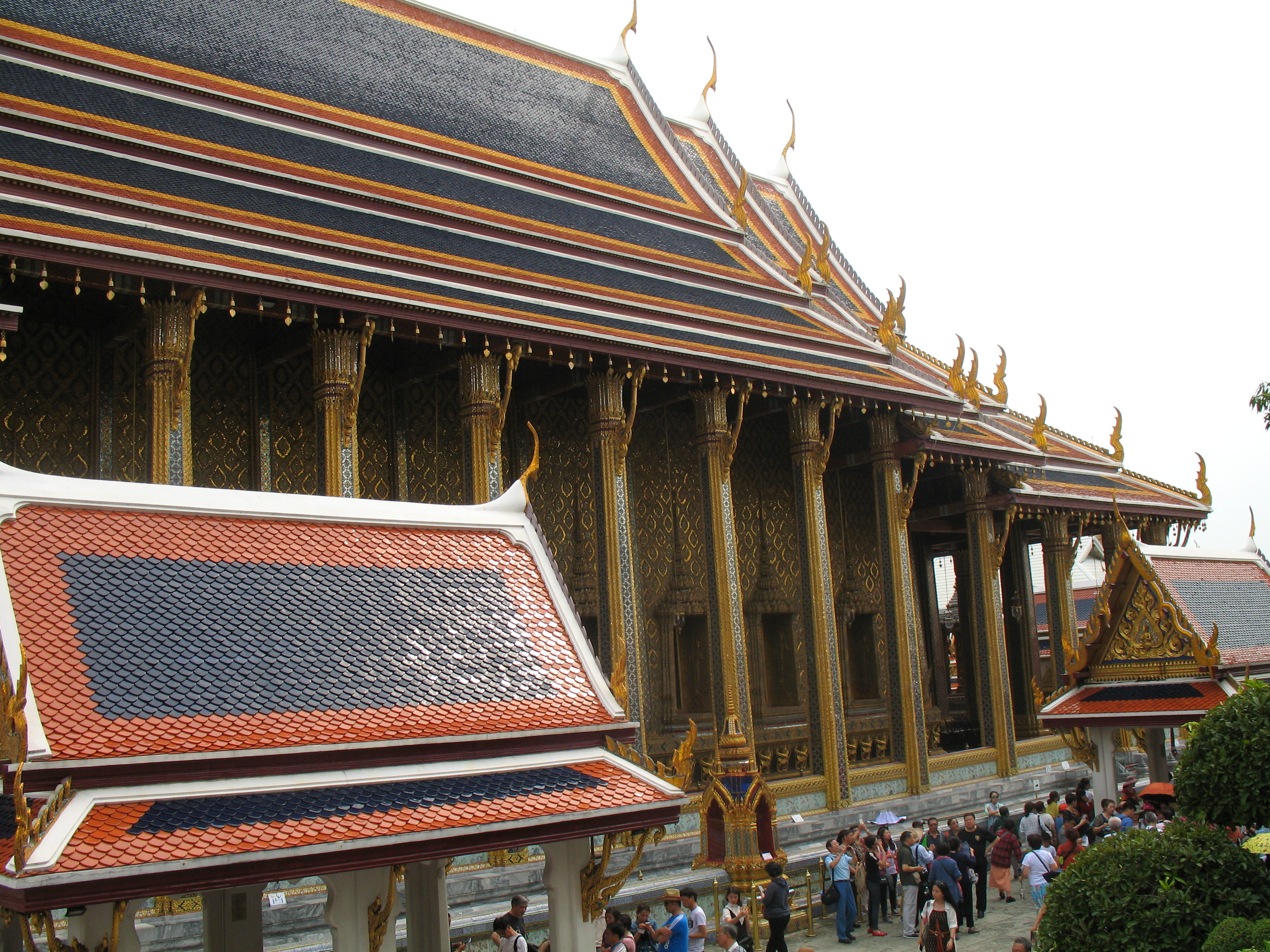
Crowds outside the ubosot, which houses the Emerald Buddha.

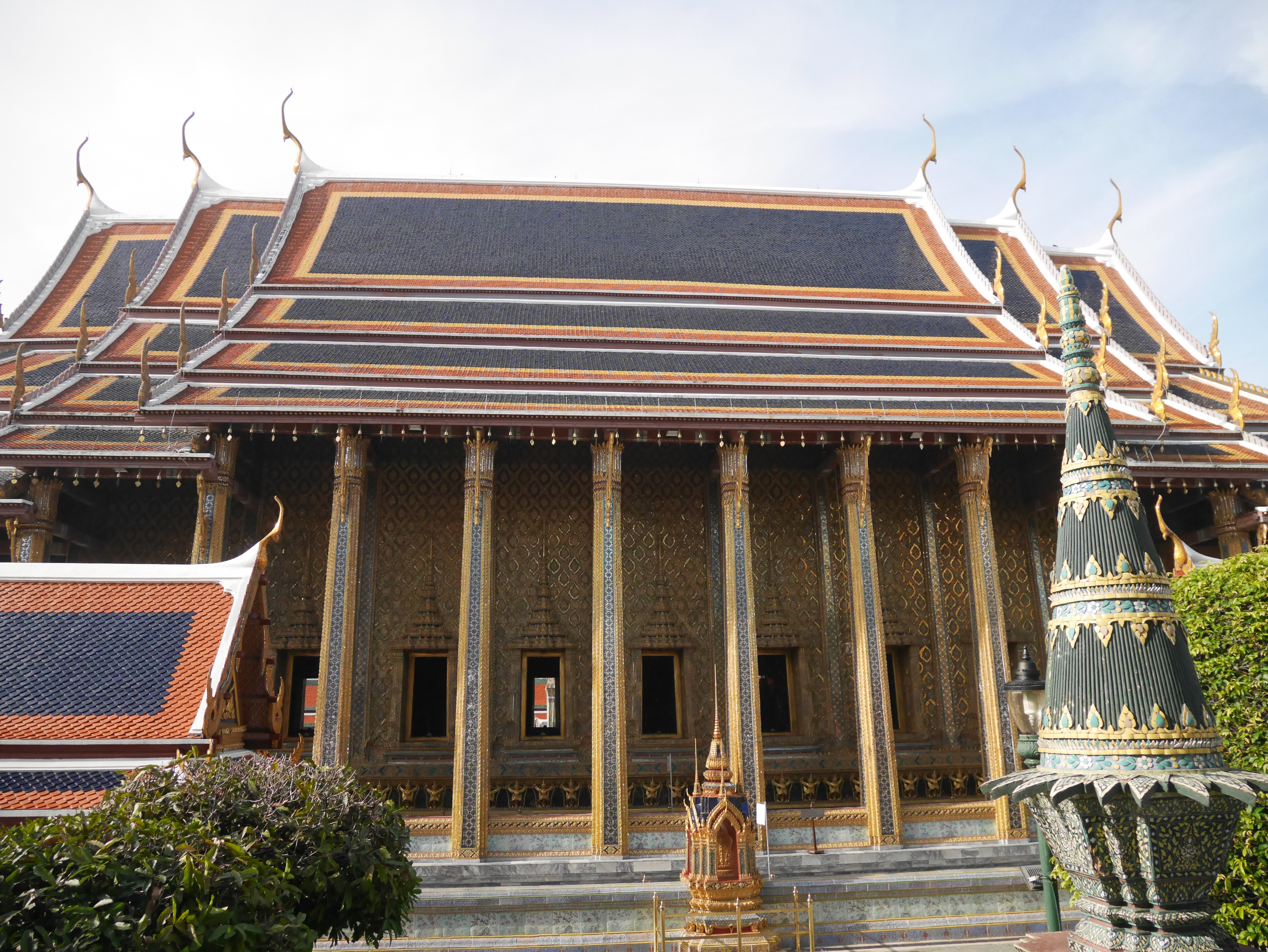
Side view of the ubosot, featuring its gilded columns and intricate mosaic decoration.

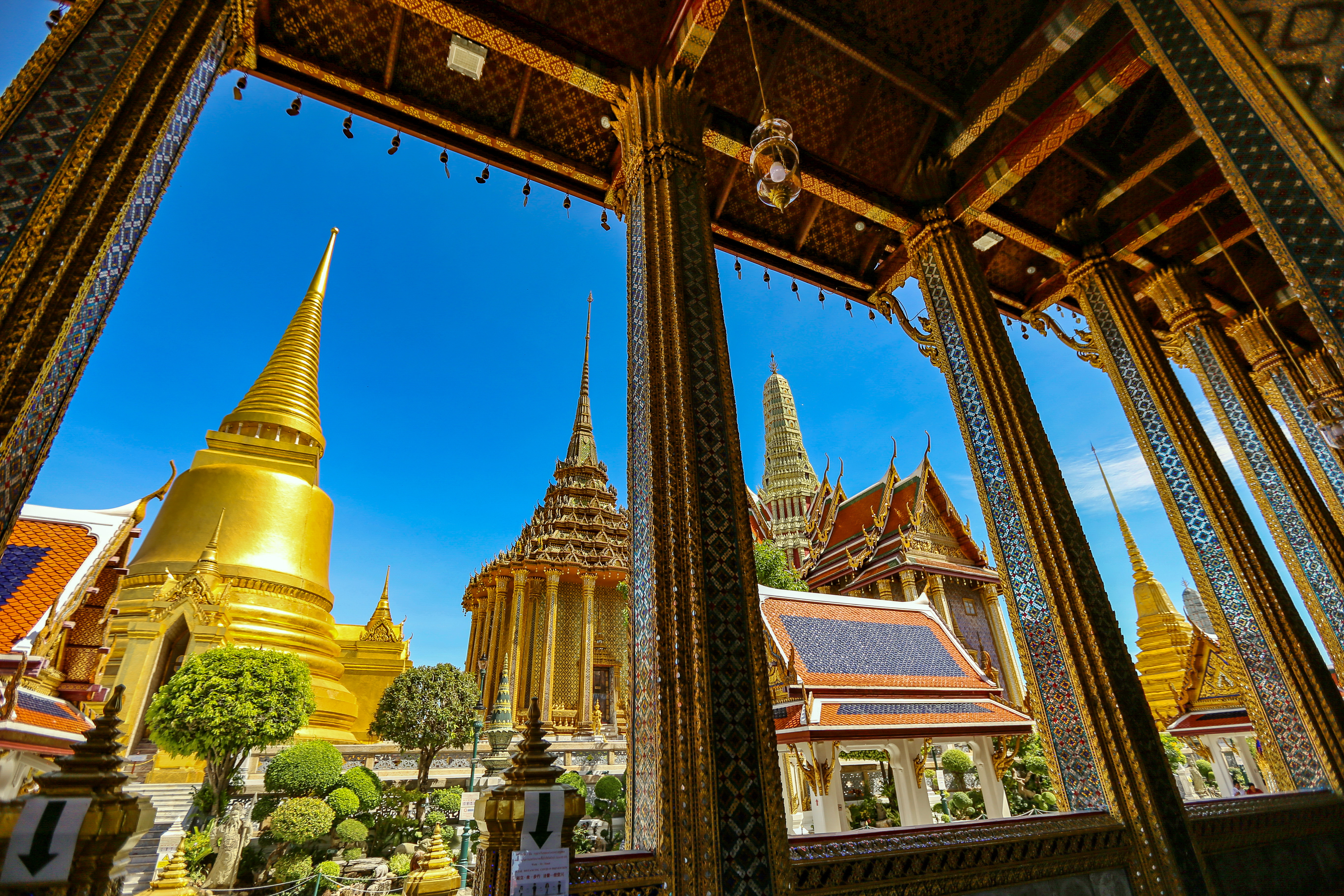
View from the ubosot, framed by gilded columns, overlooking the temple complex.

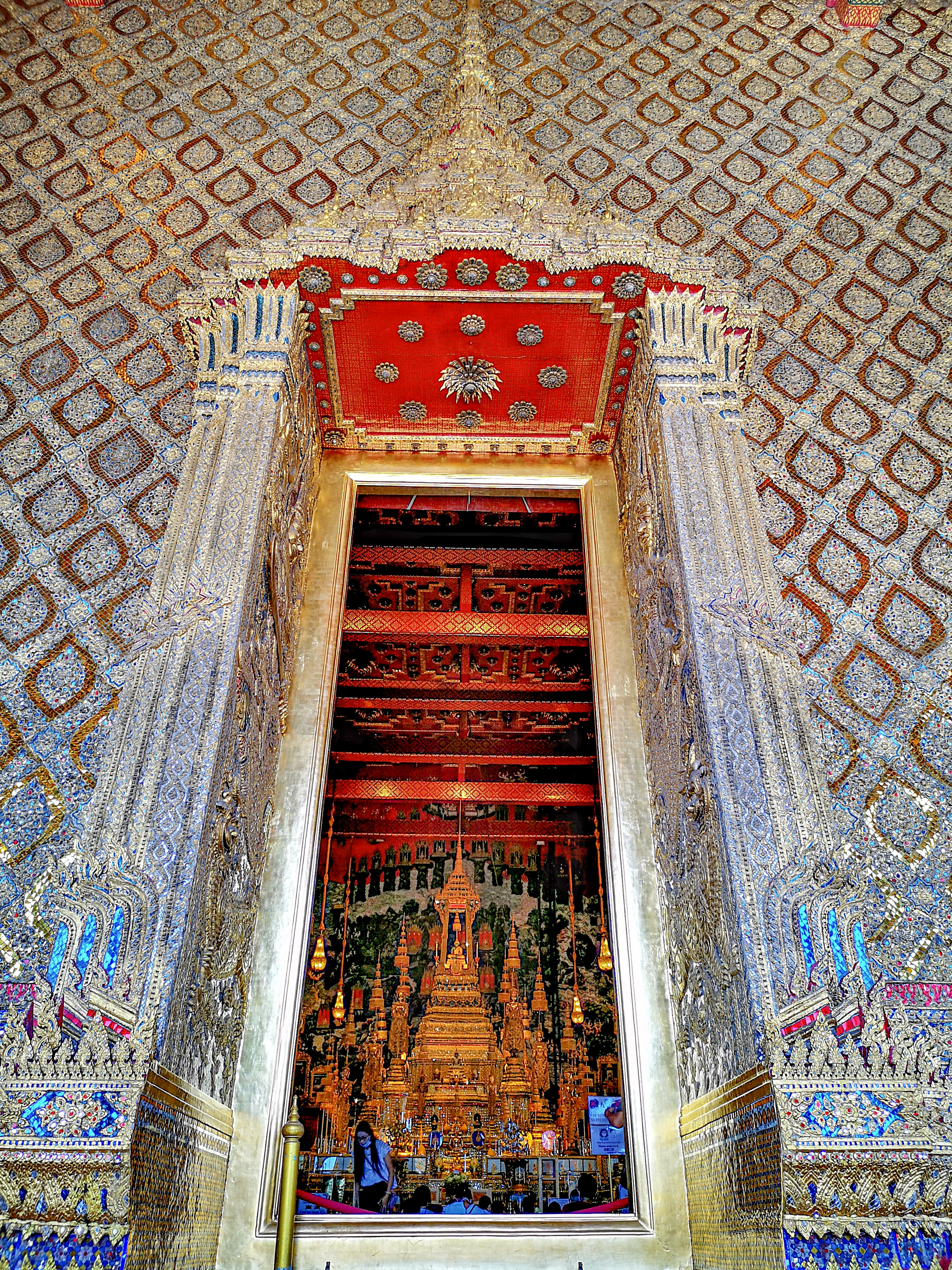
Ornate doorway of the ubosot, which houses the Emerald Buddha.

The Phra Ubosot (พระอุโบสถ), or ordination hall, occupies almost the entire southern part of the temple complex. The Ubosot is surrounded by a low wall; this separation emphasises the building's sacred nature. The wall contains eight small pavilions with tall spires, each housing a double bai sema stone covered in gold leaf. In Thai religious architecture, such stones traditionally denote a sacred boundary within which the ordination of monks could be carried out.

Construction of the Ubosot began during the reign of Rama I in 1783; as such, the building is one of the oldest structures within the temple. The Ubosot was built to house the Buddha image known as the Emerald Buddha, which the King had captured from Vientiane, Laos, in 1779. Previously, the image was housed in the Emerald Buddha hall in the Wat Arun complex on the Thonburi side of the Chao Phraya River. The Emerald Buddha was ceremonially installed at its present position in the temple in February/March 1785. In 1831, Rama III ordered a major renovation of the exterior of the Ubosot.

=== Exterior ===
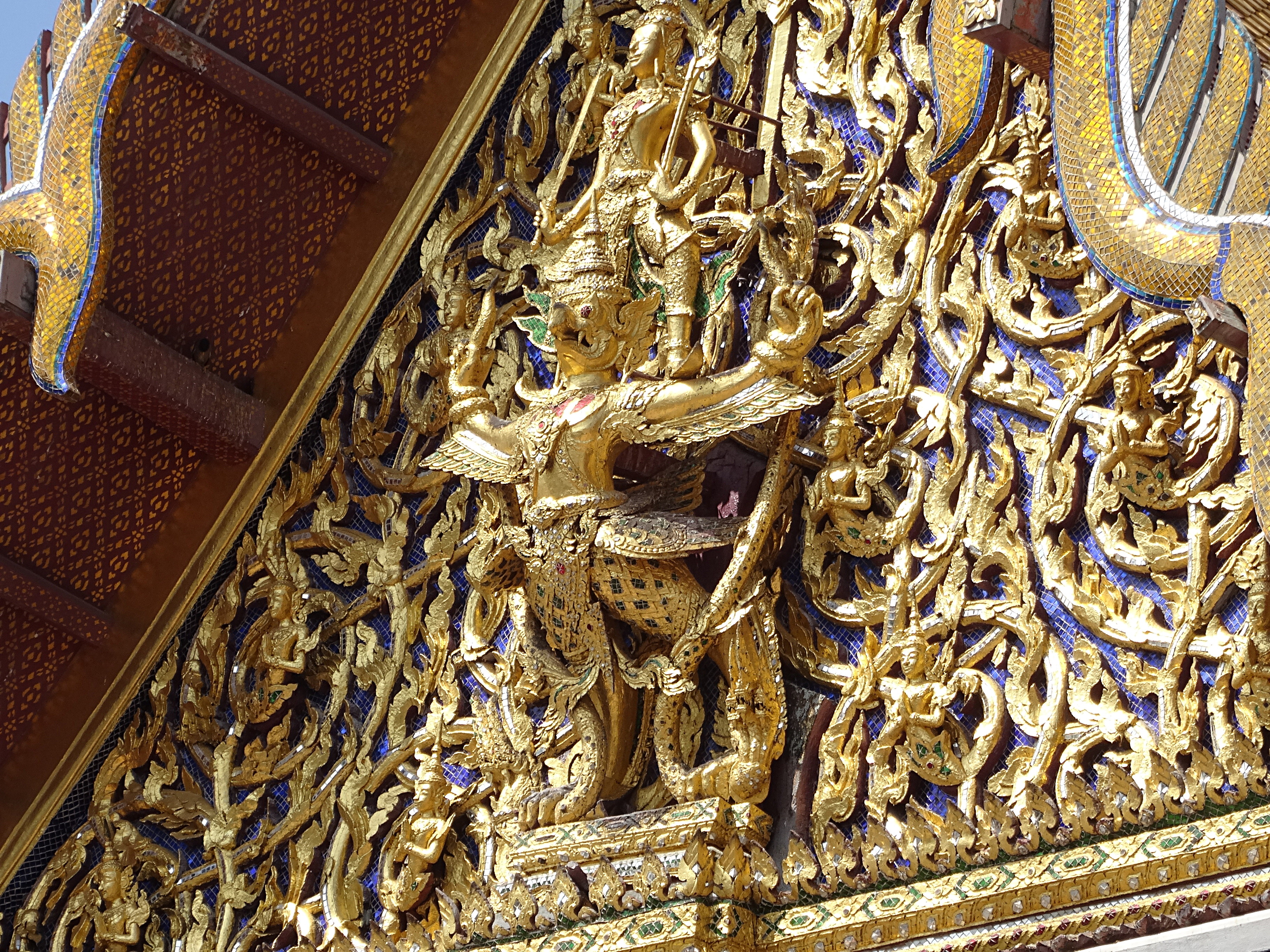
One of the pediments of the Ubosot, depicting the god Narayana on the back of a Garuda

The Ubosot is rectangular and single-storeyed, with the main entrance on the eastern end. The hall is surrounded by columns supporting a massive roof. On the eastern and western ends of the hall, an extended porch projects outwards with additional columns. The roof is covered with blue, yellow and orange glazed tiles. The pediments at either end of the roof depict the Hindu god Narayana (or Vishnu) mounted on the back of a Garuda (a mythical half-man, half-bird), with the latter holding in both hands the tails of two Naga serpents. The figure of the god is a traditional symbol of kingship and has been adopted by Thai kings as their symbol since ancient times. The vahana (or vehicle) of the god is the mythical Garuda. A creature of great strength and loyalty, the Garuda has been adopted as the national emblem of Thailand. Hung along the eaves of the roof are hundreds of small, gilded wind-bells with Bodhi-leaf sails. The brackets protruding from the top of the columns to support the roof take the form of Nagas with their heads pointing downwards. This commemorates the legend of Mucalinda, the King of the Nagas, who protected the Buddha from rain before he achieved Enlightenment. The Ubosot is surrounded by forty-eight square columns, each with twelve indented corners. Each column is decorated with glass mosaic and gilded gold edges; the capitals depict lotus petals covered in coloured glass mosaic.

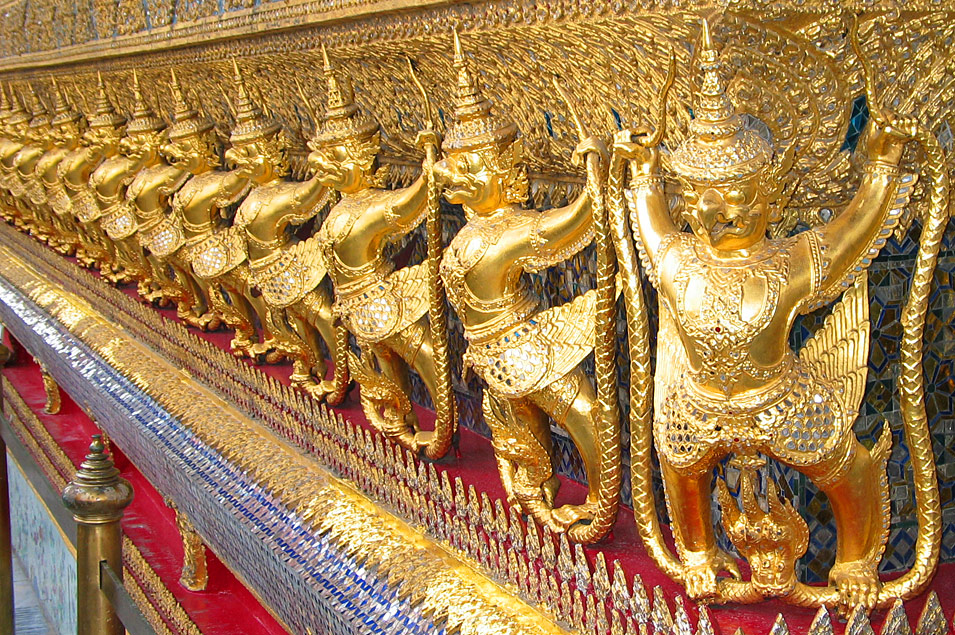
The central base of the Ubosot is decorated with a golden row of 112 Garudas.

The exterior walls of the Ubosot are covered in traditional Thai decorations made of gold leaf and coloured glass. Built on a high base of several layers, the hall is raised high above the ground and must be entered through a stairway. The lowest of the base layers is decorated with painted tiles of floral designs with a pale blue background. The next level is a lotus design base in coloured glass. The next level above is decorated with the Garuda. One hundred and twelve Garudas, each grasping within its claws two Naga serpents, surround all four sides of the Ubosot. They are gilded in gold leaf and inlaid with glass mosaic. There are six doors, three on each end of the building, each door topped with crown-like, spire-shaped ornamentation and accessible only through a short staircase. The central door, slightly larger than the others, is used only by the king. The doors are decorated with mother-of-pearl inlay depicting mythical beasts and foliage designs. The walls of the Ubosot are extremely thick, and inside the inner door frame guardian deities are depicted in gold carrying either spears or swords.

On the outside, flanking the steps leading to the doors of the Ubosot, stand twelve bronze lions. Some of these are copies which were probably cast by Rama III. They were based on a pair of original lions taken from Cambodia by Rama I.

=== Interior ===
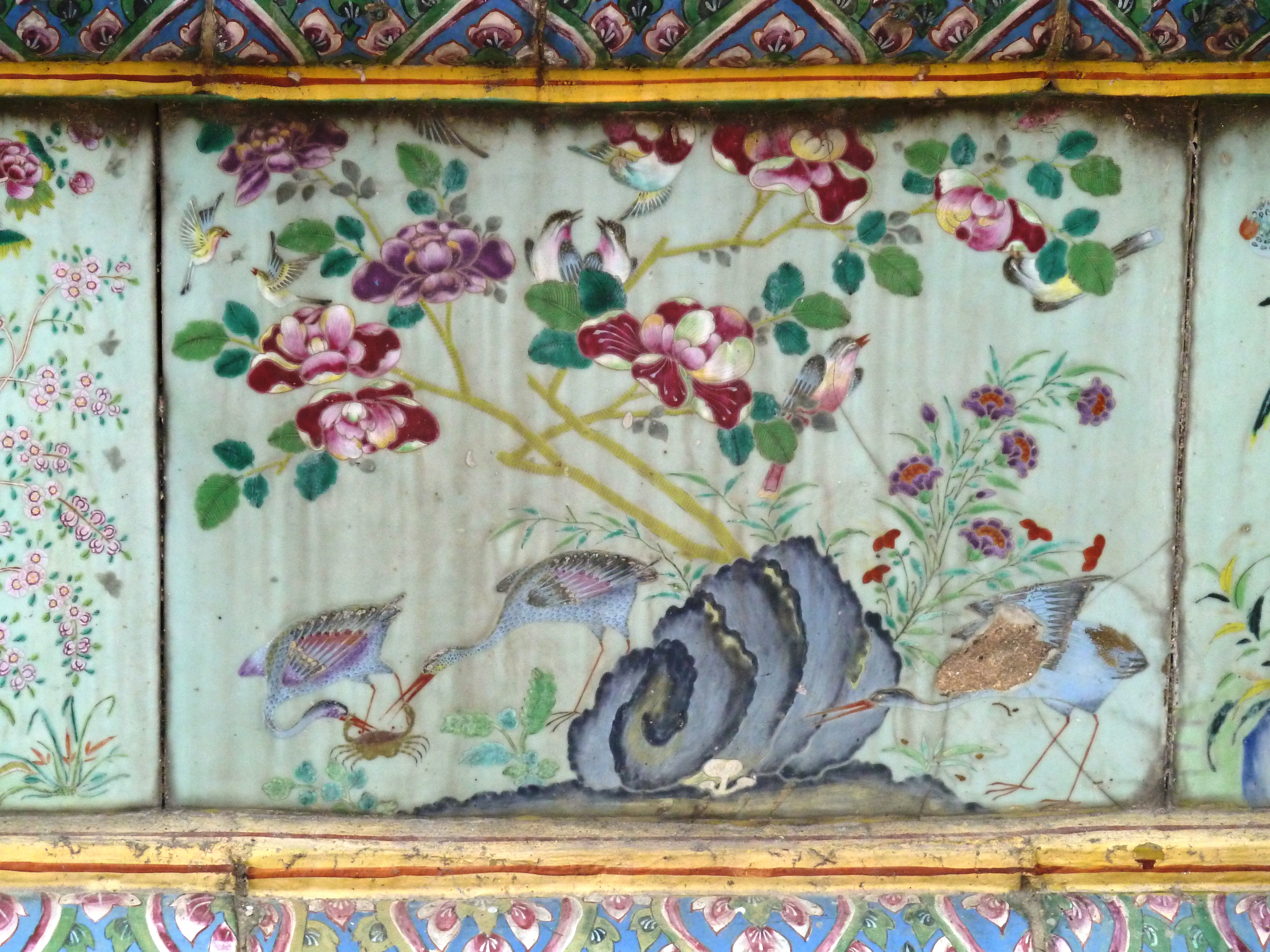
The lower base of the Ubosot is decorated with painted porcelain of flowers and birds on a light blue background.

The entire interior of the Ubosot is covered in painted murals depicting stories about the Buddha. The wooden ceiling is painted red with star designs made in glass mosaic. On the western end of the Ubosot is the multi-tiered pedestal on which the Emerald Buddha sits, and numerous other Buddha images surrounding it. On the eastern wall, the story of the Buddha and the demon Mara is depicted. This recounts the story of the Buddha when, prior to achieving enlightenment, Mara and his army tried to stop him. Instead, the Buddha, sitting in the Maravijaya attitude, asked the earth goddess Phra Mae Thorani to defend him. She is depicted right above the central door, wringing out water from her hair, creating a great flood that drowned Mara and his army. On the western wall behind the Emerald Buddha, the Traiphum or Buddhist cosmology is depicted. On the northern and southern walls the murals are divided into horizontal sections. Stories concerning the life of the Buddha are depicted on the top sections above the windows. Between each of the windows, the Jataka tales—tales of the previous lives of the Buddha—are depicted. Below the windows, the northern wall depicts a royal procession by land, with the king seated on a war elephant and marching troops on either side. The lower southern wall shows a royal procession by water, with royal barges and other war boats accompanying the king along a river.

=== The Emerald Buddha ===
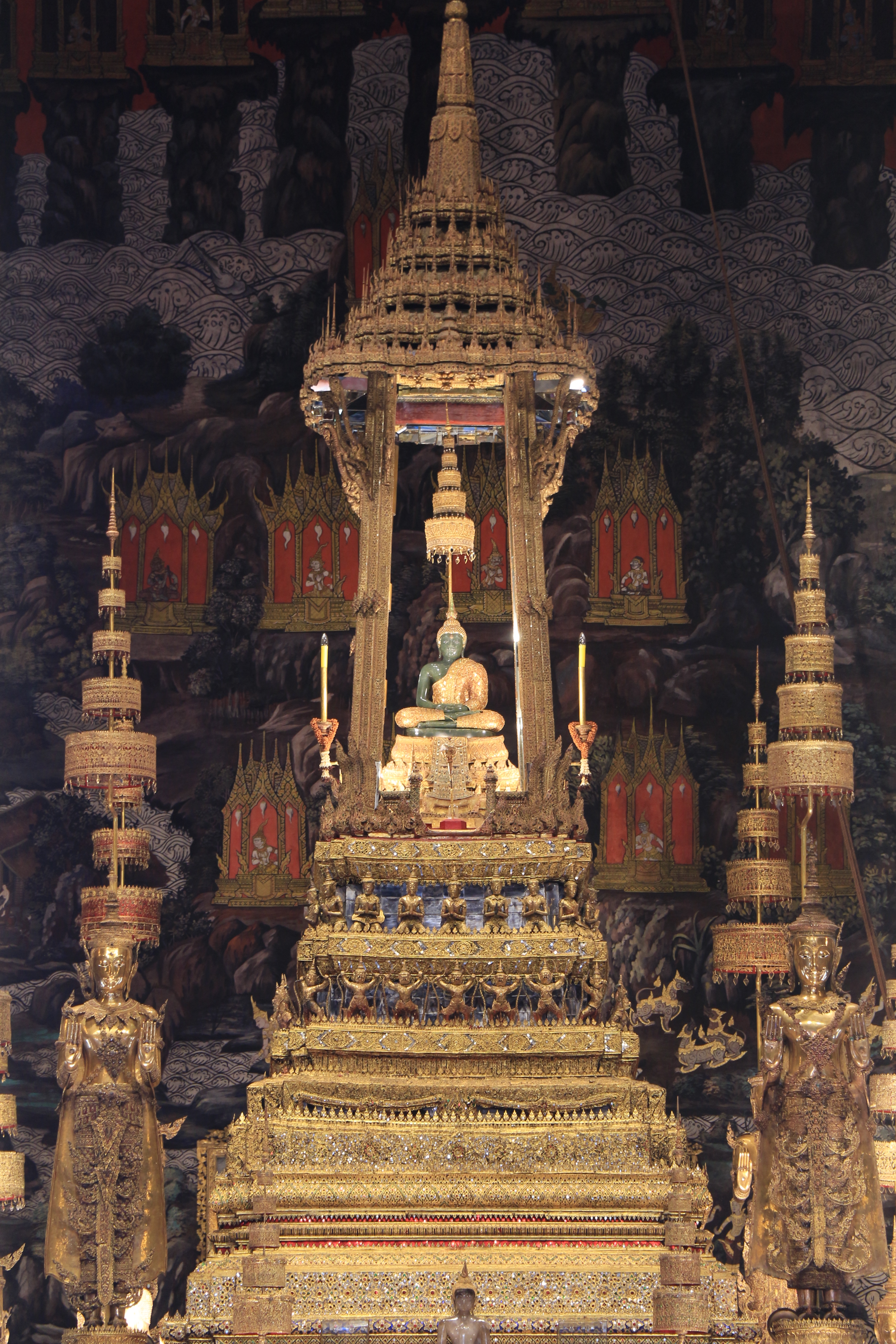
The Emerald Buddha enshrined in a busabok (canopied shrine)

The Emerald Buddha, or Phra Kaeo Morakot (พระแก้วมรกต), formally named Phra Phuttha Maha Mani Rattana Patimakon (พระพุทธมหามณีรัตนปฏิมากร), is the temple's main Buddha image as well as its namesake. The sacred image is of the meditating Gautama Buddha seated in the lotus position, made of a semi-precious green stone (usually described as jade), clothed in gold, and about 66 centimetres (26 in) tall.

The multi-tiered pedestal (ฐานชุกชี: than chukkachee) of the Emerald Buddha is in the shape of a butsabok throne, an open pavilion on a pyramidal base, topped with a tall spire. The highly ornamented pedestal was made in the reign of Rama I of carved wood and then gilded in gold leaf. Later, the pedestal was heightened by Rama III when he added the funeral bier of Rama II underneath the pedestal as a base. Numerous Buddha images are enshrined around the pedestal, as well as an accumulation of treasures donated by the various kings in the past 200 years. Examples include a pair of marble vases and a marble sermon throne from Europe, donated to the temple in 1908.

=== Other Buddha images ===
Surrounding the pedestal are other Buddha images made and donated to the temple by various kings. The most notable of these are:

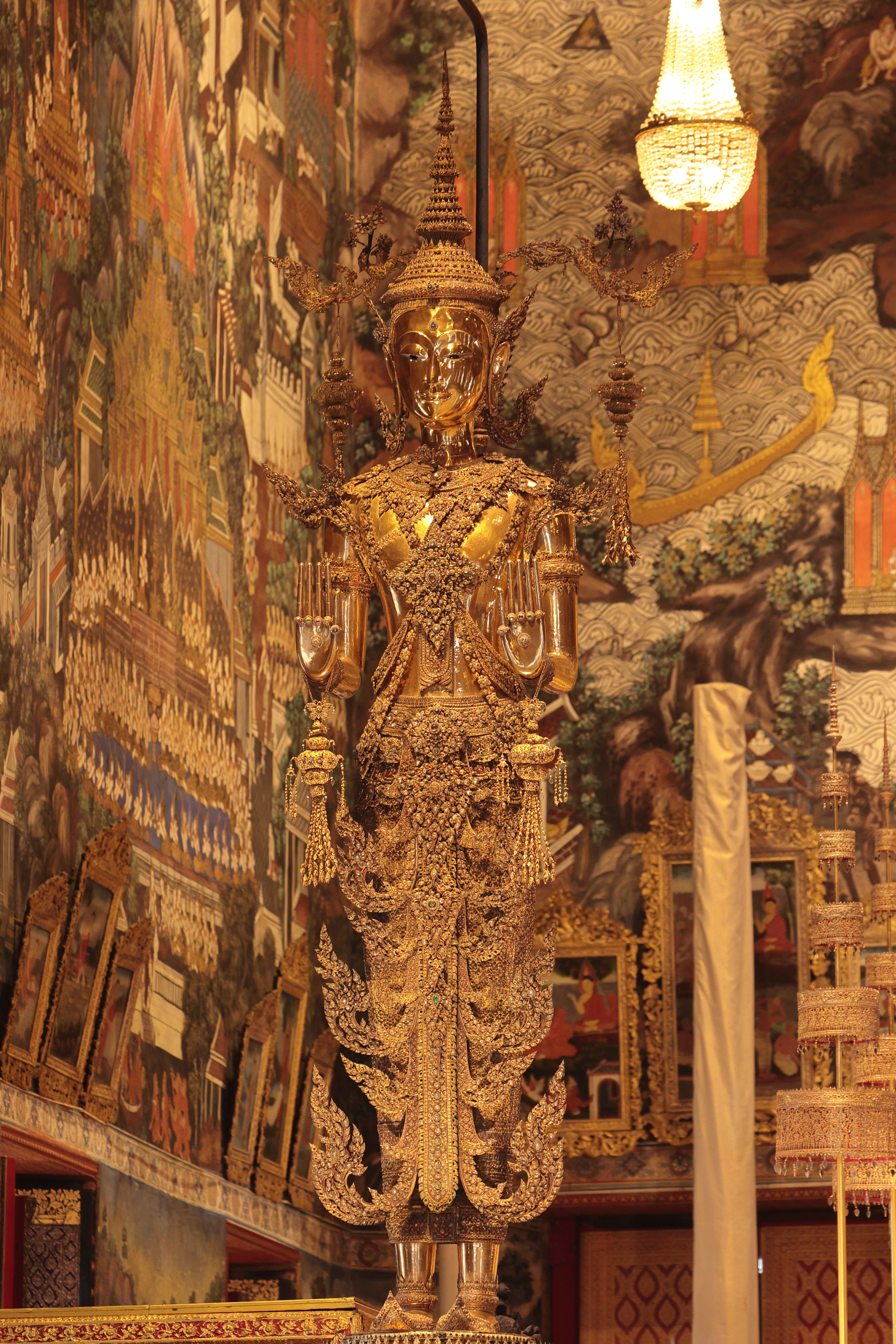
Phra Phuttha Loetla Naphalai

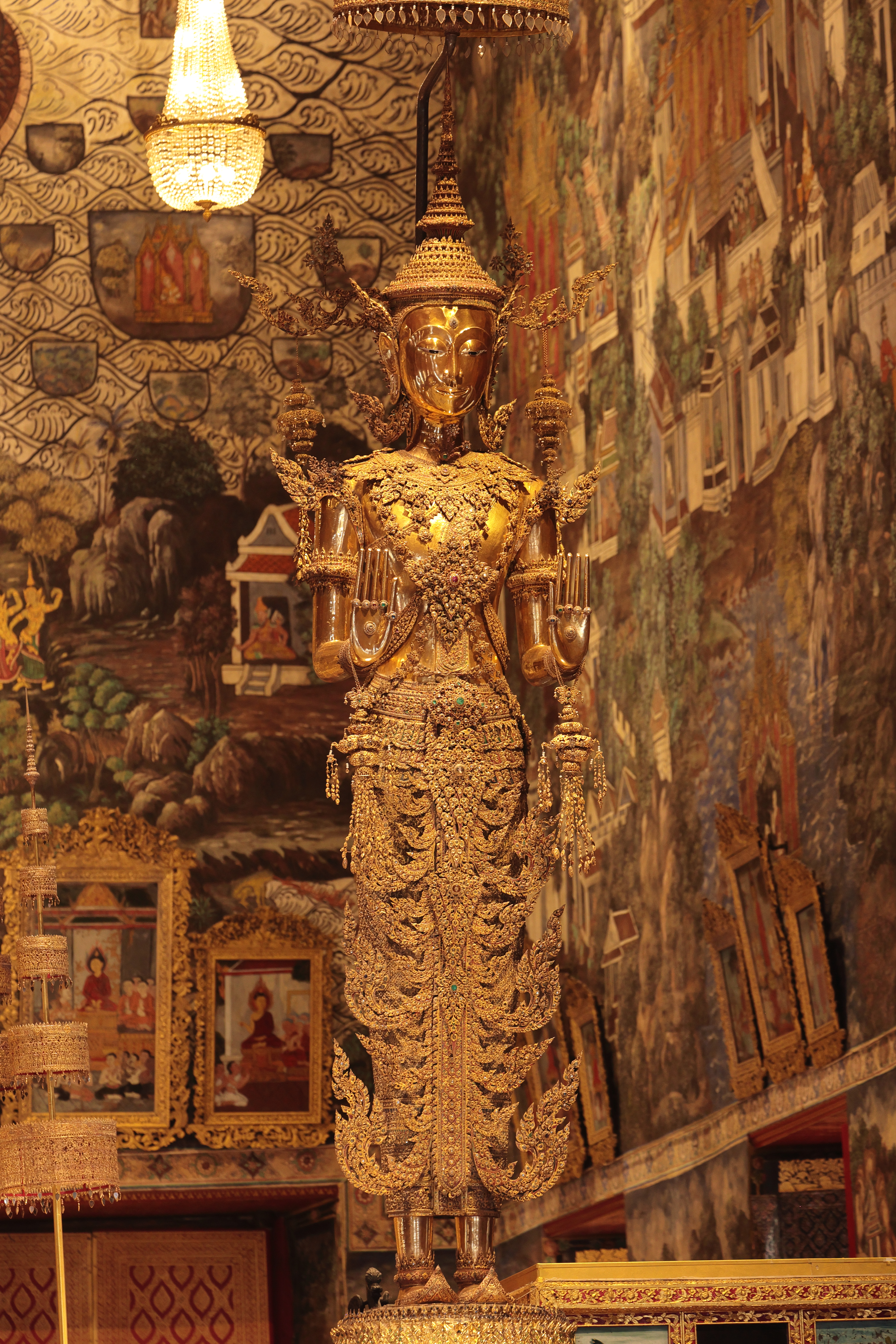
Phra Phuttha Yotfa Chulalok

==== Phra Phuttha Yotfa Chulalok ====
The image stands to the front and right side of the Emerald Buddha, looking from the entrance (to the pedestal's north). The standing Buddha has both of his palms turned outwards in the hand gesture called Abhayamudra, or the gesture of fearlessness. This iconographic attitude is called the "calming of the waters". This attitude commemorates one of the Buddha's miracles when he stopped a flood from reaching his dwelling. This attitude is symbolic of the Buddha's mastery over the passions. The image is richly attired, wearing a crown, necklace, rings, armlets and other regalia. This presentation of the Buddha is typical of the images cast by kings and royalty during the Ayutthaya and early Bangkok periods. The image is over 3 metres (9.8 ft) tall and was cast in bronze and gilded in gold on the orders of Rama III in 1841 to commemorate the reign of his grandfather Rama I.

==== Phra Phuttha Loetla Naphalai ====
The second image stands to the front and left of the Emerald Buddha (to the pedestal's south). It is identical to the other Buddha image. However, this Buddha image commemorates the reign of Rama II. The names of these two Buddha images; Phra Phuttha Yotfa Chulalok (พระพุทธยอดฟ้าจุฬาโลก) and Phra Phuttha Loetla Naphalai (พระพุทธเลิศหล้านภาลัย), officially given to them by royal proclamation issued by Rama III, are also the official reign names by which these two deceased kings would henceforth be known. Later, Rama IV would place relics of the Buddha within the crowns of each image.

==== Buddhas representing members of the Chakri dynasty ====
Surrounding the central pedestal of the Emerald Buddha are ten other Buddha images that commemorate the life of a member of the early Chakri dynasty. All of these were cast by successive kings for a deceased ancestor or relative. These images are also in the "calming of the waters" attitude. They are distinguished by the robes; those that have their robes splayed outwards represent male royalty, while those with robes that hug tightly around the body represent female royalty. The images are set on three levels, with one at each of the four corners of the pedestal on the top level, four similarly at the corners of the middle level, and only two towards the front of the pedestal on the bottom level.

==== Phra Samphuttha Phanni ====
Situated on the base in the front of the pedestal is the Phra Samphuttha Phanni (พระสัมพุทธพรรณี). This Buddha image was made by Rama IV in 1830 while he was still a monk. Once he became king in 1851, he swapped the image with the Phra Phuttha Sihing, which was moved to the Front Palace and given to his brother Pinklao. This golden Buddha image is depicted in the meditation attitude and is 67.5 centimetres (27 in) tall. The form and artistry of the image was a clear break from the previous traditional iconography of the Buddha. The naturalistic face and realistic robes was a style favoured by Rama IV.

Buddha images inside the Ubosot of Wat Phra Kaew

1. The Emerald Buddha
2. Phra Phuttha Yodfa Chulalok
3. Phra Phuttha Loetla Naphalai
4. King Rama I
5. Maha Sura Singhanat, the viceroy of Rama I
6. King Rama II
7. Maha Senanurak, the viceroy of Rama II
8. Princess consort Sri Sulalai, mother of Rama III
9. Princess Apsorn Sudathep, daughter of Rama III
10. Princess Thepsudawadi, sister of Rama I (not visible)
11. Princess Srisudarat, sister of Rama I (not visible)
12. Anurak Devesh, deputy viceroy of Rama I (not visible)
13. Princess Srisunthornthep, daughter of Rama I (not visible)
14. Phra Kaew Wang Na
15. Phra Samphuttha Phanni
16. Marble sermon throne

=== Buddha image halls ===
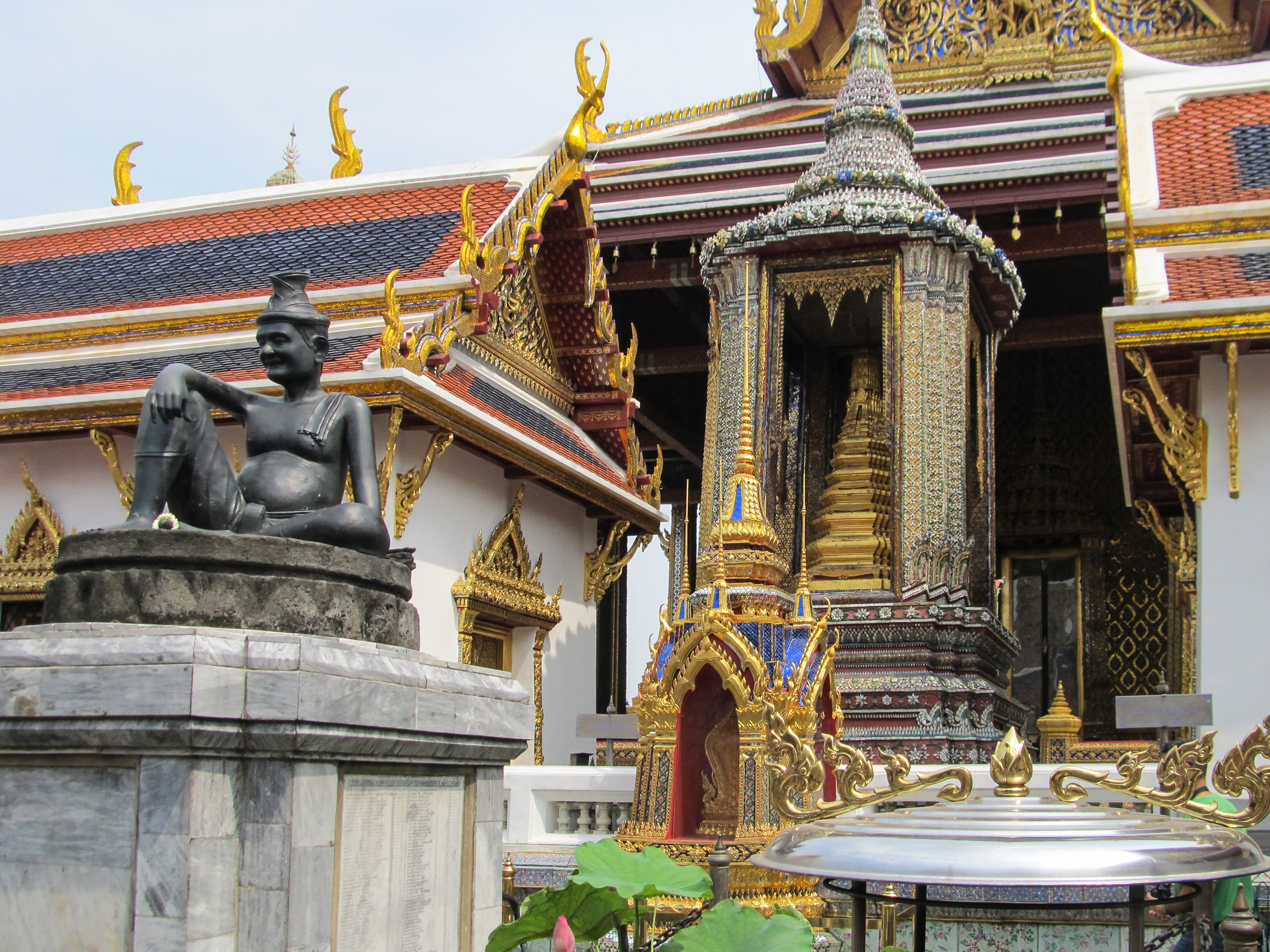
Ho Ratchakoramanuson, Phra Photithat Phiman and Ho Ratchaphongsanuson stand at the back of the Ubosot, with the hermit in front.

Three structures sit along the west walls of the Ubosot, all commissioned by Rama IV. Ratchakoramanuson Buddha image hall (หอพระราชกรมานุสรณ์) is the northernmost, followed by Phra Photithat Phiman (พระโพธิธาตุพิมาน) and Ratchaphongsanuson Buddha image hall (หอพระราชพงศานุสร). The Ratchakoramanuson and Ratchaphongsanuson are identical. They hold a total of forty-two Buddha images. The Ratchaphongsanuson hall holds thirty-four Buddha images representing the former kings of the Ayutthaya and Thonburi kingdoms—the murals inside accordingly depict the history of the foundation of Ayutthaya—while the Ratchakoramanuson hall holds eight Buddha images of the Rattanakosin Kingdom, with murals depicting the foundation of Bangkok. All of the Buddha images were cast in copper for Rama III. His successor Rama IV had them gilded in gold. In between these halls is the Phra Photithat Phiman, a butsabok throne with a crown-shaped spire. Inside is a smaller stupa of gold containing a relic of the Buddha obtained by Rama IV from the north of Thailand.

=== Sala ===
Surrounding the Ubosot, all along its four sides are twelve open sala rai (ศาลาราย), or pavilions, with grey marble bases. These sala were built during the reign of Rama I for the faithful to listen to chants or sermons emanating from within the Ubosot. All twelve pavilions are of the same design and size, with six square columns supporting a roof of blue and orange glazed tiles. The pavilions have been reconstructed and restored several times by different kings throughout the years.

=== Chao Mae Kuan Im ===
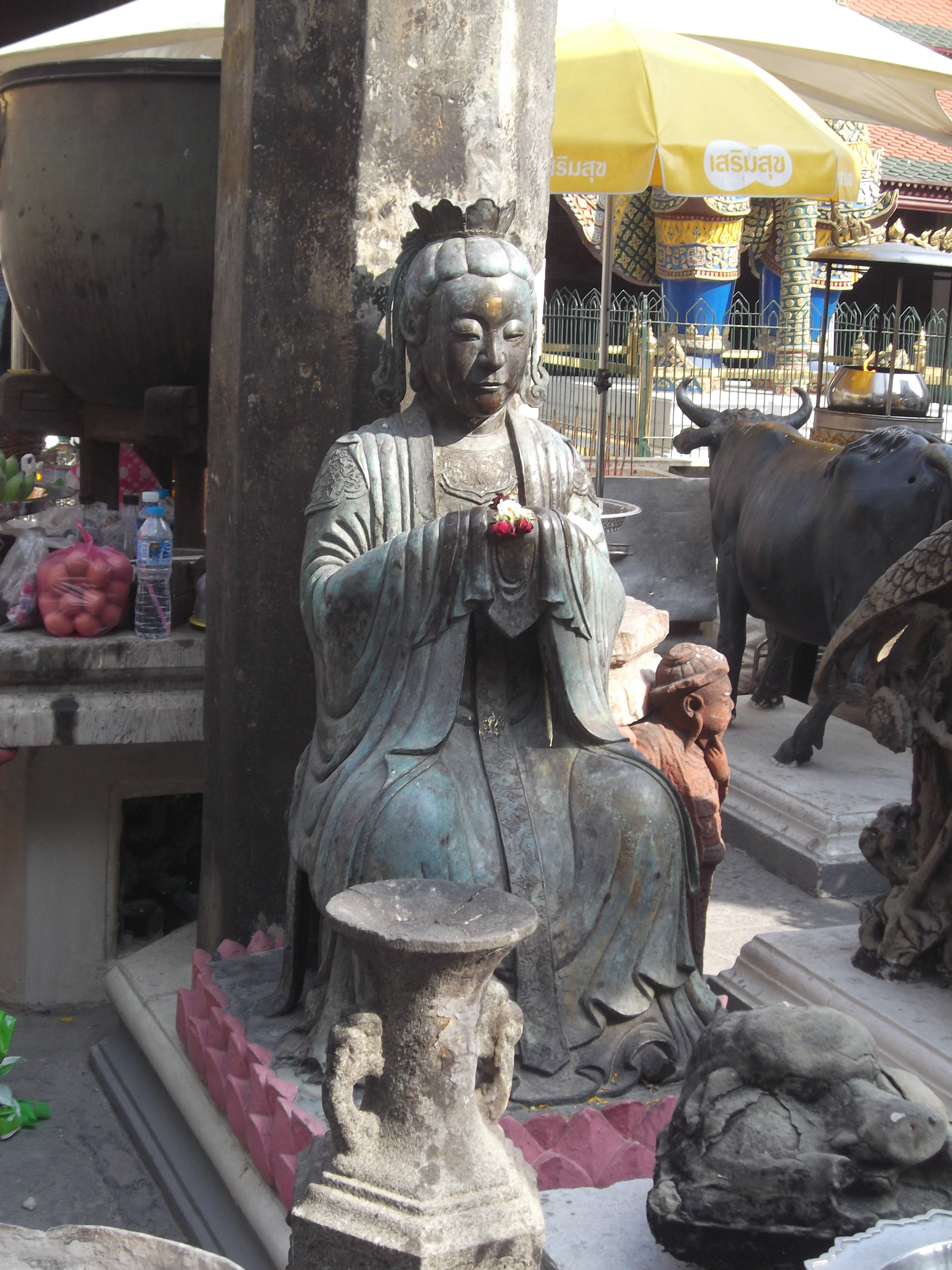
The stone statue of a seated Guanyin, called Chao Mae Kuan Im in Thai

Opposite the front of the Ubosot is a stone image of Chao Mae Kuan Im (or Guanyin), a Bodhisattva known as Avalokiteśvara in the Mahayana branch of Buddhism. She sits in front of a sandstone column topped by a bronze lotus flower, and is flanked by two stone mythical birds called Nok Wayupak. Around this group there are two lead oxen facing the gate. These were formerly part of the king's pavilion where he would watch the Royal Ploughing Ceremony, an important agricultural rite performed annually in front of the reigning king. The ox statues were moved into the temple by Rama V. Around this area, incense sticks can be lit and flower offerings made by the public, as these activities are prohibited within the Ubosot itself.

=== The Hermit ===
Behind the Ubosot sits the image of the hermit (or rishi) Jivaka Komarabhacca (ชีวกโกมารภัจจ์). The image was cast in bronze during the reign of Rama III for the temple. In front of the hermit is a large grinding stone. In the past, traditional medical practitioners would make their potions on this stone, imbuing it with the sanctity of the hermit image.

== Phaithi terrace ==
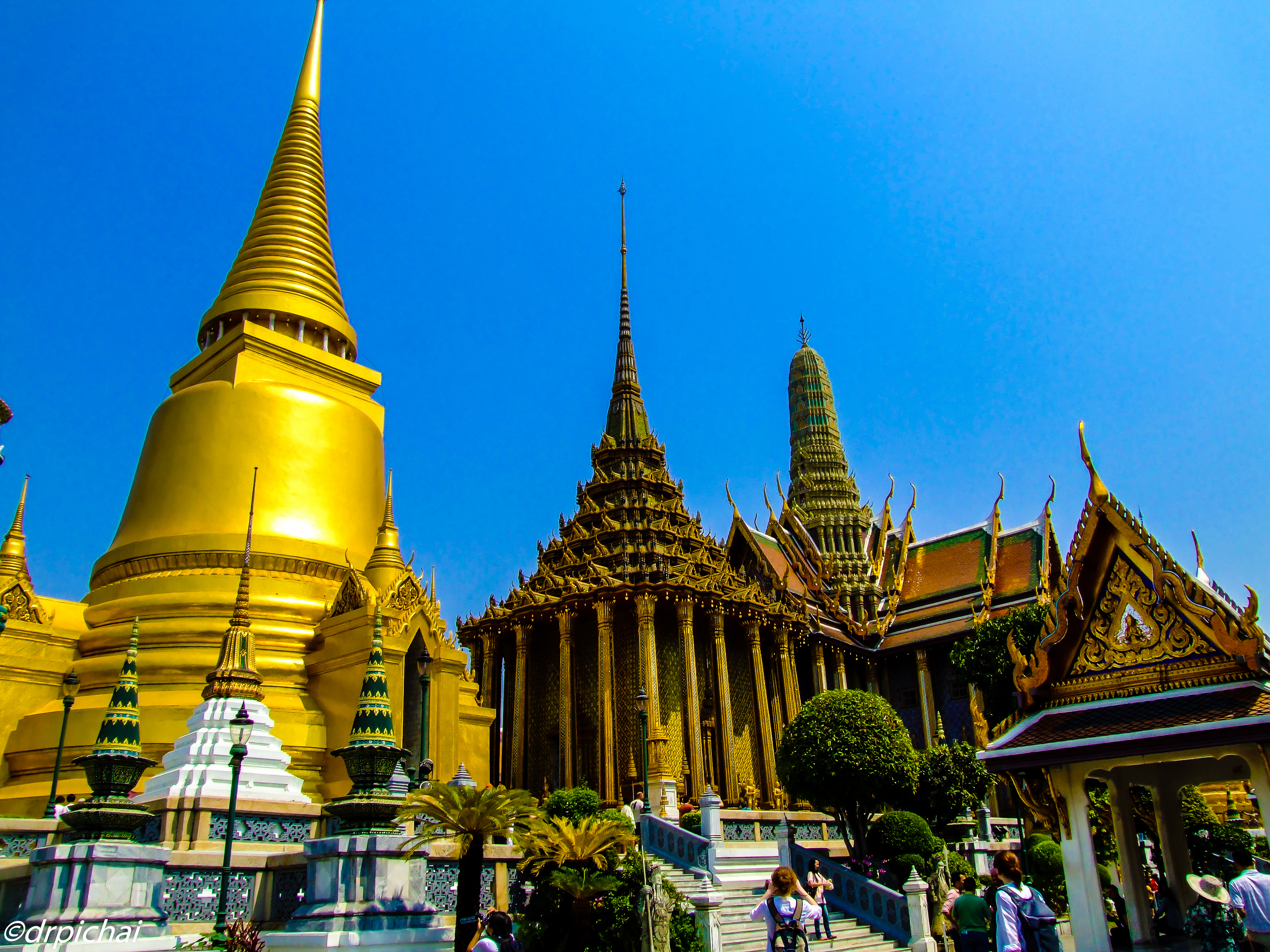
The Phaithi terrace with principal buildings from right to left; Prasat Phra Thep Bidon, Phra Mondop and the Phra Si Rattana Chedi.

The Than Phaithi (ฐานไพที) is a raised terrace or base that elevates several important structures inside the temple, the three principal ones being Prasat Phra Thep Bidon, the Phra Mondop and the Phra Si Rattana Chedi. The terrace has six sets of steps leading up to it: two on the north, one on the east, two on the south and one on the west. Originally, the terrace contained only the Phra Mondop; in 1855, Rama IV ordered the expansion of the base, upon which the two other structures were later built. The arrangement of these structures in a straight line echoes the classical arrangement of temples in both Sukhothai and Ayutthaya.

=== Prasat Phra Thep Bidon ===
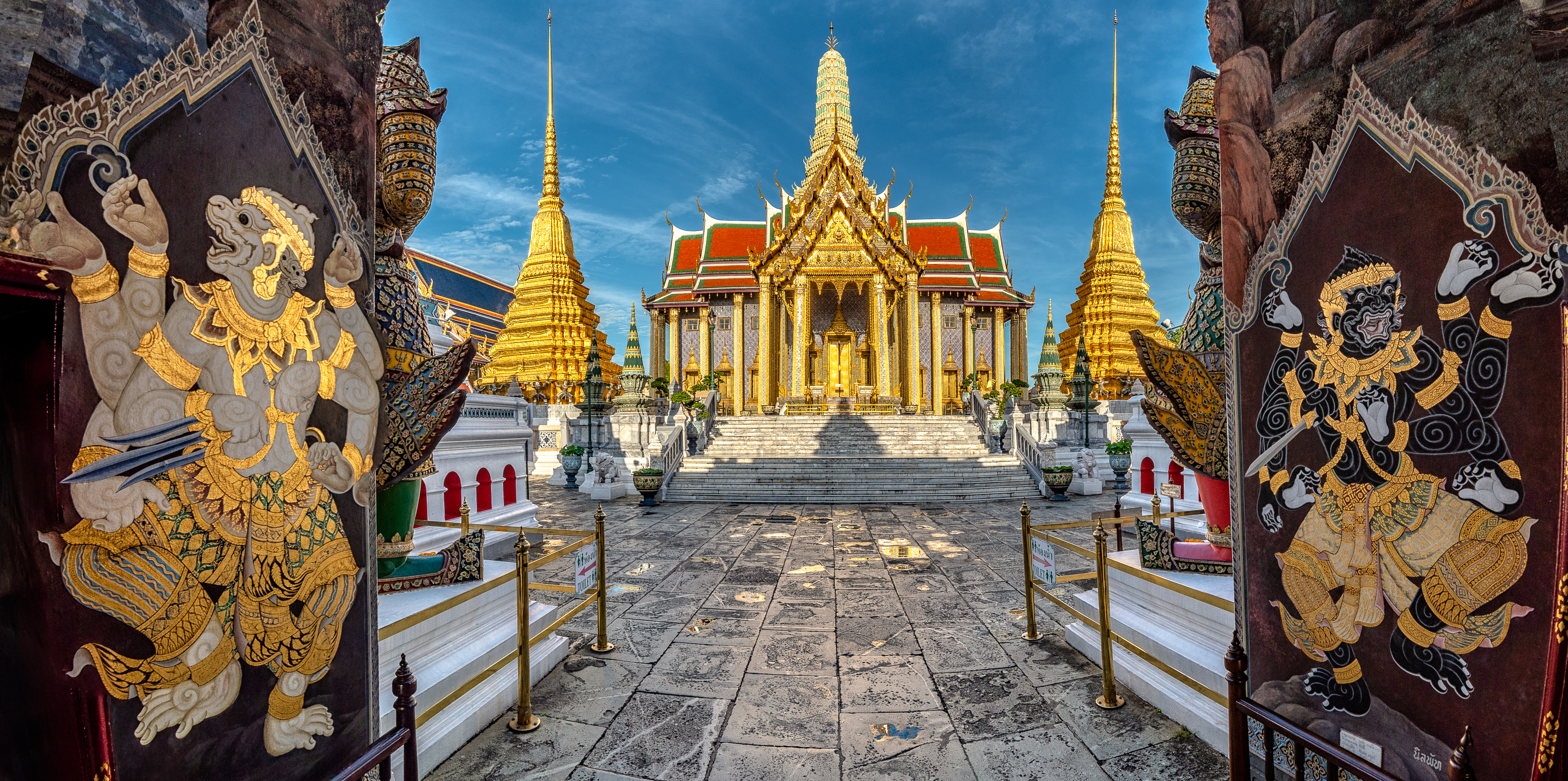
East entrance to Prasat Phra Thep Bidon or the Royal Pantheon, constructed by Rama IV in 1855.

The Prasat Phra Thep Bidon (ปราสาทพระเทพบิดร) is on the eastern end of the Than Phaithi. Originally built to house the Emerald Buddha by Rama IV, construction on the first structure—then called the Phutthaprang Prasat (พุทธปรางค์ปราสาท)—began in 1855, based on the Prasat Thong in the royal palace of Ayutthaya. The King died before its completion in 1882, and his plans to move the Emerald Buddha into it never materialised. In 1903, a fire ravaged the building, necessitating a complete rebuild. The present structure was completed during the reign of Rama VI in the early 20th century. The King decided to change the purpose of the building, and turned it into a memorial to his predecessors. The name was changed to Prasat Phra Thep Bidon, known in English as the Royal Pantheon. Rama VI had full-size, lifelike statues of the first five Chakri kings made and installed in the pantheon. Further statues were added in 1927, 1959 and 2020. Currently, the pantheon contains nine statues. Normally closed to the public, the pantheon is opened annually on 6 April for Chakri Memorial Day, a national holiday in Thailand. The pantheon is laid out in a cruciform plan. It has four entrances, one at the end of each arm, the main entrance being on the east side. The building is in the form known as prasat, with a tall spire in the middle of the roof, a feature usually reserved for royal residences. The roof is covered in green and orange tiles. The four pediments of the pantheon depict the personal insignia of the first four Chakri kings. This is a break with the traditional depiction of Narayana, which was previously seen on royal temples. The north pediment depicts the personal insignia of Rama I (a Thai numeral one), the southern of Rama II (a Garuda), the west of Rama III (a triple-doored vimana) and the east of Rama IV (a royal crown). The exterior walls of the pantheon are decorated with blue tiles with floral motifs. A royal crown tops each of the doors and windows of the pantheon. The east steps of the Than Phaithi leading up towards the pantheon were redesigned with marble steps; on either side the railings are in the form of two five-headed crowned Phaya Nagas.

=== Phra Mondop ===
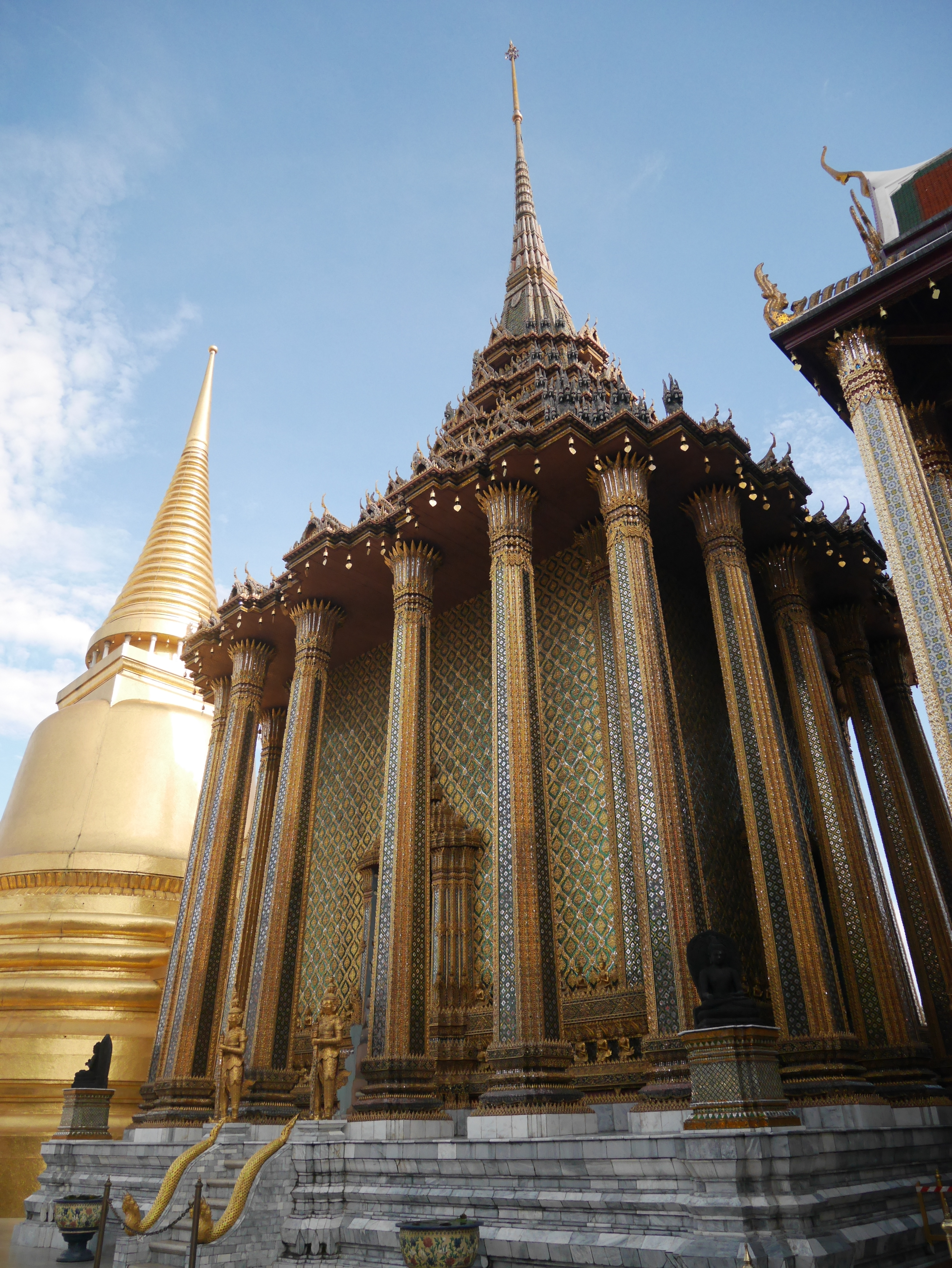
The Phra Mondop or the library contains several ornamented bookcases filled with sacred texts.

The Phra Mondop (พระมณฑป) is situated in the middle of the Than Phaithi. The Phra Mondop is a repository of sacred texts, sometimes referred to as a library (ho trai). The present structure was built by Rama I to replace an earlier structure that burnt down. This previous structure was built in the middle of a pool on raised columns to protect the texts from termites; such buildings were a common feature in Thai temples. The new Phra Mondop discarded this feature, instead putting the library on top of a raised base. In 1788 Rama I ordered a complete revision and compilation of the Tripitaka, as the previous royal copies were destroyed in the sack of Ayutthaya in 1767. This revision was made by the monks of Wat Mahathat Yuwaratrangsarit. Once the revision was complete, a set of the texts was deposited inside the Phra Mondop. During the reign of Rama III, the exterior of the Phra Mondop was restored in time for the fiftieth anniversary of the founding of Bangkok in 1832. The Phra Mondop is roughly square in outline and has a mondop style roof: a square-based tapering spire. When Rama IV decided to build the two structures on either side of the Phra Mondop, he decided to lower the height of the spire significantly. The Phra Mondop is richly decorated on the exterior walls—twenty square columns with indented corners surround the central hall. The columns are decorated with white, green and red glass. The exterior walls are adorned with the thepphanom motif, or devas in prayer, covered with gold leaf and surrounded with green glass. Numerous small, gilded wind-bells with Bodhi leaf sails are hung from the eaves on all sides. Crowns adorn the top of the four doors on the sides of the Phra Mondop. On the four corners of the library are four stone Buddhas. The original statues were presented by the Governor-General of the Dutch East Indies to Rama V during his 1896 royal visit to the Borobodur Temple in Java, Indonesia. These Borobudur-style Buddhas are replicas, with the originals now in the Museum of the Emerald Buddha Temple. The Phra Mondop only has one room; the floor is covered in a mat made of woven silver. In the middle of the room is a highly intricate mother-of-pearl inlay manuscript cabinet containing all 84,000 chapters of the Tripitaka. Four smaller cabinets are placed at the four corners of the room.

=== Phra Si Rattana Chedi ===
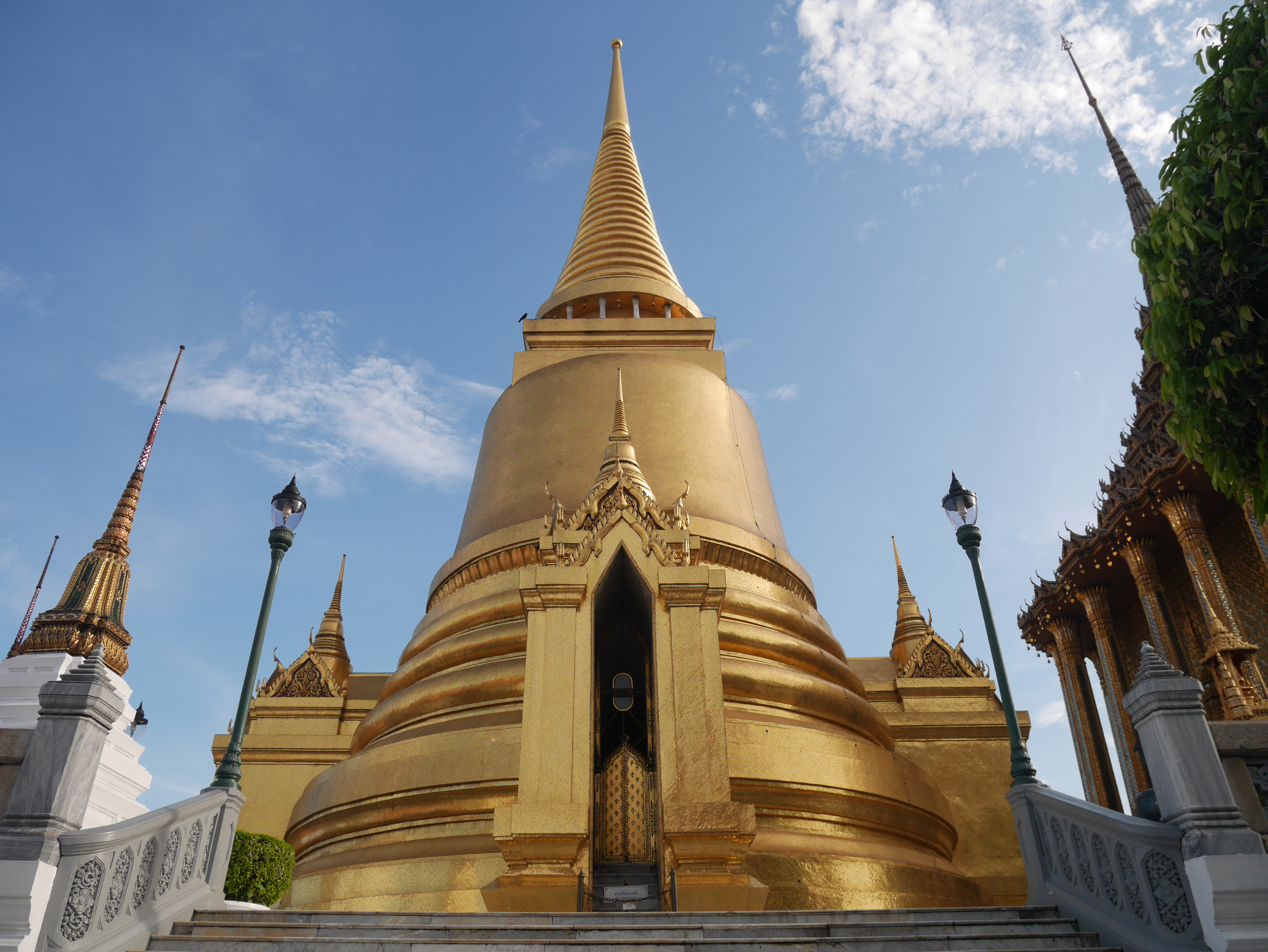
The Phra Si Rattana Chedi, a traditional stupa covered with gold mosaic tiles imported from Italy

The Phra Si Rattana Chedi (พระศรีรัตนเจดีย์) is on the western end of the Than Phaithi and houses relics of the Buddha from Sri Lanka, which were given to Rama IV. Constructed in 1855, the circular bell-shaped stupa (or chedi) is built of brick masonry. The stupa was later entirely covered in gold-coloured tiles specially imported from Italy by Rama V. The bell-shaped stupa is made up of several tiers, with large round bases leading up to a bell-shaped middle, interrupted by a square section that is then topped with twenty concentric circular discs of decreasing size topped by a tall spire. The design was based on the stupas of Wat Phra Si Sanphet in Ayutthaya, which in turn took inspiration from the stupas of Sri Lanka. The stupa has four entrances with protruding porticoes. Each portico is crowned with an exact miniature of the stupa and is decorated on three sides with a pediment. The interior of the stupa is a round hall, from the ceiling of which a chatra (multi-tiered royal umbrella) is suspended. In the middle of the hall is a smaller stupa of black lacquer; this is the reliquary in which the relics of the Buddha are kept.

=== Phra Suwannachedi ===
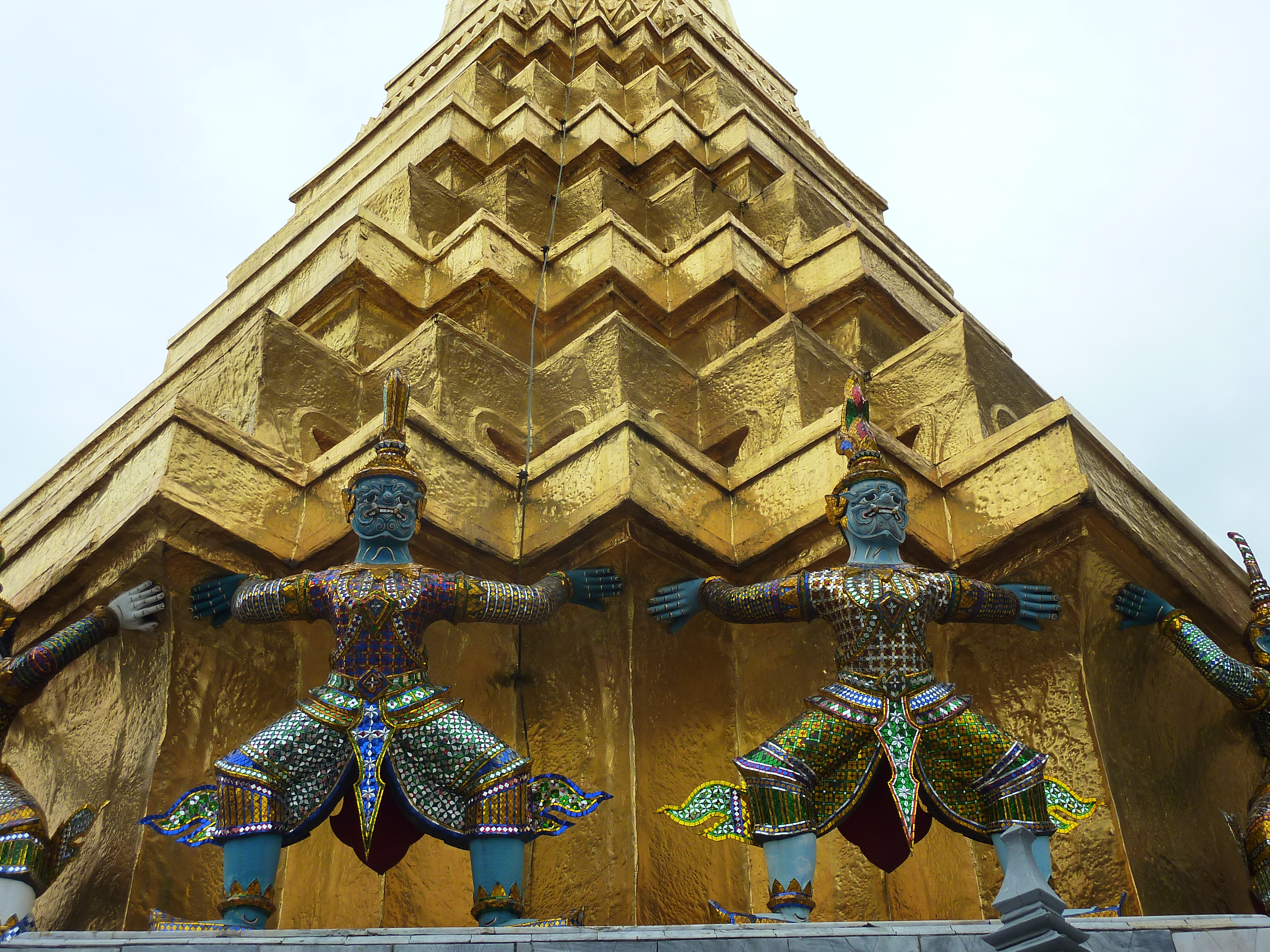
Detail of one of the golden chedi, showing the supporting giants around the base

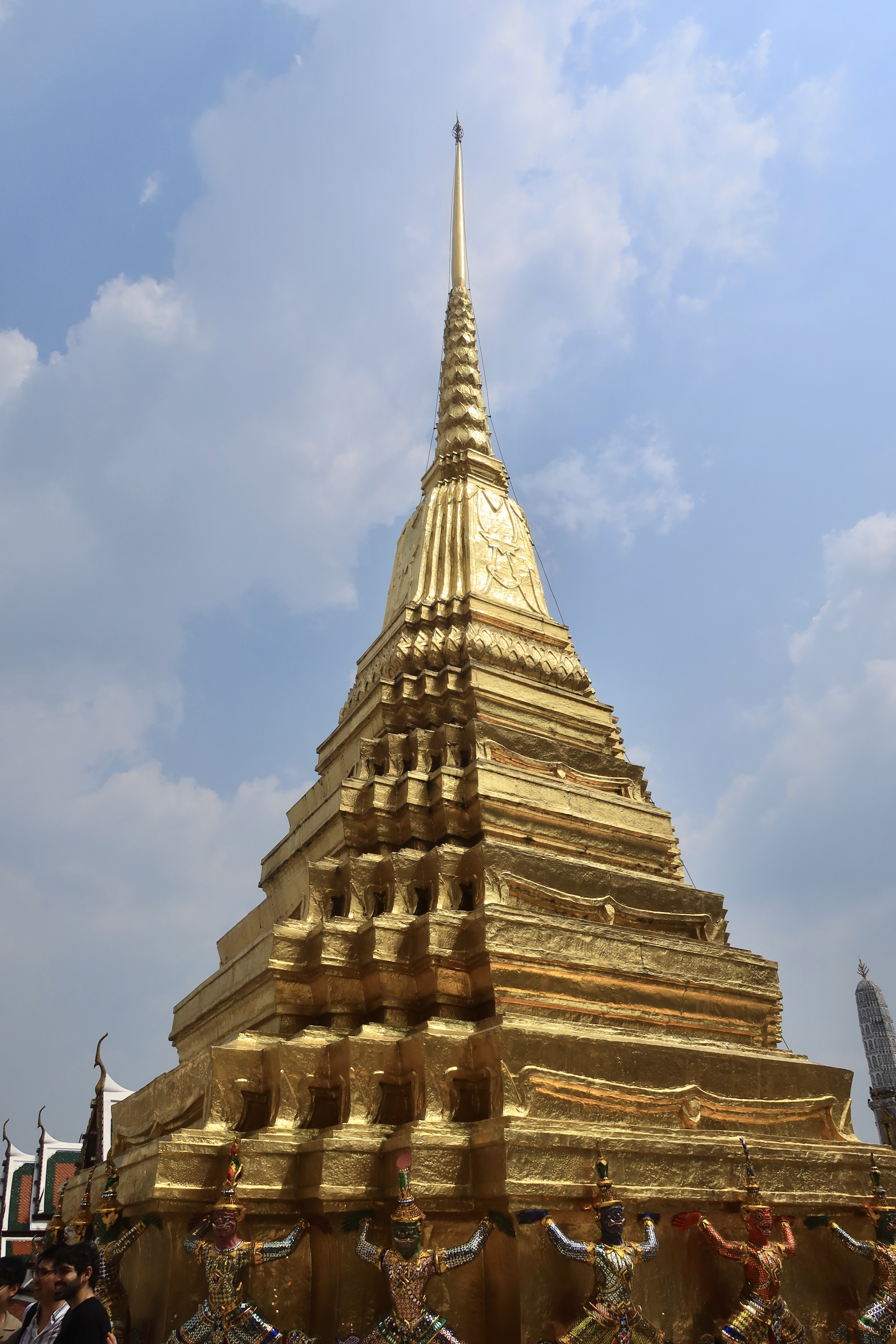
A golden chedi rising in tiered terraces to a spire

Two golden stupas, titled Phra Suwannachedi (พระสุวรรณเจดีย์), are situated to the east of the terrace, flanking the steps leading up to the Prasat Phra Thep Bidon. The two chedi were built by Rama I to commemorate his parents, the southern chedi for his father Thongdi and the northern for this mother Daoreung. The two chedi are almost identical. They each have a marble octagonal base 8.5 metres (28 ft) wide and topped with a golden, square-based stupa with triple indented corners 16 metres (52 ft) in height. The top spire is decorated in nine levels of layered lotus bud motifs. The structures are covered in copper sheets painted over with lacquer and gilded in gold leaf. The two chedi were moved when the terrace was expanded to accommodate the royal pantheon. Around the base of the chedi, Rama V had figures of monkeys and yaksha ("giants") supporting the chedi. Each has four monkeys and sixteen giants around the sides. The colour and clothing of these figures identify them with a particular character in the Ramakien epic.

=== Monuments of the royal insignia ===
The Monuments of the royal insignia or Phra Borom Ratcha Sanyalak (พระบรมราชสัญลักษณ์) are four monuments depicting the nine insignia of the kings of the Chakri dynasty. In 1882, on the centenary of the founding of Bangkok, Rama V ordered the construction of three monuments in the form of a butsabok throne to house depictions of the insignia of previous kings. These insignia were based on the kings' personal seals. Later, a fourth was added to accommodate later kings. They surround the Phra Mondop at each corner. Each of the golden butsabok thrones are built on raised marble bases, each side with inscriptions describing each king's contribution to the building or repair of the temple itself. On each of the corners are two miniature golden multi-tiered umbrellas: the four on the upper level have seven tiers and those on the bottom level have five tiers. Surrounding the monuments are miniature bronze elephants; these represent the white elephants important in each king's reign. The first monument on the northwest corner depicts the insignia of the first three kings; Rama I (the crown without ear ornaments), Rama II (the Garuda) and Rama III (a triple-doored vimana). The southeast monument houses the insignia of Rama IV (a royal crown), and the southwest monument is the insignia of Rama V (the Phra Kiao or coronet). The fourth monument on the northeast corner depicts the insignia of four kings: Rama VI (a thunderbolt or vajra), Rama VII (three arrows), Rama VIII (a Bodhisattva) and Rama IX (the Octagonal Throne and chakra).

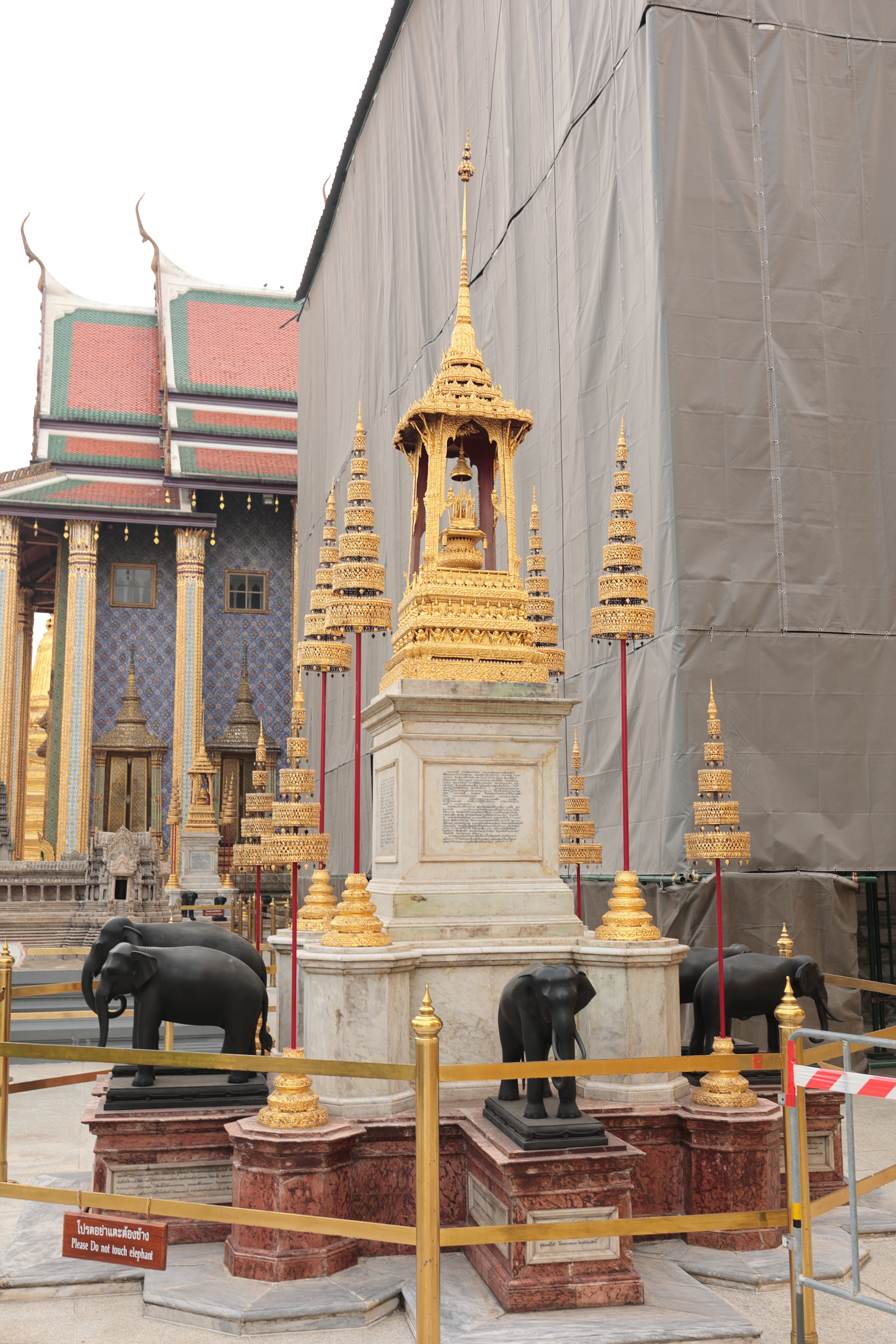
Monuments of the royal insignia

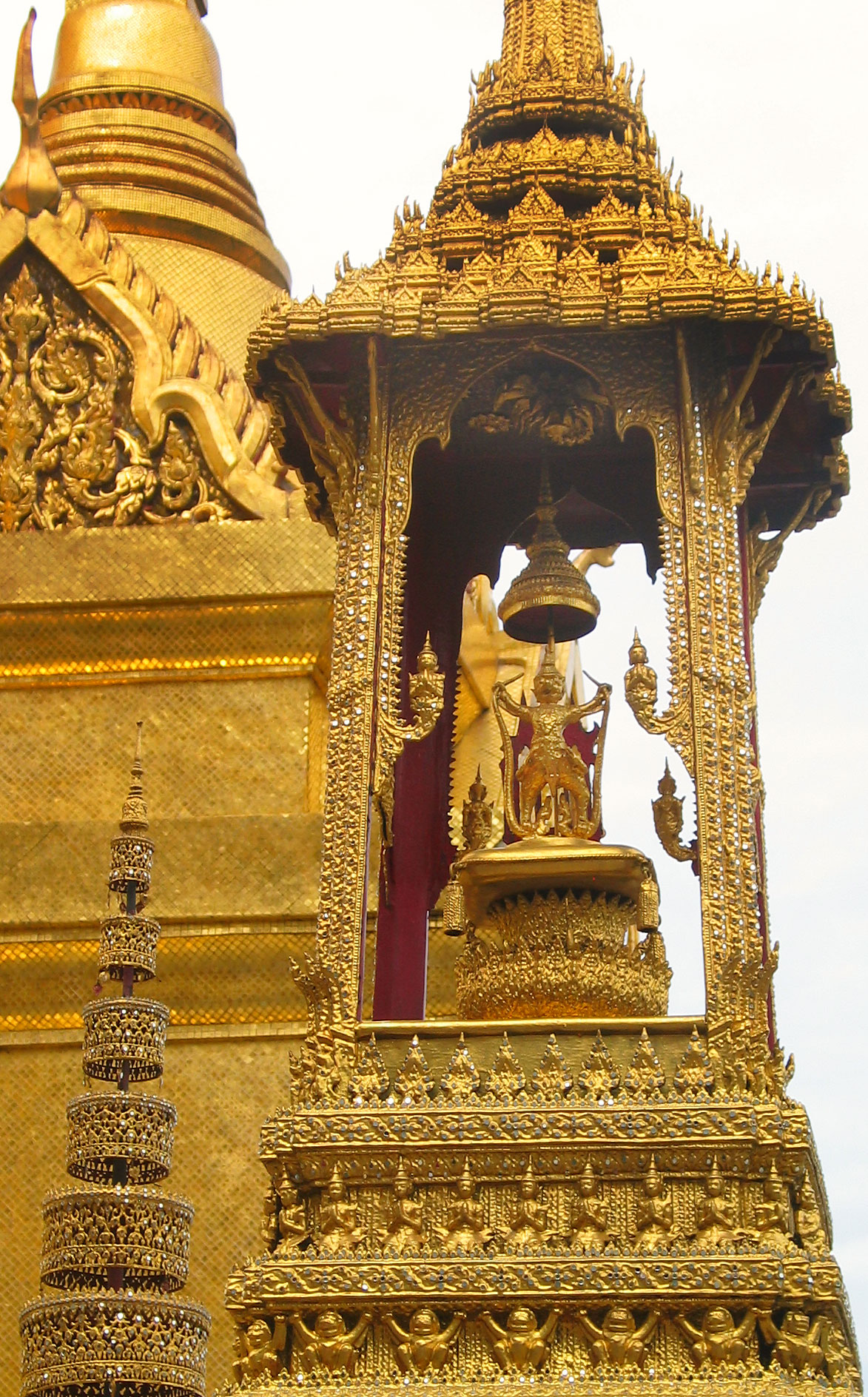
Insignia of Rama I, Rama II and Rama III (not shown)

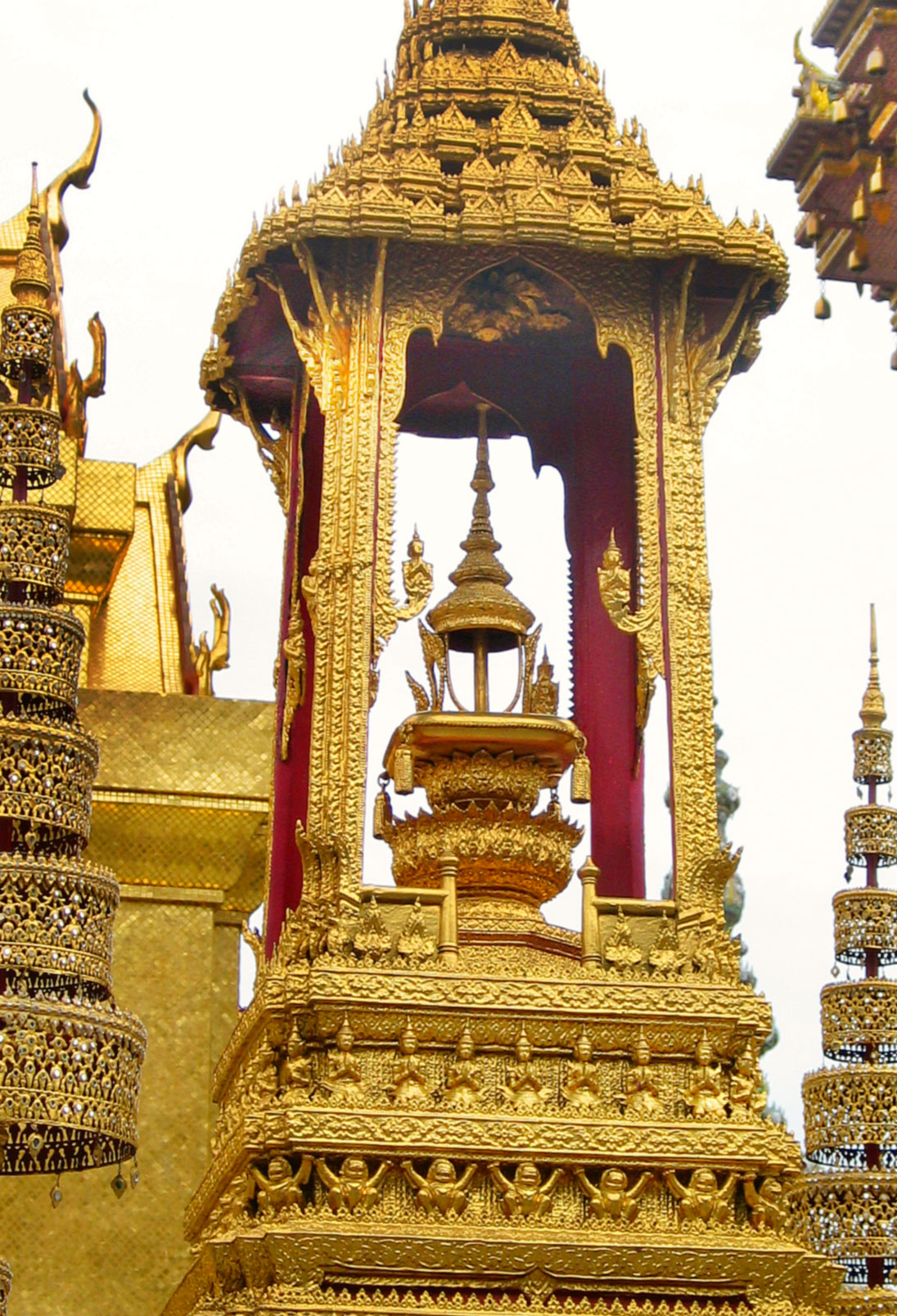
Insignia of Rama IV

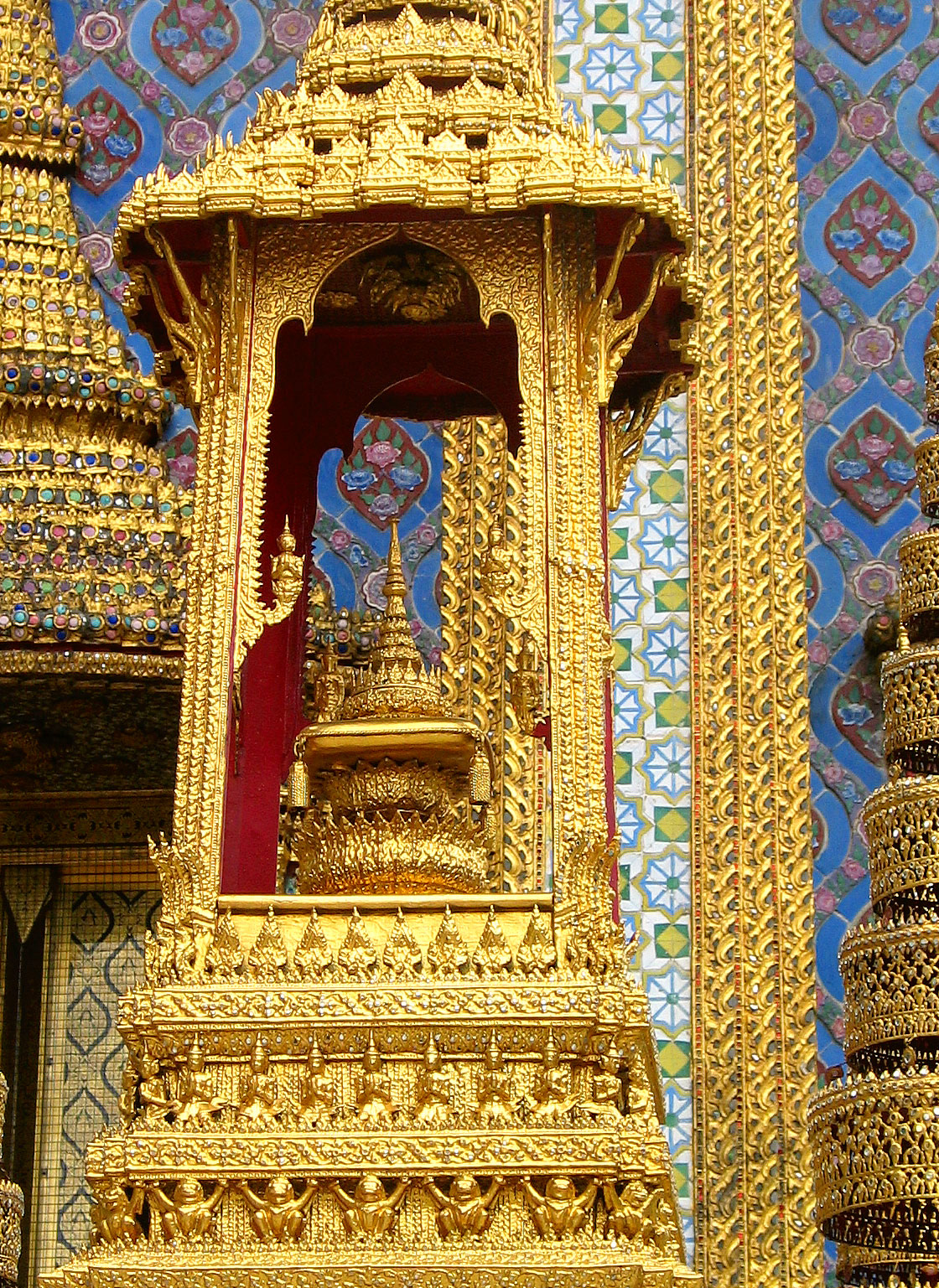
Insignia of Rama V

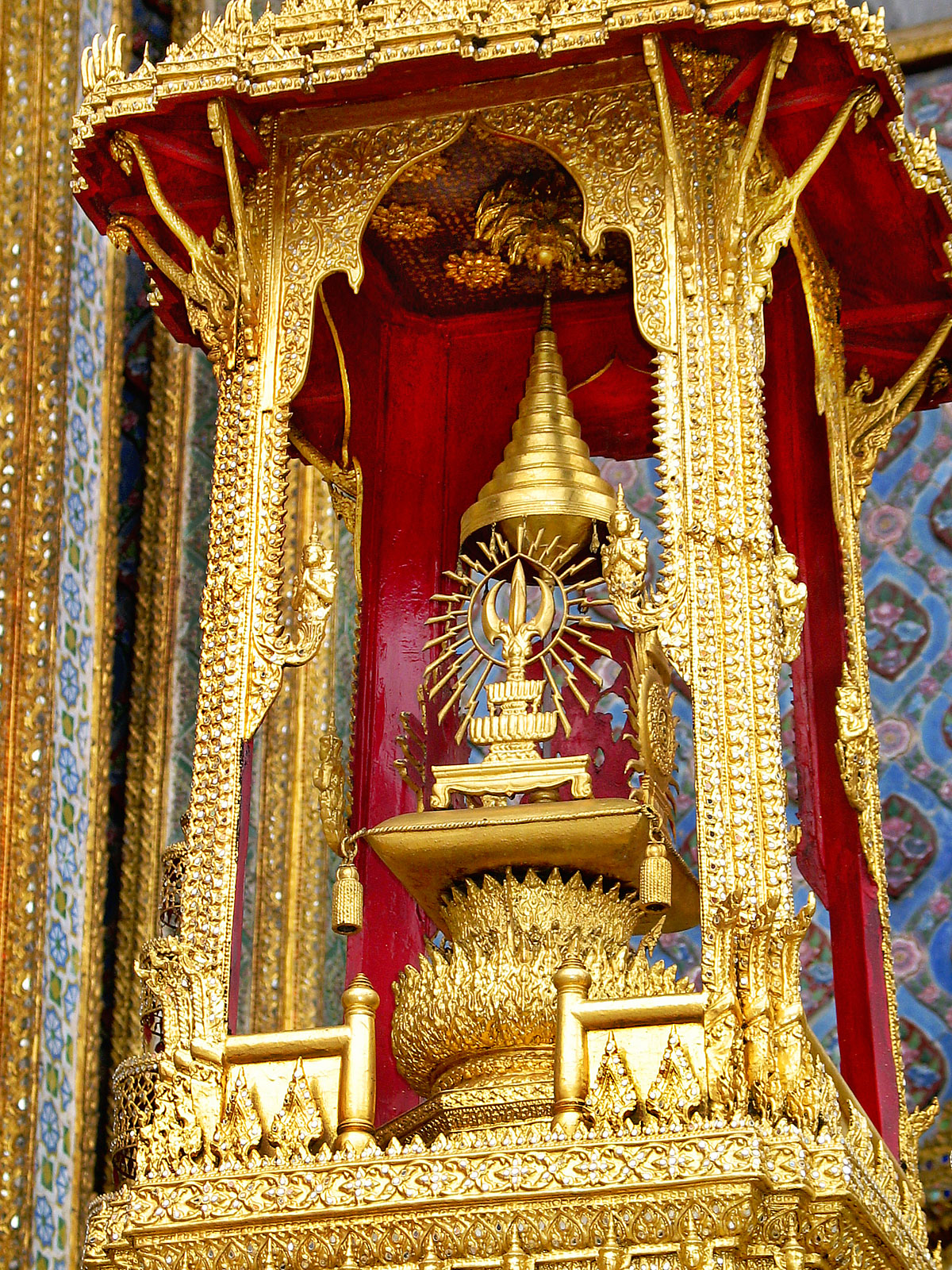
Insignia of Rama VI

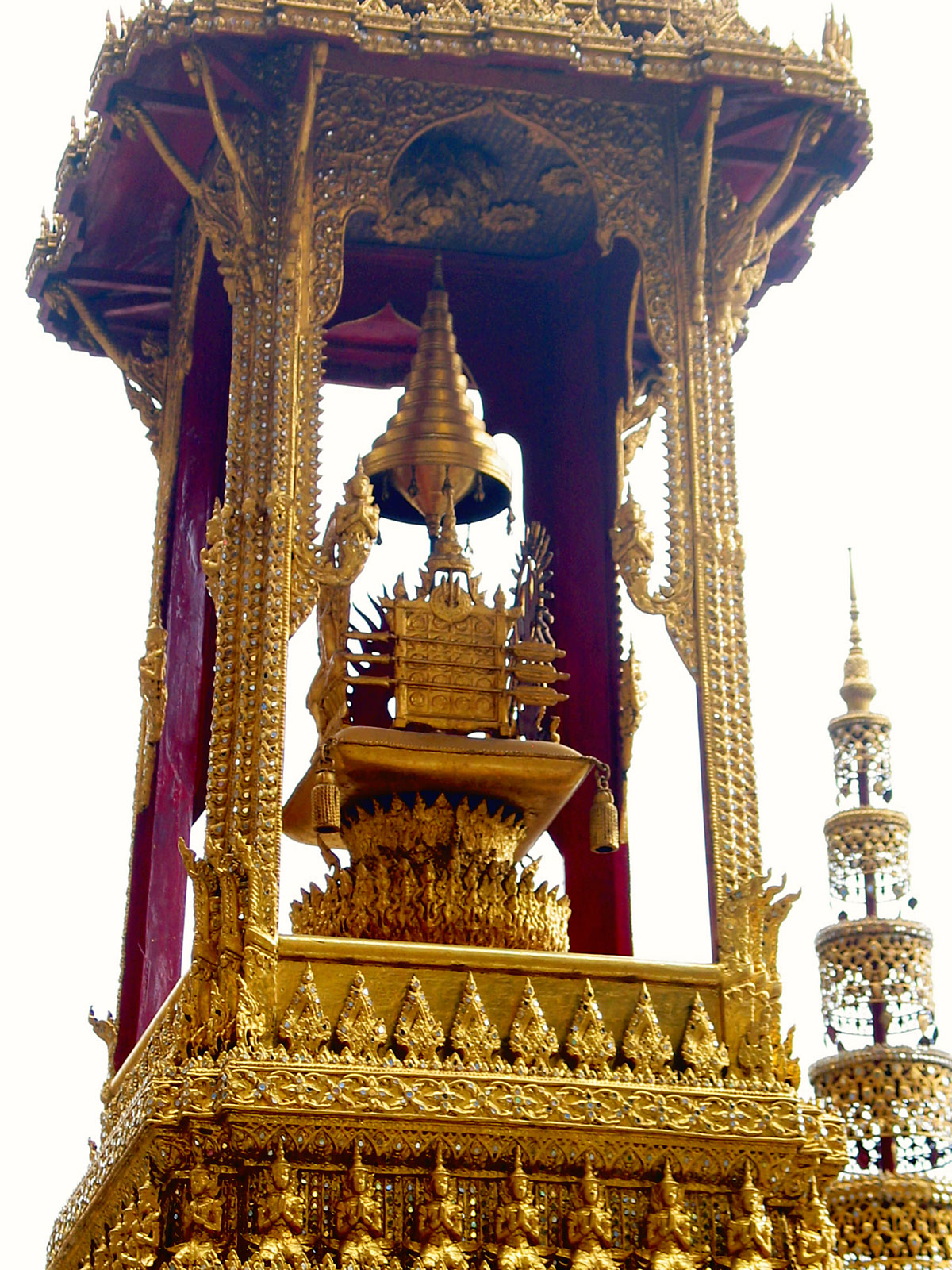
Insignia of Rama VII

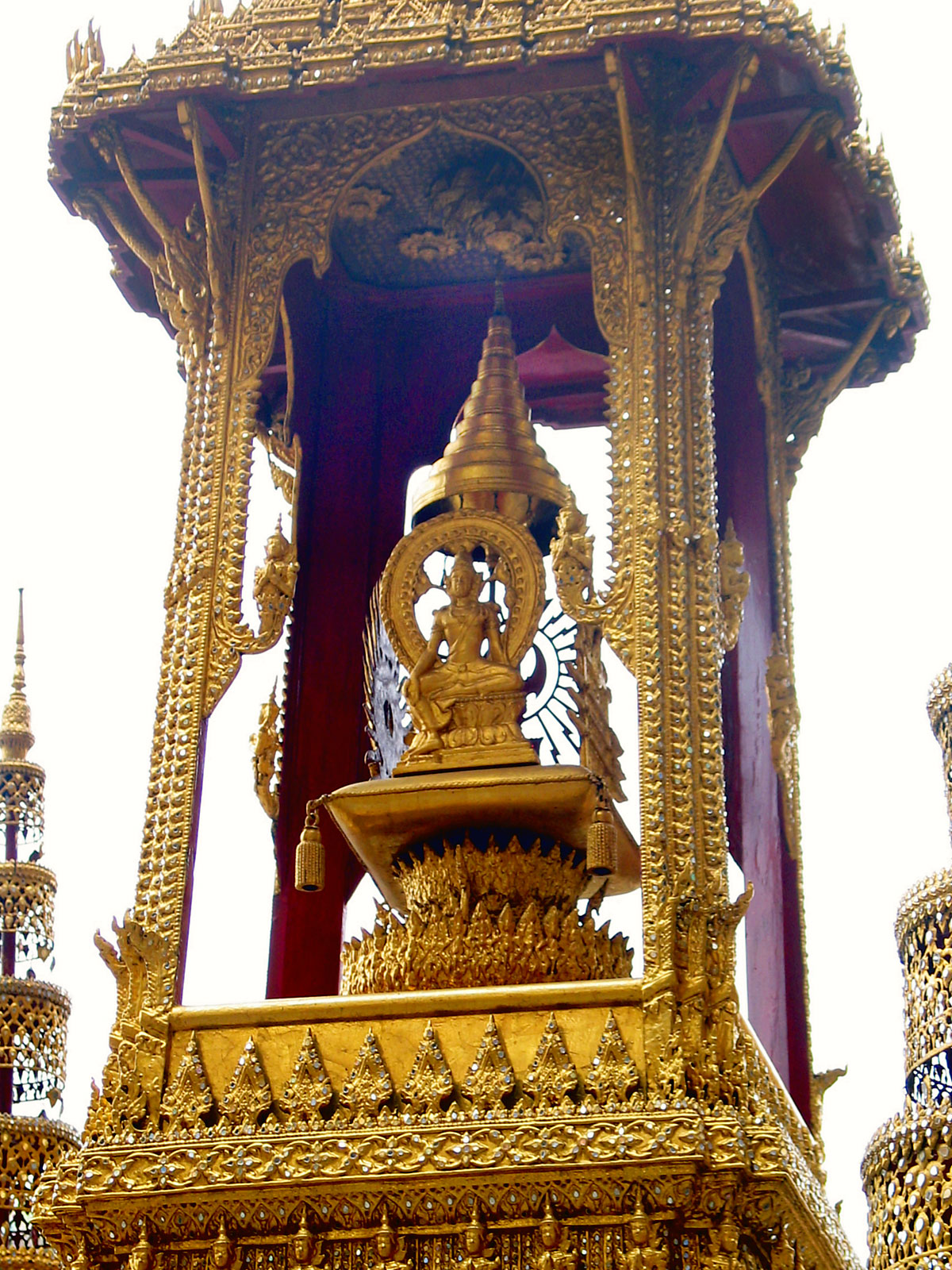
Insignia of Rama VIII

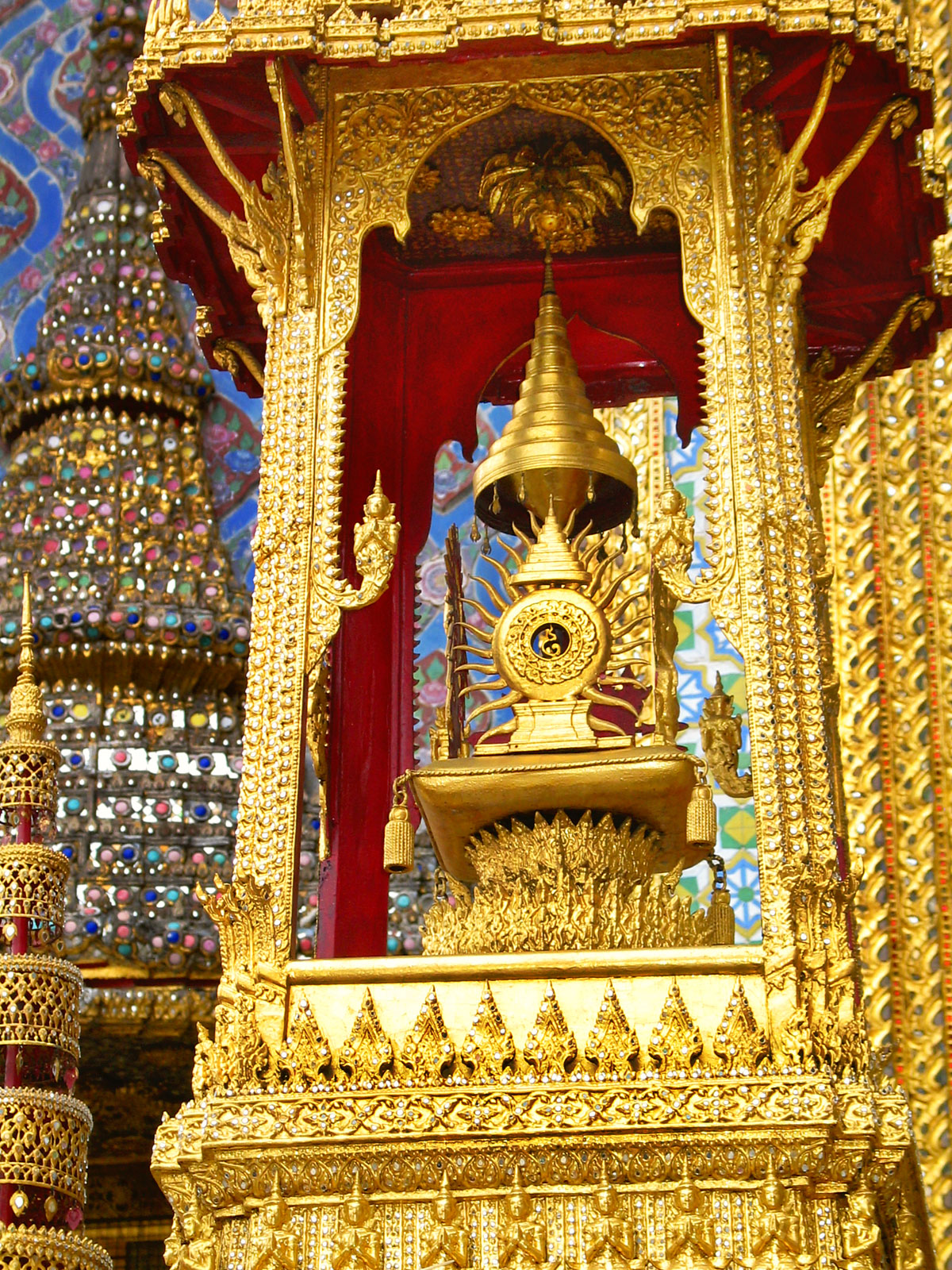
Insignia of Rama IX

=== Phra Chedi Songkhrueang ===
The four decorated chedi called the Phra Chedi Songkhrueang (พระเจดีย์ทรงเครื่อง) are situated behind the Phra Si Rattana Chedi, two on either side of the western porch. The chedi have a square plan with indented corners. The bases are white, and the top part is decorated in gold leaf and coloured glass. Like the two golden chedi, these were moved to their present position to make way for the expansion of the terrace.

=== Model of Angkor Wat ===
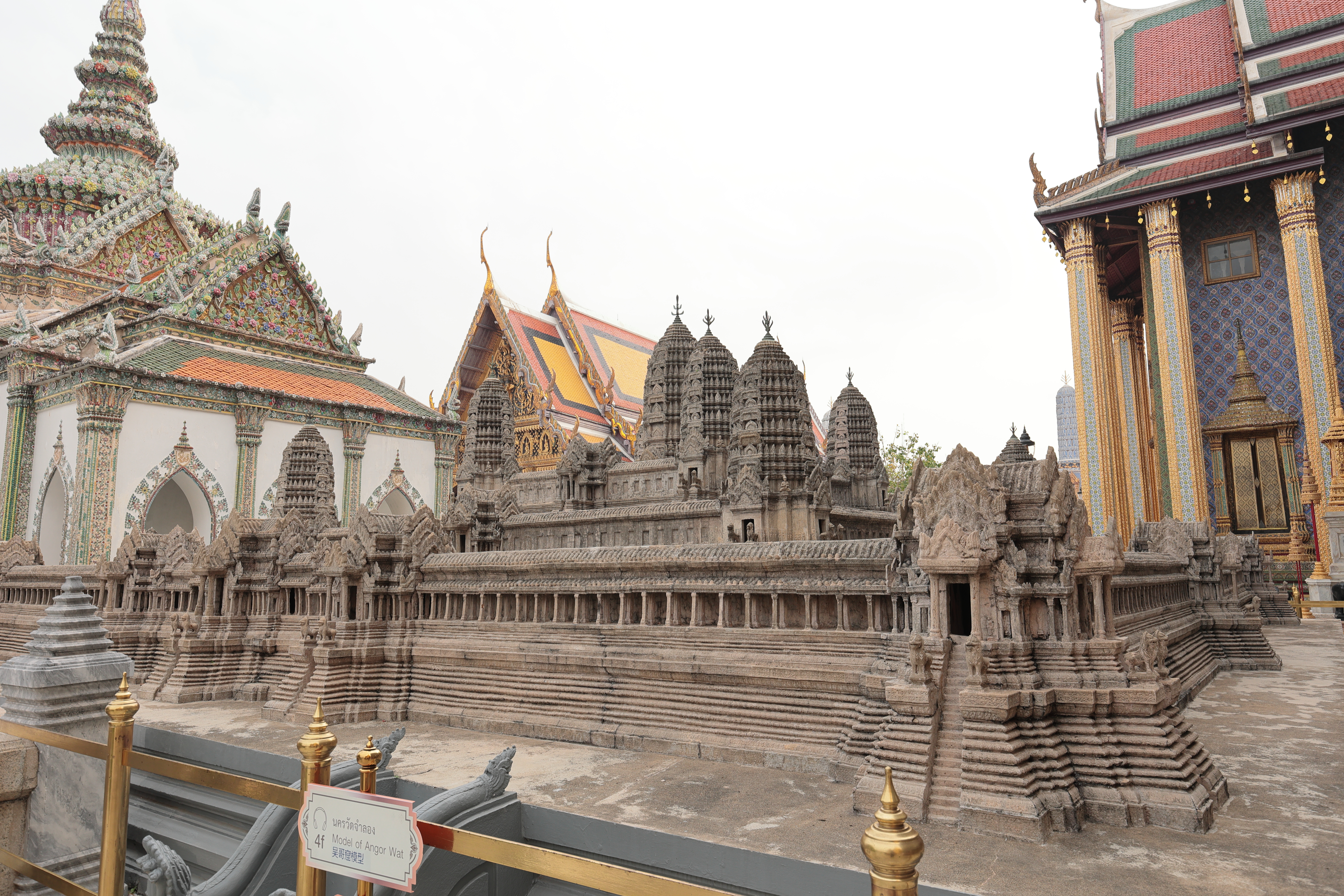
The model of Angkor Wat, made at the orders of Rama IV

The model of Angkor Wat was borne out of an idea of Rama IV of moving one of the Khmer temples to Bangkok. However this proved unfeasible, so he ordered that a detailed scale model of Angkor Wat be made instead. The ancient Khmer temple complex had recently been rediscovered in Cambodia—then under Siamese suzerainty—in 1860. This highly detailed model was installed to the north of the Phra Mondop.

=== Mythological figures ===
Seven pairs of mythological figures decorate the terrace, made of bronze and gilded with gold leaf. These are half-animal half-human celestial beings which, according to tradition, inhabited the mythical Himavanta forest. They are the Theppaksi, human male upper body with feathered arms, bird lower body, human feet and holding a sword; Thepnorasi, human male upper body, lion lower body and holding a flower; Singhaphanon, monkey upper body, lion lower body and holding a sceptre; Apsarasingha (Apsonsi), human female upper body and lion lower body; Asurapaksi, giant upper body and bird lower body; Kinnon (kinnara), human male upper body and bird lower body; and the Asurawayuphak, giant upper body, bird lower body and holding a mace.

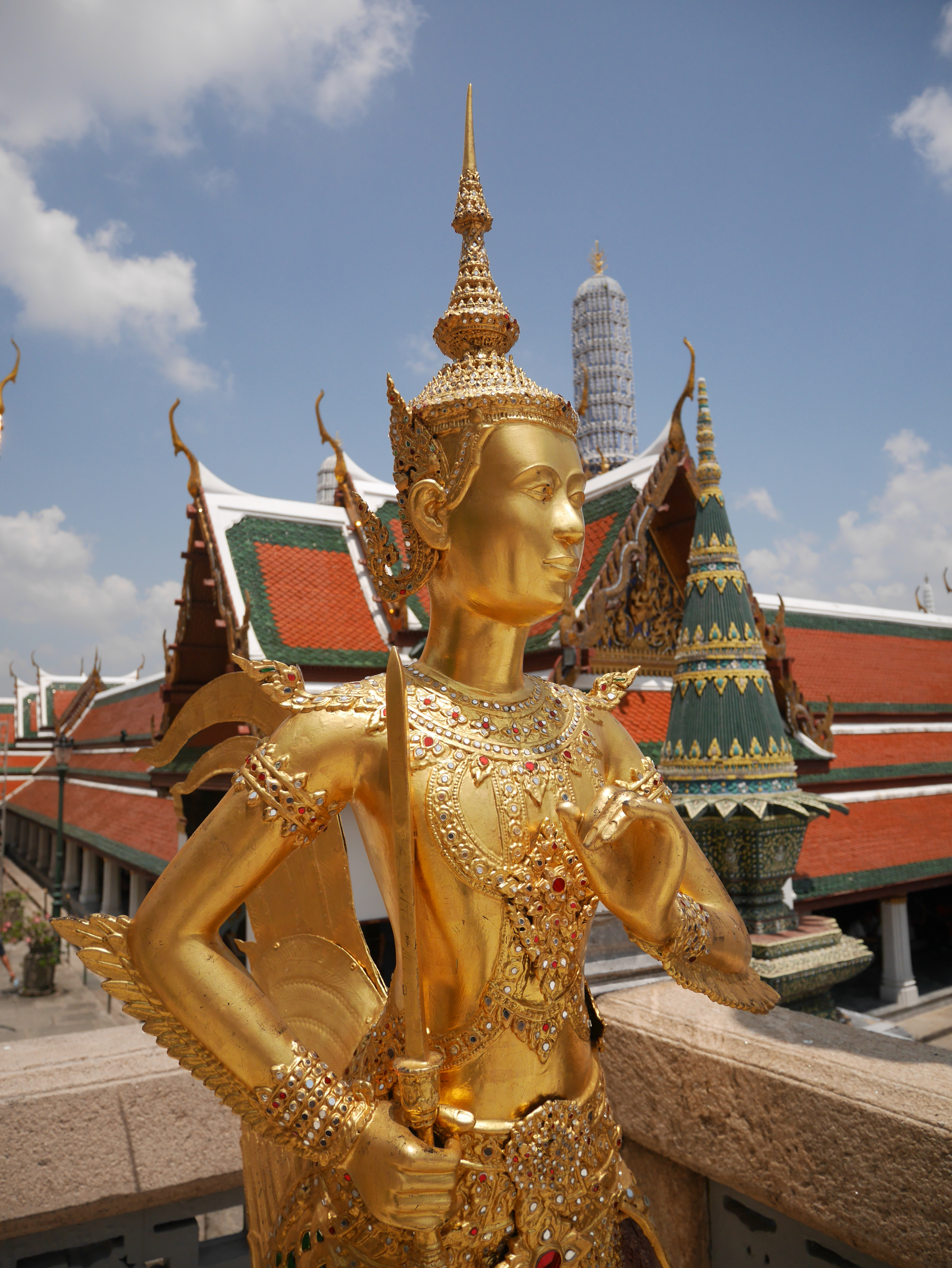
Theppaksi
(เทพปักษี)

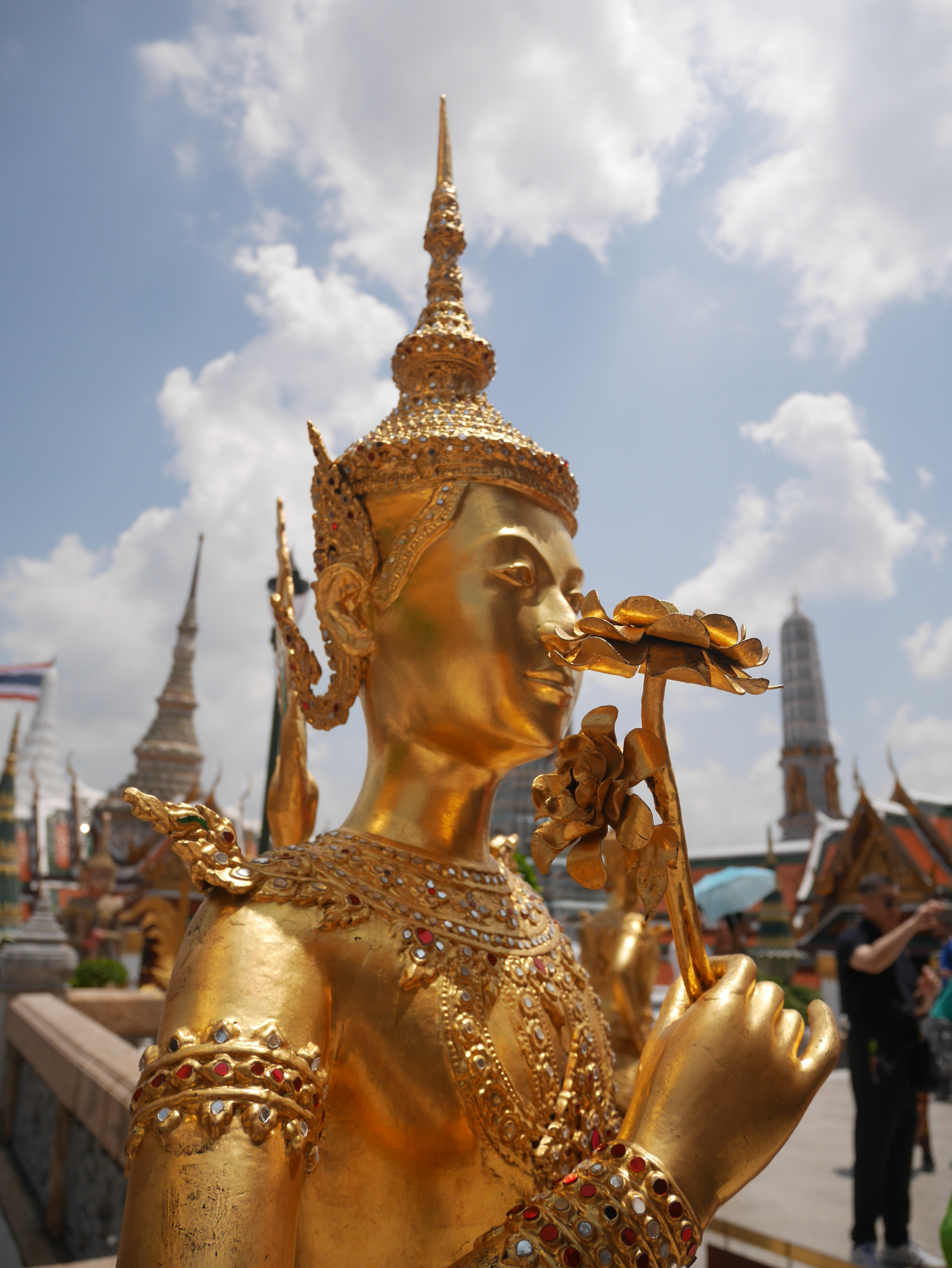
Thepnorasi
(เทพนรสิงห์)

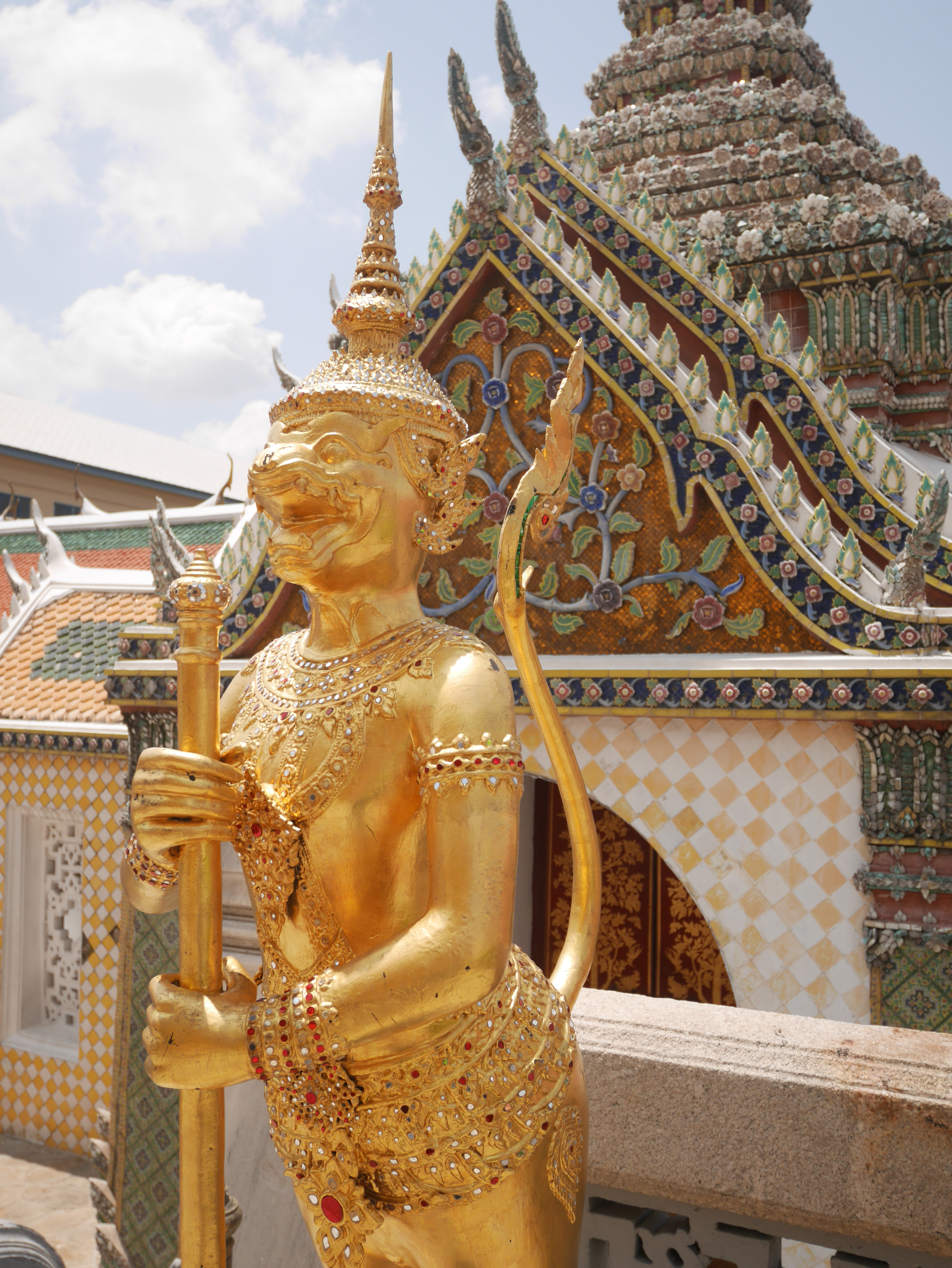
Singhaphanon
(สิงหพานร)

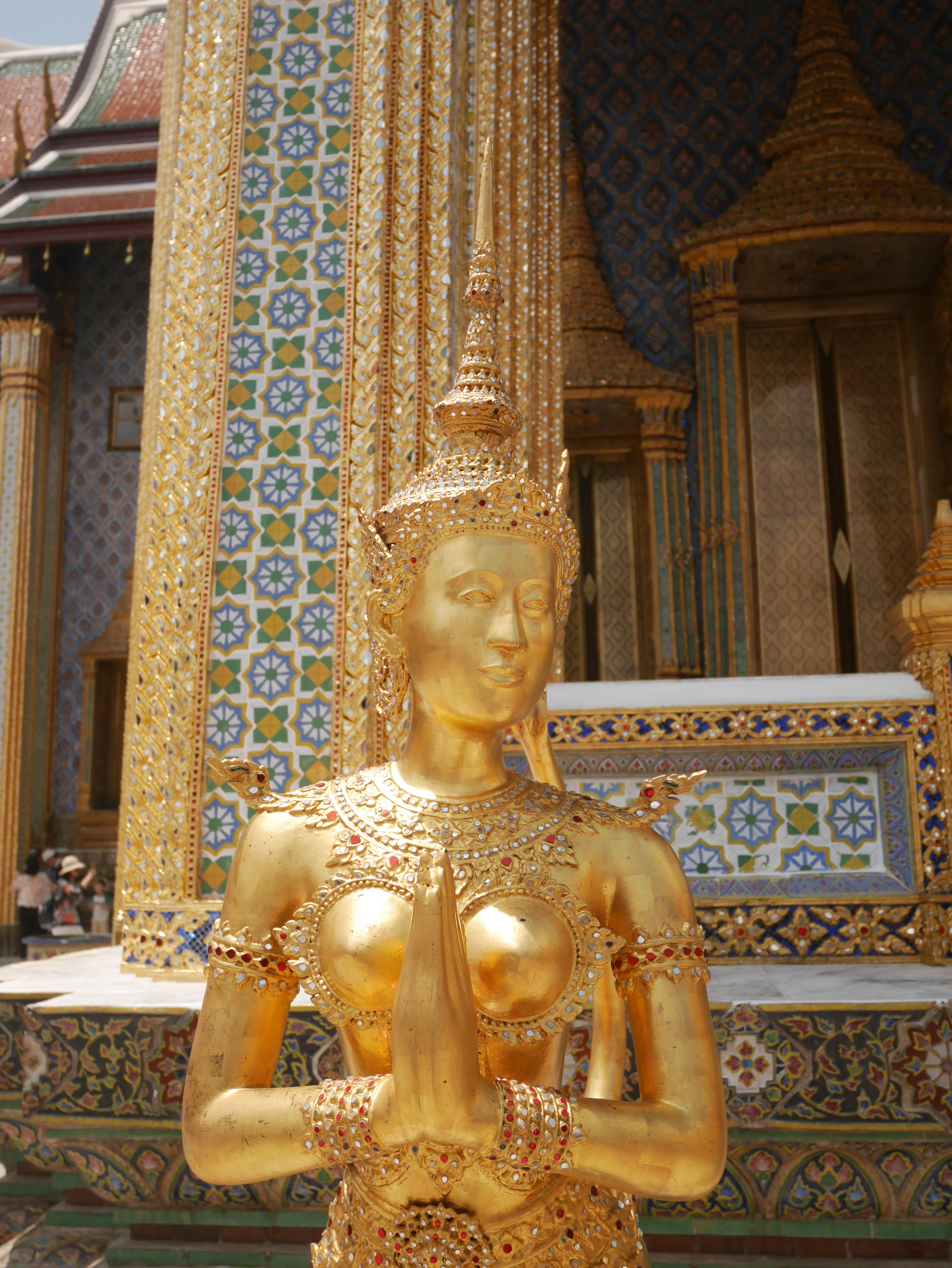
Apsarasingha
(อัปสรสีห์)

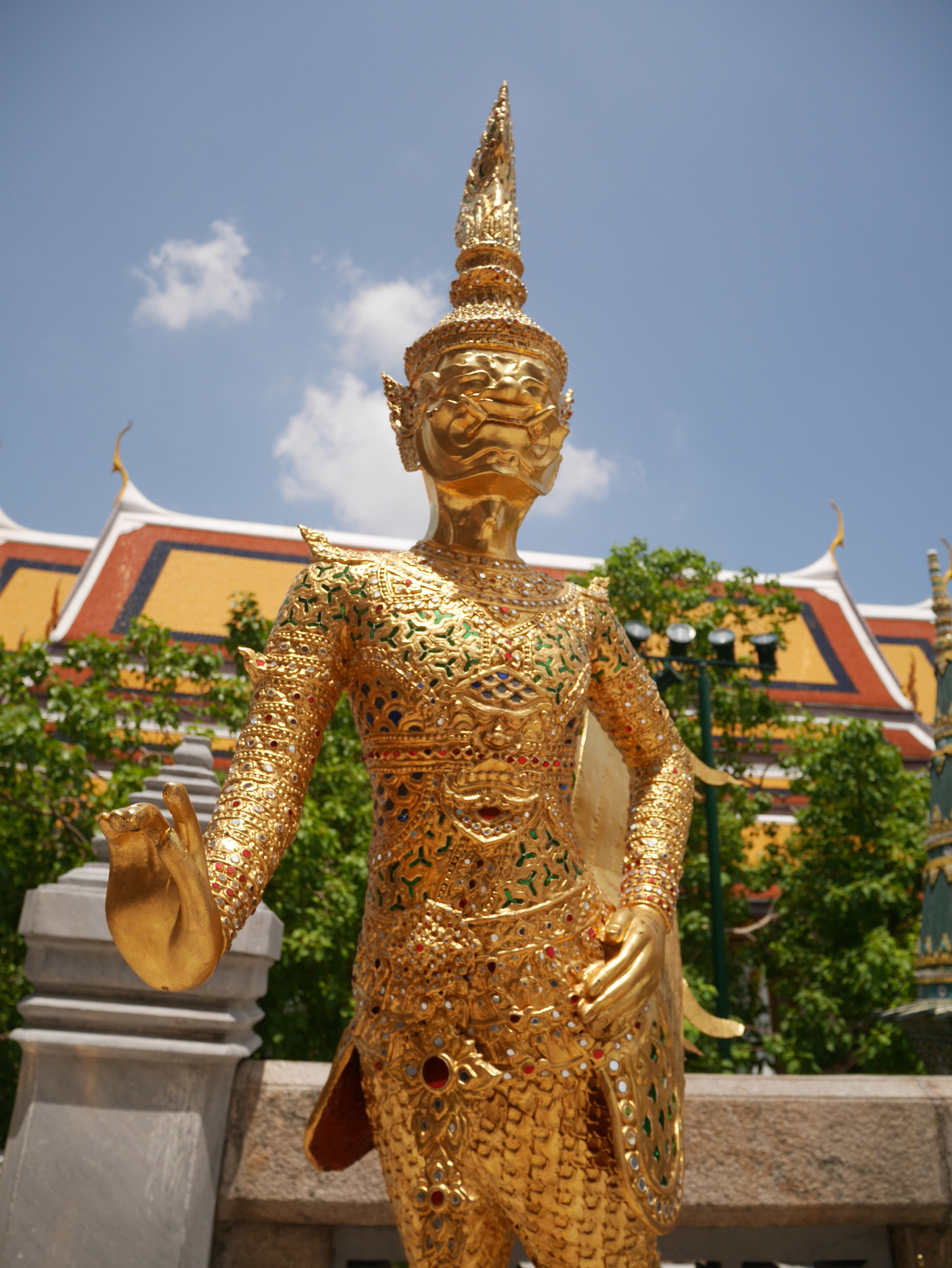
Asuarapaksi
(อสูรปักษี)

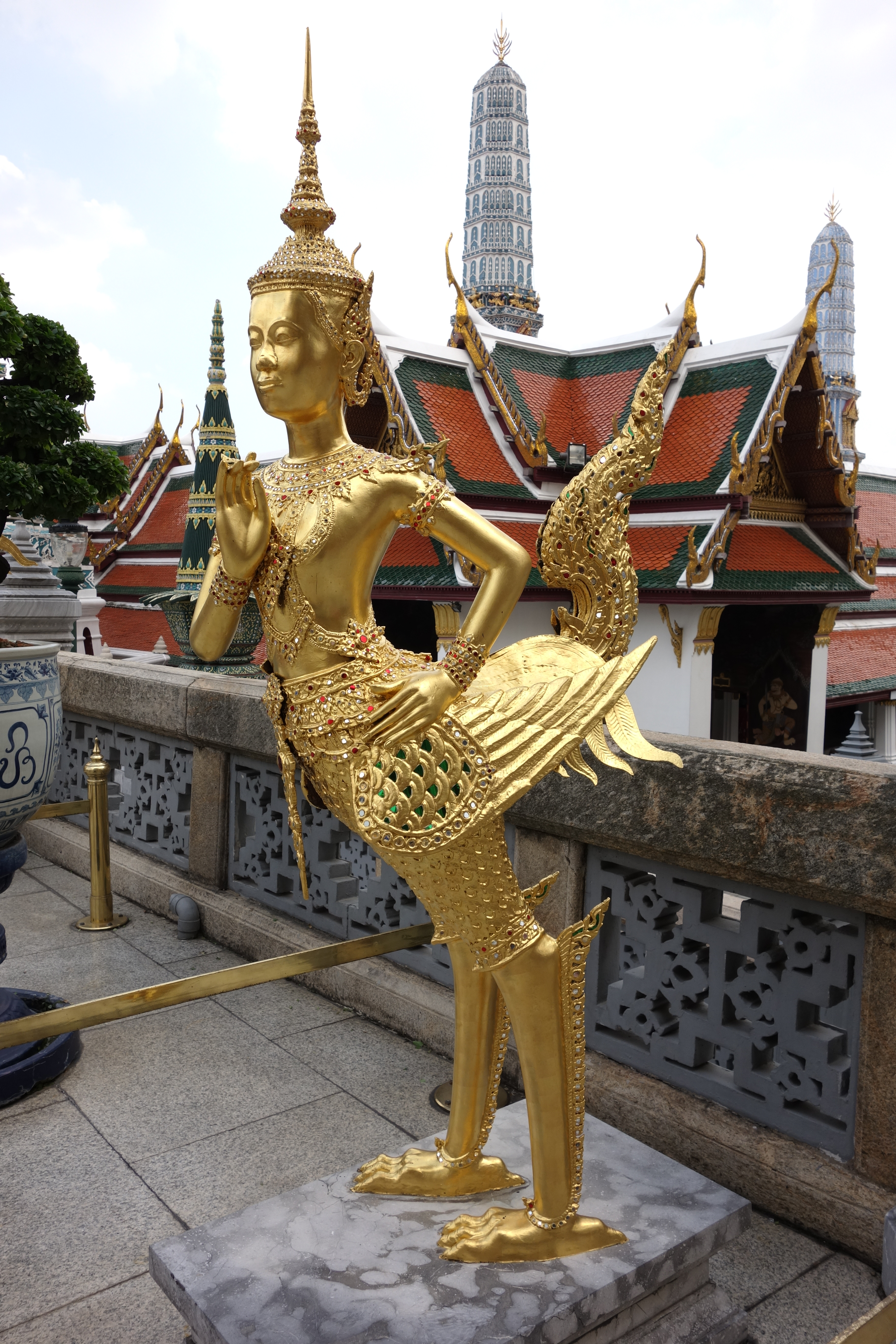
Kinnon
(กินนร)

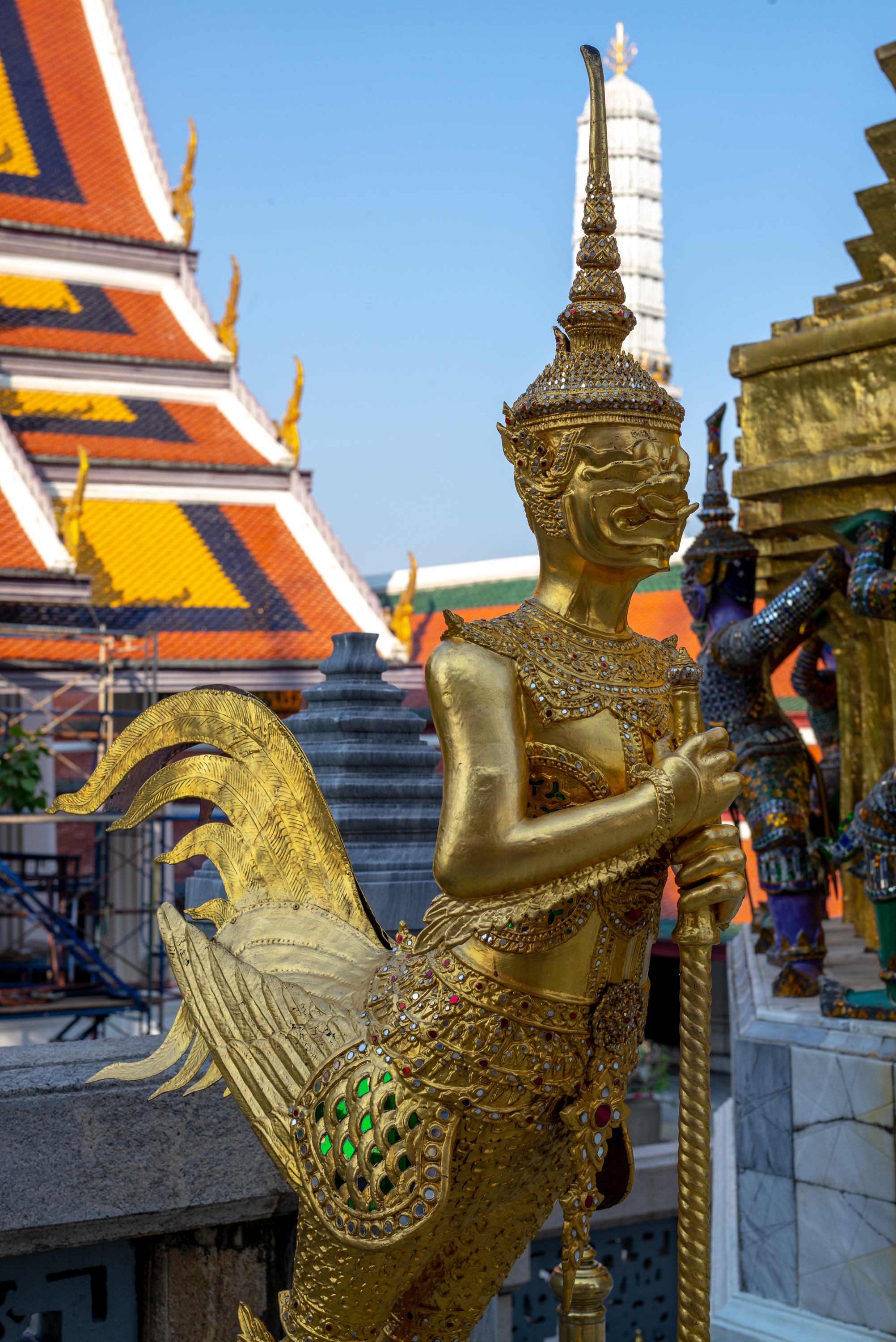
Asurawayuphak
(อสูรวายุภักษ์)

=== Southern porch ===
The southern porch was the former entrance gate to the Phra Mondop; it was probably moved to its present position when the terrace was expanded. The pediment displays the insignia of Rama III, a triple-doored vimana. The doors are made of carved wood depicting two warriors holding a spear and gilded in gold leaf.

=== Western porch ===
The western porch was constructed by Rama IV as an entrance to the expanded terrace. The porch was decorated in coloured ceramics in floral and geometrical designs. In the form of a prasat, the porch's roof has a central spire rising from in the middle.

=== Panom Mak ===
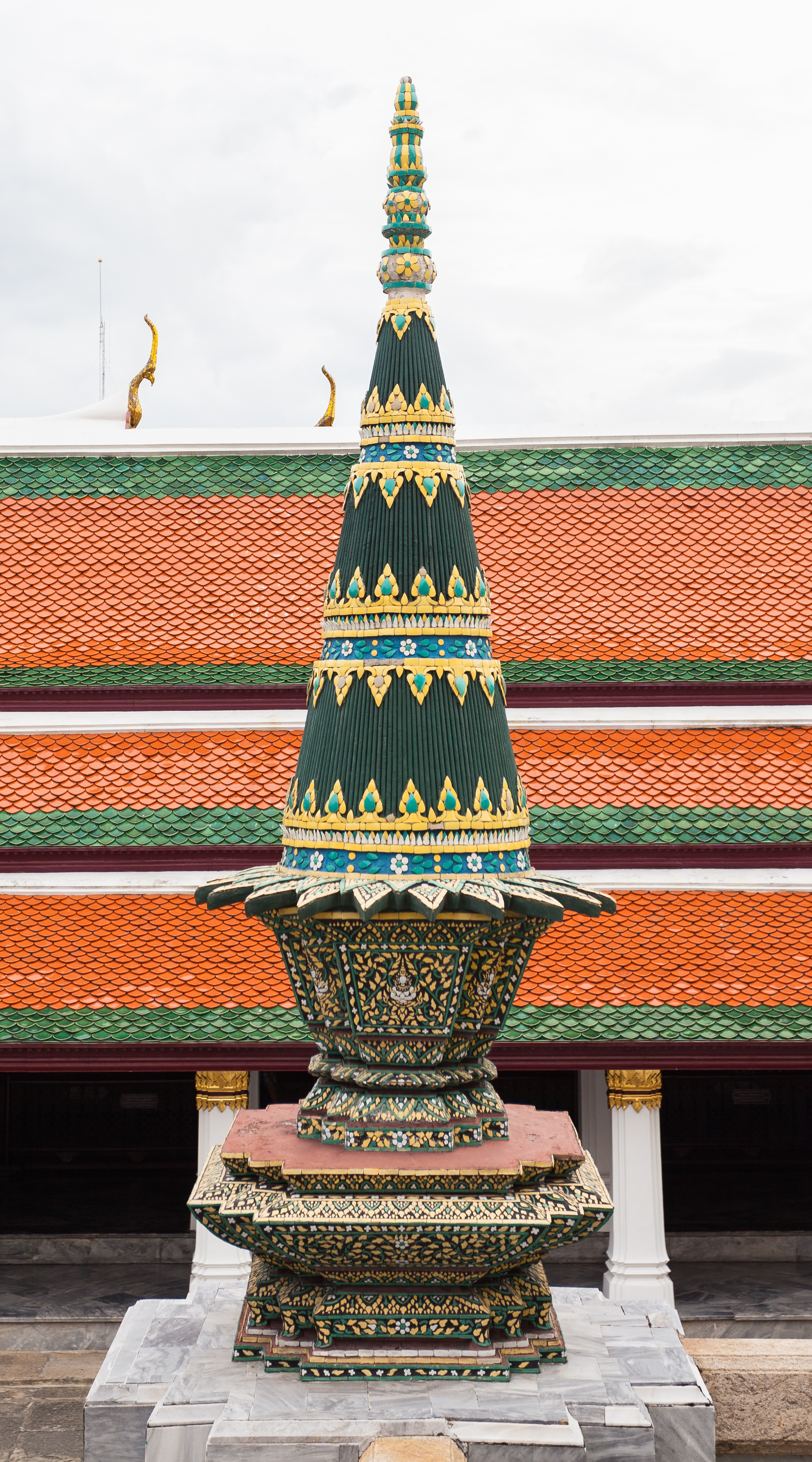
A Panom Mak sculpture, representing traditional offerings made of banana leaves and flowers

Panom Mak (พนมหมาก) are eighteen decorative sculptures representing flowers and banana leaves offerings on a tray. They are based on traditional flower arrangements offered to Buddha statues by devotees as an act of making merit. These sculptures are distributed along the eastern and western edges of the terrace. Made of plaster and covered in ceramic tiles of various colours, they were added to the terrace by Rama V.

=== Phra Sawet Kudakhan Wihan Yot ===
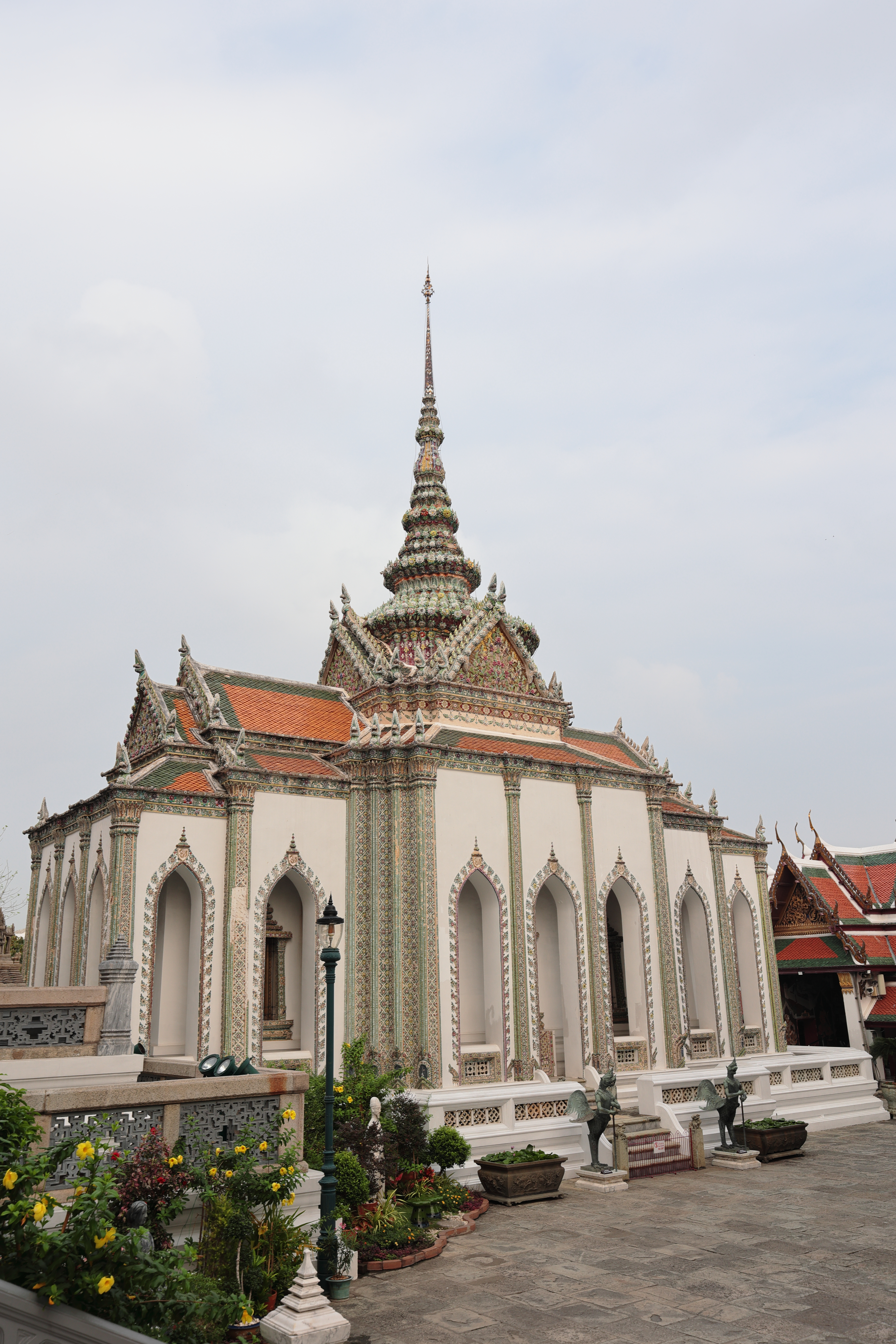
Phra Sawet Kudakhan Wihan Yot contains many important Buddha images.

The Phra Sawet Kudakhan Wihan Yot (พระเศวตกุฏาคารวิหารยอด) or the Wihan Yot extends northwards from the terrace. The building, a vihara, serves as a Buddha image hall, and was first built by Rama III to house many important Buddha images. The building has a cruciform plan and is topped in the middle of the roof with a tall spire in the form of a crown. The spire is decorated with coloured porcelain in floral designs. The top of the window arches display the royal cypher of Rama V under a crown; this indicates that vihara was restored by the King. Bronze figures of Tantima birds—birds with a human torso and Garuda head—guard the entrances on the west and east sides. The doors of the vihara feature mother-of-pearl inlay and were taken from Wat Pa Mok in Ang Thong Province.

== Ho Phra Khanthararat ==
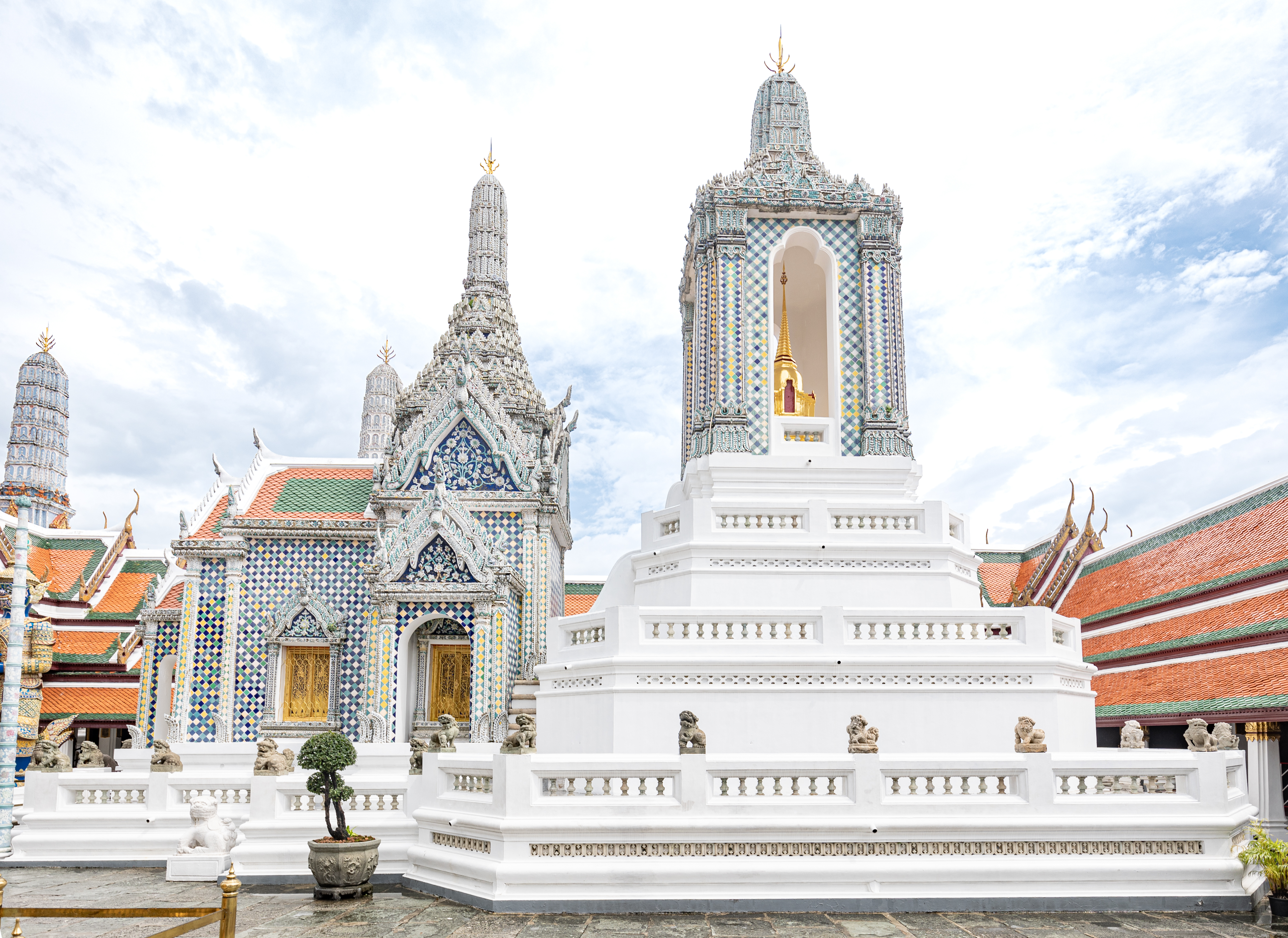
The Ho Phra Khanthararat (Left) & Phra Mondop Yot Prang (Right)

The Ho Phra Khanthararat (หอพระคันธารราษฎร์) shares its base with the Phra Mondop Yot Prang (พระมณฑปยอดปรางค์). Built on the orders of Rama IV, both are situated on the southeastern side of the Ubosot. A Buddha shrine, the small structure was built to house the Phra Khanthararat image. The Buddha image is associated with the Royal Ploughing Ceremony. The image was originally cast in bronze by Rama I. Later, Rama IV had it gilded in gold and a large diamond embedded in its forehead. The Ho Phra Khanthararat is decorated on the exterior with green, blue and yellow tiles. The entrance is from the north with a door portico extending out from the front of the hall. Behind the portico, the rectangular hall is topped with a prang spire, and the four pediments below it are decorated with floral designs. The carved doors and windows of the shrine depict sheaves of rice, fish and shrimp to represent the fecundity of the nation.

== Phra Mondop Yot Prang ==
The Phra Mondop Yot Prang sits on a taller platform behind the Ho Phra Khanthararat. The octagonal base is topped with a mondop pavilion and spire. Inside the pavilion is a small golden stupa. The stupa was obtained by Rama IV when he was still a monk and contained important Buddhist relics. Miniature stone sculptures of Chinese guardian lions surround the walls of both shrines.

== Bell Tower ==
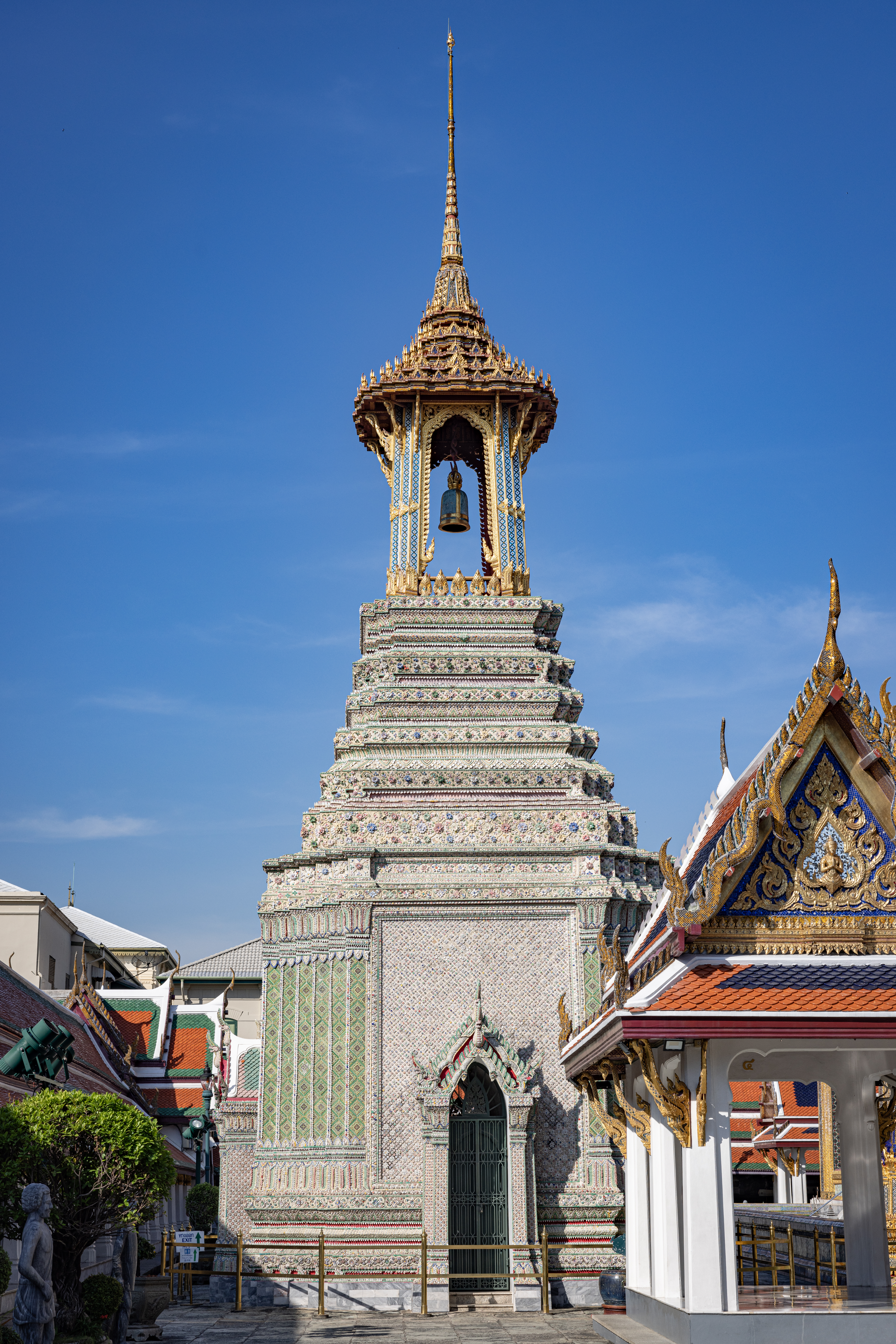
The Bell Tower contains only one bell.

The Bell Tower, or Ho Rakhang (หอระฆัง), is located to the south of the complex. The first tower was built by Rama I to house a single bell. Rama IV ordered it to be completely rebuilt. This reconstruction was completed just in time for the centenary of Bangkok in 1882. The tower has an octagonal base, with four doors and protruding porticoes on each side. Inside there are steps leading up to the bell. The bell is hung underneath a mondop-style spire. The entire structure is covered in coloured porcelain in floral and geometrical designs. The bell is only rung at the investiture of the supreme patriarch.

== Ho Phra Nak ==
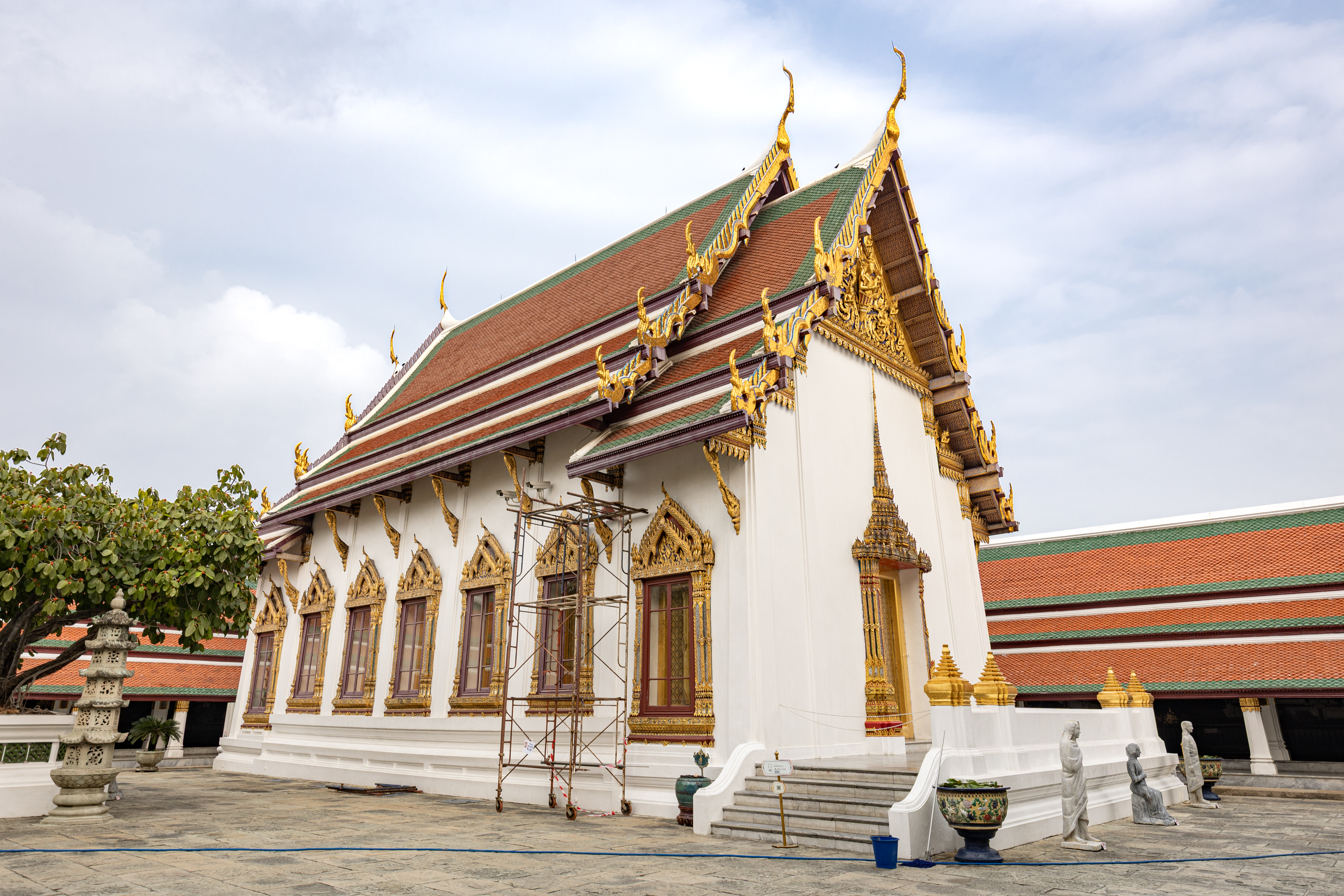
The Ho Phra Nak

The Ho Phra Nak (หอพระนาก) is a royal mausoleum on the northwestern side of the temple. It was previously a Buddha image hall and was built by Rama I to house the sacred Phra Nak Buddha image from Ayutthaya, which was made of gold and copper. Even though the image was eventually moved to the Wihan Yot, the name remained. The hall is rectangular, with an entrance hall on the east side. The roof is covered in green and orange tiles. Inside, the hall is divided into seven rooms. Ashes and remains of members of the royal family are kept here. Formerly, only the ashes of female royalty was kept here, as was the tradition at Ayutthaya. Later, however, the ashes of many senior male members were also kept here as well. Notably, it contains the ashes of all the viceroys of the Chakri dynasty and their princely descendants. These ashes are kept in hundreds of individual gold urns.

== Ho Phra Monthiantham ==
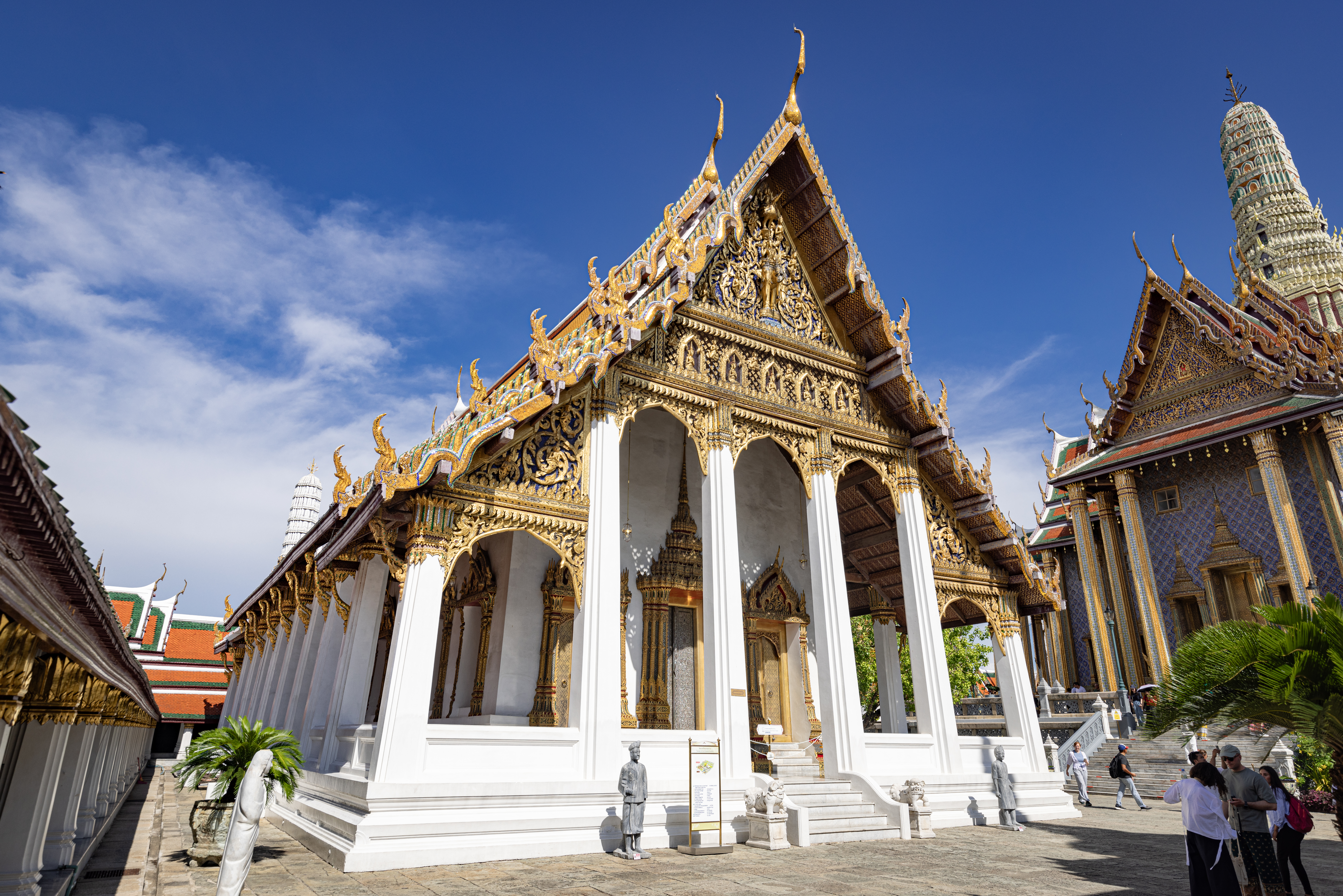
The Ho Phra Monthiantham is a scripture hall and supplementary library.

The Ho Phra Monthiantham (หอมณเฑียรธรรม) is a scripture hall on the north-eastern side of the temple. Its construction was paid for by the viceroy Maha Sura Singhanat, brother of Rama I. The hall is rectangular, surrounded on all sides with columns supporting a four-level roof. The entrance door is on the west side. The roof is covered in yellow and orange tiles. The pediment of the hall depicts the god Indra astride Airavata, the three-headed elephant. The inside of the hall is decorated with wood carvings of Hanuman, the symbol of the viceroy. The hall contains two mother-of-pearl inlay bookcases containing the Tripitaka. Today, the hall is also used for Buddhist sermons on Buddhist holy days. Formerly, the hall was used as a classroom for novice monks learning religious texts and as an exam room for monks.

== Row of prang ==
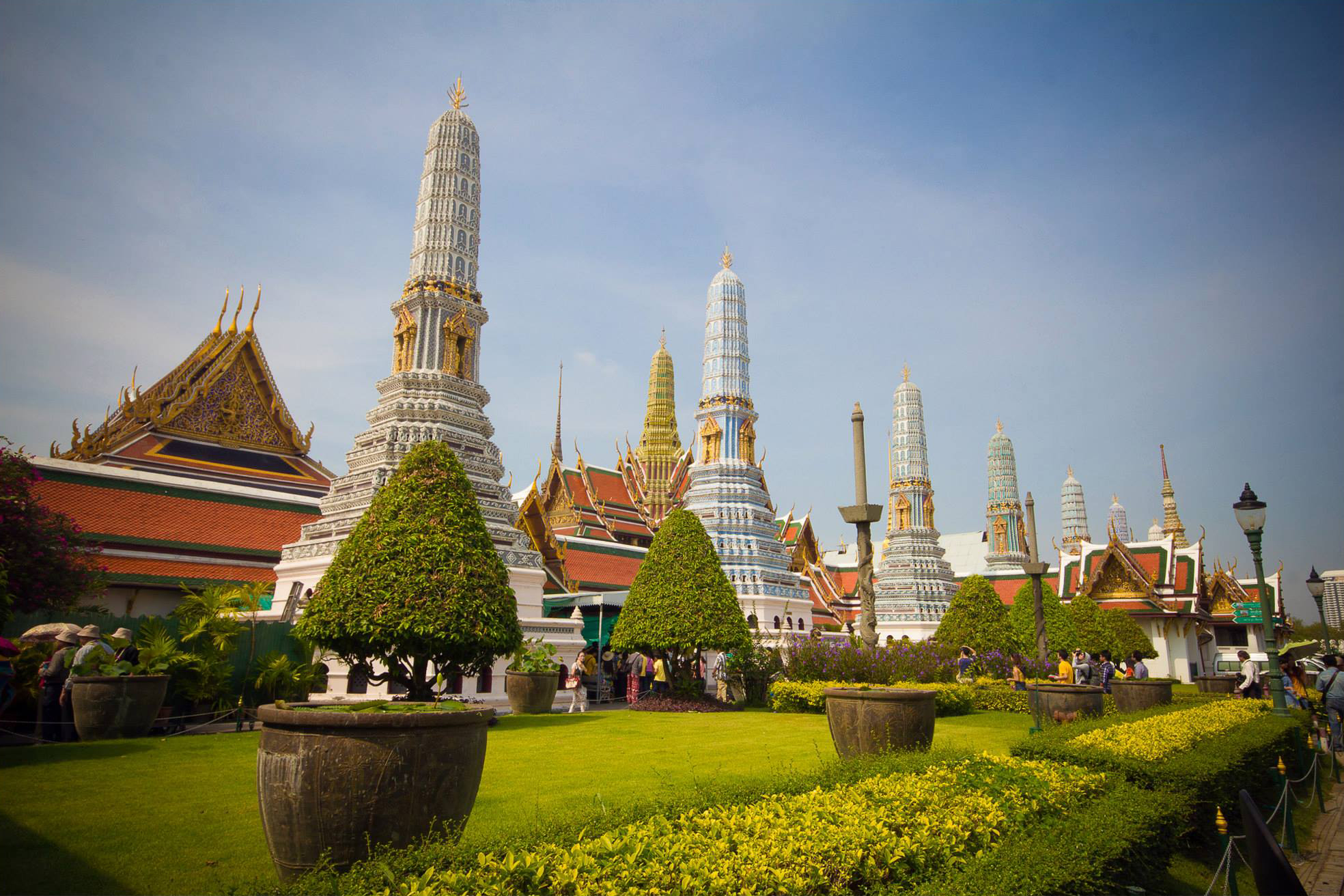
The row of eight prang as seen from outside the wall of the temple

The row of eight prang, formally known as Phra Atsda Maha Chedi (พระอัษฎามหาเจดีย์), was built by Rama I and later covered in delicate coloured porcelain by Rama III. These prang are typical of the Rattanakosin period, being taller and thinner than those of Ayutthaya. Each spire has an octagonal base with brick foundations, with the decorations made of plaster. Each has four doorways with figures of golden standing devas on each side, above them are a band of supporting yaksha or giants. The prang stood mostly outside the complex, along the eastern length of the temple wall. In the reign of King Rama IV, the temple wall was enlarged and two of the prang were enclosed inside the temple.

Each of the prang represents a different aspect of Buddhism. The prang are arranged from north to south and are differentiated by their colours: the Phra Sammasamphuttha Mahachedi in white is dedicated to the Gautama Buddha. The Phra Satthampariyat Wara Mahachedi in blue is dedicated to the Dharma (Buddhist scriptures). The Phra Ariyasong Sawok Mahachedi in pink is dedicated to the Bhikkhus (male Buddhist monastics). The Phra Ariya Sawok Phiksunee Sangha Mahachedi in green is dedicated to the Bhikkhunīs (female Buddhist monastics). The Phra Patchek Phothisamphuttha Mahachedi in purple is dedicated to the Pratyekabuddha (those who have attained Enlightenment but did not preach). The Phra Borom Chakrawadiraja Mahachedi in pale blue is dedicated to the Chakravarti (the universal ruler). The Phra Photisat Krisda Mahachedi in red is dedicated to the Bodhisattvas (the Buddha is his past lives). The Phra Sri Ayametaya Mahachedi in yellow is dedicated to the Maitreya (the future Buddha).

== Ramakien gallery ==
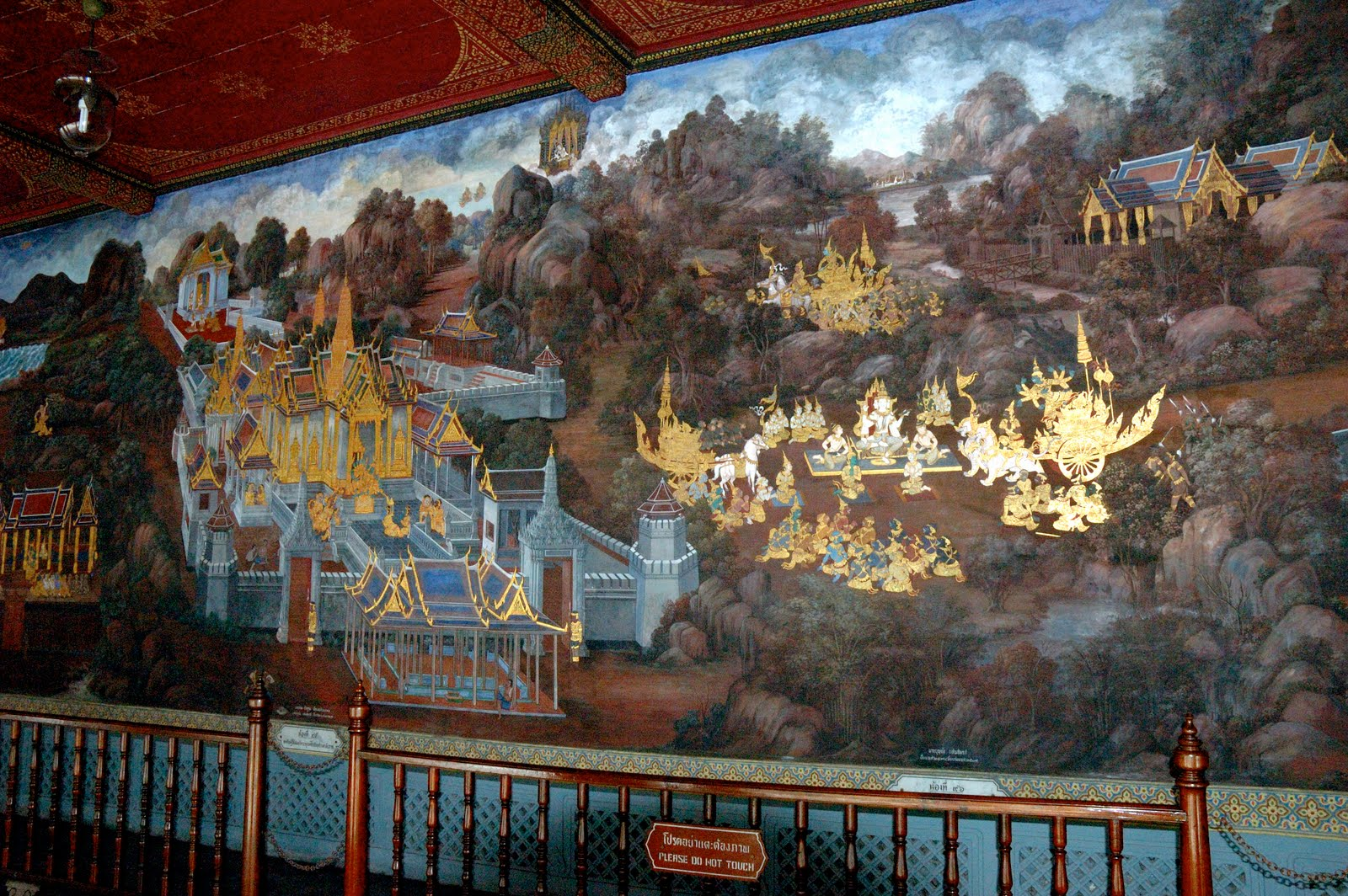
The gallery walls enclose the entire temple, and are entirely covered with murals.

The gallery or Phra Rabiang (พระระเบียง) is a covered corridor, walled on one side, that surrounds the entire temple like a cloister. Murals on the gallery walls depict the entire arc of the Ramakien epic, which is based on the Indian Ramayana. This version was translated and recomposed in Thai poetic form under the supervision of Rama I himself around 1797. The story is divided into five long episodes. The murals were commissioned by Rama I to tell his version of the epic. In fact, the main decorative theme throughout the temple is the Ramakien story. The concept of righteous kingship within the epic has long been recognised within Southeast Asia and has been appropriated by many kings to equate their countries with the legendary city of Ayodhya and the titular hero Rama. The murals were erased and completely repainted by the orders of Rama III. Ever since then they have been frequently restored. The murals along the walls are divided into 178 scenes with abbreviated synopses of the scenes below. The first scene depicted is to the right of Gate No. 7, the Wihan Yot Gate.

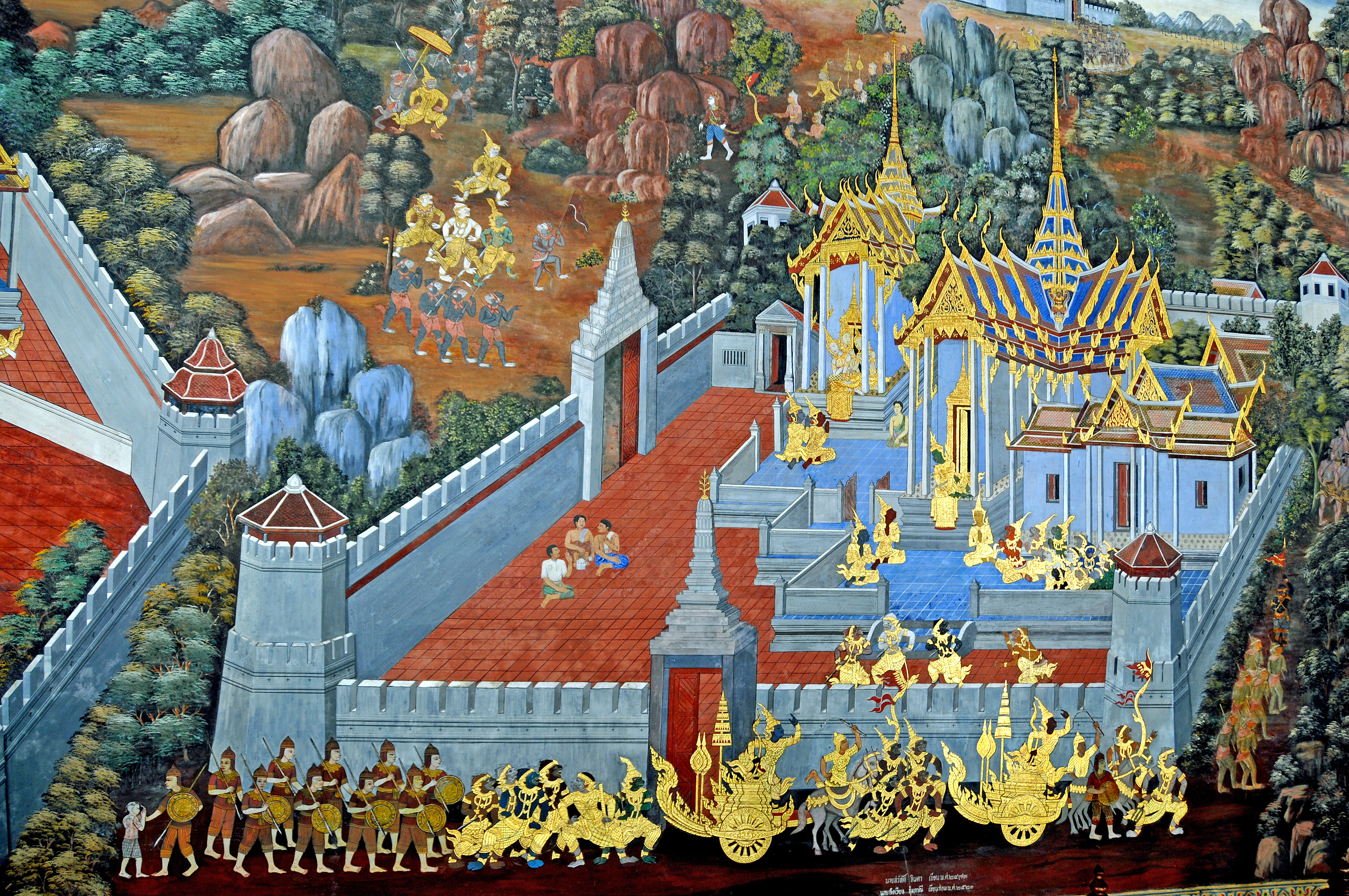

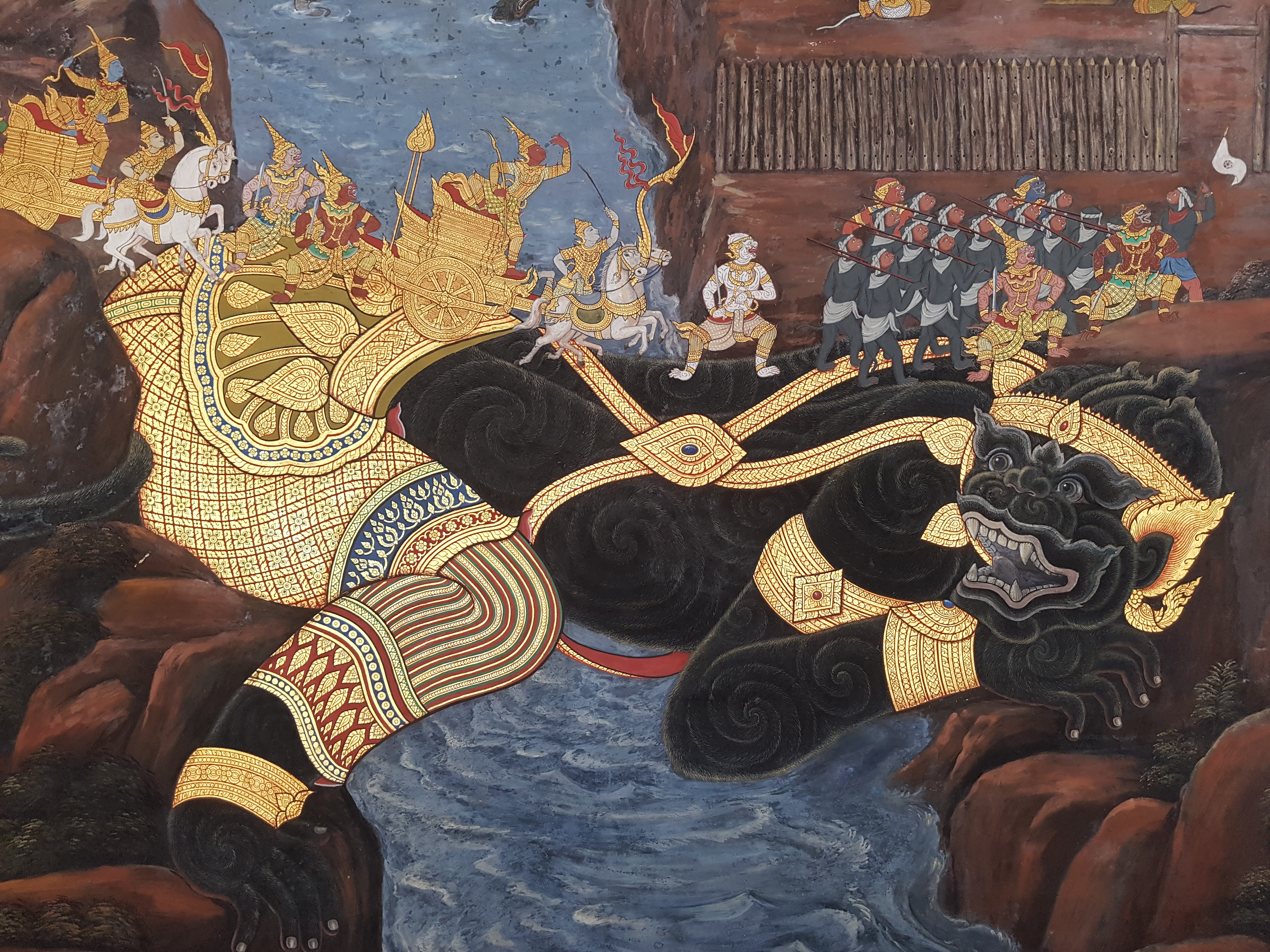

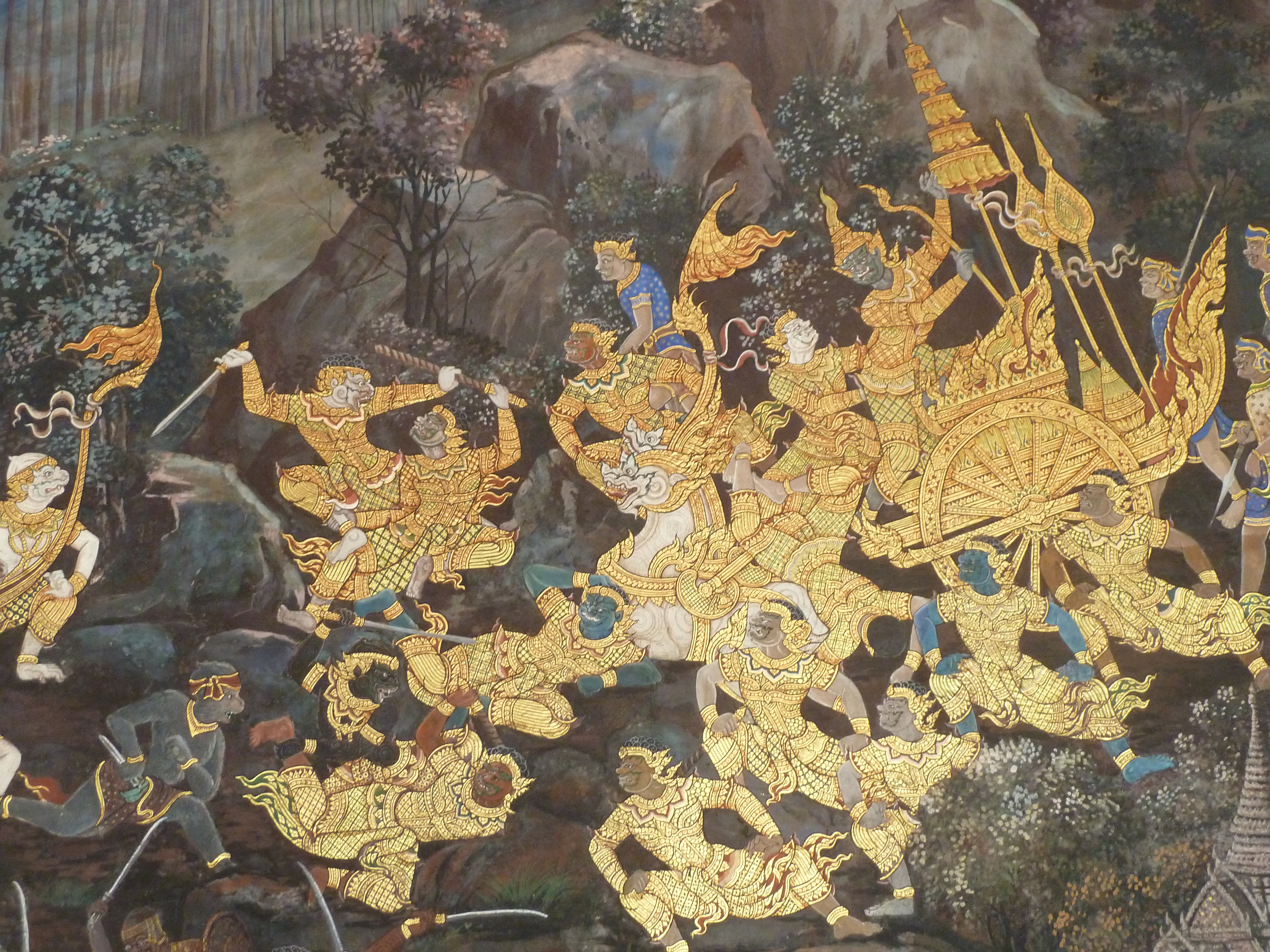

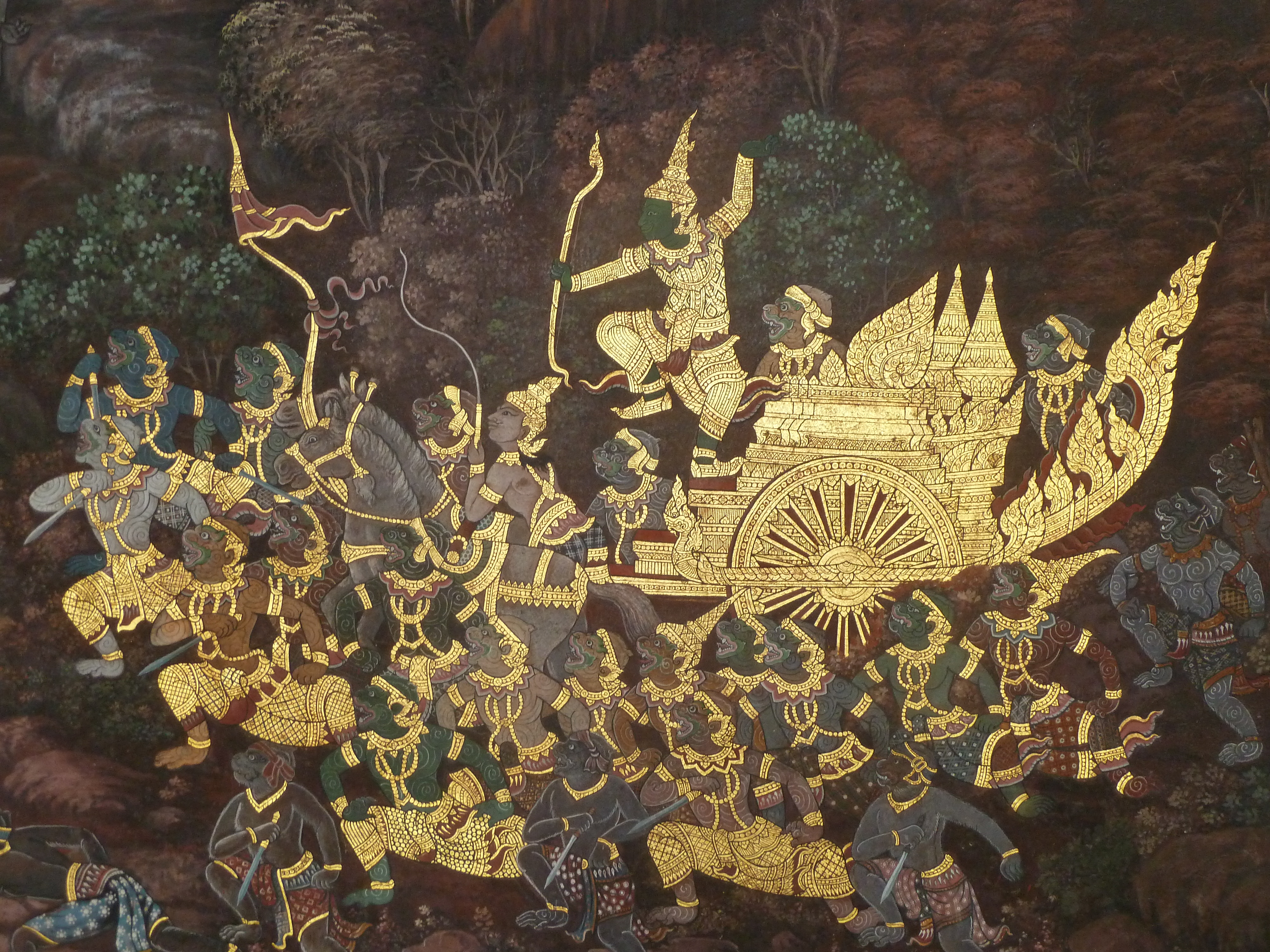

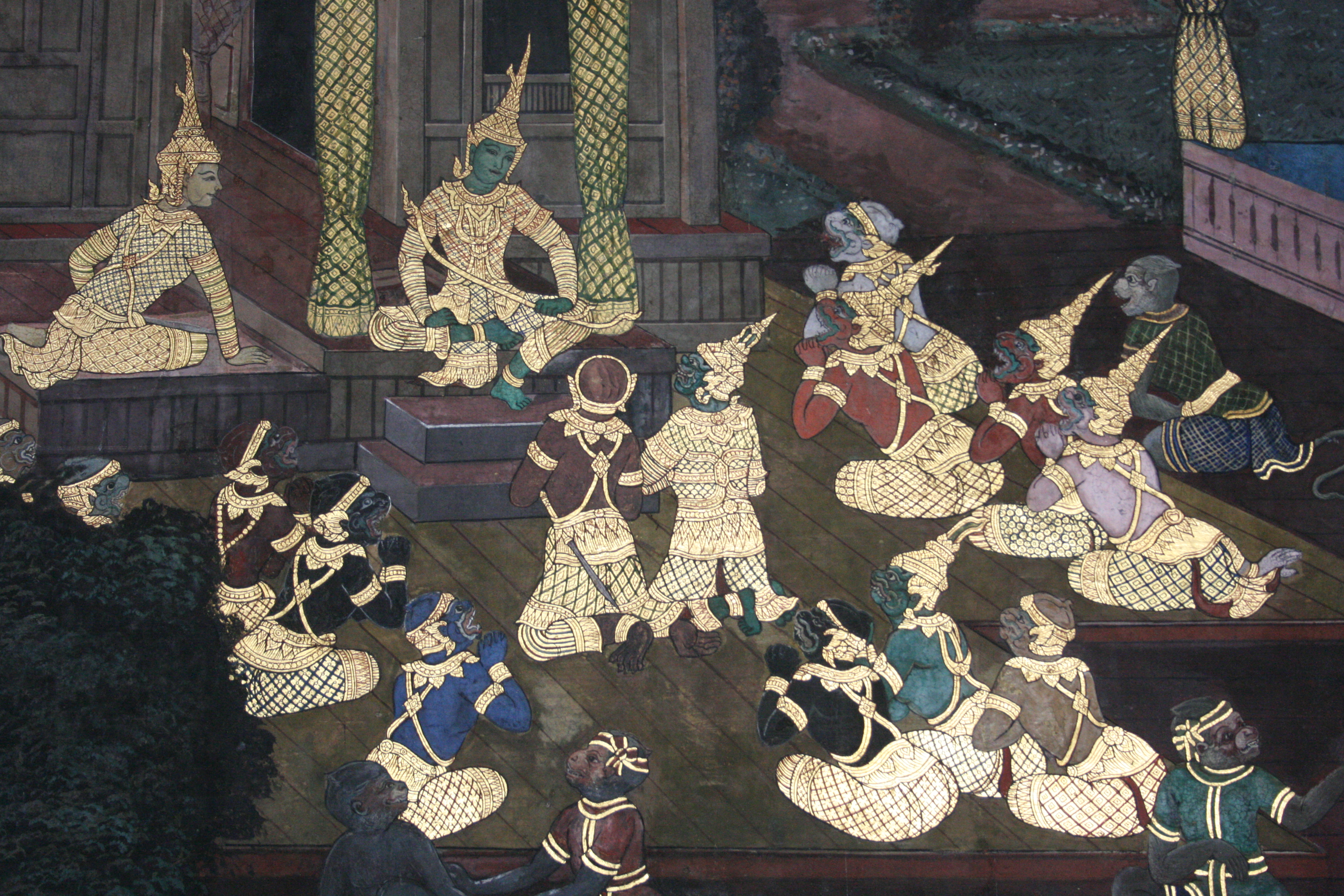

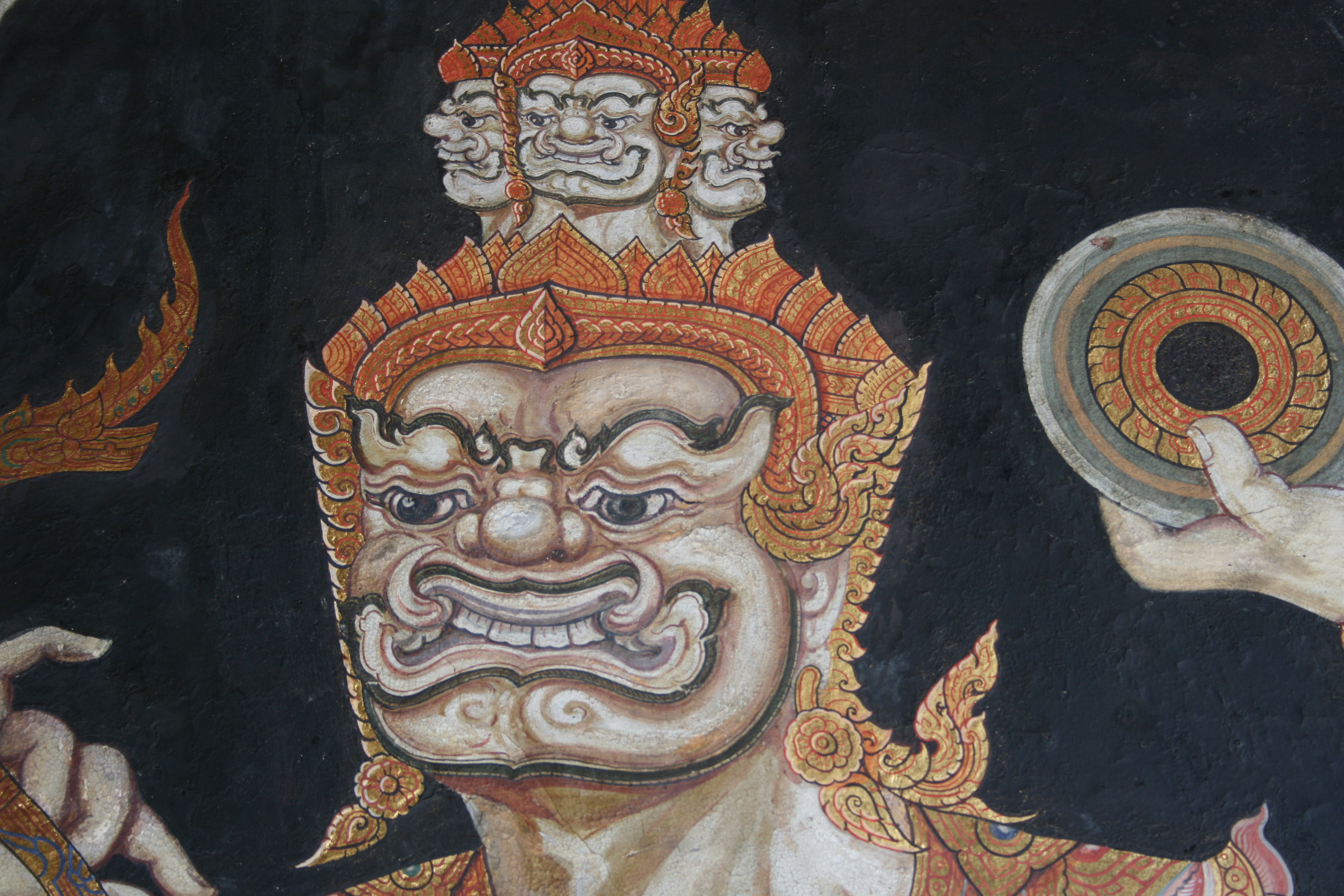

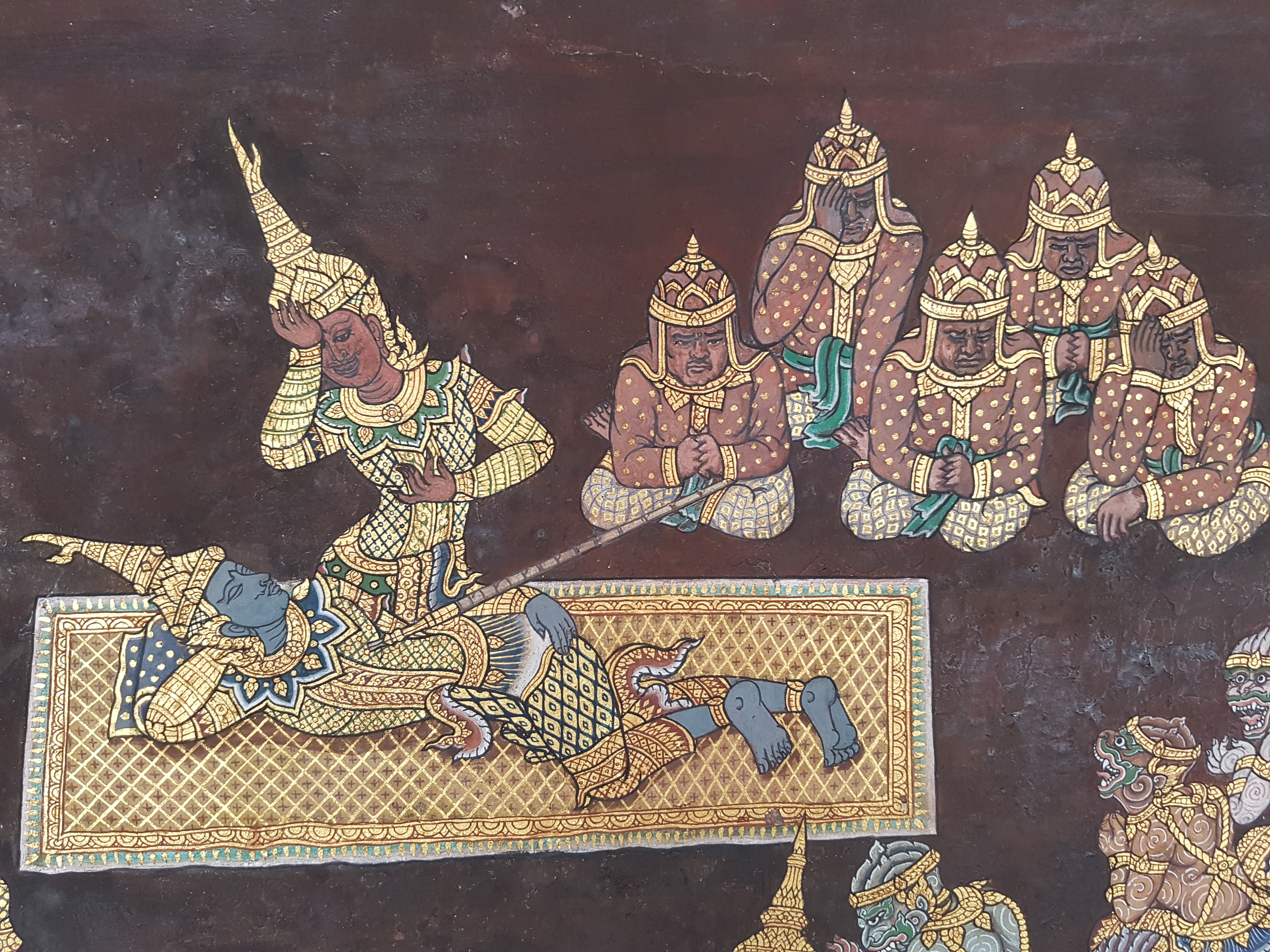

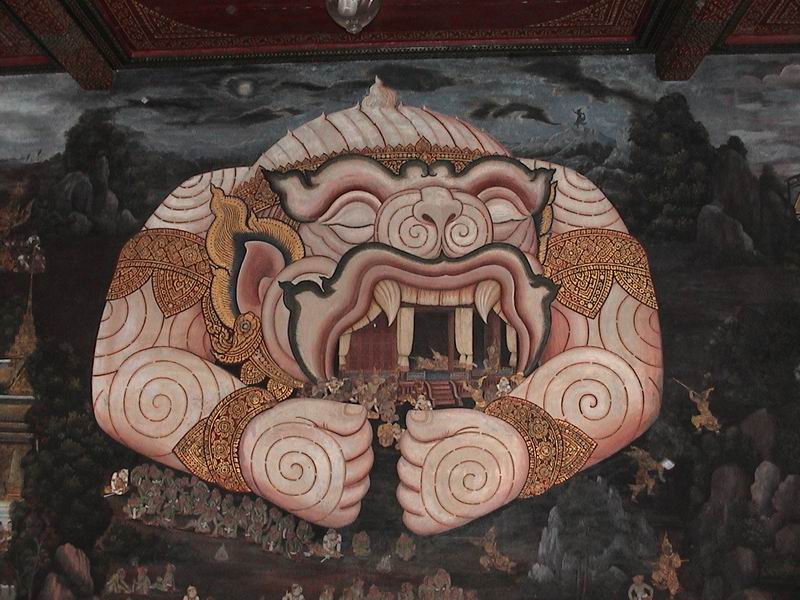

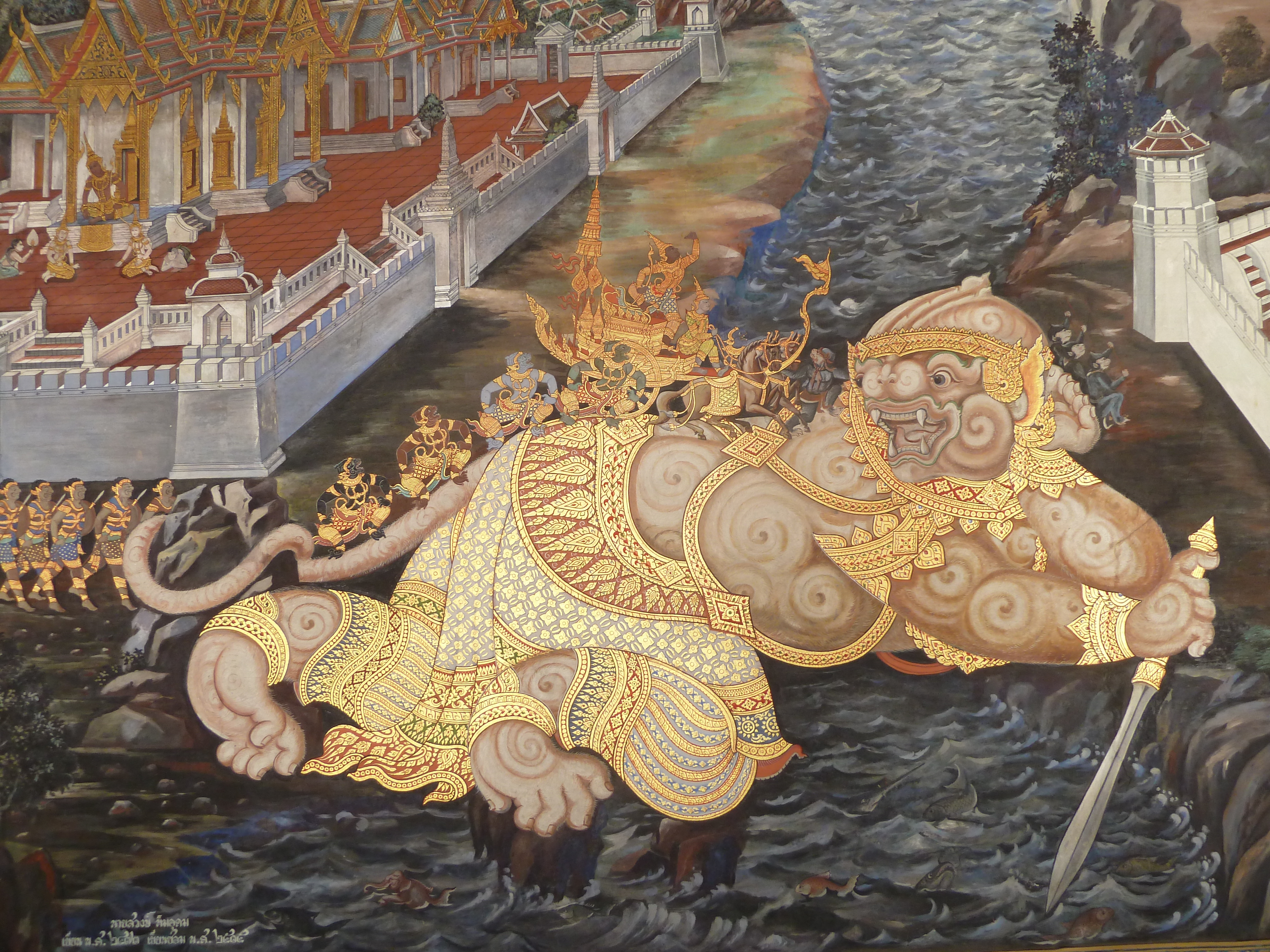

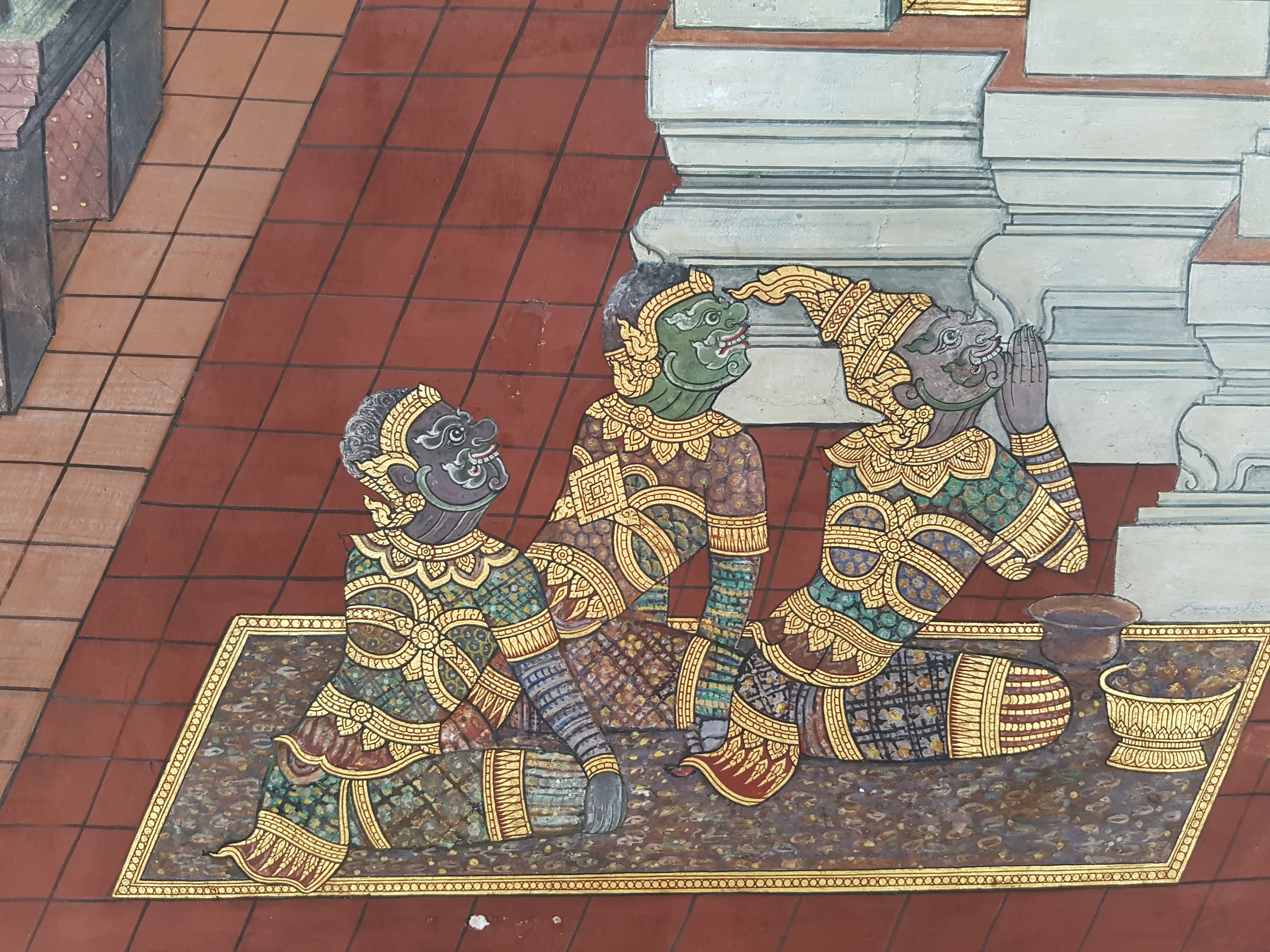

== Gates ==
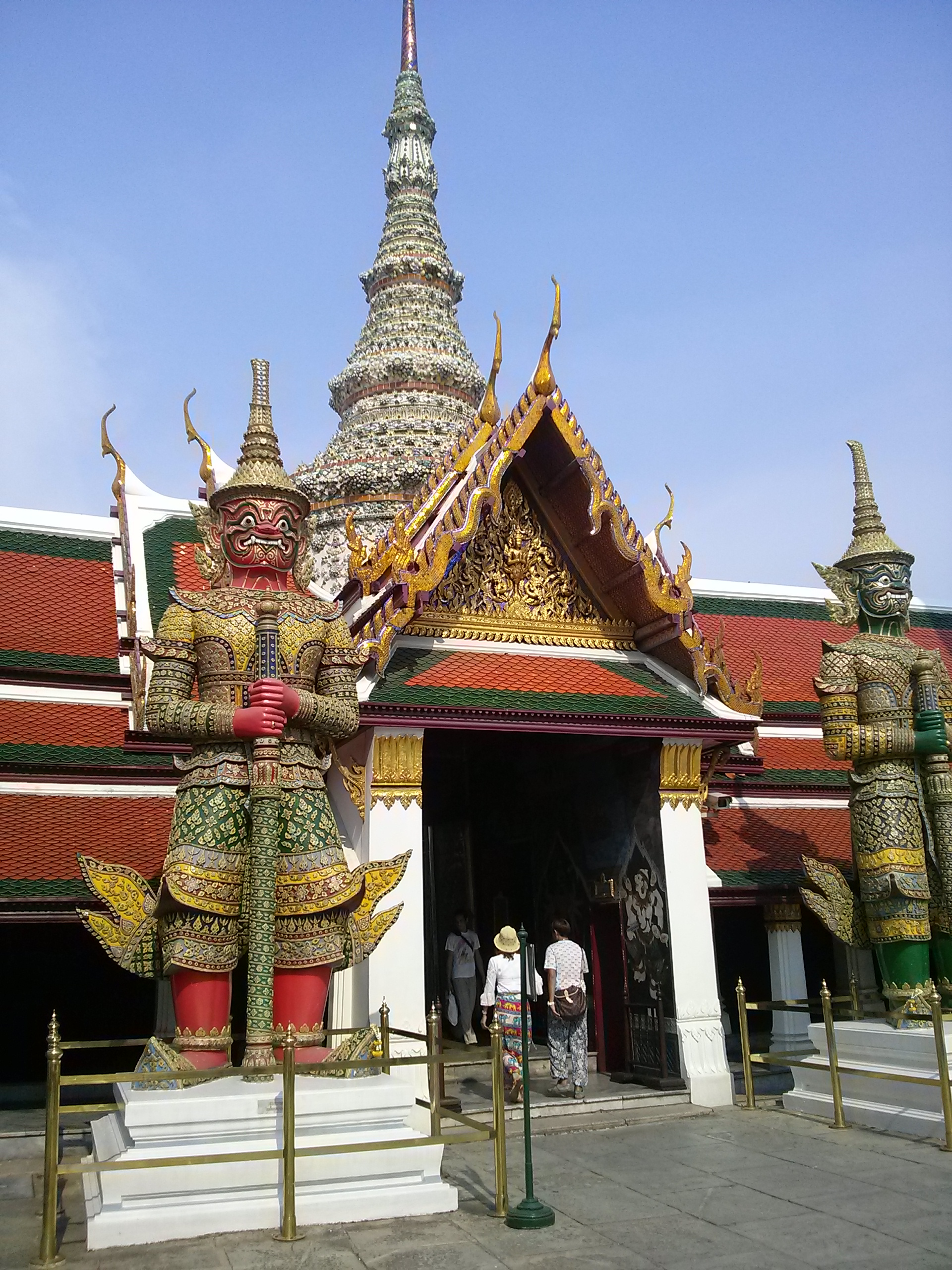
Gate No.1 or the front Koei Sadet Gate.

The temple wall has seven gates, two on the east side, one on the south, three on the west and one on the north. The first gate on the east is Gate No.1, the front Koei Sadet Gate, which is directly opposite the Prasat Phra Thep Bidon. This important gate was built by Rama IV. The gate is the only one topped with a crown-shaped spire. Outside the gate, there is a small resting pavilion and an elephant mounting platform. Gate No. 2, the Na Wua Gate, stands opposite the entrance of the Ubosot. On the south side is Gate No. 3, the Si Rattana Satsada Gate; this gate connects the temple to the Middle court of the Grand Palace, and visitors exit the temple from this gate. On the west side there are three gates, the southernmost being Gate No. 4, the Hermit Gate, named after the hermit statue directly opposite. This gate is the main entrance for visitors into the temple. Gate No. 5 is the rear Koei Sadet Gate, which is the middle gate on the western side, on the outside there is also a resting pavilion and an elephant mounting platform. This gate is usually shut as it is the gate the king uses when he enters the temple to perform ceremonies. Gate No. 6, the Sanam Chai Gate, is named for the small field outside the gate in the outer court of the Grand Palace. On the northern side is Gate No. 7, the Wihan Yot Gate; this gate stands opposite its namesake. It is the only gate without guardian giants.

=== Guardians ===
Statues of twelve yaksha (or giants) guard six of the temple's gates along three sides of the wall (all sides except the north). The giants are characters from the Ramakien epic, each distinguished by their skin colour and crowns. Each giant is about 5 metres (16 ft) tall, all clenching a mace or gada in front of them. Starting with the left giant in front of Gate No.1, the front Koei Sadet Gate, and going clockwise around the temple wall, Suriyaphop is red with a bamboo shoot crown, Intarachit is green with a similar crown, Mangkonkan is green with a Naga crown, Wirunhok is dark blue with a similar crown, Thotsakhirithon is dark red with an elephant's trunk instead of a nose and a bamboo shoot crown, Thotsakhiriwan is green with a similar nose and crown, Chakkrawat is white with a smaller head on the top of his crown of feathers, Atsakanmala is purple with a similar extra head but a normal crown, Thotsakan is green with two tiers of smaller heads on top of his crown, Sahatsadecha is white with multiple heads, Maiyarap is light purple with a cockerel's tail crown and Wirunchambang is dark blue with a similar crown.

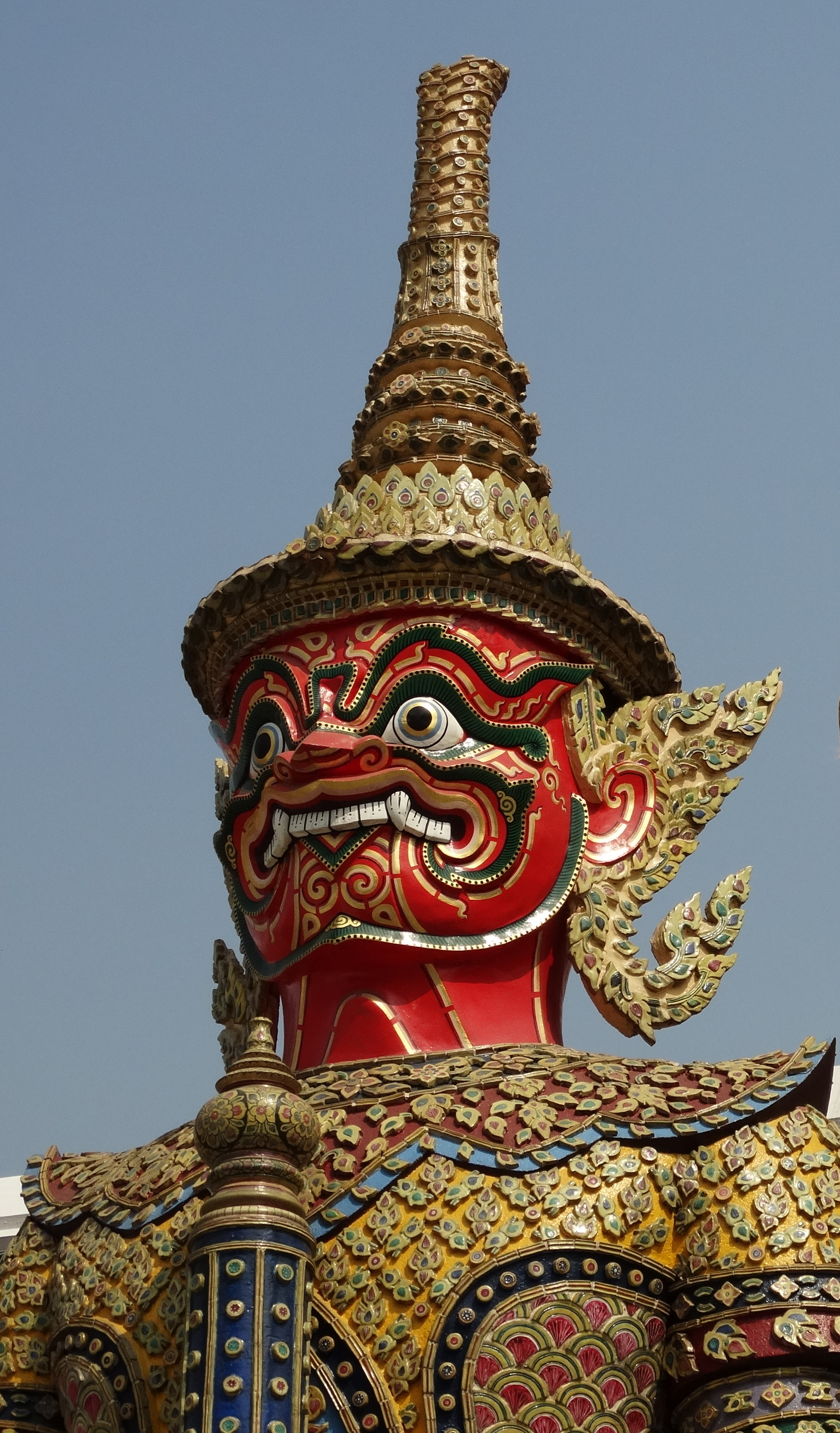
Suriyaphop
(สุริยาภพ)

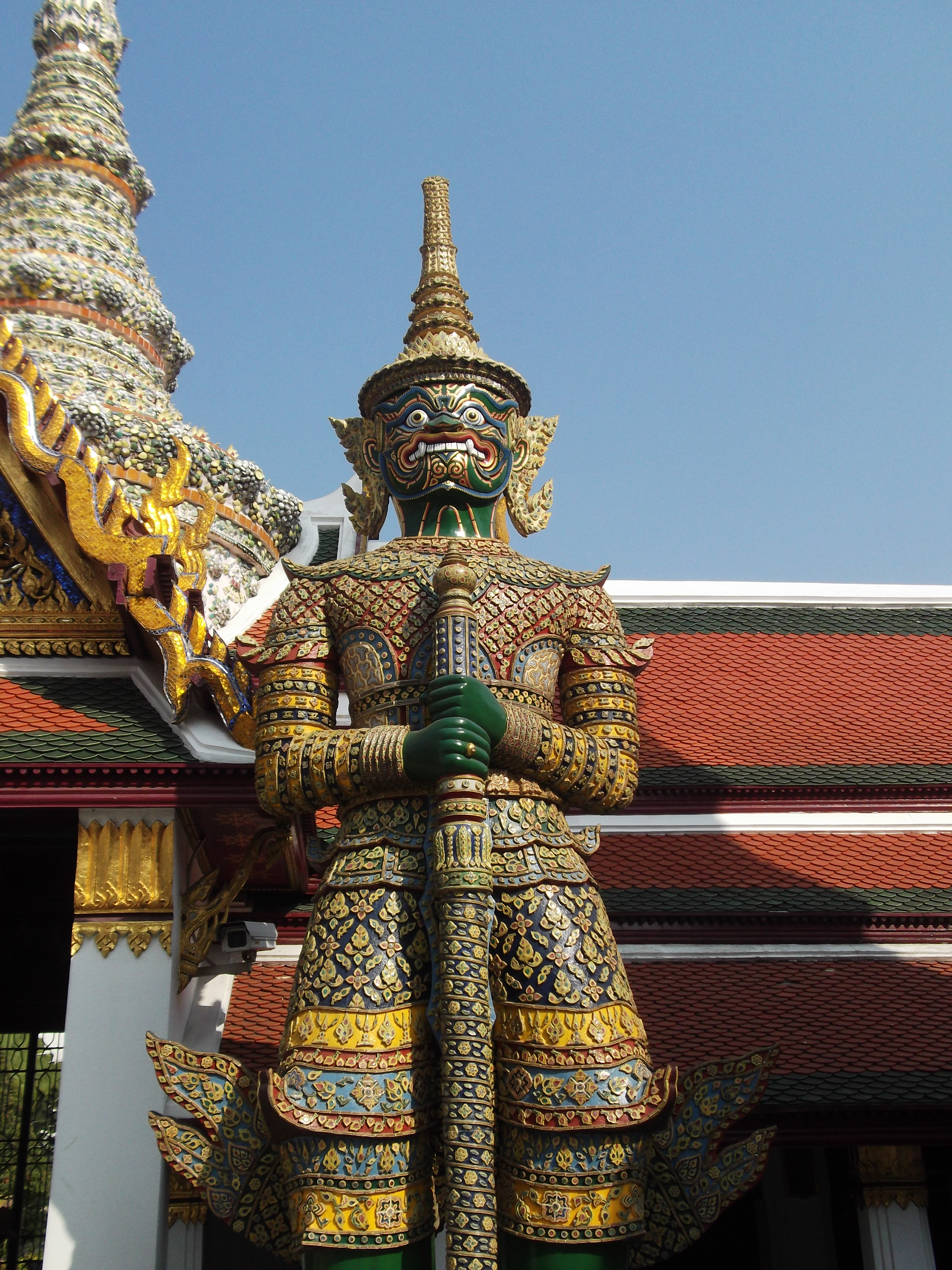
Intarachit
(อินทรชิต)

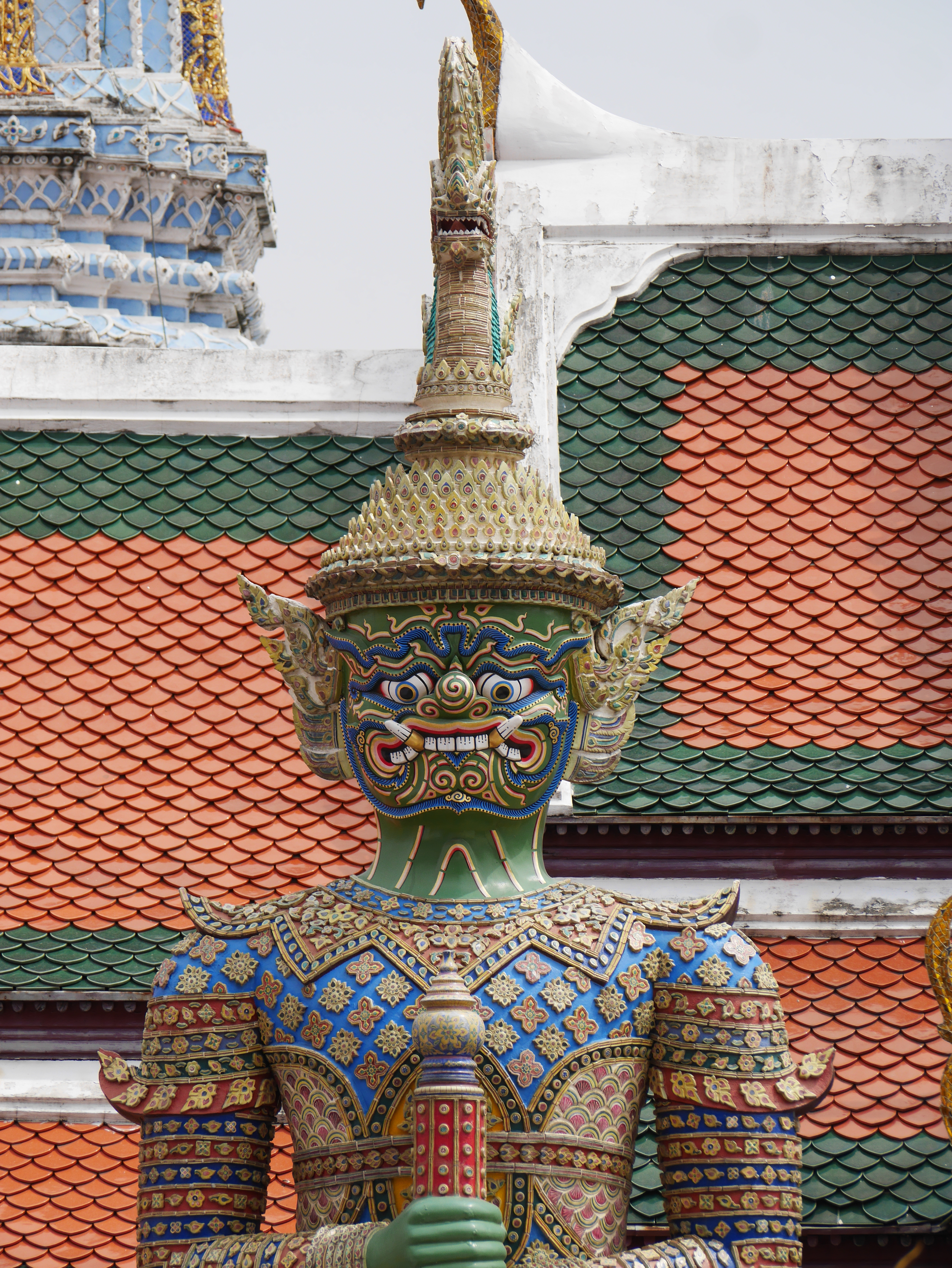
Mangkonkan
(มังกรกัณฐ์)

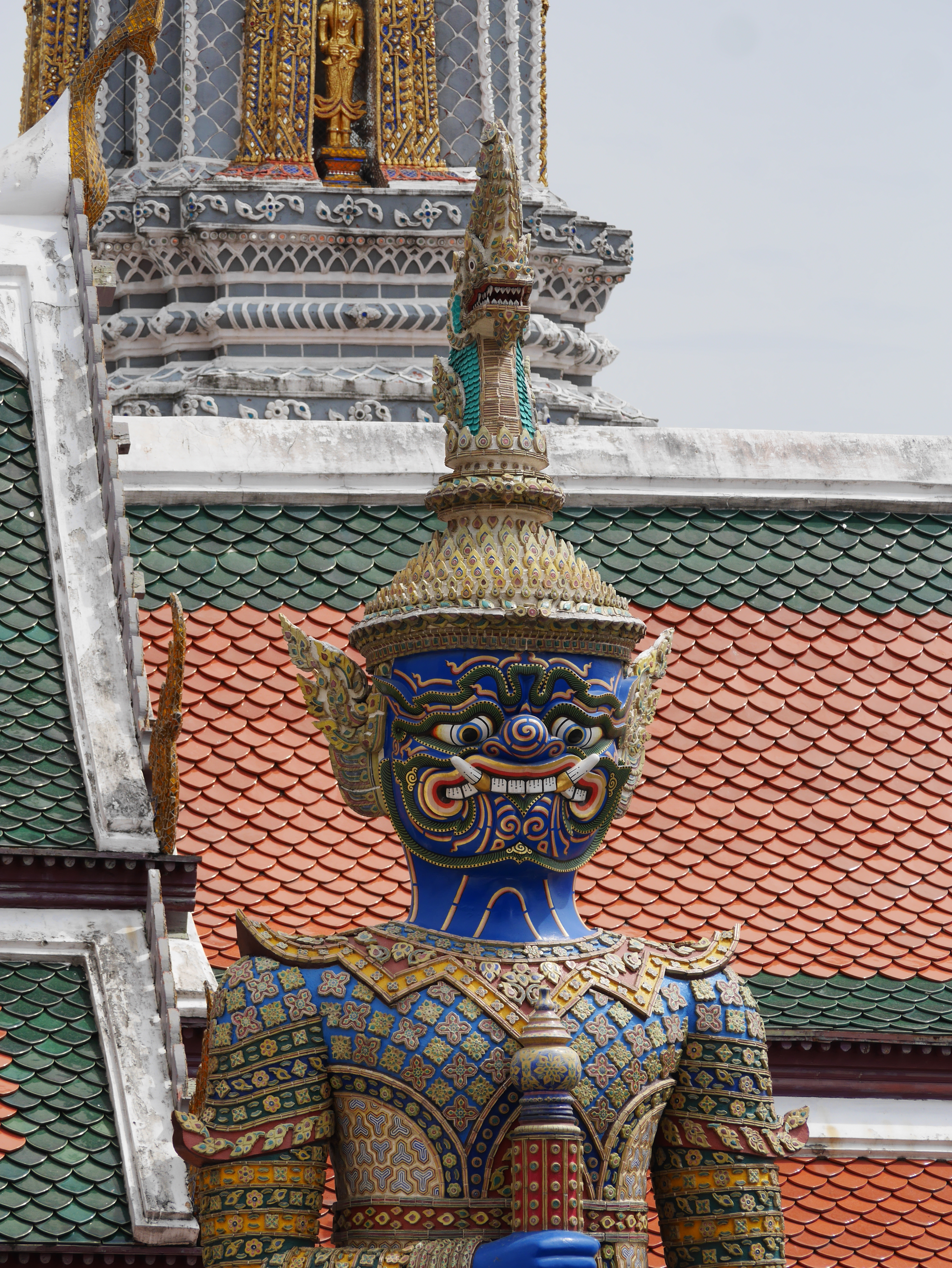
Wirunhok
(วิรุฬหก)

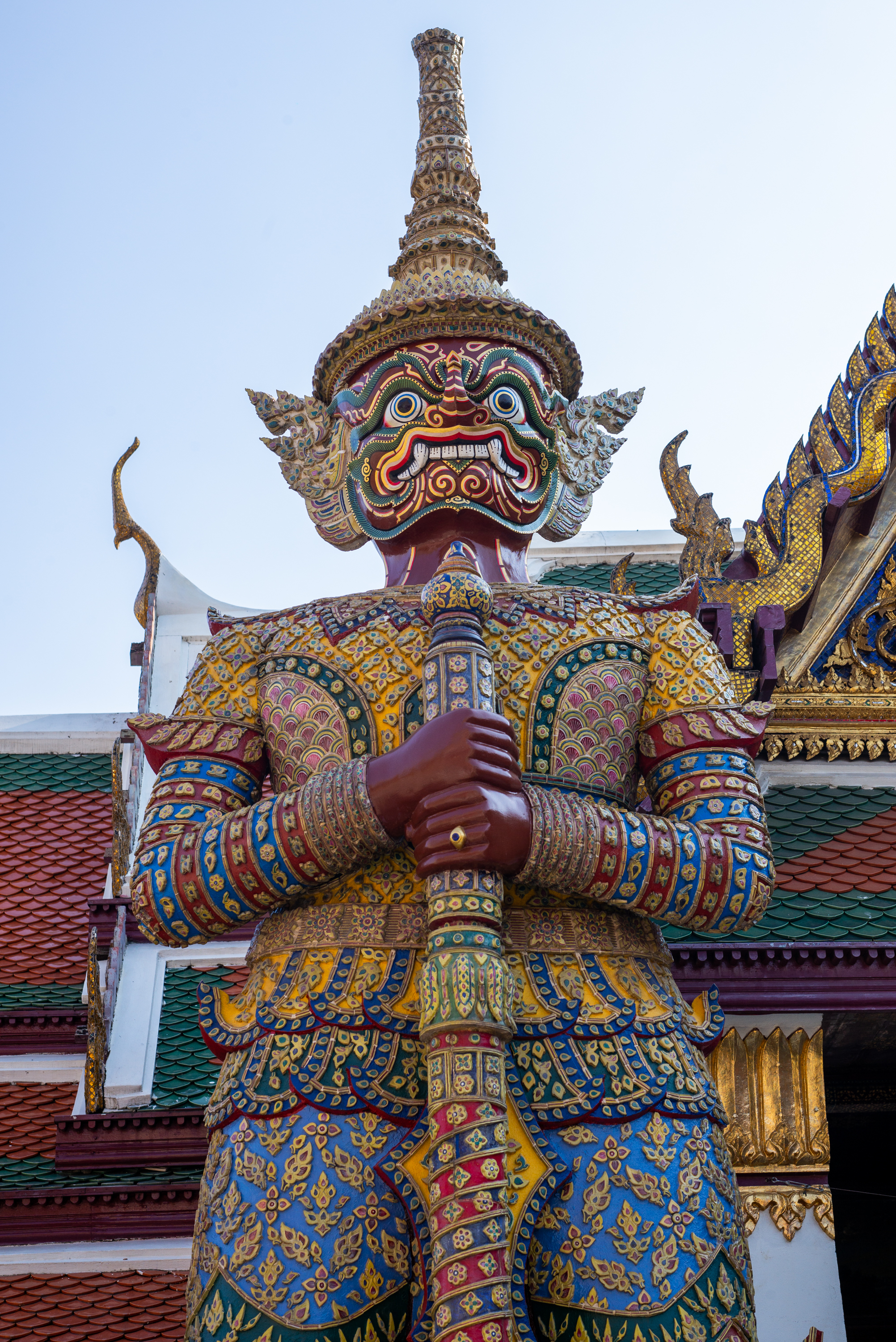
Thotsakhirithon
(ทศคีรีธร)

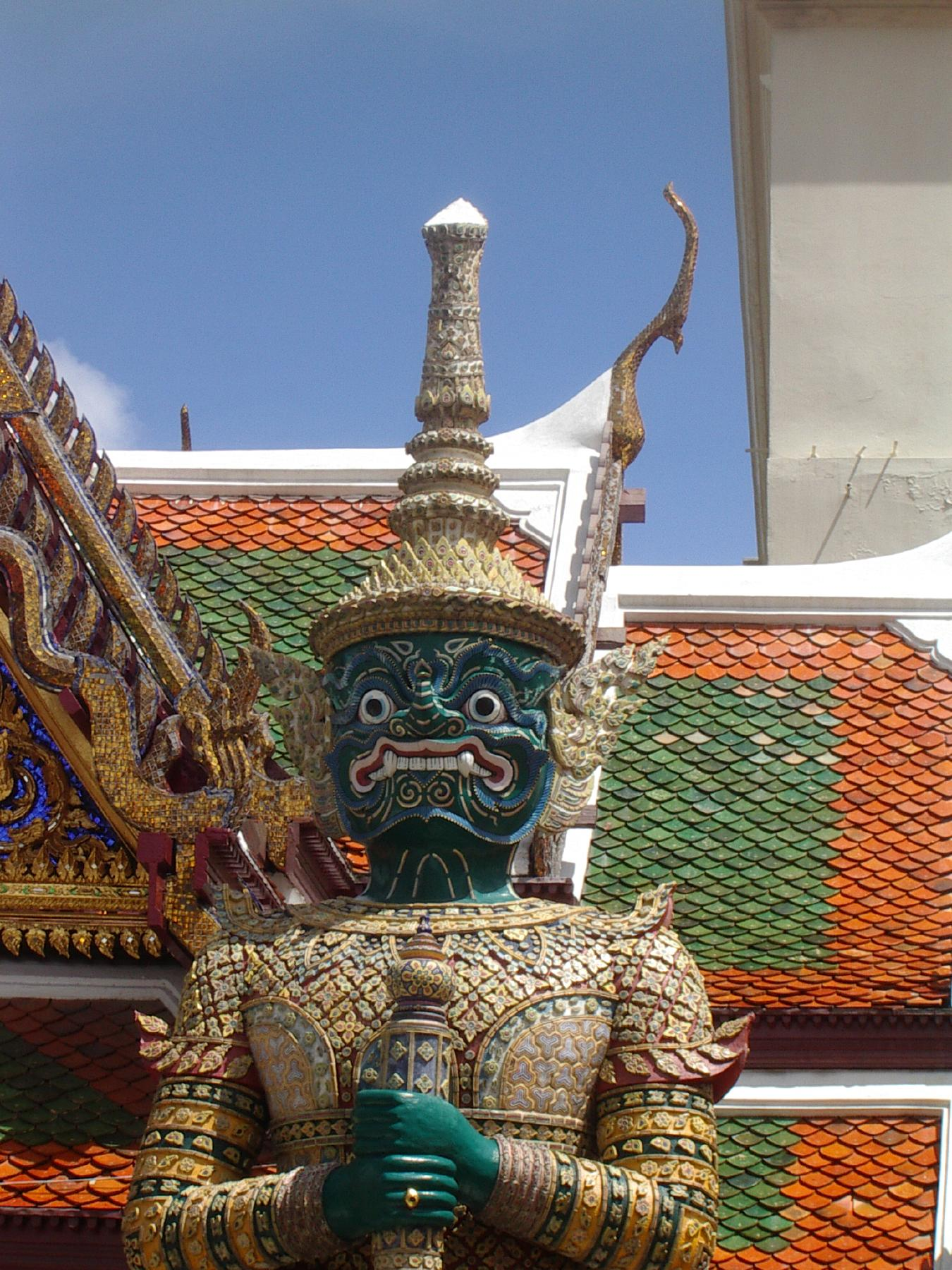
Thotsakhiriwan
(ทศคีรีวัน)
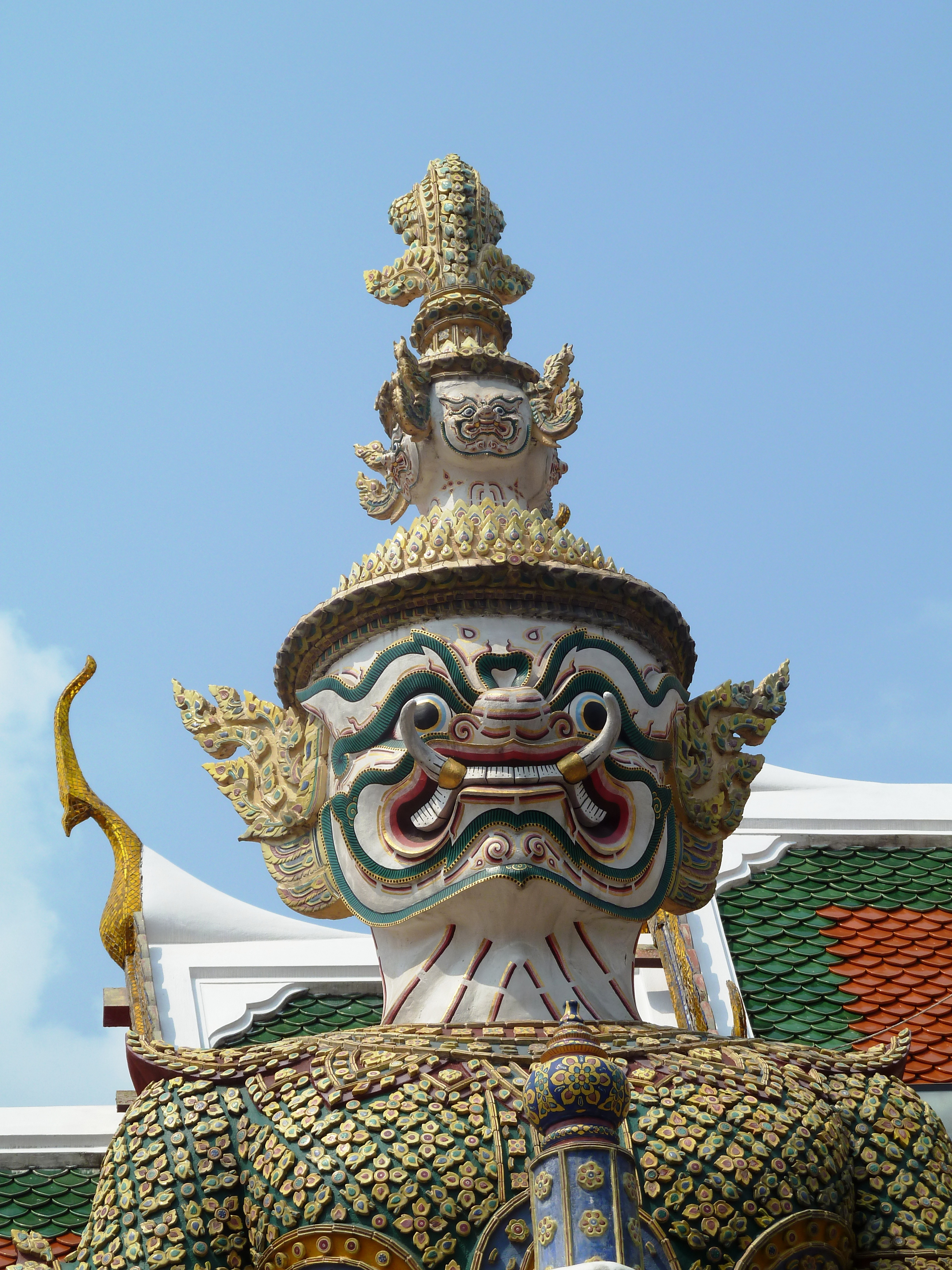
Chakkrawat
(จักรวรรดิ)

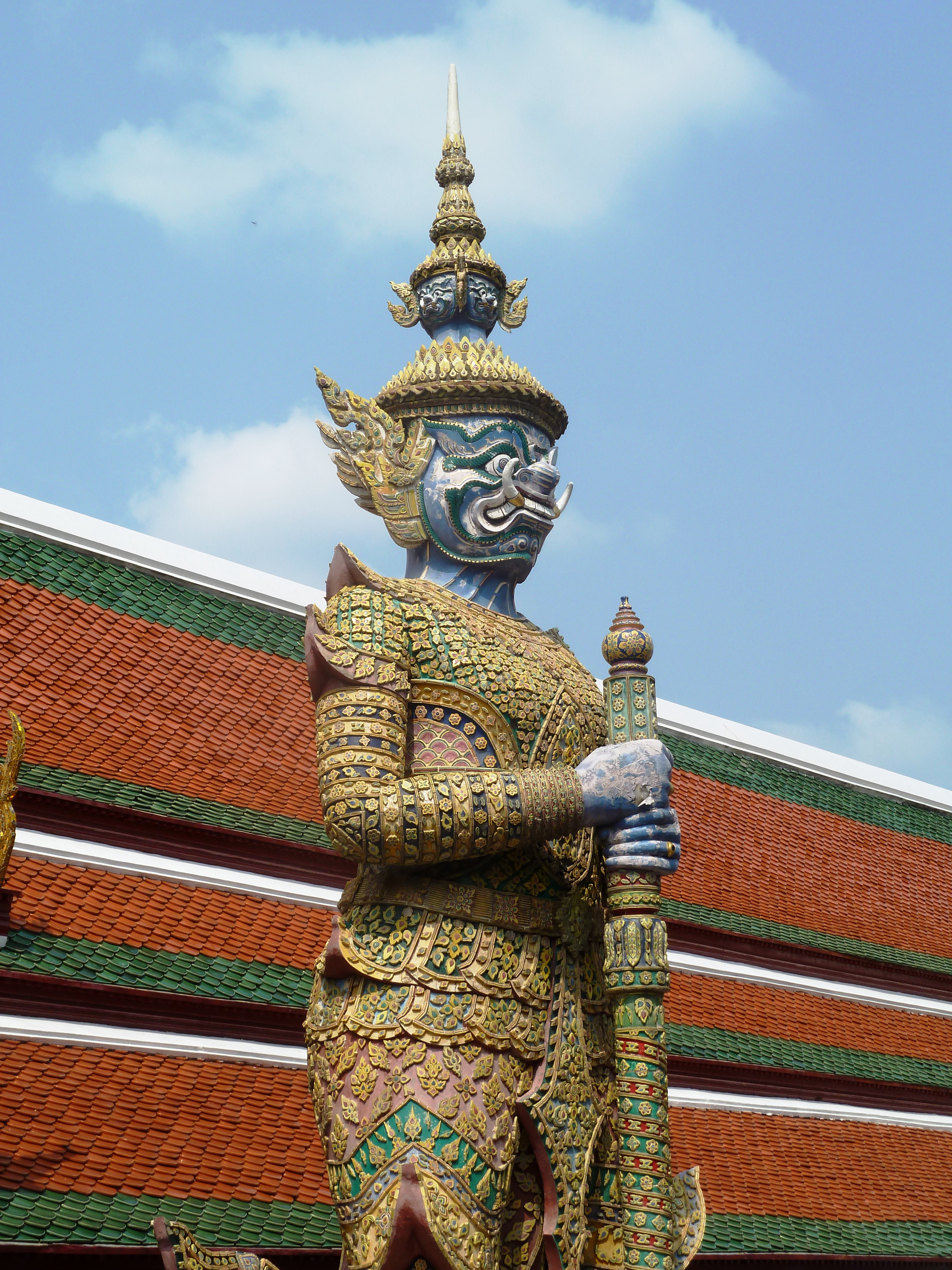
Atsakanmara
(อัศกรรณมาราสูร)

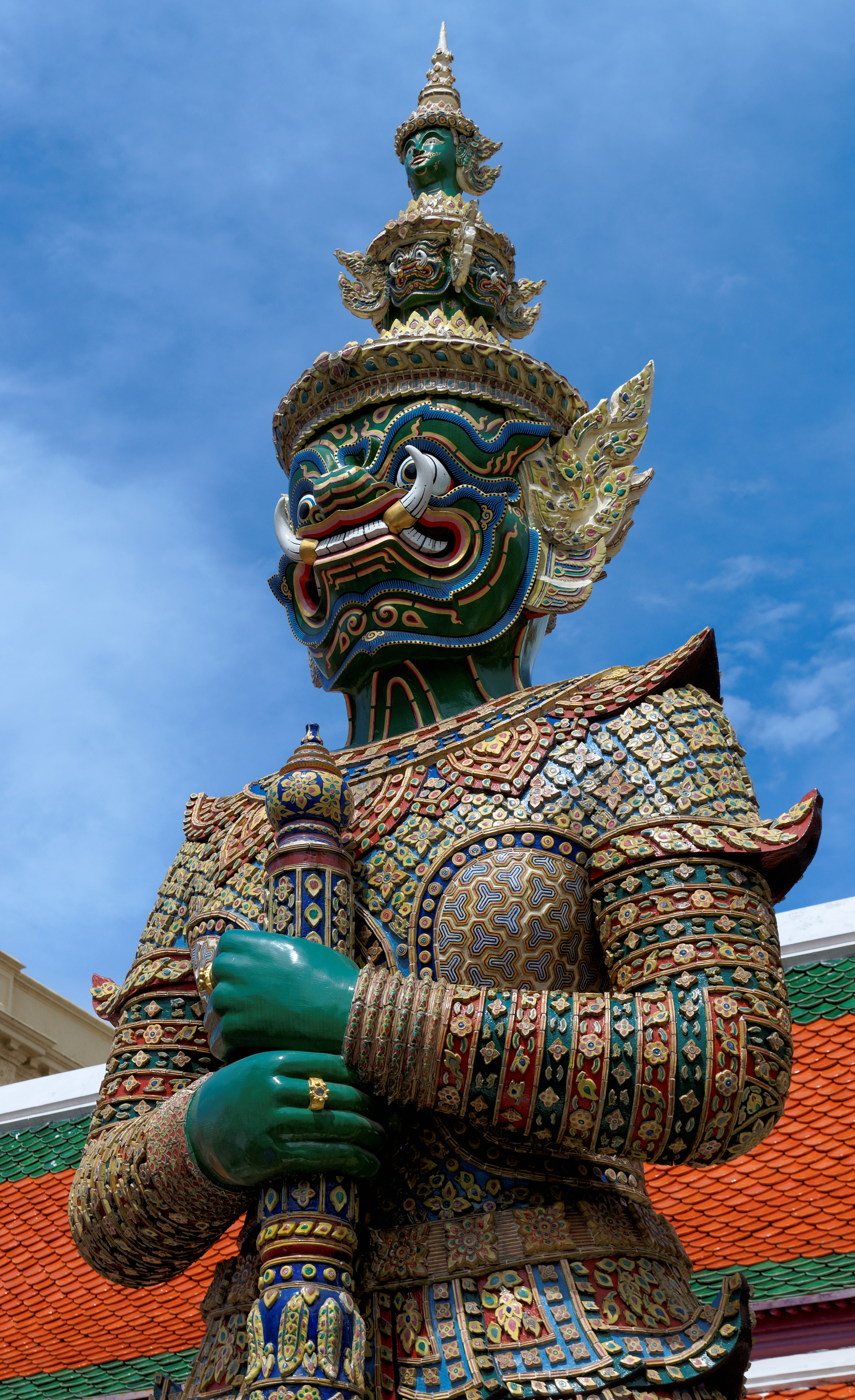
Thotsakan
(ทศกัณฐ์)

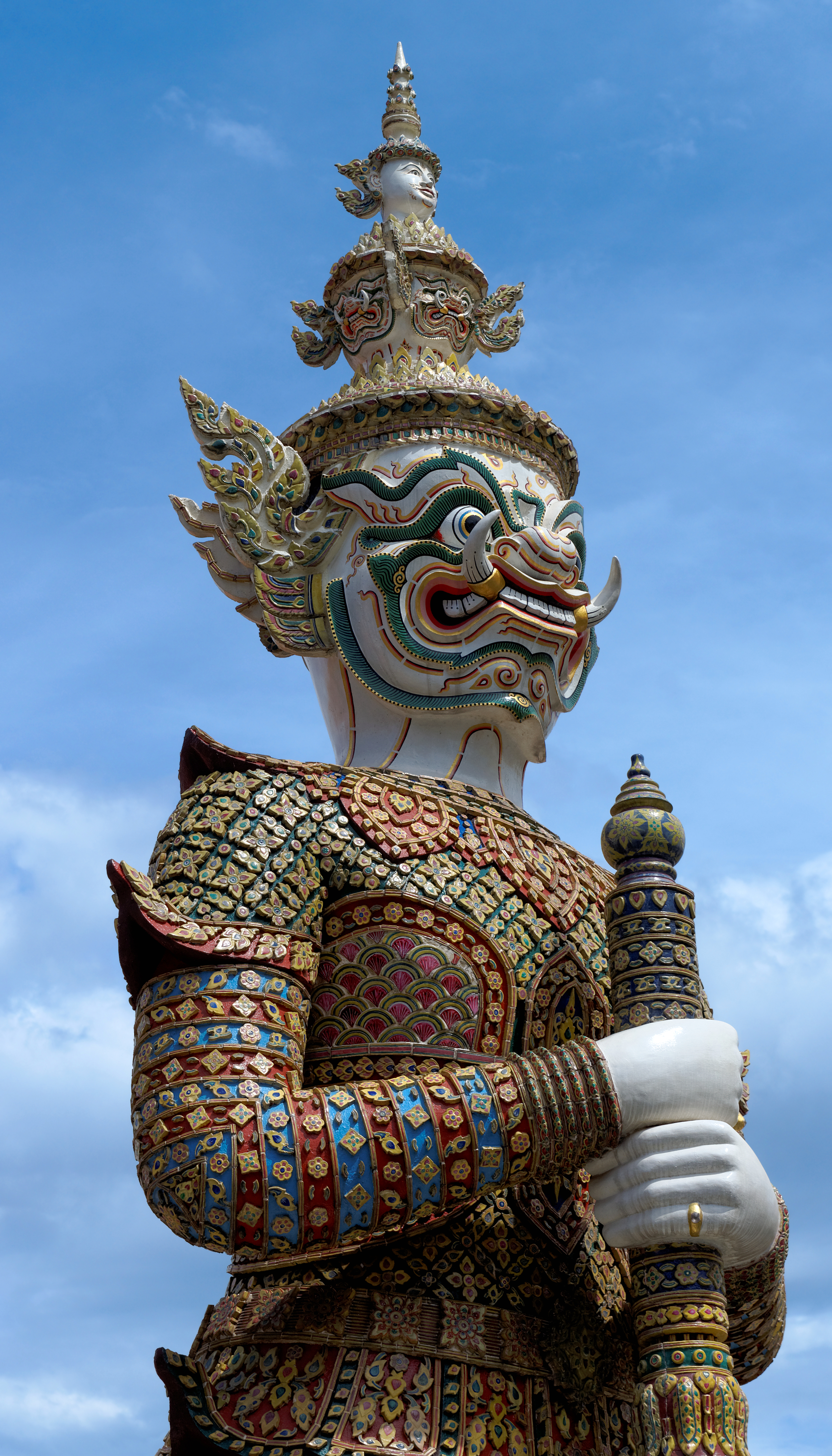
Sahatsadecha
(สหัสเดชะ)

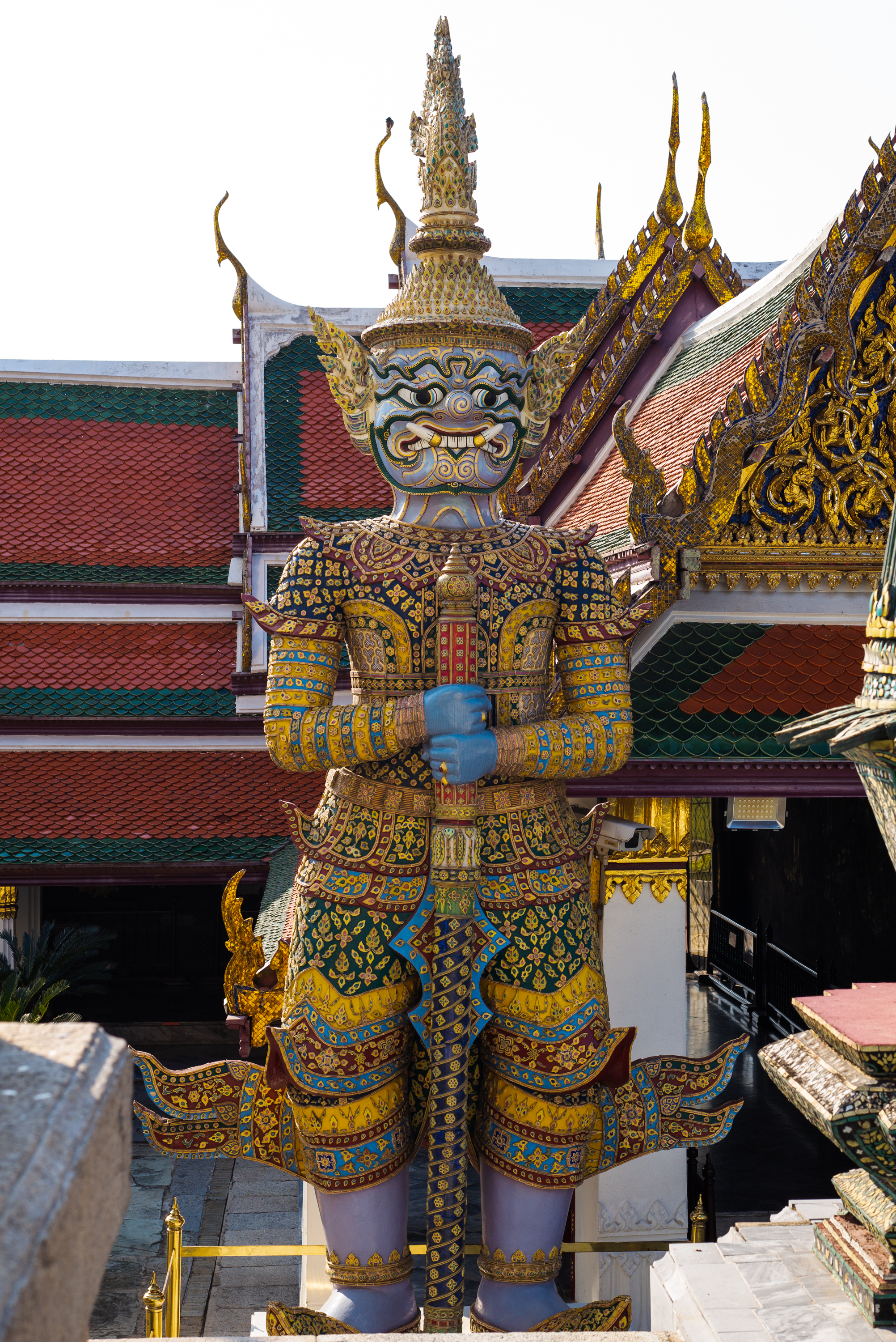
Maiyarap
(ไมยราพ)

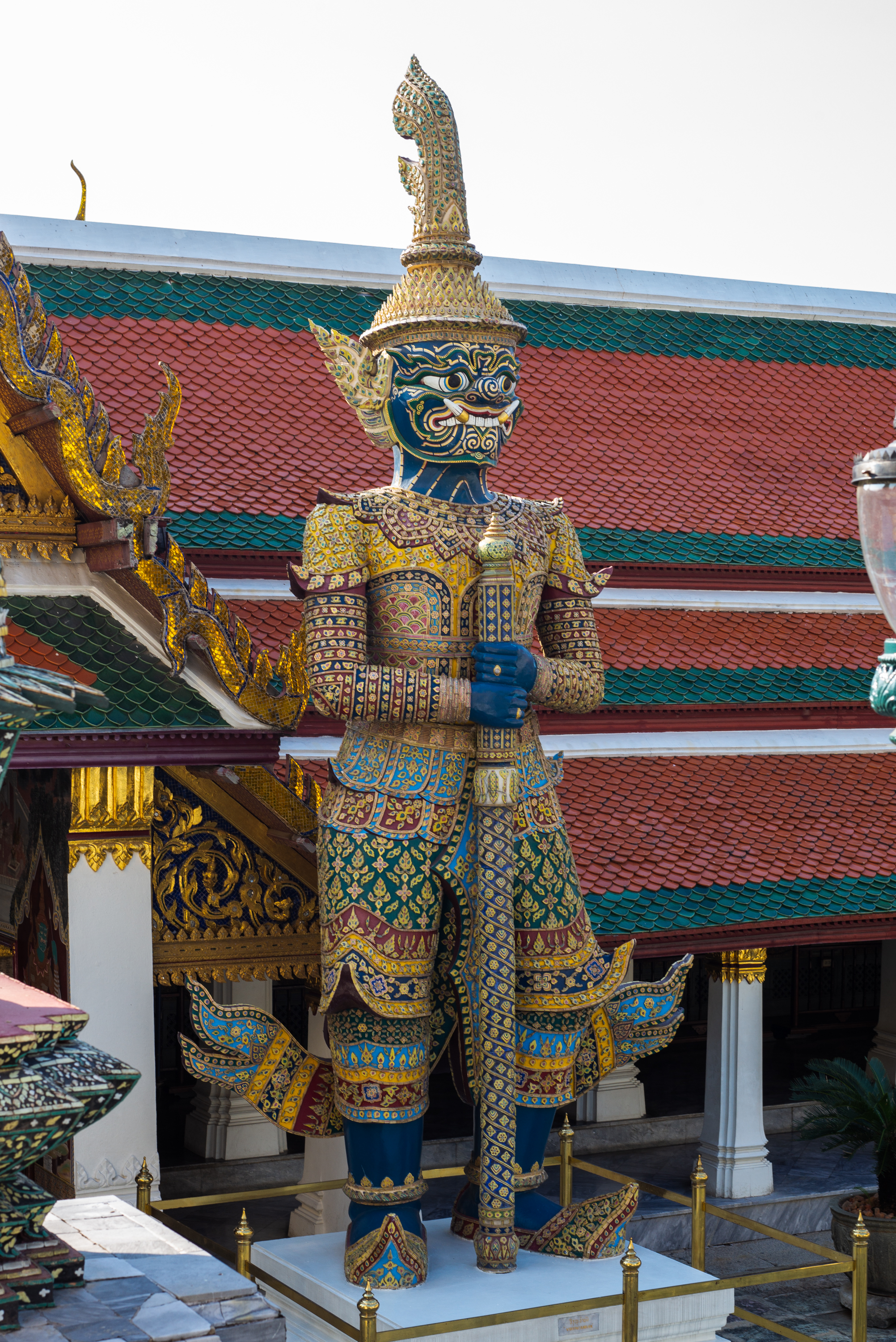
Wirunchambang
(วิรุณจำบัง)

== See also ==
- Buddhist kingship
- Wat Pho (Temple of the Reclining Buddha)
