= Busabok =

Structure in Thai culture

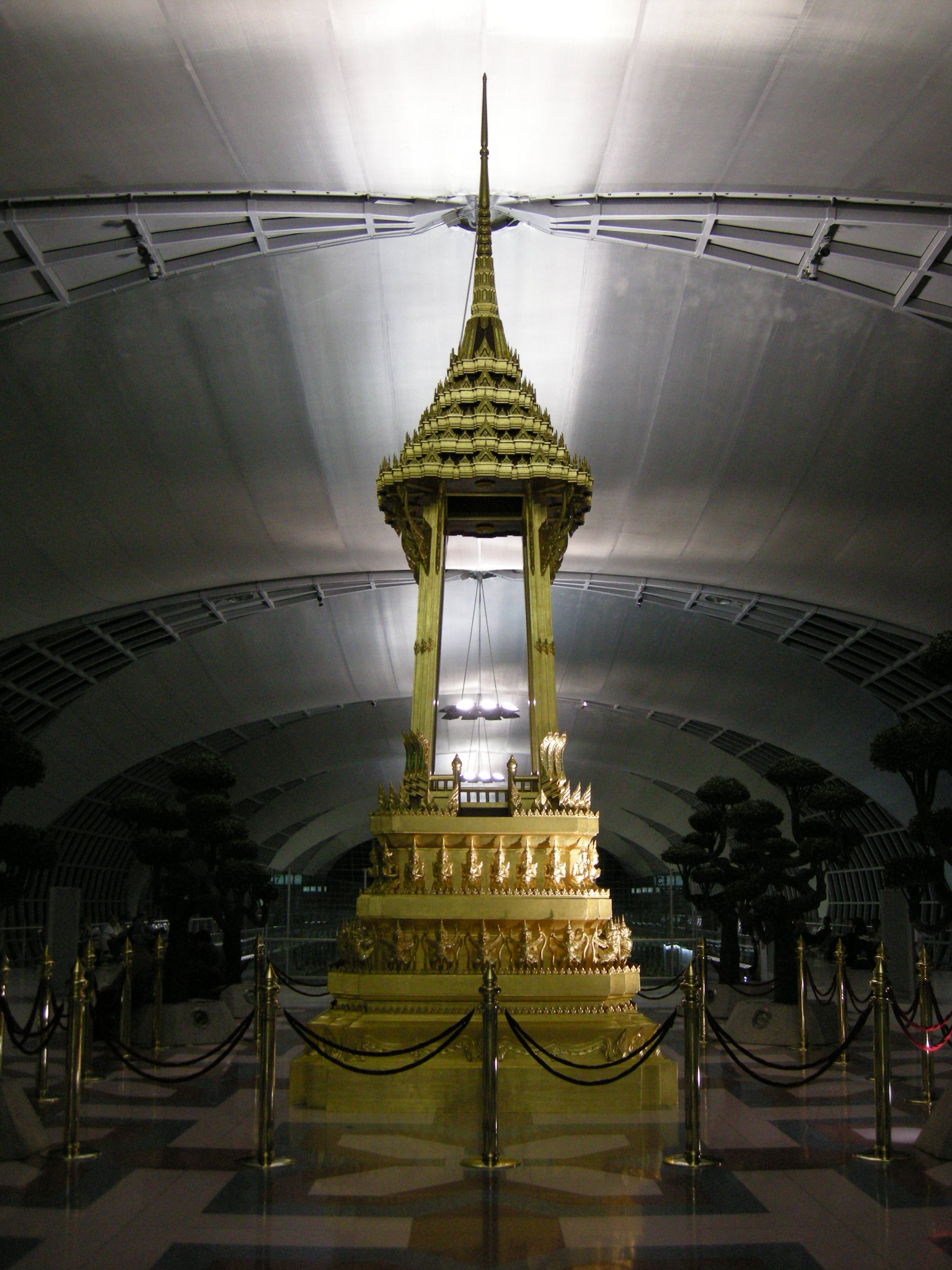
Busabok sculpture at Suvarnabhumi Airport

A busabok (Thai: บุษบก, RTGS: butsabok) is a small open structure used in Thai culture as a throne for the monarch or for the enshrinement of Buddha images or other sacred objects. It is square-based and open-sided, usually with twelve indented corners, with four posts supporting a roughly pyramidal multi-tiered roof culminating in a pointed spire, and usually richly decorated. The structure of the multi-tiered roof is very similar, but much smaller in size, to the mondop architectural form. The term is derived from the Sanskrit word puṣpaka, a reference to the Pushpaka Vimana, a flying chariot from the Hindu epic Ramayana (and the Thai version Ramakien).

Busabok are used for royal thrones, including the Busabok Mala Throne in the Amarin Winitchai Throne Hall of the Grand Palace, as well as the thrones used ceremonially in royal barge processions. Smaller busabok are used to house objects associated with the king—an early documented example was used to carry the royal letter of King Narai to Louis XIV in the 1686 Siamese embassy to France. Busabok are also used as shrines housing Buddha images, notably the Emerald Buddha in Wat Phra Kaew and Phra Phuttha Sihing at the Front Palace. Very large versions have formed the design of the temporary crematoria used for royal funerals of previous kings. The busabok was also the basis for a style of Buddhist pulpit known as thammat yot or busabok thammat.

== Gallery ==
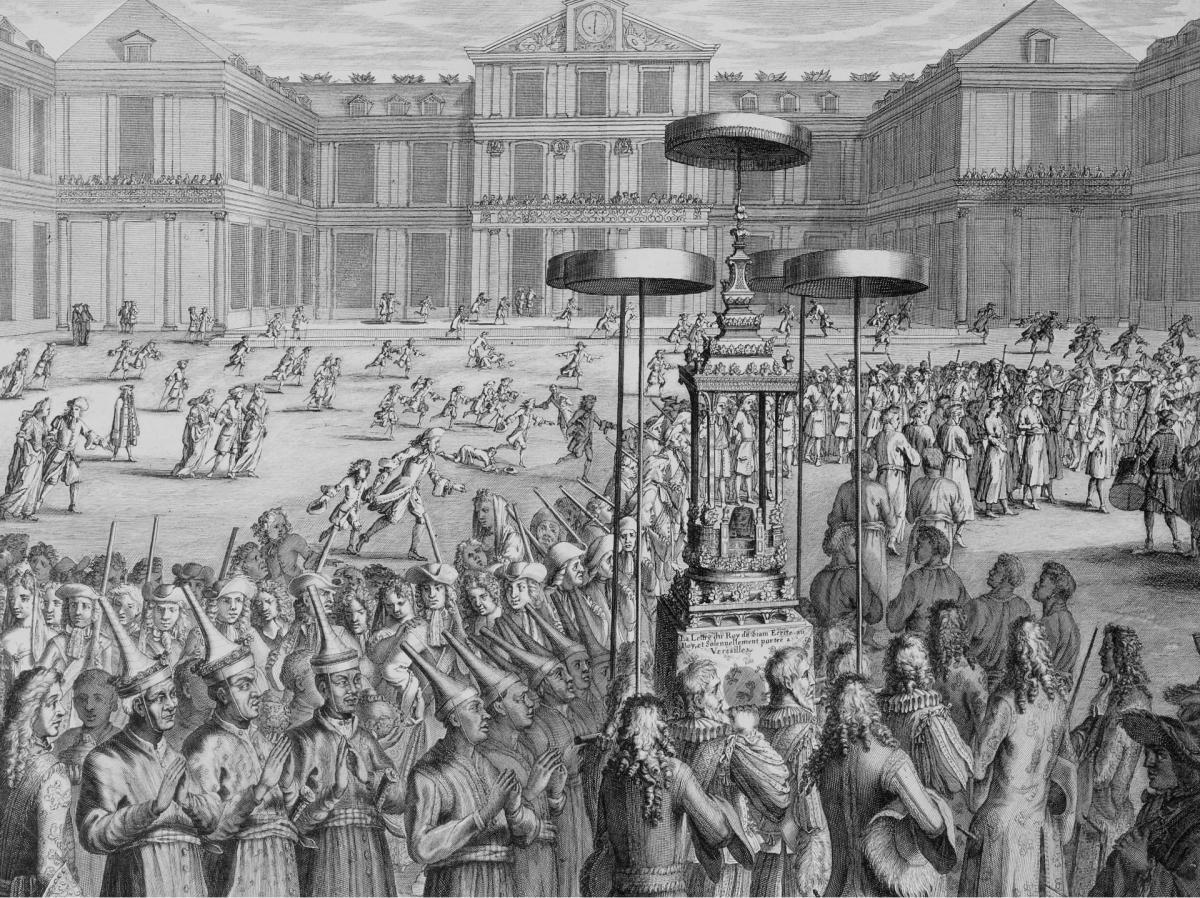
An engraving from the French Almanach pour 1687 (1687), by an unknown artist, showing the ceremonial transport of a royal letter from King Narai to King Louis XIV. The missive (engraved on gold leaf) is carried in a portable busabok throne. The Siamese embassy led by Kosa Pan reached Paris on 1 September 1686.

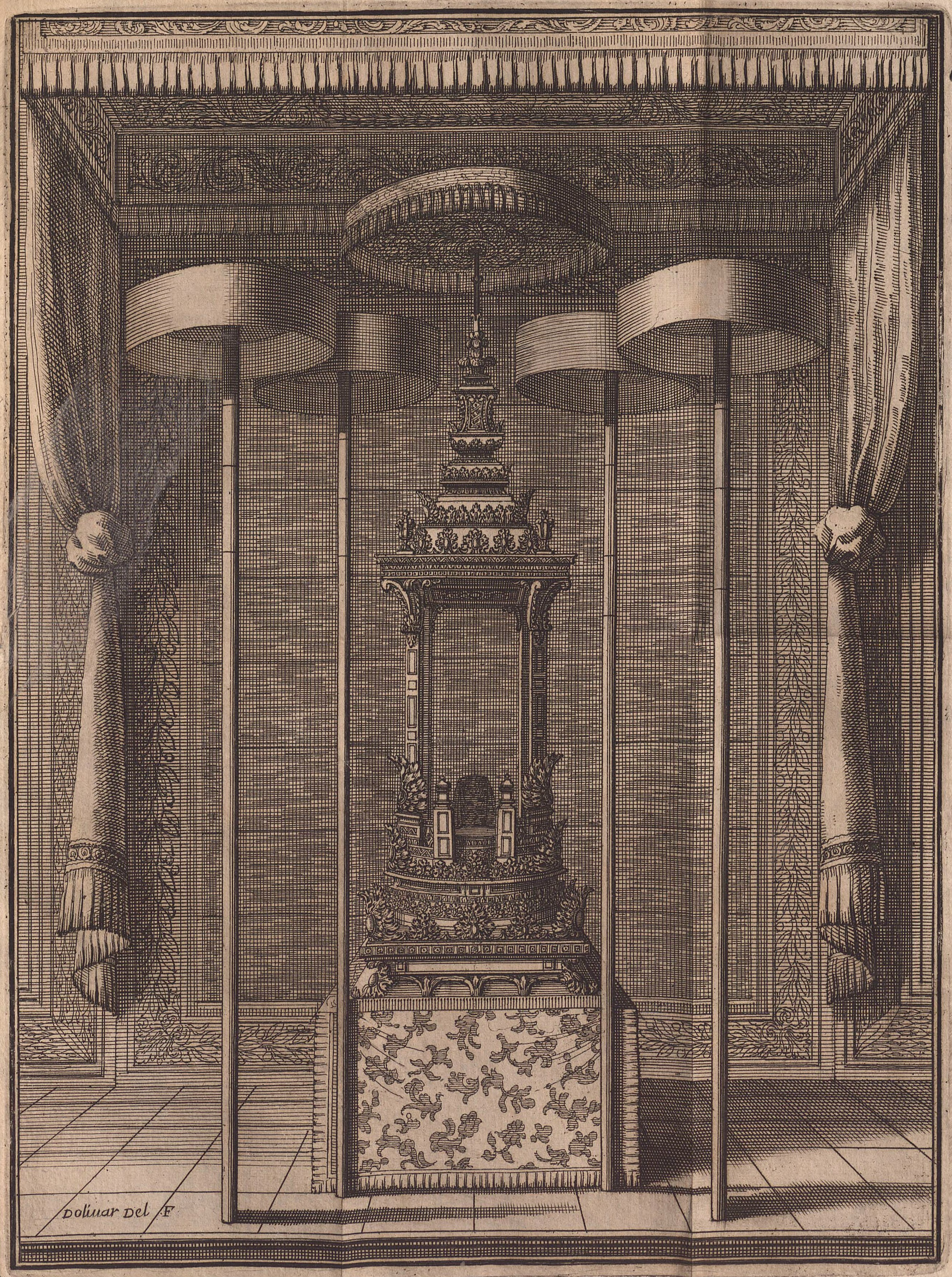
Busabok a portable throne, with a letter from King Narai to King Louis XIV, brought to the Palace of Versailles by Siamese envoys in 1686. The drawing was made by Jean Donneau de Vizé.

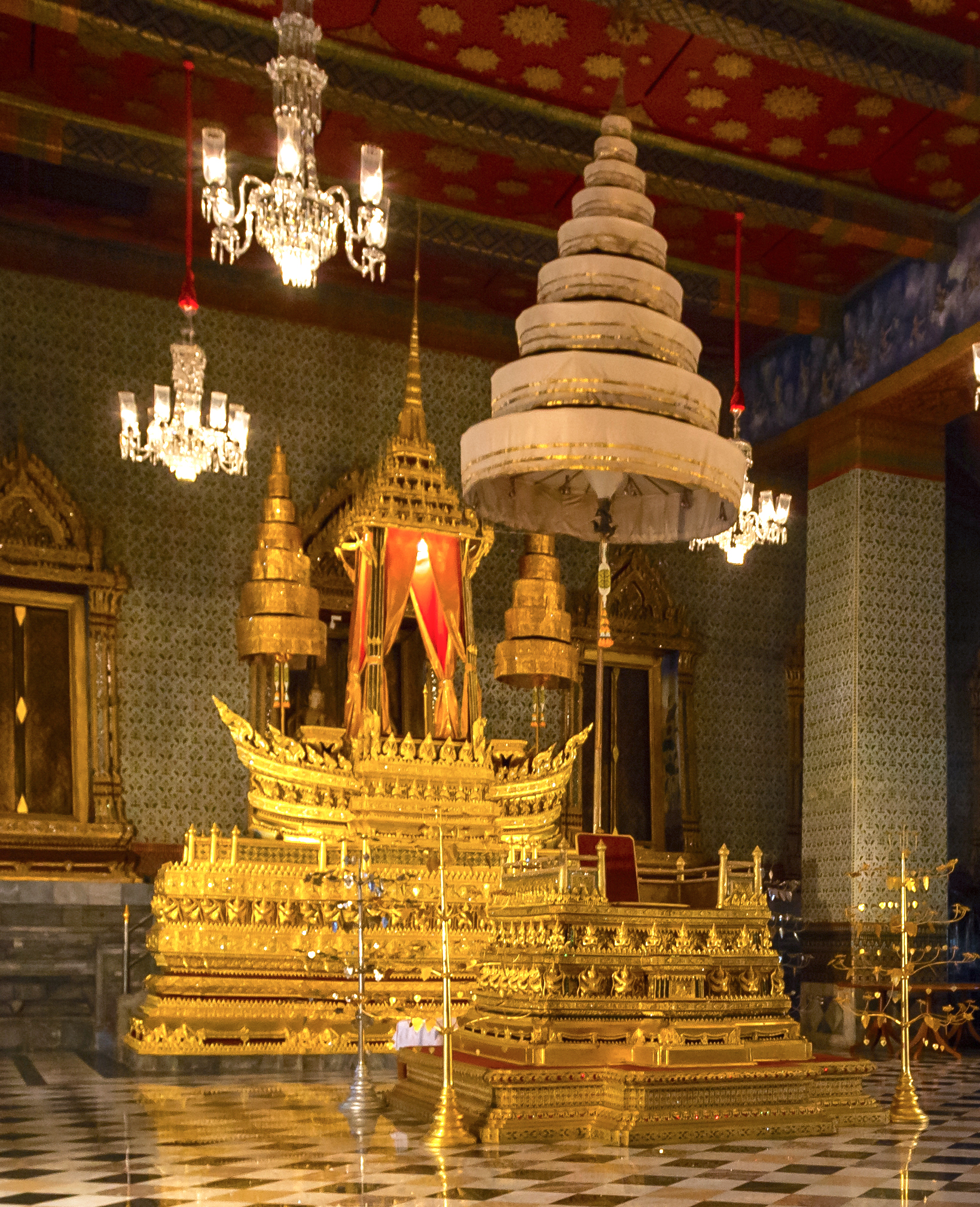
Busabok Mala Throne (rear-left)

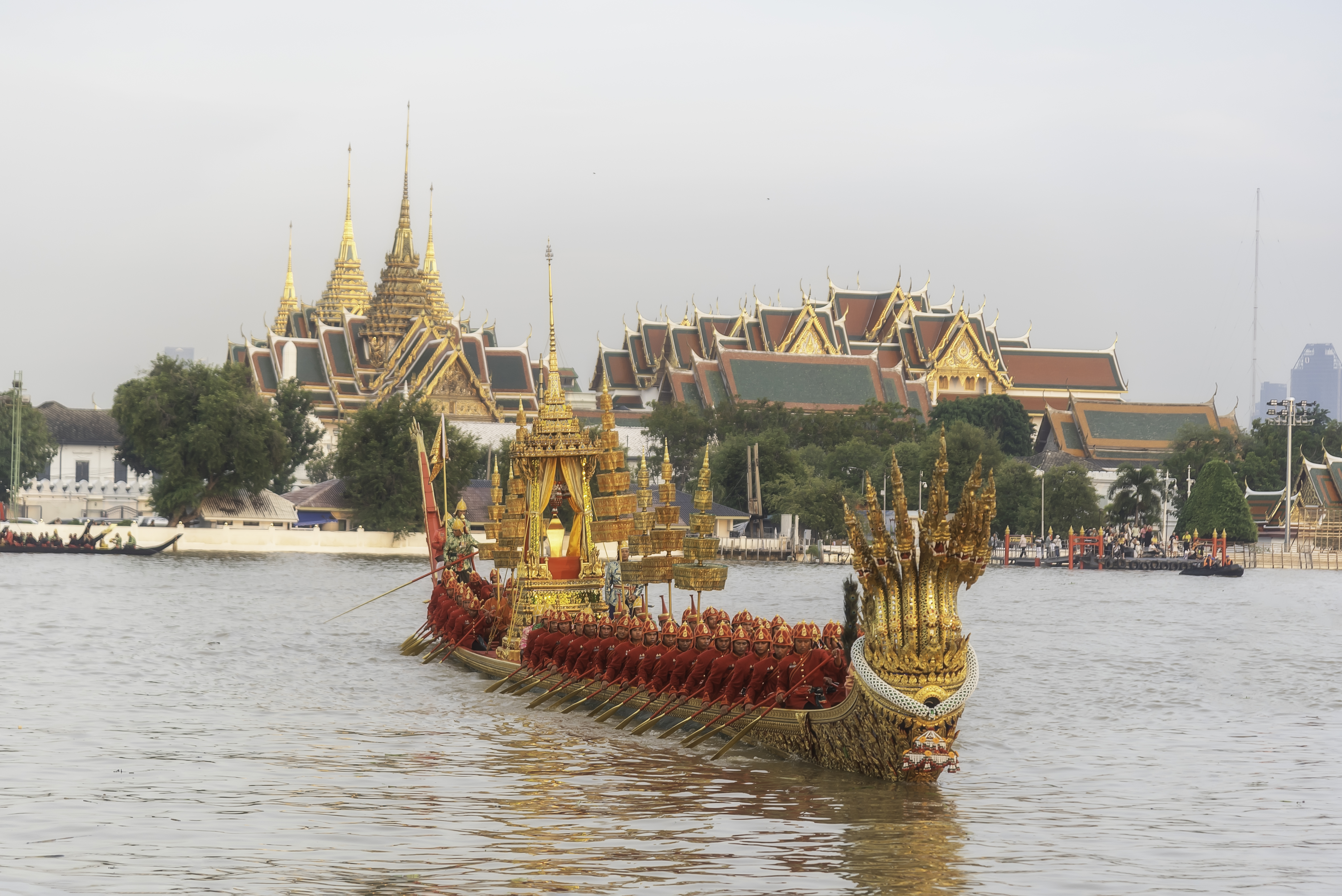
The royal barge Anantanakkharat during a Royal Barge Procession

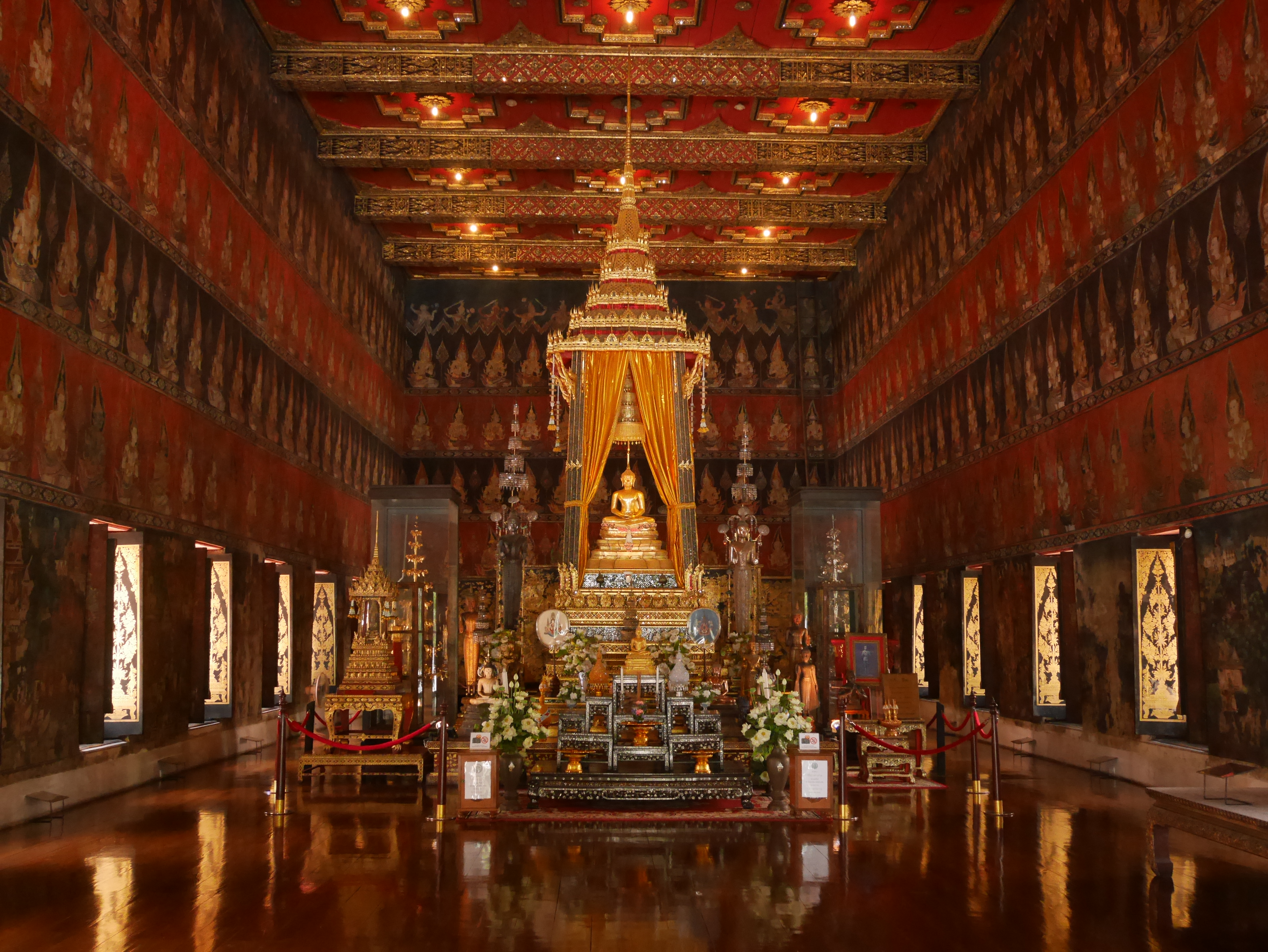
Phra Phuttha Sihing

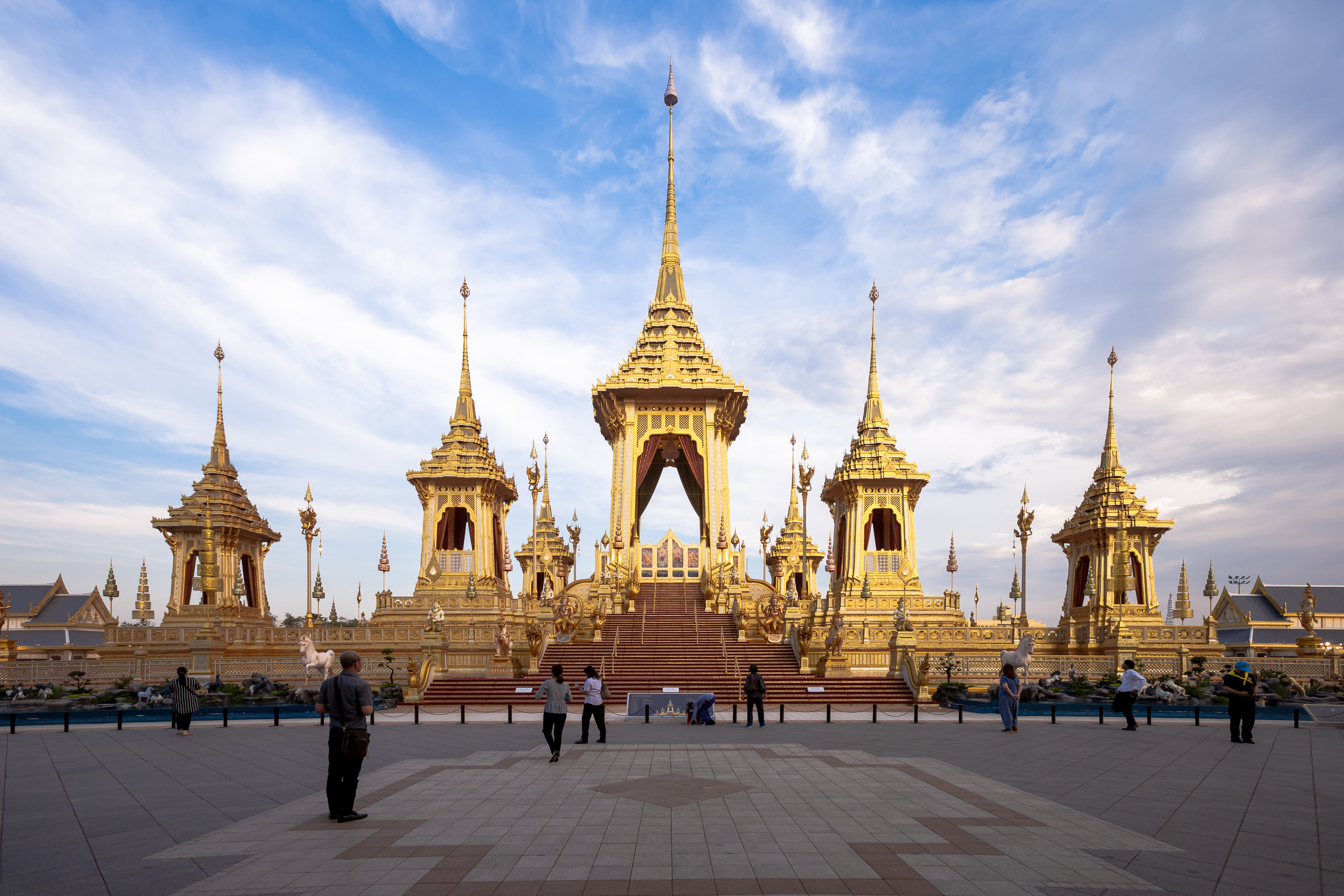
Royal crematorium of King Bhumibol Adulyadej

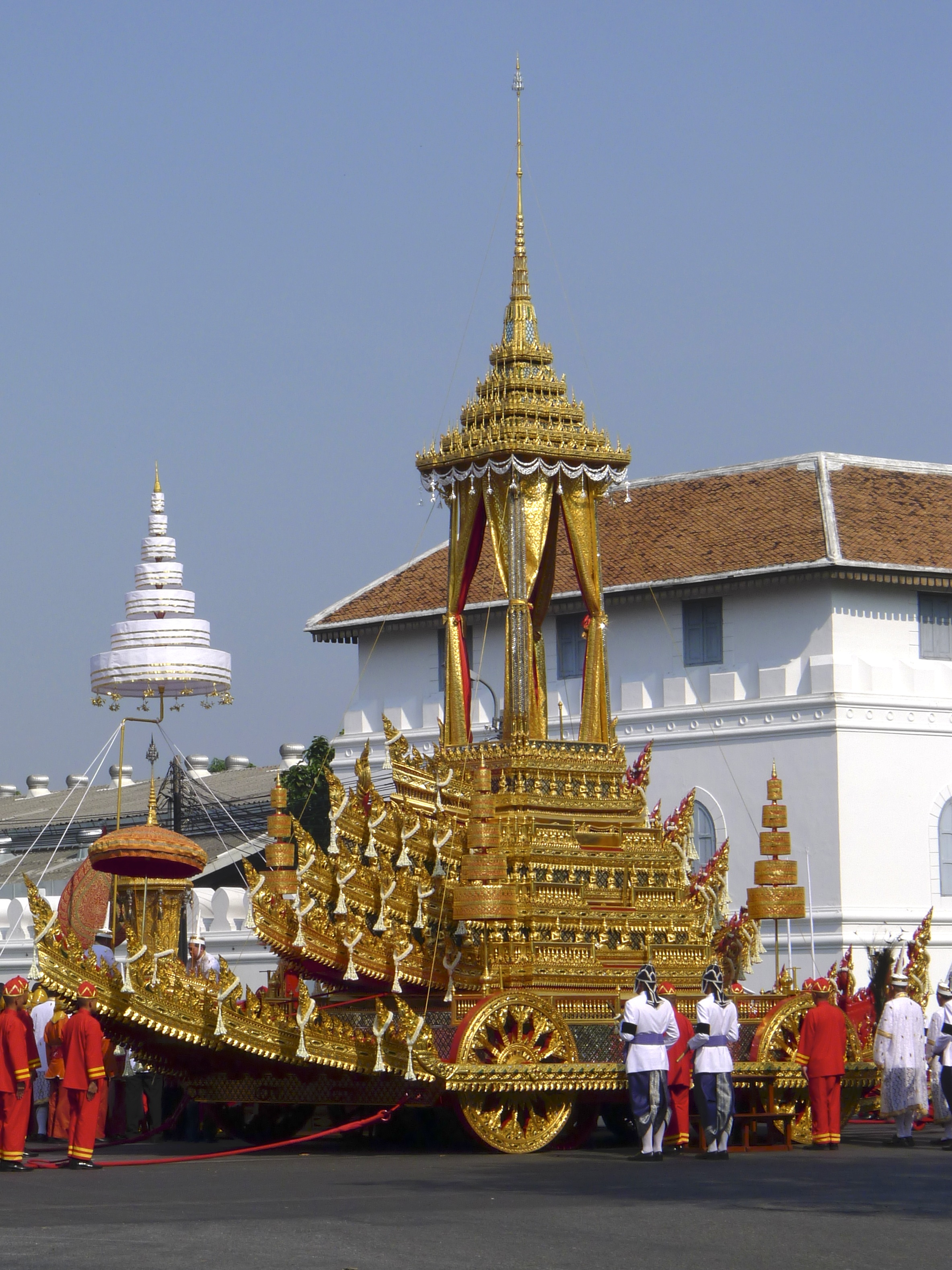
Royal funeral carriage Maha Phichai Ratcharot

== See also ==
- Palin, the Burmese throne
