= Jacques Vigouroux Duplessis =

French painter

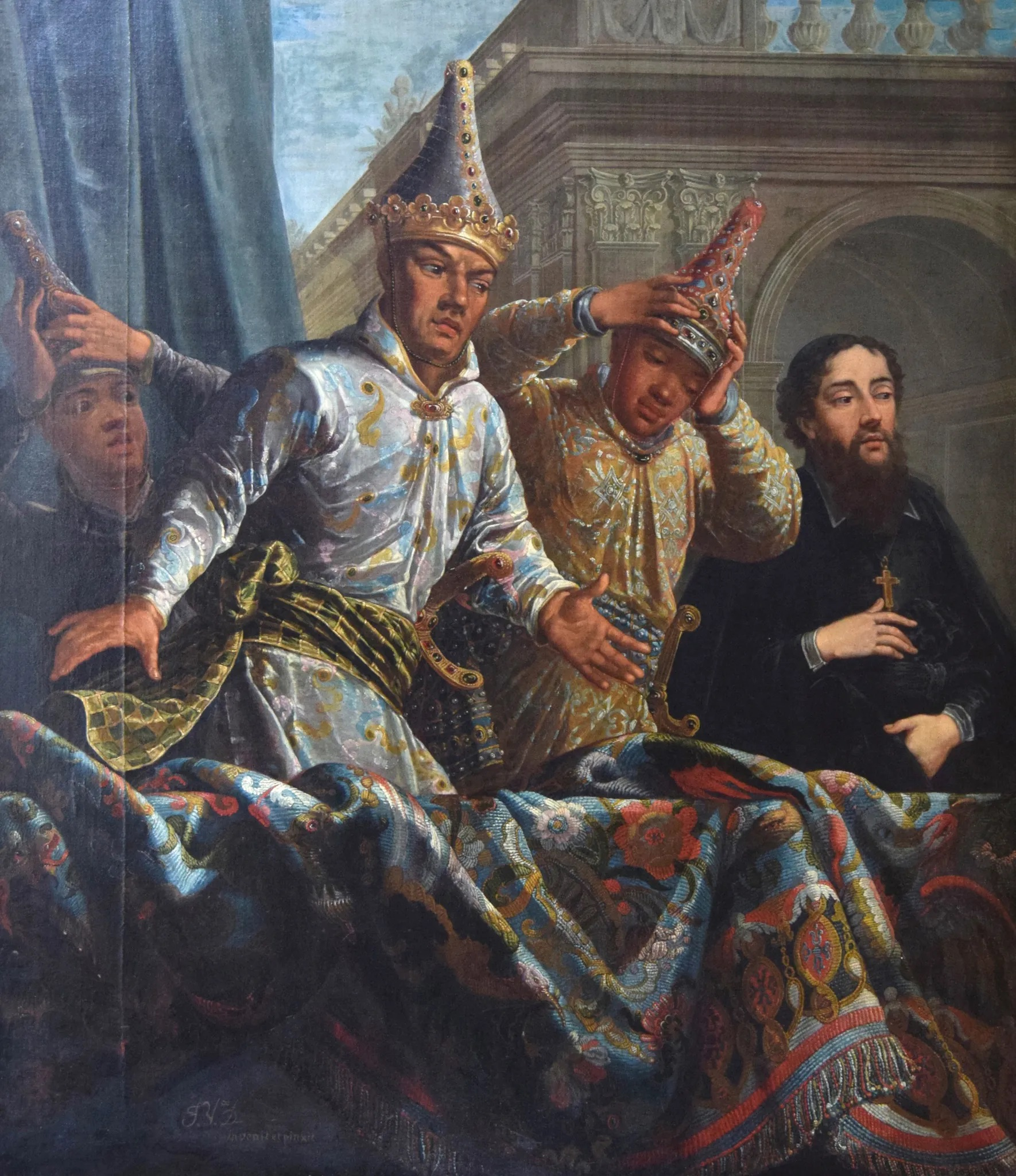
Painting by Jacques Vigouroux Duplessis showing the 1686 Siamese embassy to Louis XIV: Trois ambassadeurs siamois en costume de cérémonie, accompagnés de leur interprète, l'abbé Artus de Lionne, by Jacques Vigouroux Duplessis.

Jacques Vigouroux Duplessis, also Jacques Vigoureux-Duplessis (c.1680–1732) was a French painter. He was active from 1699 to 1730, and is mainly known for his Rococo Chinoiserie or Orientalist paintings, and decorative objects and scenes.

He painted scenery for the Paris Opera (then the Académie Royale de Musique) around the turn of the eighteenth century. In 1710, he lived with his wife Marie Prévost on Rue Fromenteau. His painting of the set of the tragic opera Atys survives, and print editions of operas Alceste (1708) and Armide (1710) included engravings based on his sets.

He moved to Brussels by 1715, where he registered as a master in the painters' guild. By 1719 he had returned to France, and began designing tapestries at the Royal Tapestry Manufacture in Beauvais. He was appointed “peintre et dessinateur de la Manufacture” in 1721, a position responsible for training artists, creating six designs annually, and restoring tapestries and cartoons. He held the post until 1726, when the new director Noël-Antoine de Mérou replaced him with Jean-Baptiste Oudry as chief painter.

Surviving work by Vigouroux-Duplessis includes mainly decorative works such as folding and fire screens. The last known work signed by Duplessis was a tripartite screen dated 1730, once in the possession of art dealer Jacques Helft.

== Gallery ==
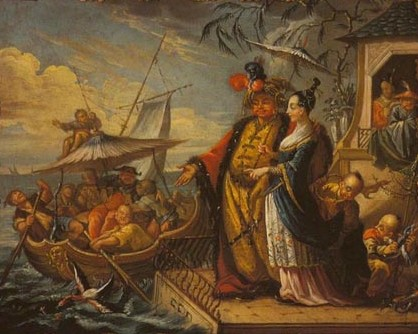
A Chinese Emperor With his Concubines Inspecting his Fantasy Fishing Fleet

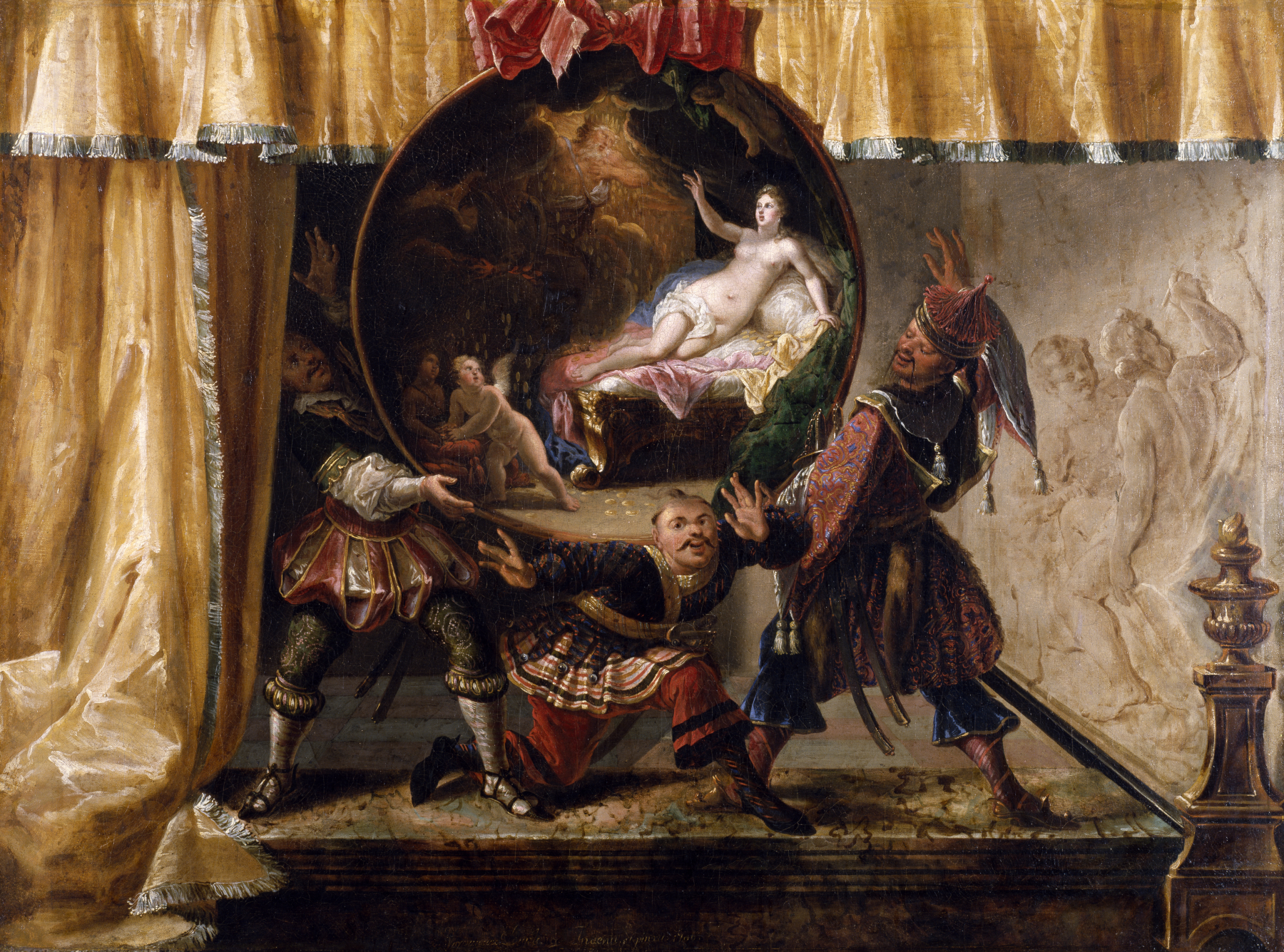
Chinoiserie. The Walters Art Museum.

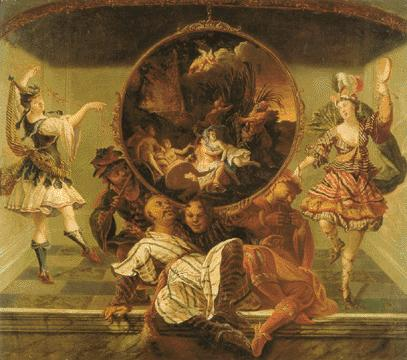
Chinoiserie Figures Surrounding a Painting Depicting a Satyr Threatening Diana and Her Nymphs

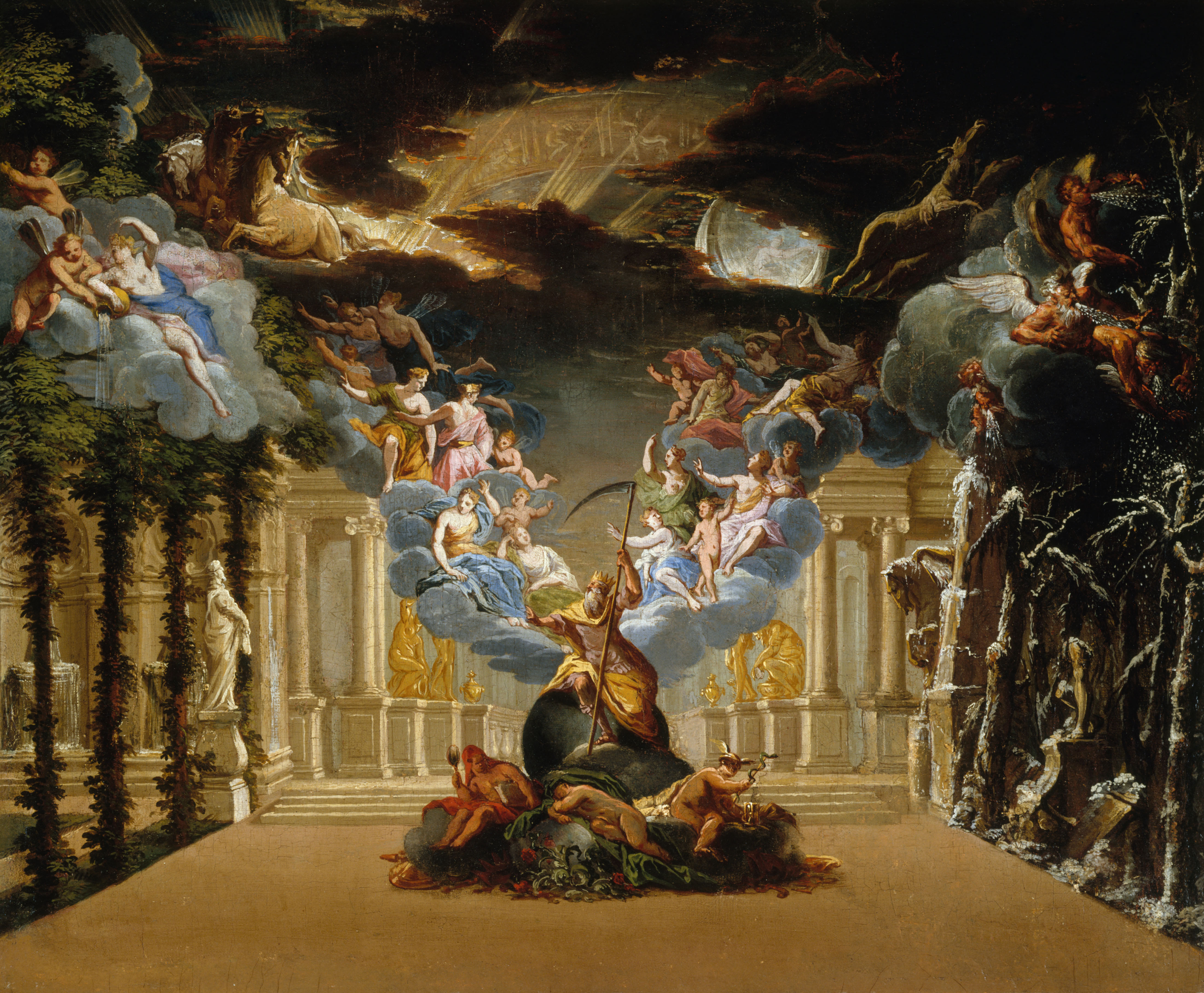
Le Palais du Temps Décor pour le prologue d'Atys, tragédie lyrique de Lully

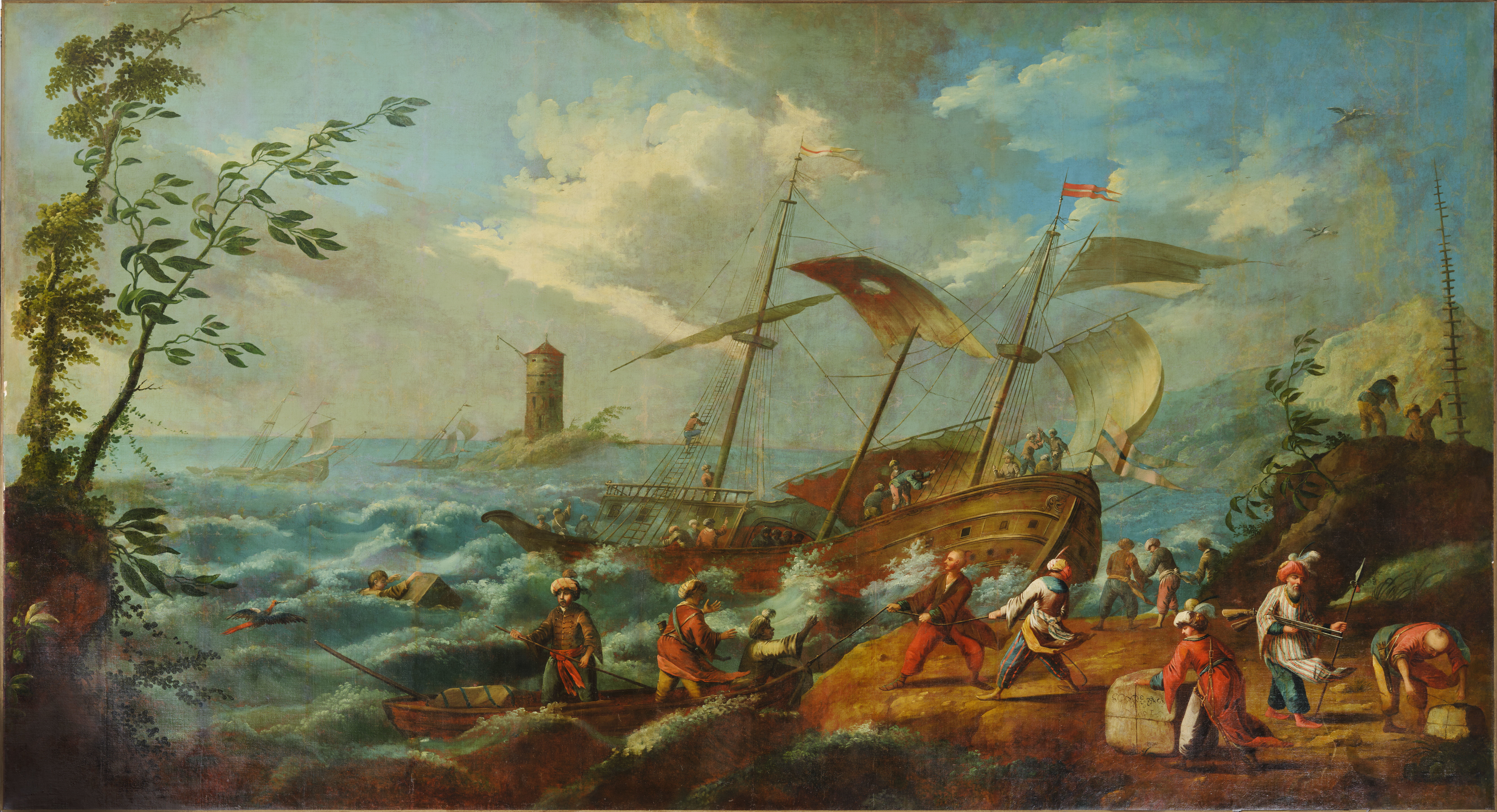
Déchargement d'un navire turc dans la tempête
