= Siamoise =

Various woven fabrics primarily made with cotton and linen

Woman in dress made of Siamoise ("Siamese") textile, 1687

Siamoise is a term for various woven fabric varieties, usually cotton and linen blends, with patterns such as checks and stripes. Siamoise was so named because it imitated clothing worn by 17th century Siamese ambassadors.

== History ==
At first, Siamoise was made with silk in warp and cotton filling yarn. The fabric resembled the clothing of the Siamese (Thai) ambassadors who visited King Louis XIV in 1684 and 1686. That is why the name 'Siamoise' was given to it.

== Modifications ==
Initially, the fabric was a combination of silk and cotton, and the silk warp weakened the material. Replacing the silk with linen produced a stronger fabric that was highly successful.

== Further additions ==
Since then, Siamoise has undergone many additions such as linen and cotton patterns, varied stripes, and checks and blends of different fibers such as silk and wool.

== Influences ==
The Siamese Embassy to France in 1686 had brought to the Court samples of multicolor Thai Ikat textiles. These were enthusiastically adopted by the French nobility to become Toiles flammées or Siamoises de Rouen, often with checkered blue-and-white designs. After the French Revolution and its dislike for foreign luxury, the textiles were named "Toiles des Charentes" or cottons of Provence.

== Gallery ==
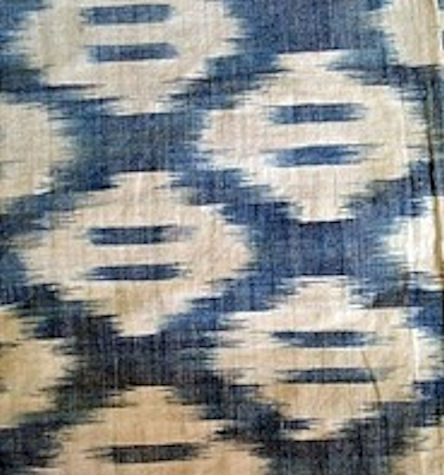
Siamoise flammée textile, derived from Thai Ikat, French manufacture, 18th century

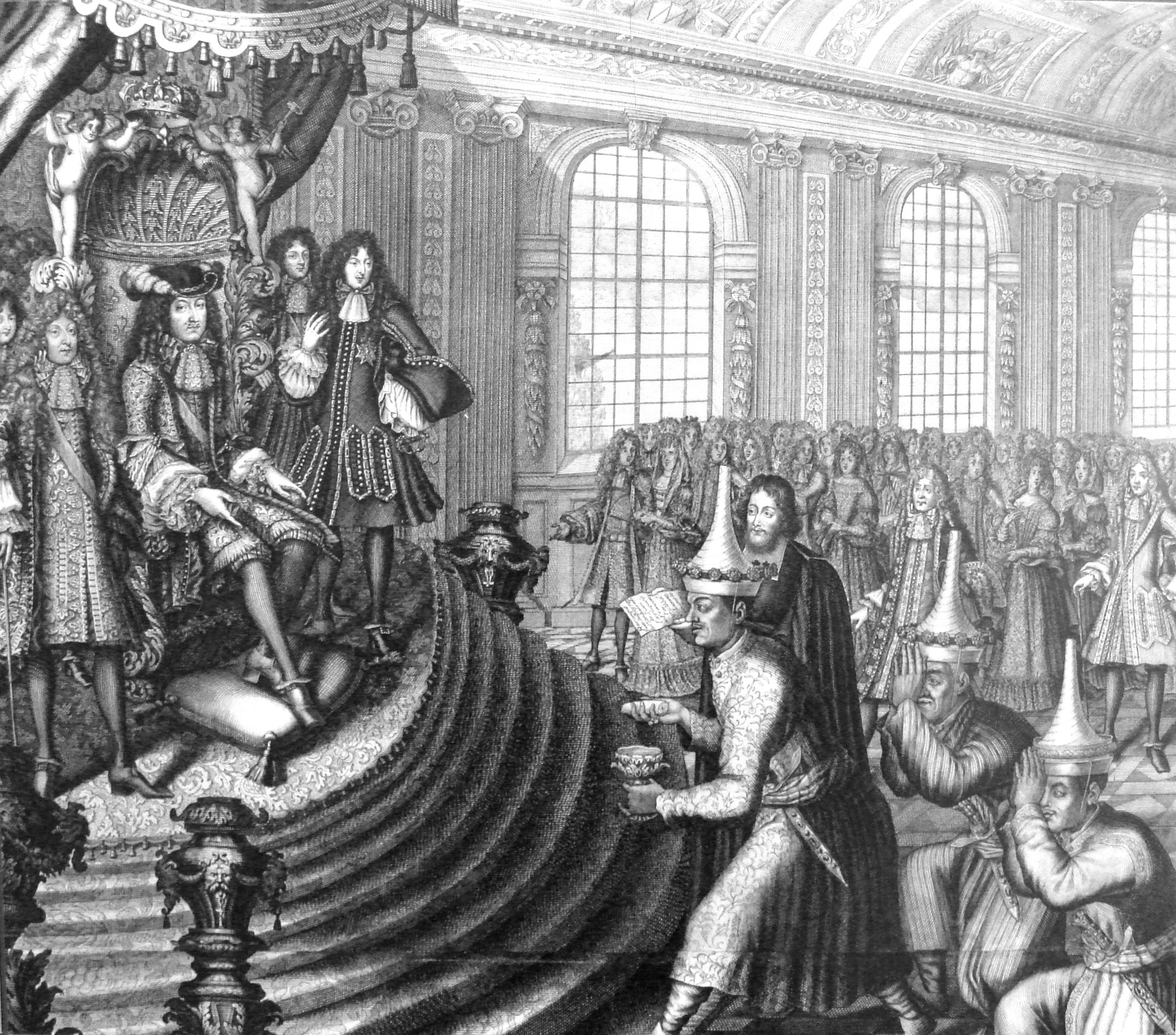
Siamese embassy to Louis XIV led by Kosa Pan in 1686, by Nicolas Larmessin

== See also ==
- Siamese embassy to France (1686)
- Orientalism in early modern France
