= Siamese embassy to France (1686) =

Embassy of the Kingdom of Siam

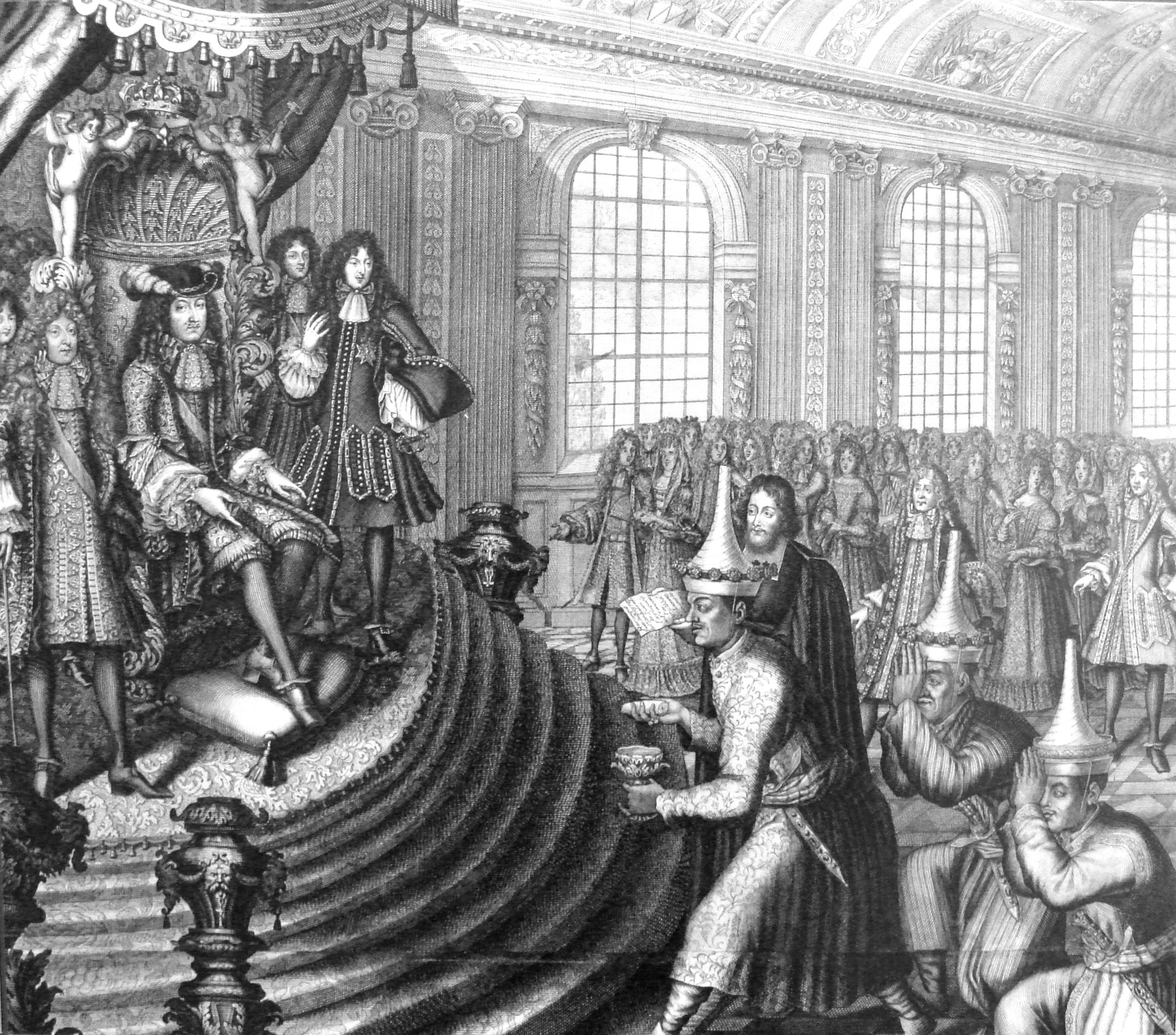
Siamese embassy to Louis XIV led by Kosa Pan in 1686, by Nicolas Larmessin

The Siamese embassy to France in 1686 was the second such mission from the Kingdom of Siam. The embassy was sent by King Narai and led by ambassador Kosa Pan. This embassy was preceded by the First Siamese Embassy to France, composed of two Siamese ambassadors and Father Bénigne Vachet, who had left Siam for France on January 5, 1684.

== The embassy ==
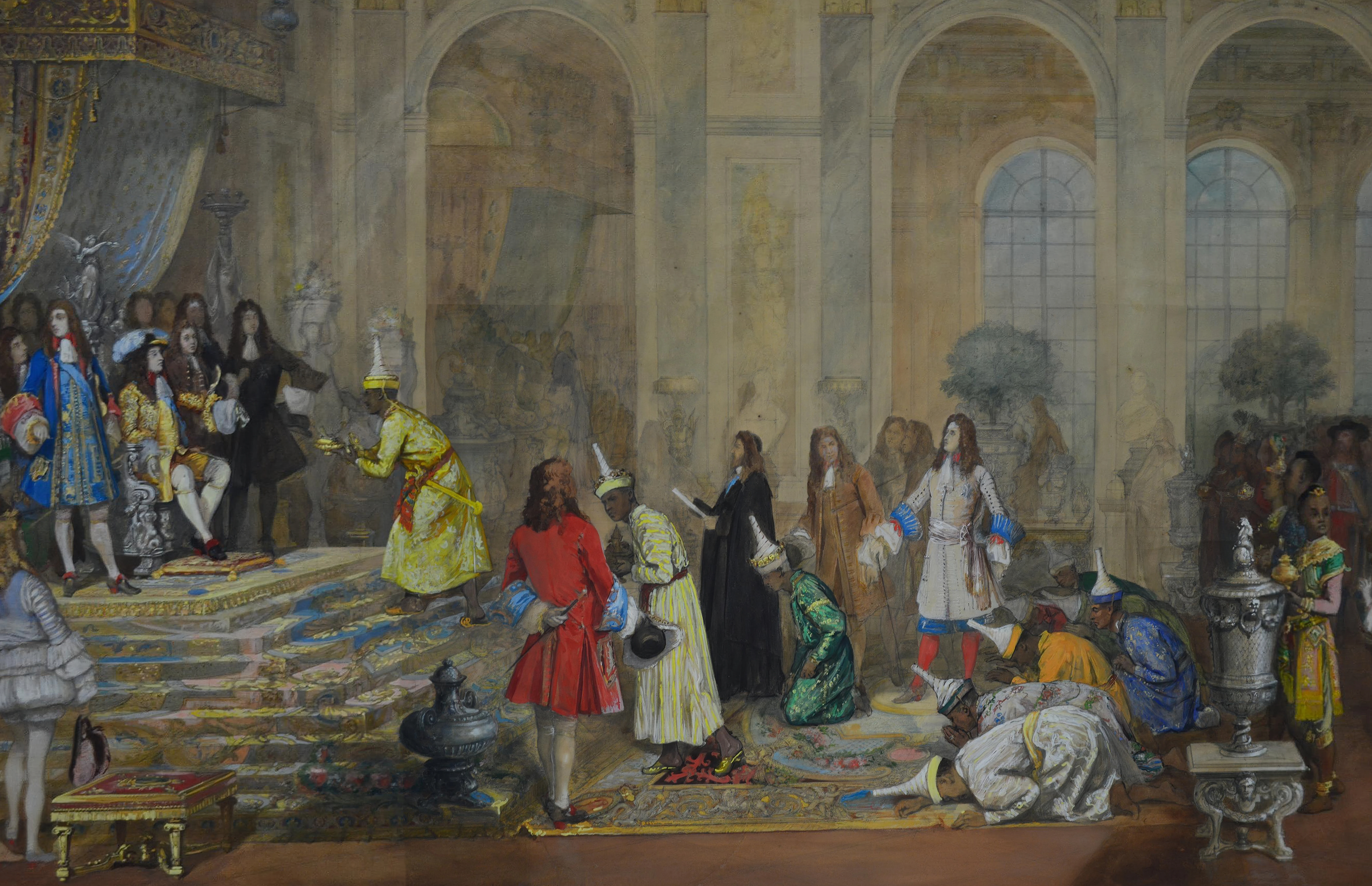
Kosa Pan presents King Narai's letter to Louis XIV at Versailles, September 1, 1686.

The embassy set out for France in 1686, accompanying the return of the 1685 French embassy to Siam of Chevalier de Chaumont and François-Timoléon de Choisy on two French ships. The embassy was bringing a proposal for an eternal alliance between France and Siam. It remained in France from June 1686 to March 1687. Kosa Pan was accompanied by two other Siamese ambassadors, Ok-luang Kanlaya Ratchamaitri and Ok-khun Si Wisan Wacha, and by the Jesuit Father Guy Tachard.

Kosa Pan's embassy was met with a rapturous reception and caused a sensation in the courts and society of Europe. The mission landed at Brest, France before continuing its journey to Versailles, constantly surrounded by crowds of curious onlookers.

The "exotic" clothes as well as manners of the envoys (including their kowtowing to Louis XIV during their palace visit on September 1, 1686), together with a special "machine" that was used to carry King Narai's missive to the French monarch caused much comment in French high society. The machine is called butsabok in Thai. Kosa Pan's great interest in French maps and images was noted in a contemporary issue of the Mercure Galant.

=== Presents ===
The embassy brought many gifts to present to Louis XIV, including gold, tortoise shells, fabrics, carpets, more than 1,500 pieces of porcelain, and lacquer furniture. Two silver Siamese cannons were presented to Louis XIV; they were seized by French revolutionaries in 1789 to be used in the Storming of the Bastille.

=== Purchases ===
The embassy ordered vast amounts of French products to be shipped to the Siamese court: 4,264 mirrors similar to those of the Galerie des Glaces were ordered to decorate Narai's palace, through Jean-Baptiste Colbert to the factory of Saint-Gobain. Among other orders were 160 French cannons, telescopes, glasses, clocks and various velvet pieces and crystal decorative elements. They also ordered two geographical globes, inscribed in Thai by French artisans, as well as seven carpets from the Savonnerie manufactory.

== Reception and cultural impact in France ==
The Siamese embassy attracted considerable attention in France. When the ambassadors arrived at the Palace of Versailles on 1 September 1686, they were greeted by a crowd of around 1,500 spectators. The reception was conducted with elaborate court ceremony: the envoys brought King Narai's letter in a specially prepared container, while the silver furnishings of Versailles were displayed along the route to the royal audience. The ambassadors bowed before Louis XIV, who subsequently invited them to visit the royal apartments and gardens.

Charles Le Brun, First Painter to Louis XIV, produced a portrait of Kosa Pan and accompanied him on visits to several prominent sites, including the Manufacture des Gobelins and the Hall of Mirrors. According to the Palace of Versailles, Le Brun was impressed by Kosa Pan's culture, refinement and curiosity. The embassy and its reception were represented in contemporary engravings and other works of art, and a medal was also produced to commemorate the mission.

The embassy also had an influence on French fashion and decorative arts. It brought to the French court samples of multicoloured Thai ikat textiles, which were enthusiastically adopted by the French nobility and inspired fabrics known as toiles flammées or siamoises de Rouen, often featuring blue-and-white checked designs. After the French Revolution and the accompanying rejection of foreign luxury, the textiles became known as "toiles des Charentes" or cottons of Provence.

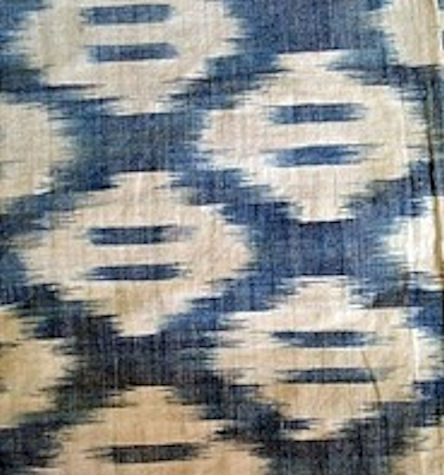
Siamoise flammée textile, derived from Thai ikat, French manufacture, 18th century

Woman in a dress made of siamoise ("Siamese") textile, 1687

A fragmentary Siamese account of the mission compiled by Kosa Pan was rediscovered in Paris in the 1980s. The surviving manuscript covers part of the embassy's journey in France and was later translated and published as The Diary of Kosa Pan.

The embassy of Kosa Pan was followed by another Siamese mission to France in 1688, led by Ok-khun Chamnan.

== Gallery ==
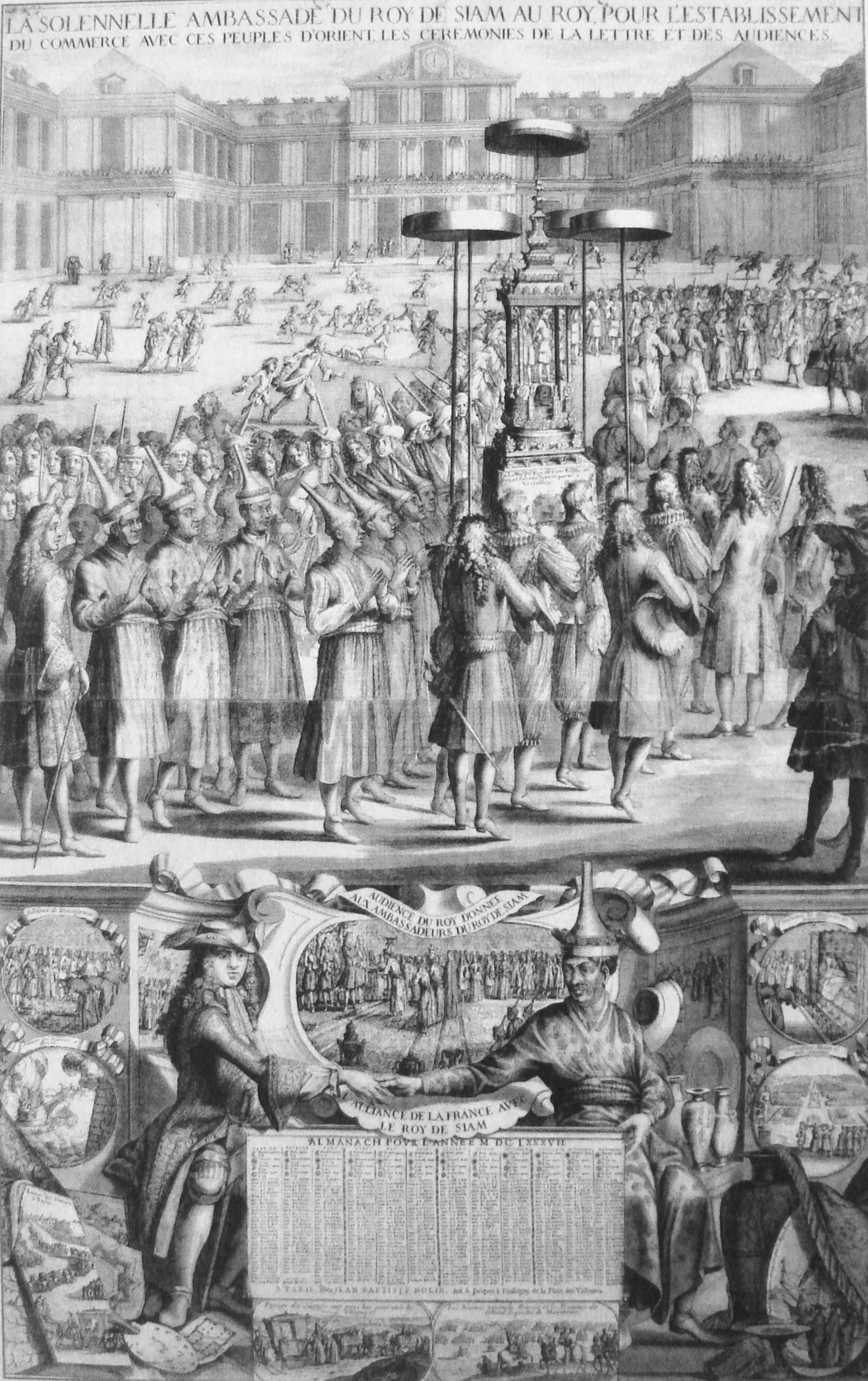
Depiction of the Siamese embassy in Versailles, in a 1687 French almanac. The butsabok machine carrying King Narai's missive is seen in the painting.

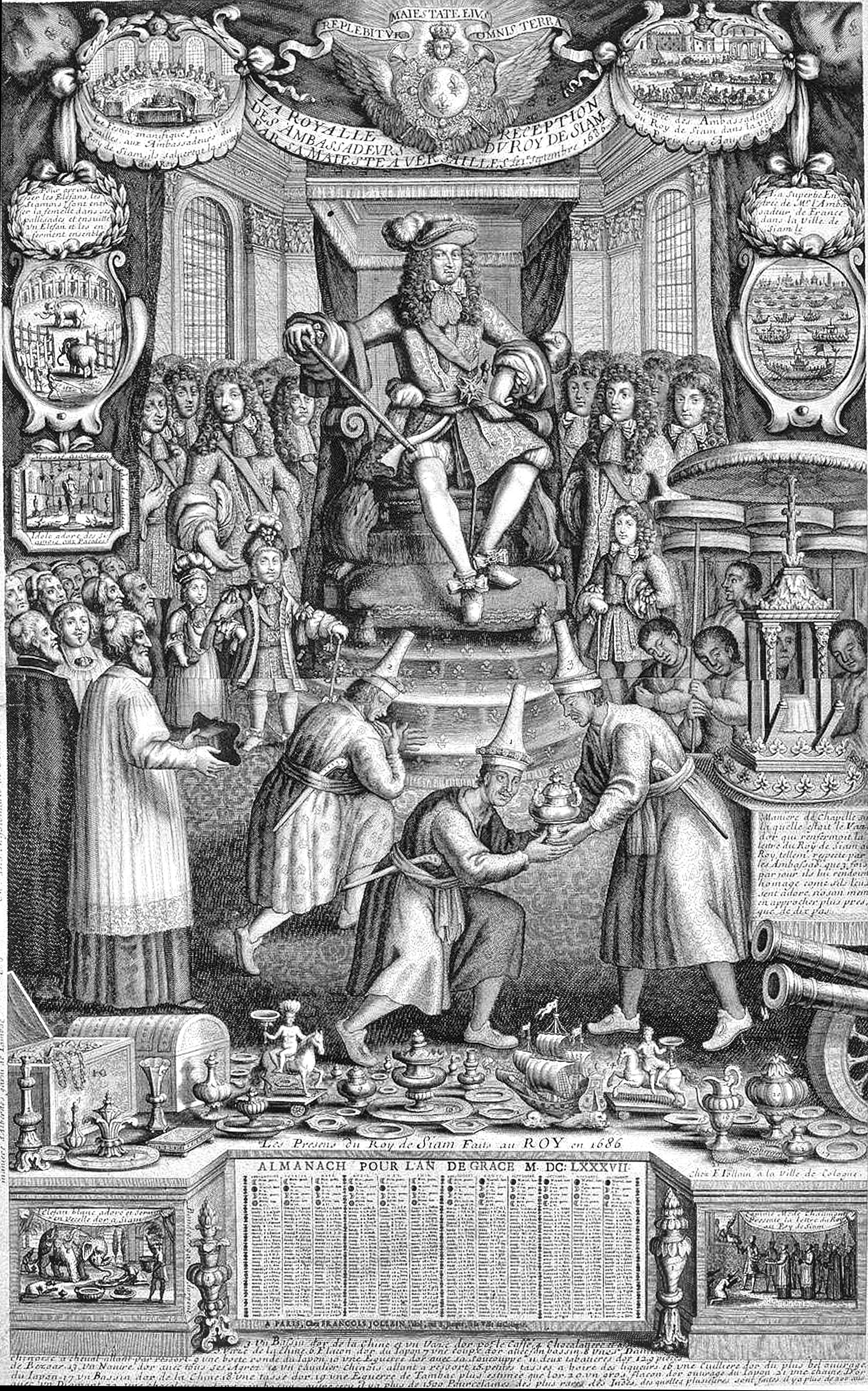
The embassy with Louis XIV

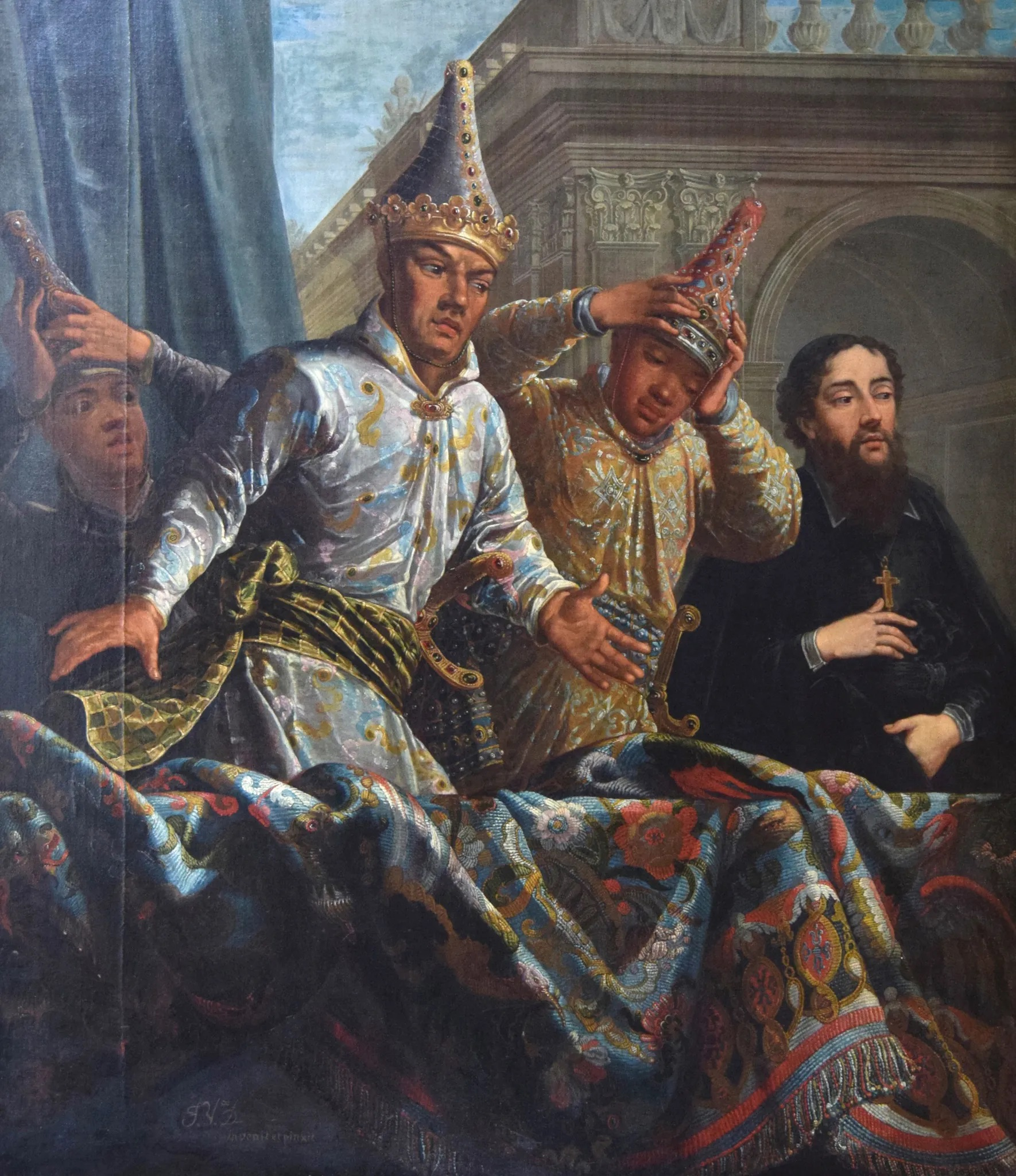
The 1686 Siamese embassy, accompanied by their translator, Abbot Artus de Lionne. Painted by Jacques Vigouroux Duplessis (c.1680—1732).

== See also ==
- France-Thailand relations
