= Palin (throne) =

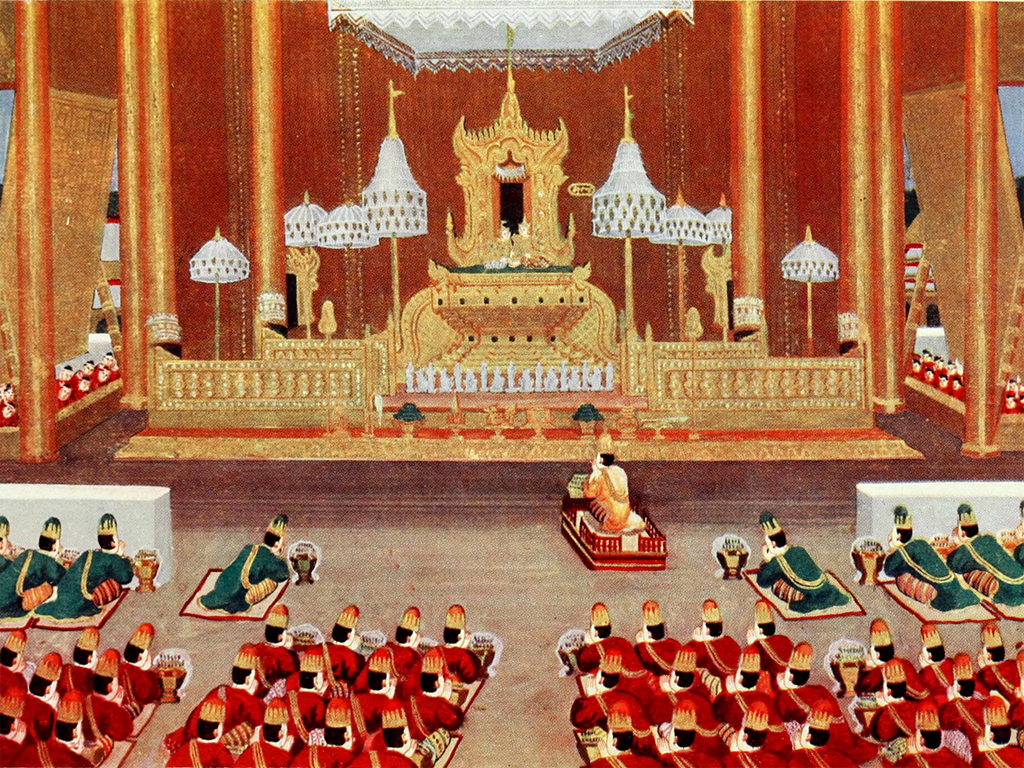
Depiction of the Burmese royal throne by a court painter, Saya Chone.

Palin (Burmese: ပလ္လင်; from Pali: pallaṅka, lit. 'couch' or 'sofa') refers to any one of six types of thrones recognized in traditional Burmese scholarship. The palin is an important symbol of the Burmese monarchy and features prominently in Burmese architecture and Burmese Buddhist iconography. The palin is featured on the seal of Myanmar's Ministry of Religious Affairs and Culture.

== Types of palin ==
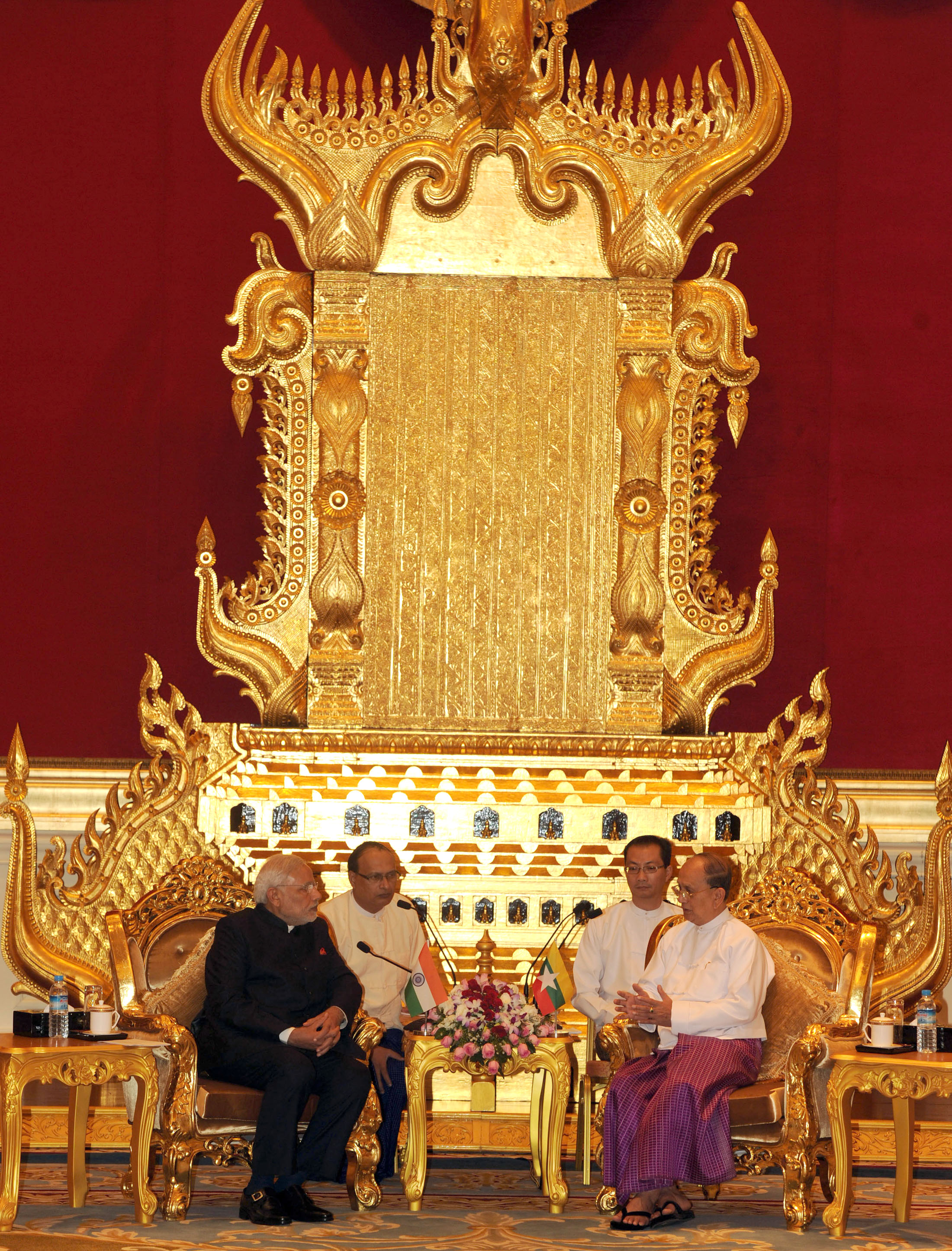
Former Burmese President Thein Sein and Indian prime minister Narendra Modi seated in the backdrop of a palin in Naypyidaw.

Traditional Burmese scholarship recognizes six types of thrones, namely:

1. Aparājitapallaṅka (အပရာဇိတပလ္လင်) – the Buddha's throne
2. Kamalāsanapallaṅka (ကမလာသနပလ္လင်) – Brahma's throne
3. Dibbāsanapallaṅka (ဒိဗ္ဗာသနပလ္လင်) – nat's throne
4. Rājapallaṅka (ရာဇပလ္လင်) – monarch's throne
5. Dhammāsanapallaṅka (ဓမ္မာသနပလ္လင်) – Buddhist monk's throne
6. Aṭṭakaraṇapallaṅka (အဋ္ဋကရဏပလ္လင်) – judge's throne

== Usage by Burmese monarchs ==
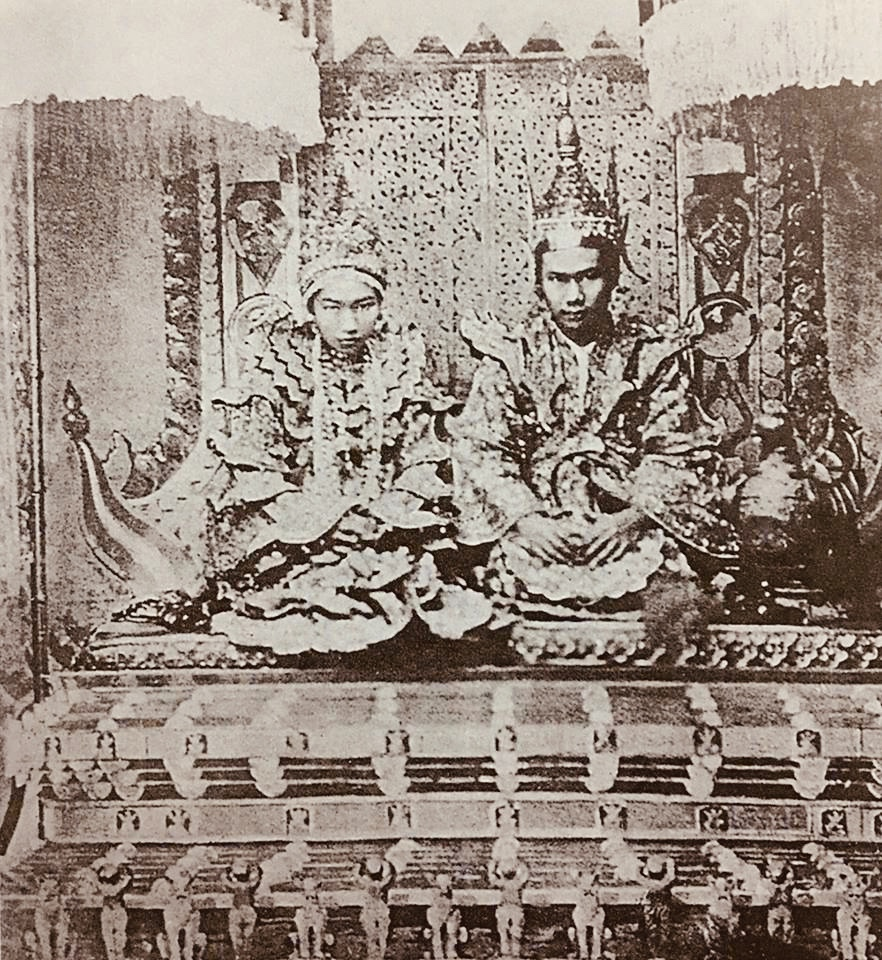
King Thibaw and Queen Supayalat seated on The Bumblebee Throne in Glass Hall at Mandalay Palace

In pre-colonial times, the rājapallaṅka (Burmese yazapalin) seated the sovereign and his chief consort. Traditionally, Burmese palaces possessed eight types of thrones, housed in nine palace halls, leading to the Burmese adage, "eight thrones, nine palace halls" (ပလ္လင်ရှစ်ခန်း ရွှေနန်းကိုးဆောင်).

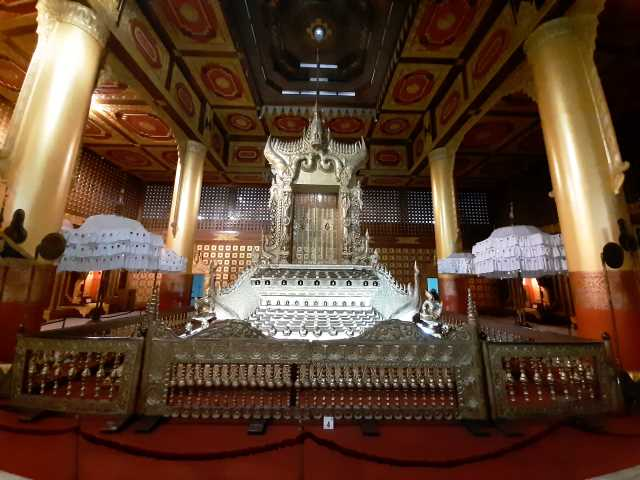
The Lion Throne from Mandalay Palace was preserved and is now displayed at the National Museum of Myanmar in Yangon.

The thrones were carved of wood, specifically by hereditary palace carpenters. An auspicious time was chosen by astrologers to commence operations, and construction of these thrones was heralded by a royal ceremony to propitiate spirits. The thrones were simultaneously constructed according to a prescribed list of requirements, coated with resin, and decorated with gold leaf and glass mosaic.

The most important throne was the "Lion Throne" (Sīhāsanapallaṅka), which had a replica in the Hluttaw as well.

The thrones used different prescribed motifs and designs, types of wood, and were allocated to specific halls in the royal palace. The thrones were also grouped by height, as follows:

1. Mahāpallaṅka (မဟာပလ္လင်) – 24 feet (7.3 m)
2. Majjhimapallaṅka (မဇ္စျိမပလ္လင်) – 12 feet (3.7 m)
3. Cuḷapallaṅka (စူဠပလ္လင်) – 6 feet (1.8 m)

Below is a list of these eight types of thrones:

No.	Name (Pali)	Name (Burmese)	Primary motif	Type of wood	Location(s) in palace	Photo
1	Sīhāsanapallaṅka	သီဟာသနပလ္လင်	Chinthe (lion)	Gmelina arborea	Royal Audience Hall; Hluttaw	
2	Bhamarāsanapallaṅka	ဘမယာသနပလ္လင်	Bumblebee	Cinnamomum tamala	Glass Palace	
3	Padumāsanapallaṅka	ပဒုမ္မာသနပလ္လင်	Lotus	Artocarpus heterophyllus	Western Audience Hall	
4	Haṃsāsanapallaṅka	ဟံသာသနပလ္လင်	Hamsa (bird)	Hopea odorata	Eastern Hall of Victory	
5	Gajāsanapallaṅka	ဂဇာသနပလ္လင်	Elephant	Magnolia champaca	Byedaik (Privy Council)	
6	Saṅkhāsanapallaṅka	သင်္ခါသနပလ္လင်	Conch	Mangifera indica	Regalia Hall	
7	Migāsanapallaṅka	မိဂါသနပလ္လင်	Deer	Ficus glomerata	Southern Gatehouse Hall	
8	Mayurāsanapallaṅka	မယုရာသနပလ္လင်	Peacock	Butea monosperma	Northern Gatehouse Hall	

== Usage in Buddhism ==
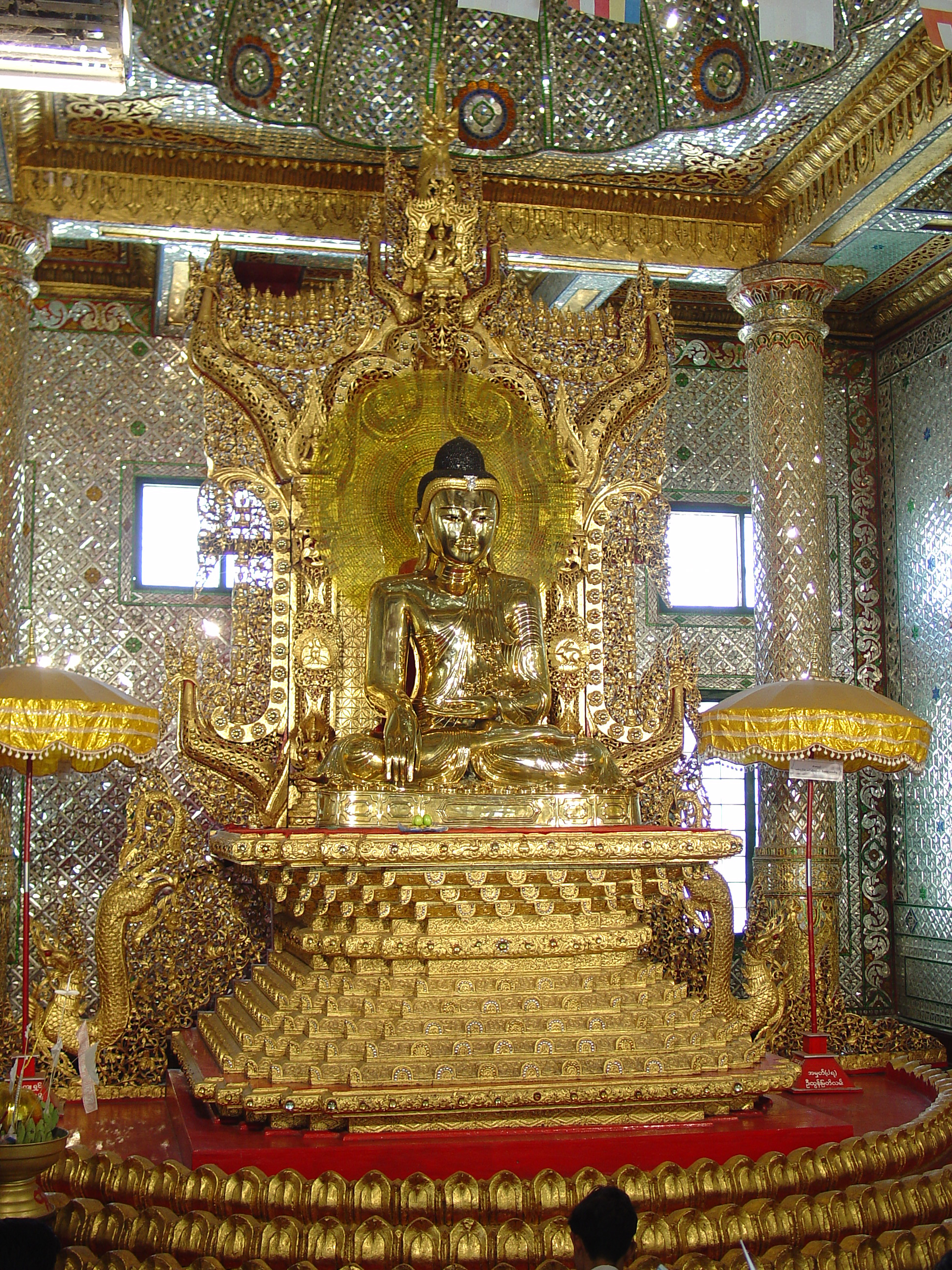
A throne seating an image of the Buddha at Botataung Pagoda.

The palin is also used to seat images and statues of the Buddha, variously called gaw palin (ဂေါ့ပလ္လင်), phaya palin (ဘုရားပလ္လင်) or samakhan (စမ္မခဏ်), from the Pali term sammakhaṇḍa. This palin is a feature of many Buddhist household shrines in Burma.

== See also ==
- Busabok, the Thai equivalent
- Throne
