= Paul Rosenberg (art dealer) =

French art dealer (1881–1959)

- Rosenberg, with Odalisque, 1937, by Henri Matisse
- Born: 29 December 1881; Paris, France
- Died: 29 June 1959 (aged 77); Neuilly-sur-Seine, France
- Occupation: Art dealer
- Years active: 1898–1959
- Known for: Representative/dealer for numerous impressionist/post-impressionist artists including Georges Braque, Henri Matisse, and Pablo Picasso
- Spouse: Marguérite "Margot" Ida Loévi (m. 1914)
- Children: Alexandre Paul Rosenberg (1921-1987); Micheline Nanette Rosenberg (1917-2006)
- Parent(s): Alexandre Rosenberg; Mathilde Jellinek
- Relatives: Léonce Rosenberg (Brother); Anne Sinclair (Granddaughter)

Paul Rosenberg (29 December 1881 – 29 June 1959) was a French art dealer. He represented Pablo Picasso, Georges Braque and Henri Matisse. Both Paul and his brother Léonce Rosenberg were among the world's major dealers of modern art.

== Career ==
The younger son of Jewish antiques dealer Alexandre Rosenberg, Paul and his elder brother Léonce joined their father's business. Alexandre had emigrated from Bratislava to Paris and established an antiques gallery in 1878, beginning to collect Monet, Cézanne, Manet and Renoir, and by 1898 had become a noted dealer of Impressionist and Post-Impressionist art. He educated his sons in this passion by allowing them both a grand tour via London, Berlin, Vienna and New York to acquire experience and contacts. During the tour, Paul bought two van Gogh drawings and a Manet portrait for $220, which he had transported to his father's gallery and sold onwards at a profit. From 1906 on, the brothers worked as partners within the business. When their father retired, they became directors. Having established their own networks, the brothers opened their own separate galleries in the city's 8th arrondissement, with Paul at 21 rue La Boétie (opened in 1911) and Léonce in the rue de la Baume.

=== Paris: 1911–1940 ===
Léonce became a noted champion of Cubism, a lead that Paul followed, but being located in a more noted art district, he gained better contacts and greater finances. Working initially with his brother-in-law Daniel-Henry Kahnweiler, Paul and his partner Georges Wildenstein established and then won over from Kahnweiler exclusive relationships with: Picasso (from 1918); Braque (1922); Marie Laurencin; Fernand Léger (1927); and latterly Matisse (1936).

As Picasso’s biographer John Richardson notes, “the “contract” that Picasso and Paul Rosenberg negotiated never existed on paper; it would be a matter of mutual trust. Picasso granted the dealer a droit de première vue: to be the first to see all current works offered for sale, and either take them or refuse. The arrangement was backed by Georges Wildenstein, who had entered into partnership with Rosenberg, as the dealers agreed to split the Picasso market between them. They bought from him in equal shares, Wildenstein representing his work in America and Rosenberg in Europe. Yet, from the beginning, Wildenstein remained discreetly in the background. Rosenberg was the dealer publicly associated with Picasso”. “This partnership would end abruptly in 1932, when Rosenberg found out about his wife’s affair with Wildenstein”

Paul's stock included pieces by all of the classical and contemporary French and major European artists, and latterly American artists, including: Marsden Hartley; Max Weber; Abraham Rattner; Karl Knaths; Harvey Weiss; Oronzio Maldarelli; Nicolas de Staël; Graham Sutherland; Kenneth Armitage; and Giacomo Manzù. The result was that from 1920, Paul Rosenberg's company was widely acknowledged to be the most active and influential gallery in the world.

With the early artist relationships, like Kahnweiler had, Rosenberg gave the artists financial security by agreeing to buy their works on the basis of an exclusive contract. Rosenberg lent Picasso money after his honeymoon with the ballerina Olga Khokhlova and found them an apartment (and an identical apartment to serve as Picasso's studio right above it) in Paris at 23-bis rue La Boétie next to his own family home, generosity which resulted in a lifelong friendship between these two very different men. Rosenberg's purchases from Picasso included Nude, Green Leaves and Bust (1932), a portrait of Picasso's mistress Marie-Thérèse Walter, which Rosenberg sold in New York in 1951 to Frances Lasker Brody. Every summer the Rosenberg family and the Picasso family would depart for the South of France, holidaying there with friends including F. Scott Fitzgerald, Somerset Maugham, Stravinsky, Ravel and Matisse.

By 1935 along his brother-in-law Jacques Helft, a noted antiques dealer, he opened a branch in Bond Street, London, to enable them to engage with more Americans. Noted clients included museums such as the Museum of Modern Art (MoMA) (of which Rosenberg was an early supporter and donor), and the Philadelphia Museum of Art. His private clients included Alfred H. Barr, Jr., Chester Dale, Douglas Dillon, and Marjorie and Duncan Phillips, who through purchases from Rosenberg created much of the modern collections within The Phillips Collection in Washington, D.C.

In the late 1930s, Rosenberg, alert to signs of an approaching war, began quietly moving his collection out of continental Europe to the London branch and to storage in America (via the 1939 New York World's Fair), Australia, and later to South America. He then stopped adding to his collection in France, and advised his artists to make similar arrangements. Although his relocation plans were well advanced, by the time of the 1940 Nazi invasion of France, he still held over 2,000 pieces in the country, both in his gallery and in storage. The Rosenbergs were Jewish and had to flee Nazi-occupied France. They owed their lives to the Portuguese Consul-General in Bordeaux, Aristides de Sousa Mendes, who issued them visas to his country.

In July 1940, Nazi Alfred Rosenberg (no relation) established the Parisian base of the Einsatzstab Reichsleiter Rosenberg (ERR), whose purpose was to confiscate masonic artifacts and the highest-quality works of art for Hitler's planned Führermuseum in Linz, Austria. All looted art works, including Paul Rosenberg's, were initially shipped by truck to the depot created in the Galerie nationale du Jeu de Paume. There Nazi art historians, experts, photographers, and maintenance and administrative personnel appraised, filed, photographed and packed what were now termed "ownerless cultural goods" for rail transport to Germany. French officials at the end of the war estimated that one-third of all art in French private hands had been confiscated.

=== New York: 1940–1959 ===
Rosenberg, his wife, his daughter Micheline and her husband Joseph Robert Schwartz, all travelled via Lisbon, arriving at the Madison Hotel in New York in September 1940. There, with the help of well-established friends and pieces that he had already disbursed around the world, he established a new gallery at No. 79 East 57th Street. The opening was well received by the art world, and garnered a four-page notice within Art Digest.

From this base post-war, Rosenberg managed to reclaim and re-purchase a number of pieces from his pre-war collection, but these represented less than half of the works he had lost. After the end of hostilities, he personally traveled to Paris to hear the tales of the family chauffeur Louis, who told of the coming of ERR trucks not long after the family had departed. On this first trip, Rosenberg managed to regain the 1918 Picasso portrait of his wife and daughter—one of three—renamed by Göring Mother and Child—from a small museum in Paris.

Rosenberg later regained a number of pieces after their confiscation by the US Army. In 1953, an exhibition of 89 pieces from Rosenberg's personal and private post-war collection were displayed at MoMA. These included Nude Reclining by the Sea (1868) by Gustave Courbet, which was taken on 5 September 1941 by the ERR in a raid on Rosenberg's bank vault in Bordeaux together with another 162 of his paintings. The Courbet was cataloged at the Jeu de Paume in December 1941. It was later recovered from Göring's personal collection and repatriated to Rosenberg in New York. Rosenberg sold it in April 1953 to the New York collector Louis E. Stern, who donated it in 1964 to the Philadelphia Museum of Art.

He also purchased the Three Musicians (MoMA version) from Pablo Picasso in fall of 1921 and gave it to the MoMA in 1949.

Pablo Picasso, 1921, Three Musicians, oil on canvas, 200.7 × 222.9 cm, Museum of Modern Art, New York. Acquired by Paul Rosenberg

Alexandre P. Rosenberg joined his father in New York in 1946 and became a partner in 1952. After the death of his father in 1959 in Neuilly-sur-Seine, Alexandre became the company's principal. In 1962 Alexandre was a co-founder and first President of the Art Dealers Association of America, remaining one of the association's permanent board members throughout his life. He also served as an advisor to both the American Government and the Internal Revenue Service on matters pertaining to art works. After Alexandre's premature death in 1987 in London from an aneurysm, while attending the reunion of the US Army Second Armored Division, his wife Elaine took over the business. Following the death of Micheline in 2007, the family agreed to donate their grandfather's archives to MoMA, which held a supporting exhibition of the collection in 2010.

== Art collection recovery ==
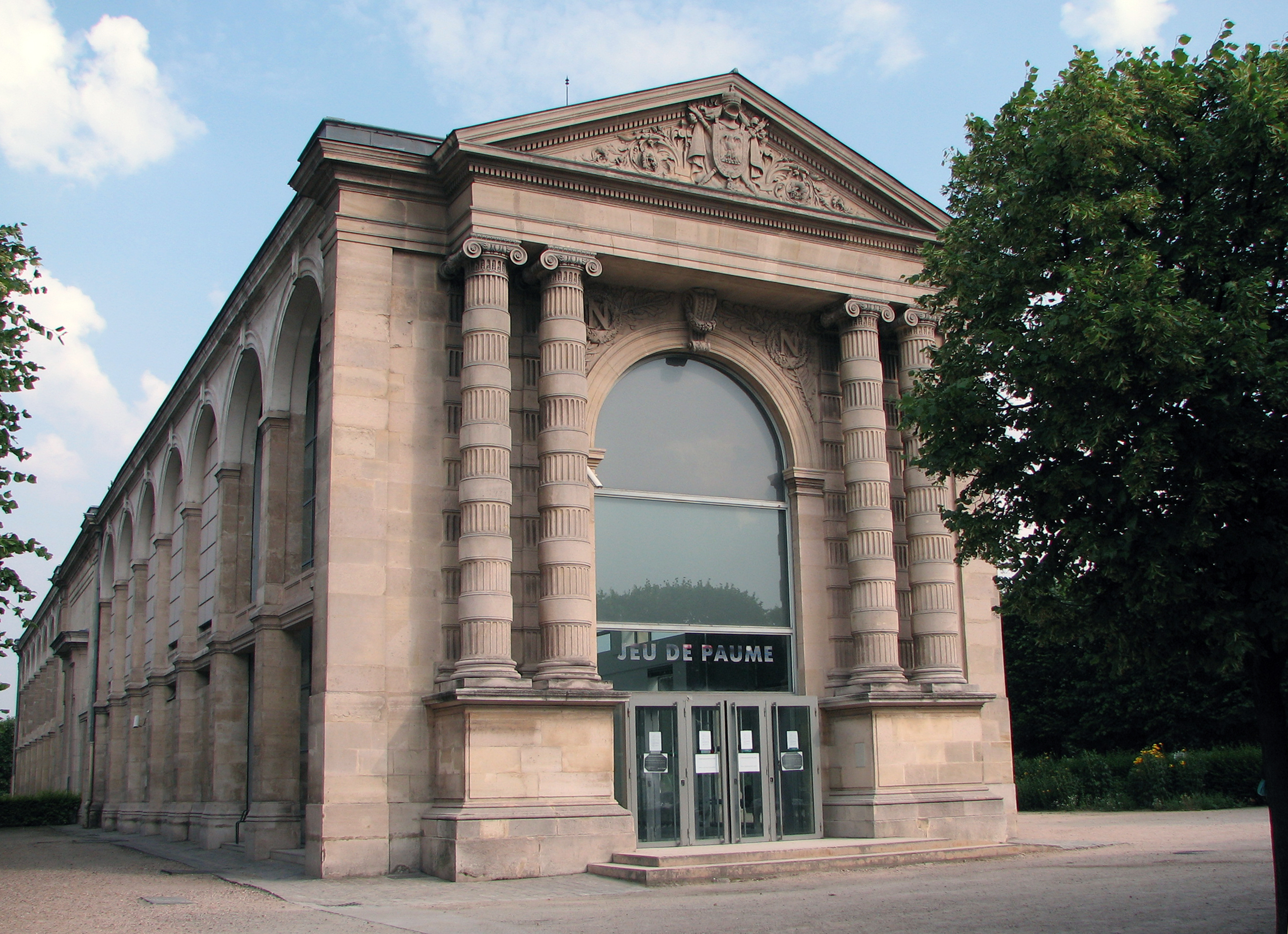
Galerie nationale du Jeu de Paume

Because the Nazis banned so-called "degenerate art" from entering Germany, art so designated in France was looted and held in what became known as the "Martyr's Room" at the Galerie nationale du Jeu de Paume in Paris. Much of Rosenberg's professional and personal collection was branded as "degenerate art" and thereby fell under the mandate of the Commission for the Exploitation of Degenerate Art. Following Joseph Goebbels personal directive to sell these degenerate works for foreign currency to fund the building of the Führermuseum and the wider war effort, Hermann Göring appointed a series of ERR-approved dealers to liquidate these assets. Göring instructed them to give him the proceeds, with which he intended to grow his personal art collection. With much of this looted art sold onwards via Switzerland, Rosenberg's collection was scattered across Europe.

Today, some 70 of his paintings are missing, including the large Pablo Picasso watercolor, Naked Woman on the Beach, painted in Provence in 1923; seven works by Matisse; and the Portrait of Gabrielle Diot by Degas.

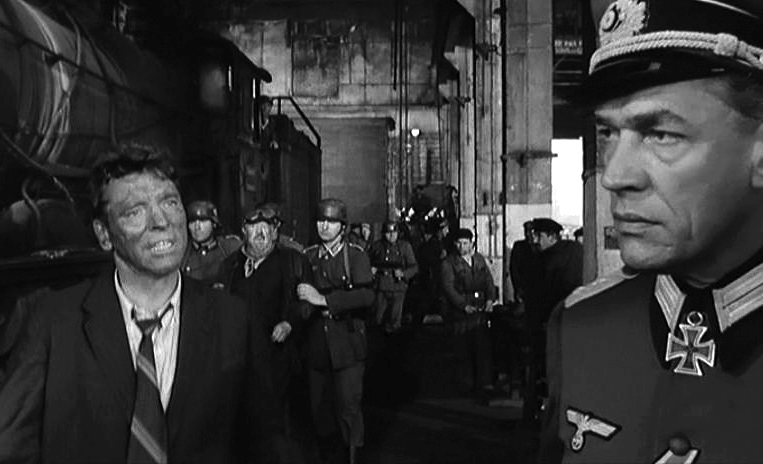
L. to R.: Burt Lancaster, Michel Simon (background) and Paul Scofield in The Train - trailer

In June 1940, via the Dunkirk evacuation, his son Alexandre Rosenberg had escaped to England. There he was commissioned as a Lieutenant into the Free French Forces. After being part of the D-Day Invasion, in August 1944 north of Paris a troop under the command of Lt. Rosenberg dynamited tracks north of Nazi train No. 40,044 and seized it, as it was attempting to transfer looted treasures to Germany. Upon his soldiers opening the train's boxcar doors, Alexandre viewed many plundered pieces of art that had once been displayed in the home of his father. The seizure saved about 400 pieces of his father's art from being lost, including many masterpieces. Alexandre was demobilized in 1946, and left immediately for his family in New York to join his father's business. The train's interception was the inspiration for the 1964 film The Train, starring Burt Lancaster, Paul Scofield, Jeanne Moreau and Michel Simon.

In the mid-1950s, Rosenberg lost a French lawsuit that he started to recover a Matisse in the south of France, after the judge decreed the masterpiece belonged to the defendant, Rosenberg's own family kin. After the death of Paul, the family agreed under Alexandre to continue to try to recover the family art works. Consequently, in 1971 they bought back the Degas Deux Danseuses for far below its worth.

In December 1987, while reading at the Frick Museum in New York, Elaine Rosenberg found the painting Portrait of Gabrielle Diot by Degas listed for sale in an art magazine at the Mathias F. Hans Gallery in Hamburg. The listing included the fact that it had come to the current owner via the dealership of Paul Rosenberg. After she called the dealer and explained her connection to the looted picture, the dealer explained that under his confidentiality rules he could not disclose the current owner's name, but promised to let her know this very important piece of information. On calling a few days later, Elaine Rosenberg was told by the dealer that the "owner" had taken the piece from the gallery and disappeared without leaving any forwarding details.

His granddaughter is TV journalist Anne Sinclair, host of political shows and the former wife of Dominique Strauss-Kahn. In October 1997, Rosenberg's heirs filed suit in United States District Court for the Western District of Washington, Seattle, to recover the painting Odalisque (1927 or 1928) by Matisse from the Seattle Art Museum, the first lawsuit against an American museum concerning ownership of art looted by Nazis during World War II. Then museum director Mimi Gardner Gates brokered an 11th hour settlement that returned the artwork, after which the museum sued the gallery which had sold it the painting in the 1950s. As the sole heir to her parents' estate, after the death of her mother Micheline in 2007, Sinclair sold the painting at auction, raising in excess of $33m. In the same year she also donated the 1918 Picasso painting of her grandmother and mother to the Musée Picasso in Paris.

=== Recent developments ===
In 2012, German tax authorities found pieces from Rosenberg's collection in an apartment owned by Cornelius Gurlitt, son of 1930s German art dealer Hildebrand Gurlitt, in Schwabing, Munich. Over 1,500 pieces were recovered with an estimated value of up to €1bn, including Portrait of a Woman by Matisse that Rosenberg had left behind after fleeing Paris. Gurlitt's collection was sent to a secure warehouse in Garching. Authorities are presently cataloging the works, researching their pre-war owners, and any surviving relatives.

In 2012, the Rosenberg family identified Profil bleu devant la cheminée (Woman in Blue in Front of Fireplace; 1937), a Matisse painting that was confiscated by the Nazis in 1941, in an exhibition catalogue and demanded that the Henie-Onstad Art Centre (HOK) near Oslo, Norway, return it. Rosenberg had bought the painting directly from Matisse in 1937 and had it stored at the time of the Nazi invasion in a bank vault in Libourne, a commune in the Gironde in Aquitaine, southwestern France. The ERR entered the vault in March 1941, and, after cataloging at the Galerie nationale du Jeu de Paume in September 1941, it was earmarked for Göring's private collection. Then in the hands of various dealers during the Nazi period, post-war in the late 1940s it was bought by Norwegian shipping magnate Niels Onstad from the Paris-based dealer Henri Bénézit. It has since appeared in numerous publications and toured the world on several occasions. Although under Norwegian law, due to the period of ownership, the painting now belongs to HOK, Norway was one of 44 signatories to the 1998 Washington Conference Principles on Nazi-Confiscated Art. Protracted mediation, overseen by Christopher A. Marinello of the Art Recovery Group, saw the painting returned to the heirs of Paul Rosenberg in March 2014.

In May 2015, Marinello also recovered, for the Rosenberg heirs, Portrait of a Seated Woman by Henri Matisse, which had been found in the Munich home of Cornelius Gurlitt.

== In popular culture ==
Rosenberg is played by Will Keen in the 2018 television series Genius, which focuses on the life and art of Pablo Picasso.
