= Royal Barge Anantanakkharat =

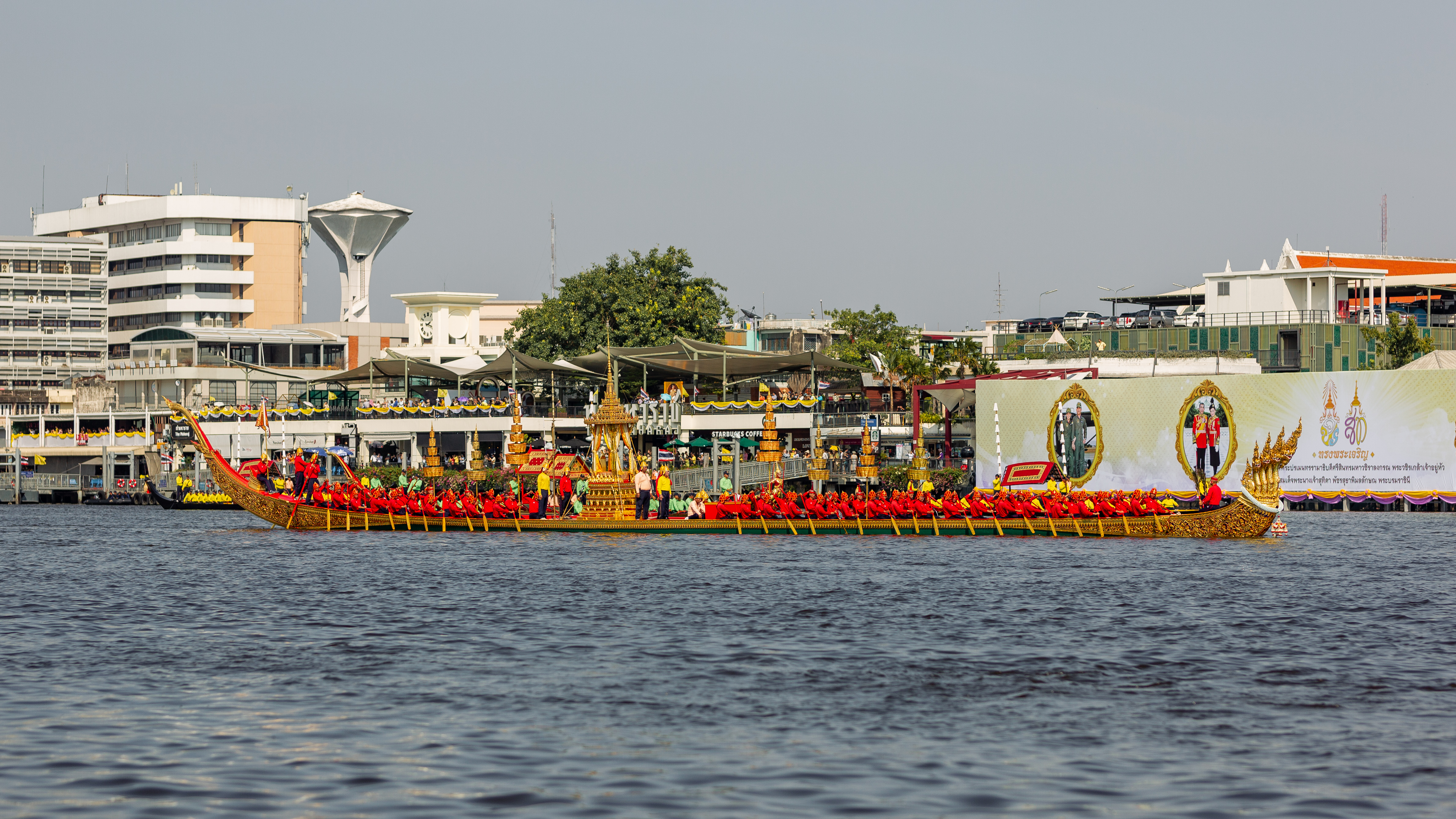

History

Thailand
- Name: Anantanakkharat
- Namesake: Shesha
- Owner: Bureau of the Royal Household
- Operator: Royal Thai Navy

General characteristics
- Type: Royal barge
- Displacement: 10 tons
- Length: 42.95 m
- Beam: 2.95 m
- Draught: 0.31 m
- Depth: 0.76 m
- Crew: 61

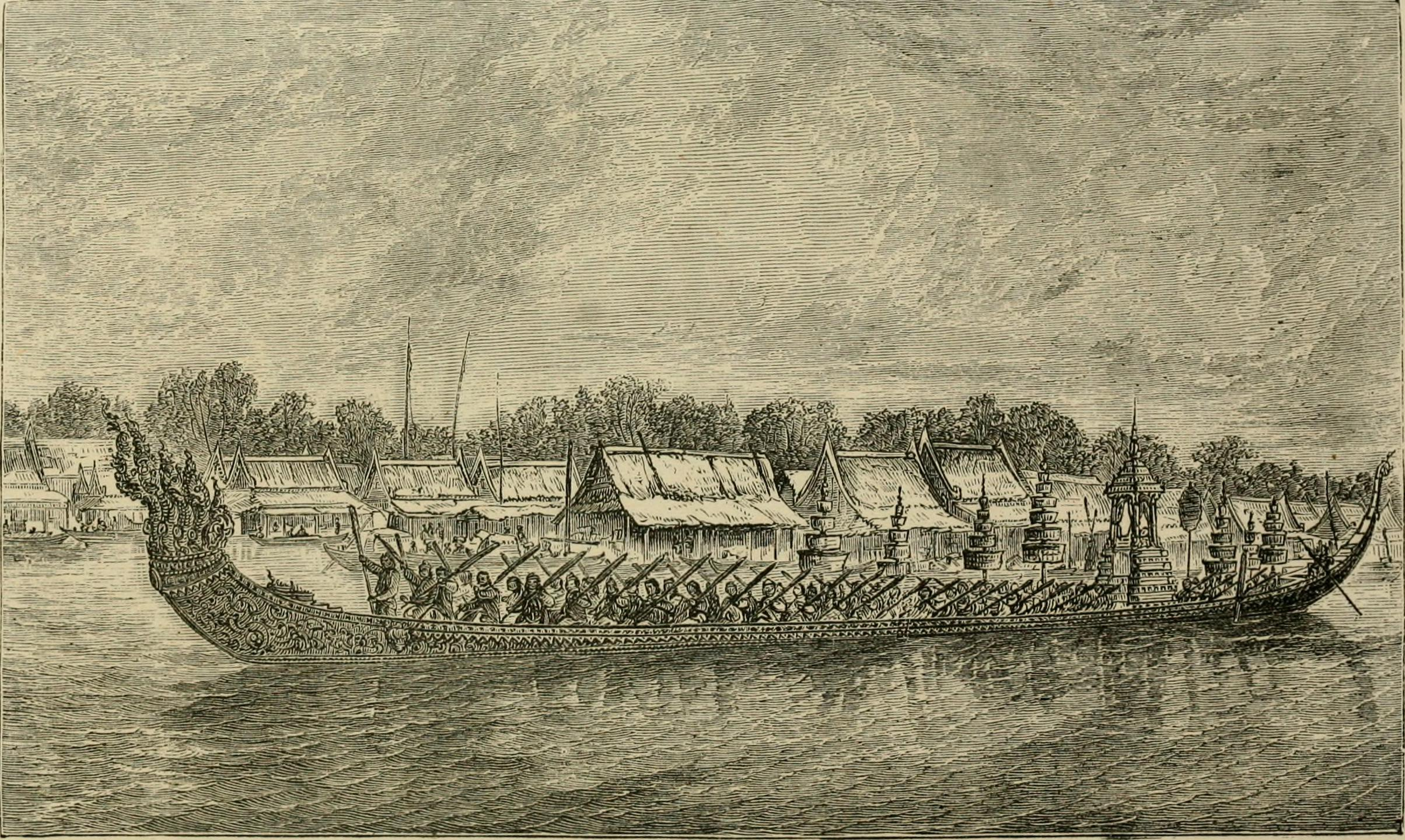
Illustration of Royal Barge Anantanakkharat, 1873.

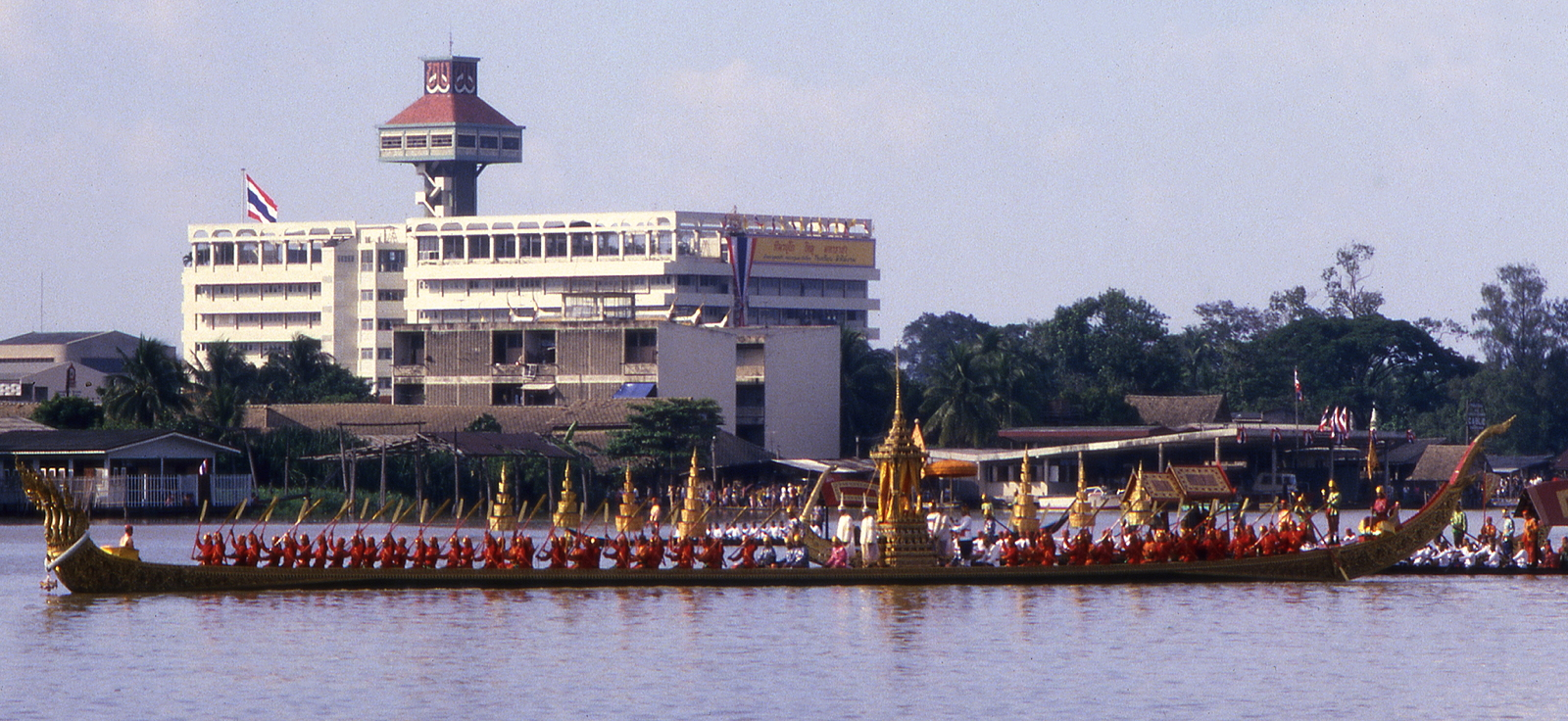
Royal Barge Anantanakkharat at the 1987 Royal Barge Procession to mark the 60th birthday of King Bhumibol Adulyadej

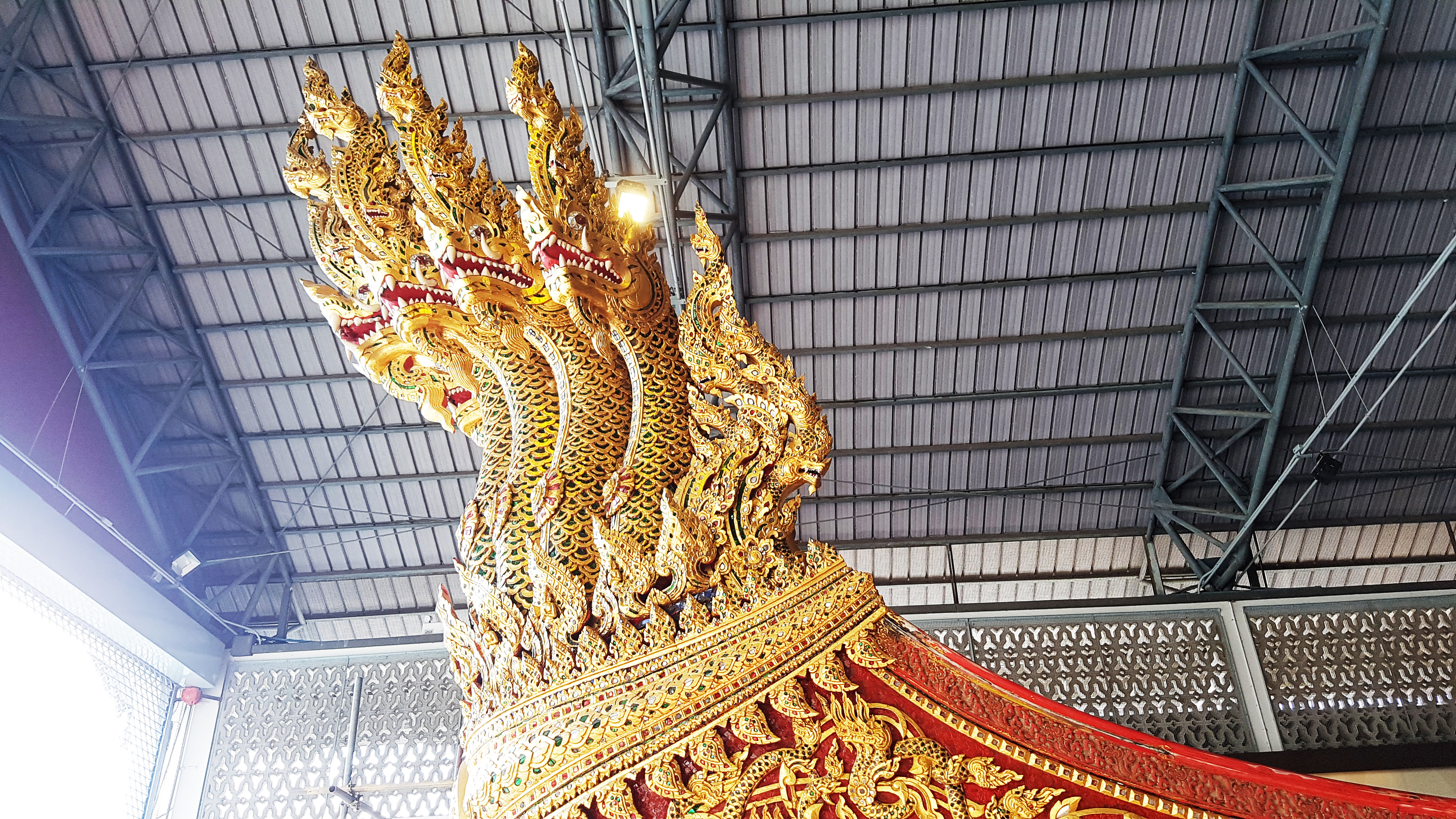
Barge's bow

The Royal Barge Anantanakkharat (Thai: เรือพระที่นั่งอนันตนาคราช), with 7-headed Nakkharat, is a royal barge in Thailand, originally created and built during the reign of Rama III (King Nangklao) in the Rattanakosin Era (Estimated 1840–1851). It is one of the four main royal barges used in the Royal Barge Procession. When it is not commissioned, it is on display at the National Museum of Royal Barges in Bangkok.

== History ==
King Rama III created the Nakkharat Barge because he already had The Garuda Barge. (Garuda is Sanskrit: गरुड garuḍa, "eagle", a large mythical bird or bird-like creature). King Rama III commissioned his brother, Prince Kromkhun Rajsrihawikrom to build the Royal Barge Anantanakkharat by crafting it from a single trunk, 40 meters long and made the bow in 7 headed Nakkharat (Nakkharat means King of Nāga (IAST: nāgá, IPA: [naːgá]) which is a Sanskrit and Pāli word for a deity or class of entity or being, taking the form of a very great snake — specifically the king cobra, found in Hinduism, Buddhism and Jainism. In Hindu regions of Asia (India, Nepal, and the island of Bali). Nāgas are considered nature spirits and the protectors of springs, wells and rivers. They bring rain, and thus fertility, but are also thought to bring disasters such as floods and drought. They are generally regarded as guardians of treasure). “Anantanakkharat” (or Ananta Shesha) is the king of the serpent deities, commonly shown with thousand heads where Vishnu, the Supreme God of Hinduism reclines and rests on, in Ksheera Sagara (the ocean of milk). King Rama III named his new 7 headed Nakkharat Barge, the “Anantanakkharat” or the greatest King of Nagas.

During the reign of Rama IV (King Mongkut), Anantanakkharat was used as his primary Royal Barge where he stayed The Royal Barge Procession for The Royal Kathin Ceremony (a presentation of Kathin robes and earns merit by honoring and supporting the Buddhist Monks), the movement of the sacred image of Buddha and for important occasions of state. Thailand's Royal Barge Procession (Thai: กระบวนพยุหยาตราชลมารค; RTGS: Krabuan Phayuhayattra Chonlamak) is a ceremony of both religious and royal significance which has been taking place for nearly 700 years. The current Anantanakkharat Royal Barge was built during the Reign of Rama VI (King Vajiravudh) and launched on 15 April 1914. The bow is carved into the 7-headed Nakkharat, the mystical snake-like creature, in gold lacquer and glass jewels. The current Anantanakkharat was built to replace the old Anantanakkharat that was damaged. It has been on duty since Rama IV's reign up to now; however, the major design of the 7-headed Nakkharat remains the same.

During the reign of King Bhumibol Adulyadej, spanning over 60 years, The Royal Barge Procession has taken place rarely, typically coinciding with only the most significant cultural and religious events. The Royal Barge Procession, at present, consists of 52 barges: 51 historical Barges, and the Royal Barge “Anantanakkharat” is one of the historic one, lying in the center of the Procession. The Procession proceeds down the Chao Phraya River, from the Wasukri Royal Landing Place in Khet Dusit, Bangkok, passes the Temple of the Emerald Buddha, the Grand Palace, Wat Pho (Thai: วัดโพธิ์), and finally arrives at Wat Arun (Thai: วัดอรุณ, Temple of the Dawn).

== Timeline ==
Monarch	Year	Main Points of Construction/ Repair
King Rama III	Estimated 1840–1851 (The end of reign)	Created, Built, whole crafted from a single trunk
King Rama IV	1851–1868 (No precise record)	Used as the primary Royal Barge for King Rama IV
King Rama VI	15 April 1914	• Built to replace the old one used since Rama IV Reign. • With green floor, Displacement 15.36 tones • Length: 42.95 m Width at Beam: 2.95 m • Hull Depth: 0.76 m Draught: 0.31 m • Crew: 54 Oarsmen, 2 Steersmen
King Rama IX	1967 Finished repair On 5 Oct 1967	Repaired for Temporal use for Royal Kathin Ceremony at Wat Arun by Sahai-Sart Co., Ltd.
	1969 26 Sep 1969 - 23 Aug 1970 9 Oct 1970-1 Mar 1972	• Full Official Repair, whole Barge • Repaired textures, design handiwork, Barge accessories
	1981 4 Sep 1981-2 Mar 1982	• Full Official Repair, whole Barge for Bangkok Bicentennial Celebrations, 2 April 1982 (2525) • Replaced the damaged wood with new ones, repaired textures, painted colors, gold lacquered
