= Jacques Helft =

French art historian and dealer (1891–1980)

- Born: February 26, 1891; Paris
- Died: January 9, 1980 (aged 88); Paris
- Occupations: Art historian and dealer

Jacques Helft (February 26, 1891 - January 9, 1980) was a French art and antiques dealer.

== Early years ==
Born Sem Jacques Helft in 1891 in Paris. His father, Léon Helft, was an antique dealer whose store A la vieille Bretagne was well known. His mother was Hortense Keller.

With his father, Léon, and brother, Yvon, Helft opened a gallery with his brother in a private mansion at 4 rue de Ponthieu (Paris 8e).

== Rosenberg and Helft ==
The art dealer Paul Rosenberg was his brother-in-law. They went into partnership to create a Rosenberg and Helft Gallery in London.

The Paris gallery was seized during the Second World War (with the complicity of the antique dealer Bonnefoy), after Jacques Helft and his family left for New York in September 1940. He escaped France along with his family thanks to the intervention of the Portuguese consul Aristides de Sousa Mendes.

From 1942 to 1948, he had his gallery on 57th Street. Later, from 1948, he moved to Argentina for several years. He returned to France in 1956 and became Honorary President of the Syndicat des Antiquaires.

He was soon led to take an interest in French silverware of the Ancien Régime, a subject that was still very little studied at the time. As little was known about the hallmarks of silverware, pieces of old French silverware were often referred to indiscriminately as objects bearing the hallmarks of the "fermiers généraux". When Jacques Helft became an expert in silverware auctions, he wrote very precise catalogs reproducing the hallmarks, a rare thing at the time. He played a major role in the organization of one of the first major exhibitions devoted to silverware, which took place in 1936 at the Museum of Decorative Arts in Paris. He later wrote several books and prefaces on this theme.

Part of his collection was dispersed in 1989 and 1996 in two auctions: La collection privée d'argenterie de Jacques et Marianne Helft, Monaco, Christies, December 3, 1989, and Objets d'art et de très bel ameublement: provenant des collections de Monsieur Jacques Helft, des collections de Madame Elisabeth S. et appartenant à divers amateurs, Paris, Hôtel George V, Jacques Tajan, April 3, 1996. Some of the most prestigious objects, which he sold to great collectors such as David David-Weill, are today in the Louvre or the Museum of Decorative Arts in Paris, to which these collectors gave them. He himself gave several works to national museums.

He had three sons from his marriage to Marianne Loevi in 1920, including the lawyer and modern art collector Georges or Jorge Helft, who settled in Argentina and Paris, and the expert Leon Helft, who died in the 1980s.

== Bibliography ==
- Jacques Helft, Exhibition of old French gold and silver plate (XVIth to XVIIIth century) in aid of French hospital, New York City, December 1933.
- Collectif, Orfèvrerie française civile de province du XVIe au XVIIIe siècle. Mars-avril 1936. Musée des arts décoratifs. Palais du Louvre. Pavillon de Marsan., 1936 (Avant-propos de Jacques Helft)
- Jacques Helft, Vive la chine! Mémoires d'un antiquaire, Éditions du Rocher, 1955 (trad. en anglais : Treasure hunt. Memoirs of an antique dealer, Faber, 1957)
- Pour s’y connaitre mieux en tasses à vin, in Connaissance des arts, n°124 de juin 1962, p. 60 à 65
- Claude Frégnac, Les grands orfèvres de Louis XIII à Charles X, Hachette, 1965 (préface de Jacques Helft)
- Jacques Helft, Le Poinçon des provinces françaises, F. de Nobele, 1968
- Jacques Helft, Nouveaux poinçons : suivis de recherches techniques et historiques sur l'orfèvrerie sous l'Ancien régime, Berger-Levrault, 1980
