= National Museum of Royal Barges =

Museum in Bangkok, Thailand

Coordinates: 13°45′42″N 100°29′3.9″E

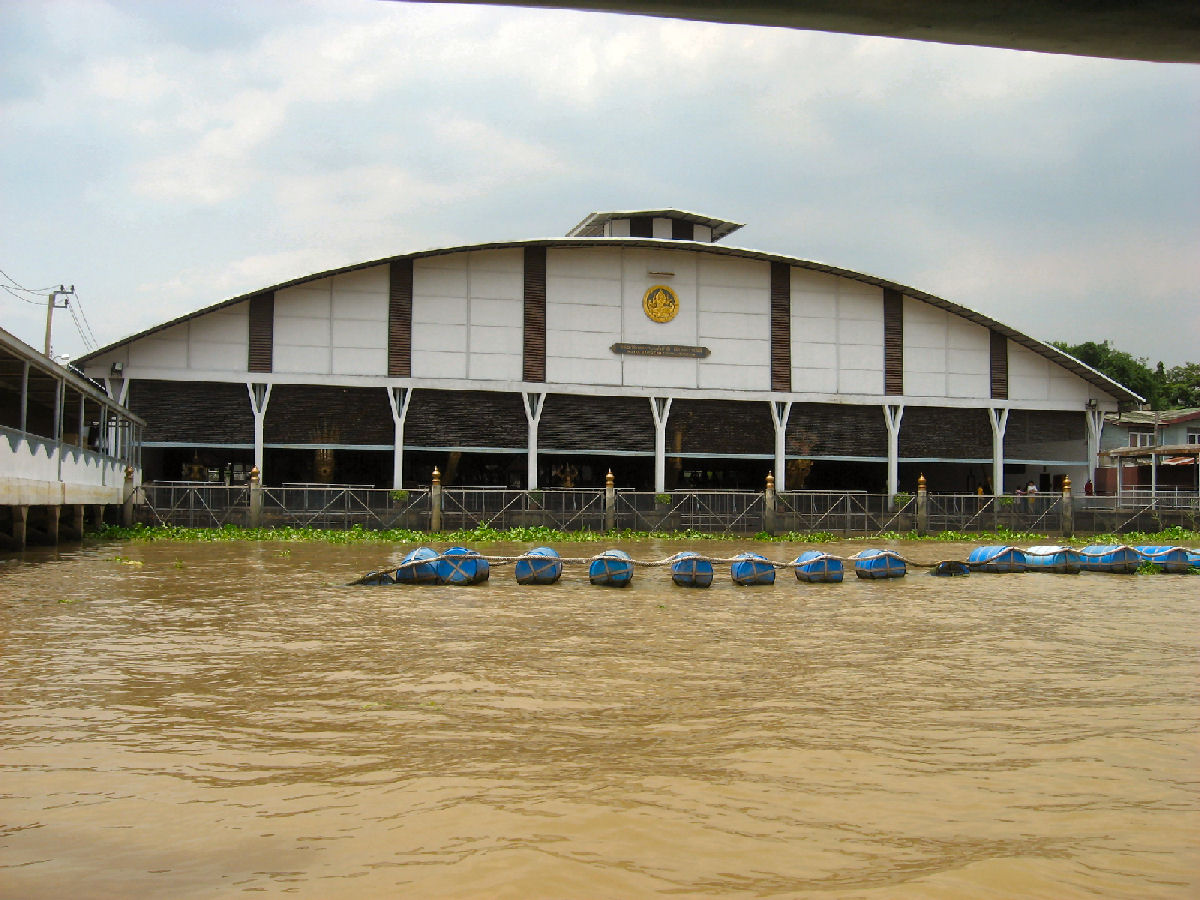
National Museum of Royal Barges

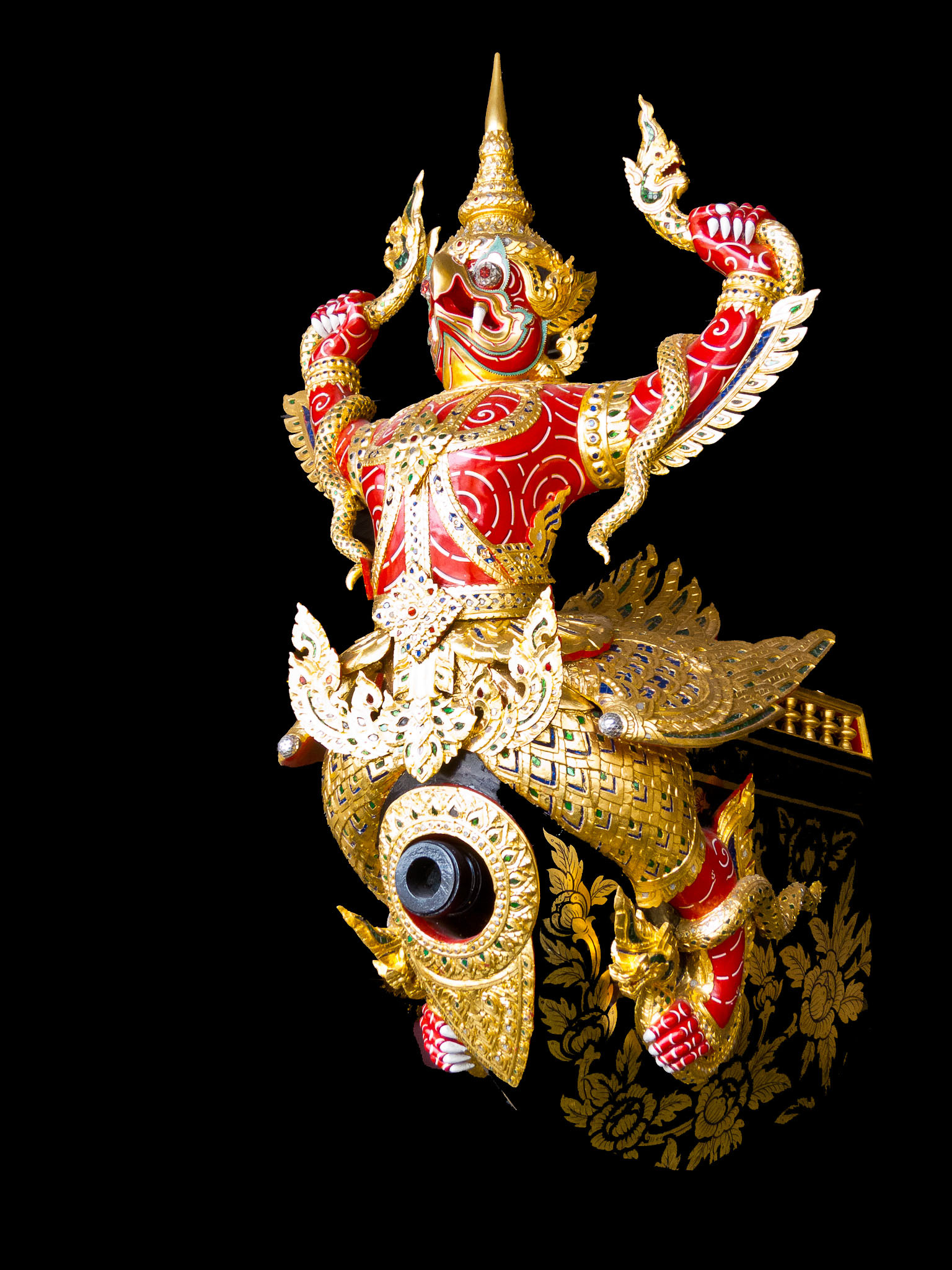
Figurehead on one of the Royal Barges

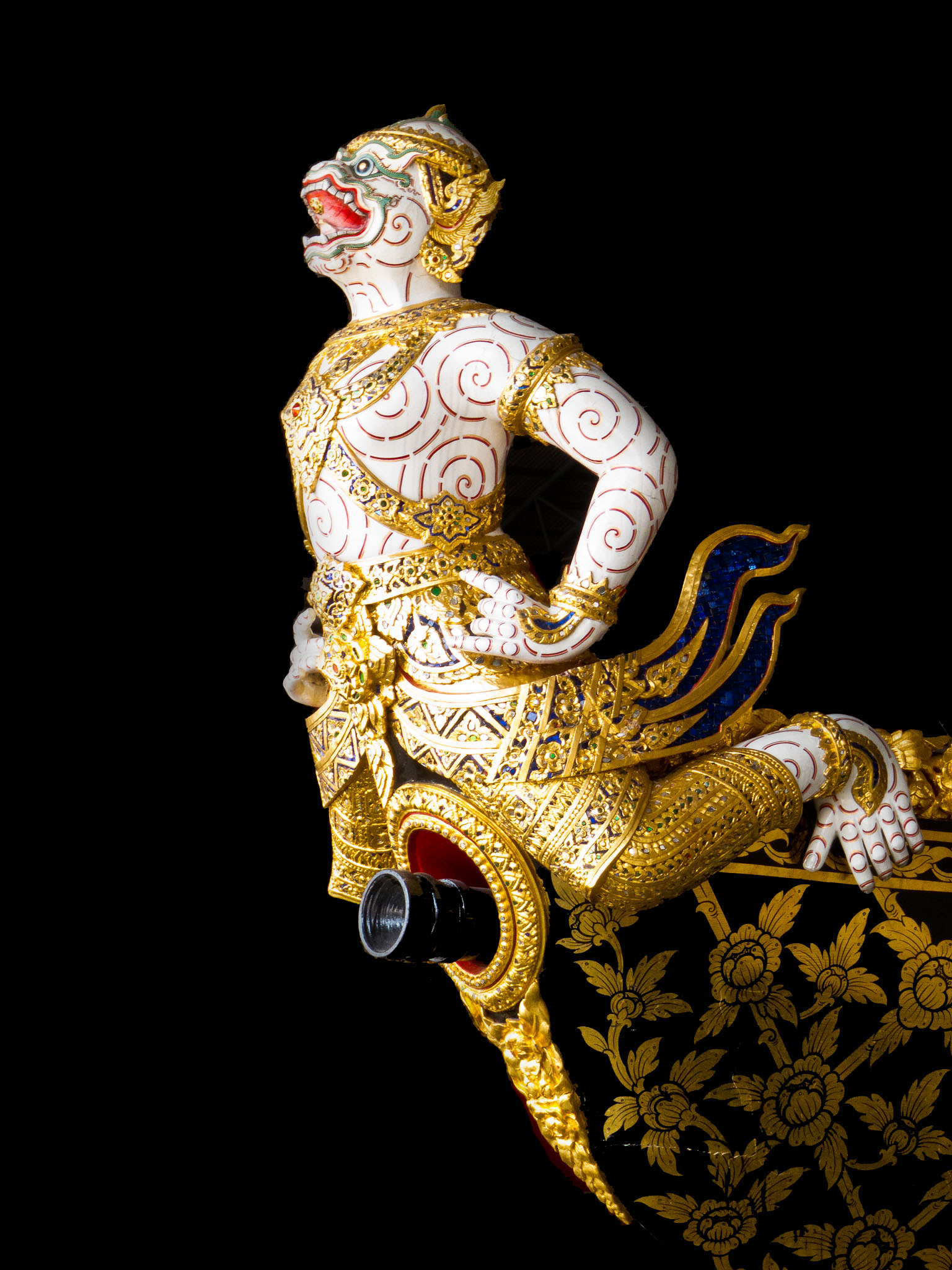
Figurehead on one of the Royal Barges

The National Museum of Royal Barges is a museum in Bangkok, Thailand. It is on the northern rim of Bangkok Noi canal in the Bangkok Noi District.

Royal barges from the Royal Barge Procession are kept at the museum.

The museum was formerly a dry dock for barges and warships under the care of the Bureau of the Royal Household and the Royal Thai Navy. The dock and barges sustained severe bombing damage during World War II, but in 1949 they were restored by the Fine Arts Department as part of the Thai cultural heritage. Repairs were completed and the dock became the National Museum of Royal Barges in 1972.

== Exhibition ==
1. Boat and Barge:

There are 8 of 52 important royal barges displayed in this museum

1. Royal Barge Suphannahong	
Appearance	Gold, royal swan-shaped prow decorated with glass ornaments.
Dimensions	Length 46.15 meters; Width 3.17 meters; Hull depth 94 cm (37 in), draught of 41 cm
Power	Driving power of 3.5 meters per stroke
Crew	50 oarsmen, 2 steersmen, 2 officers fore and aft, 1 standard bearer, 1 signalman, 1 chanter, 7 royal regalia bearers.

2. Royal Barge Narai Song Suban HM Rama IX	
Appearance	The figurehead of Vishnu god mounted on a garuda holding on Naga (the legendary creature, appearance as great snake). Porthole for cannon beneath the Garuda. Decorated with golden lacquer and glass ornaments
Dimensions	Length 44.30 meters; Width 3.20 meters at the beam; Hull depth 1.10 cm
Crew	50 oarsmen, 2 steersmen

3. Royal Barge Anekkachatpuchong	
Appearance	Carved and gilded in pattern of small nagas. The hull is painted pink outside and red inside.
Dimensions	Length 45.67 meters; Width 2.91 meters; Hull depth 91 cm
Power	Driving power of 3.5 meters per stroke.
Crew	60 oarsmen, 2 steersmen

4. Royal Barge Anantanakkharat	
Appearance	Seven-headed nagas shape prow. Decorated with golden lacquer and glass ornaments. The hull is green outside and red inside.
Dimensions	Length 44.85 meters; Width 3.17 meters at the beam; Hull depth 94 cm
Power	Driving power of 3.02 meters per stroke
Crew	54 oarsmen, 2 steersmen

5. Ekachai Hern How Barge	
Appearance	The figurehead of Hera ( Naga-headed Dragons) decorated with golden lacquer.
Dimensions	Length 29.76 meters; Width 2.06 meters at the beam; Hull depth 60 cm
Power	Driving power of 3 meters per stroke
Crew	38 oarsmen, 2 steersmen

6. Krabi Prab Muang Marn Barge	
Appearance	The figurehead of uncrowned monkey warrior with white body of Hanuman. Decorated with golden lacquer and glass.
Dimension	Length 28.85 meters; Width 2.10 meters at the beam; Hull depth 56 cm
Power	Driving power of 2.6 meters per stroke
Crew	36 oarsmen, 2 steersmen

7. Asura Vayuphak Barge	
Appearance	The Figurehead of an ogre-faced bird. Face, hands and feet are indigo, the front is purple, and the back is green. The hull is black outside.
Dimensions	Length 31 meters; Width 2.03 meters at the beam; Hull depth 62 cm
Power	Driving power of 2.6 meters per stroke
Crew	30 oarsmen, 2 steersmen

8.Krut Hern Het Barge	
Appearance	The prow features a garuda clutching a naga. The hull is red inside and black with floral designs in gold on the outside.
Dimensions	Length 28.58 meters; Width 2.10 meters at the beam; Hull depth 60 cm
Power	Driving power of 2.6 meters per stroke
Crew	34 oarsmen, 2 steersmen

2. History

2.1 Evidence of Royal Barge and royal Barge Procession 2.2 Battle formations 2.3 Ceremonial Processions

3. Bangkok Period Royal Barge Heritage 3.1 Building process 3.2 Description of the figureheads 3.3 The royal barge procession 3.4 Relevance to Thai art history

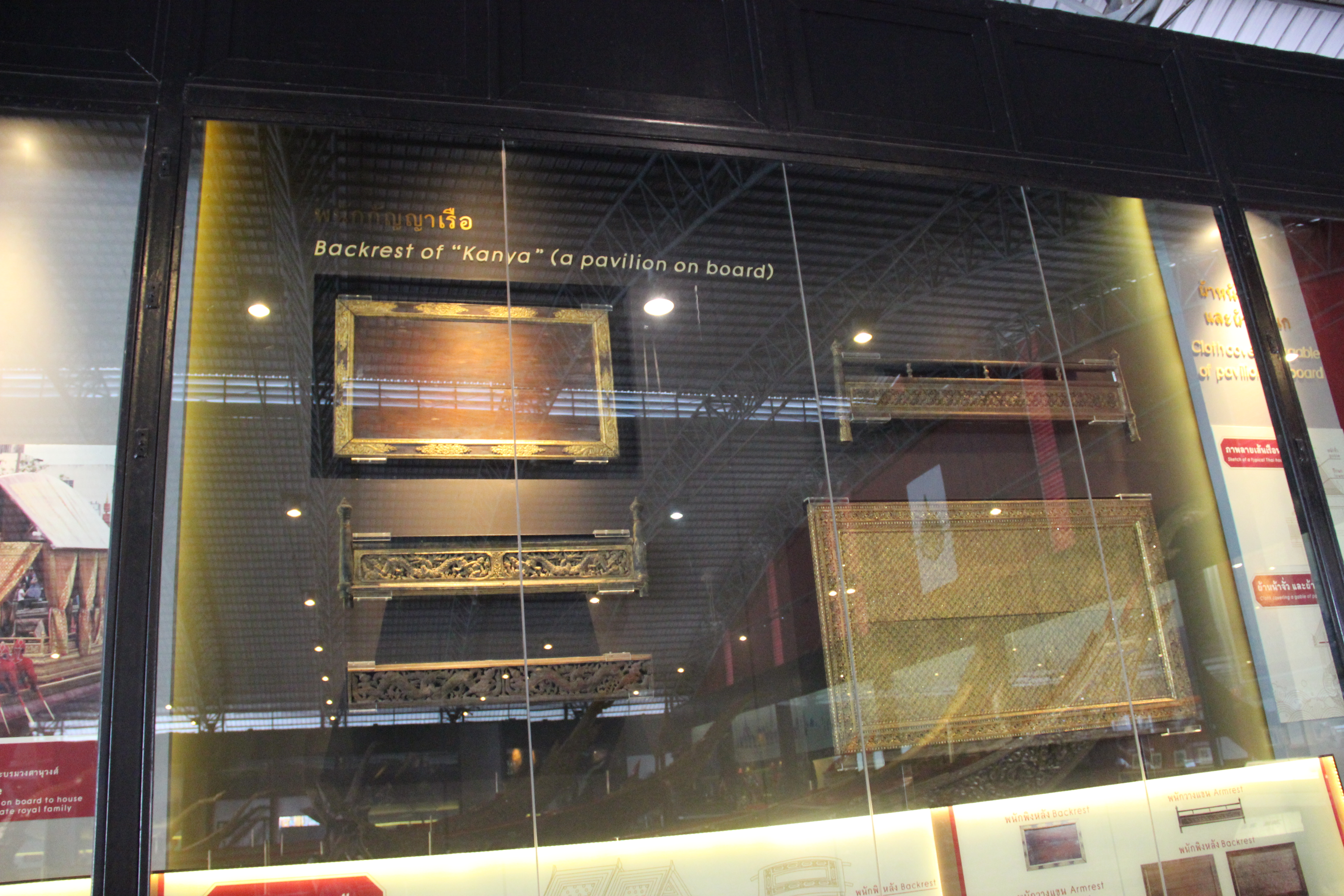
Backrest of a Pavilion on board (Kanya)

4. Royal Barge Narai Song Suban – Rama IX 4.1 Detail of Royal Barge Narai Song Suban 4.2 Building detail 4.3 Royal ceremonies 4.4 Initiation of the procession

5. Royal Barge Procession Chants 5.1 The percussion instruments 5.2 Meaning of the song

6. Royal Barge Suphannahong and the World Ship Prize. 6.1 Full history of the Royal barge Suphannahong 6.2 Art and craftsmanship 6.3 Award

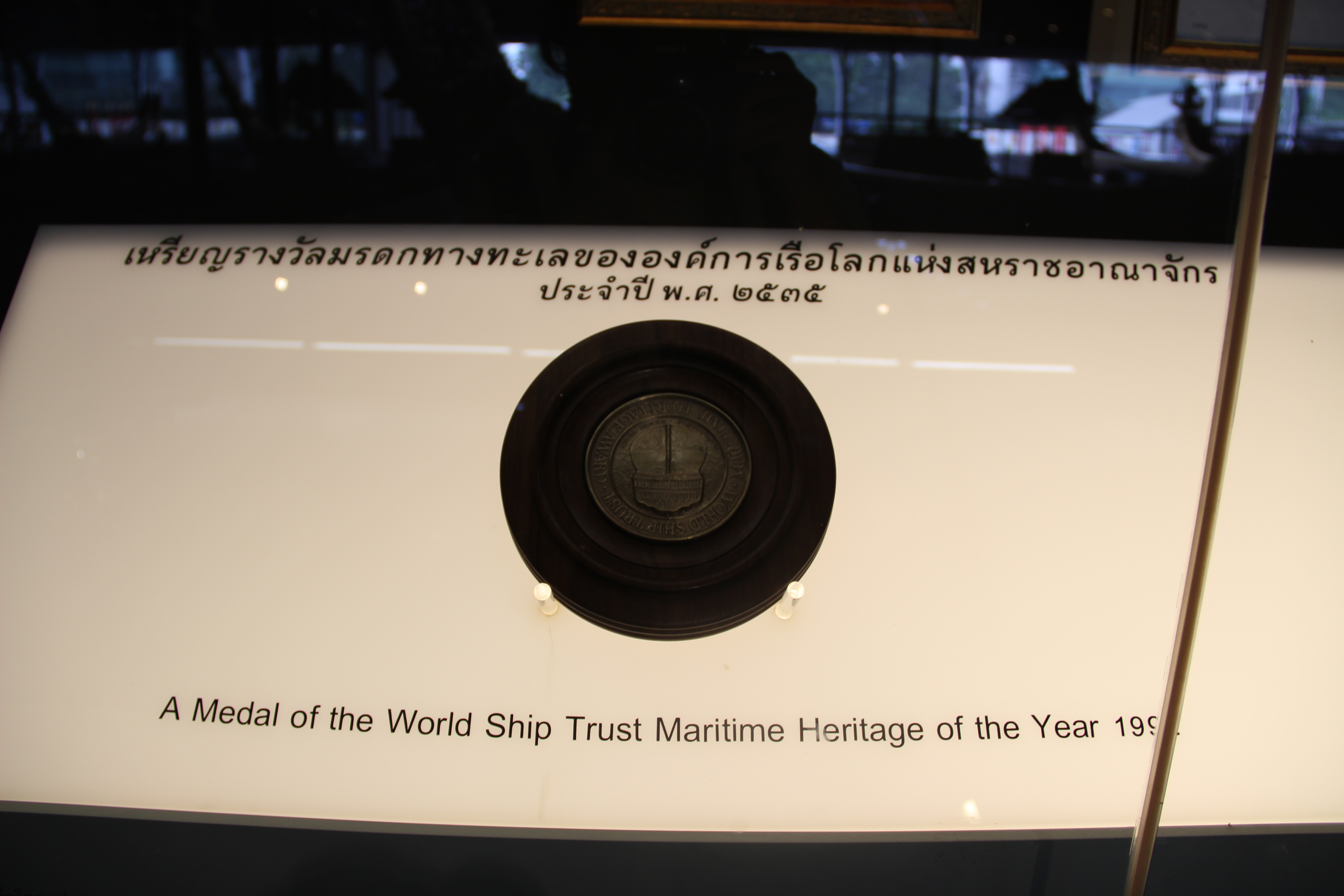
A Medal of the World Ship Trust Maritime Heritage

== See also ==
- Royal Barge Procession
