= Royal Barge Narai Song Suban HM Rama IX =

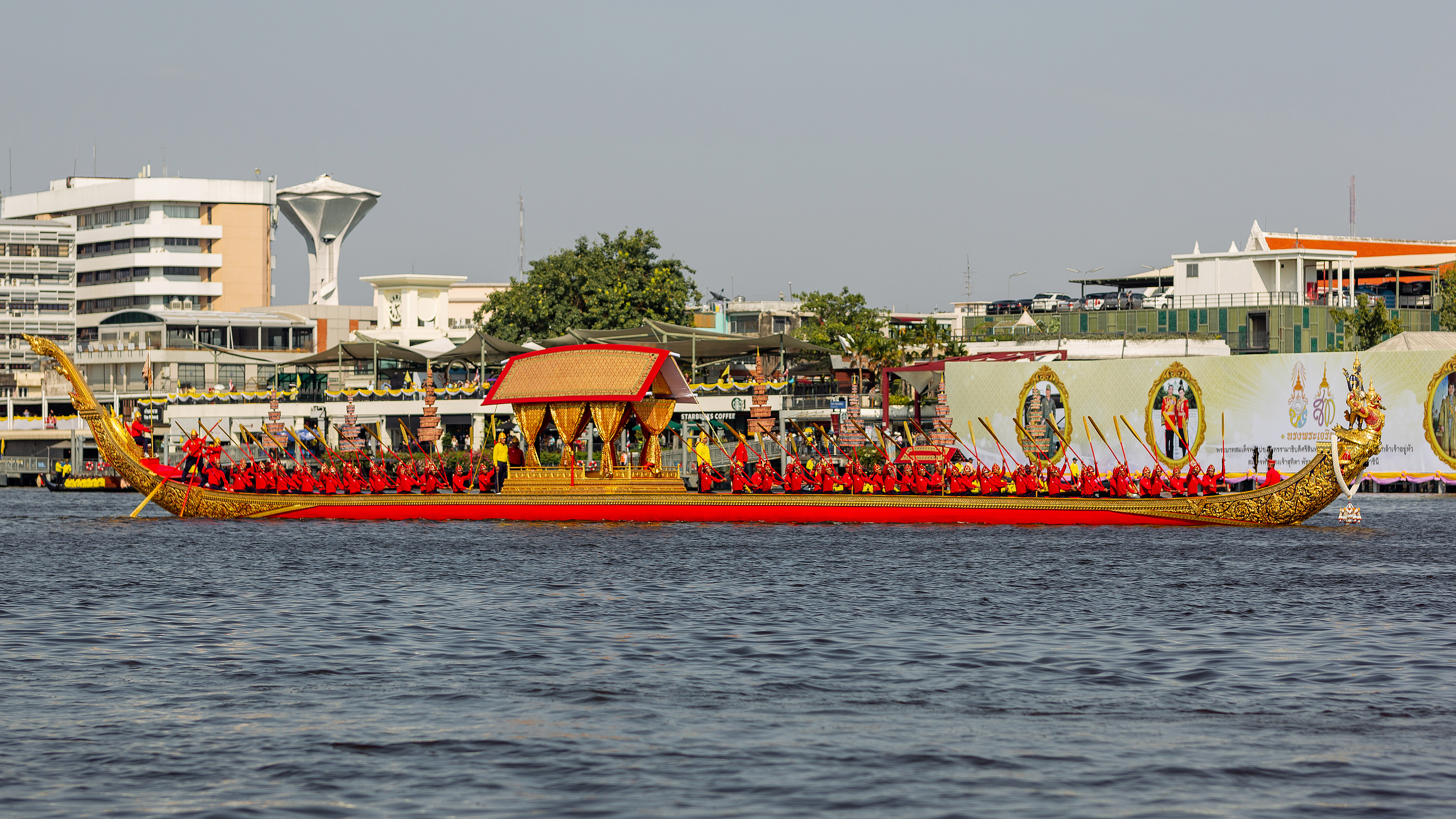

History

Thailand
- Name: Narai Song Suban HM Rama IX
- Namesake: Narayana on Garuda
- Owner: Bureau of the Royal Household
- Operator: Royal Thai Navy

General characteristics
- Type: Royal barge
- Displacement: 20 tons
- Length: 44.3 m
- Beam: 3.2 m
- Draught: 0.4 m
- Depth: 1.1 m
- Crew: 64

The Royal Barge Narai Song Suban HM Rama IX (Thai: เรือพระที่นั่งนารายณ์ทรงสุบรรณ รัชกาลที่ 9,RTGS: Ruea Phra Thi Nang Narai Song Suban Ratchakan Thi Kao) is a royal barge in Thailand that is one of the four main barges used in the Royal Barge Procession. When it is not commissioned, it is on display at the National Museum of Royal Barges in Bangkok.

== History ==
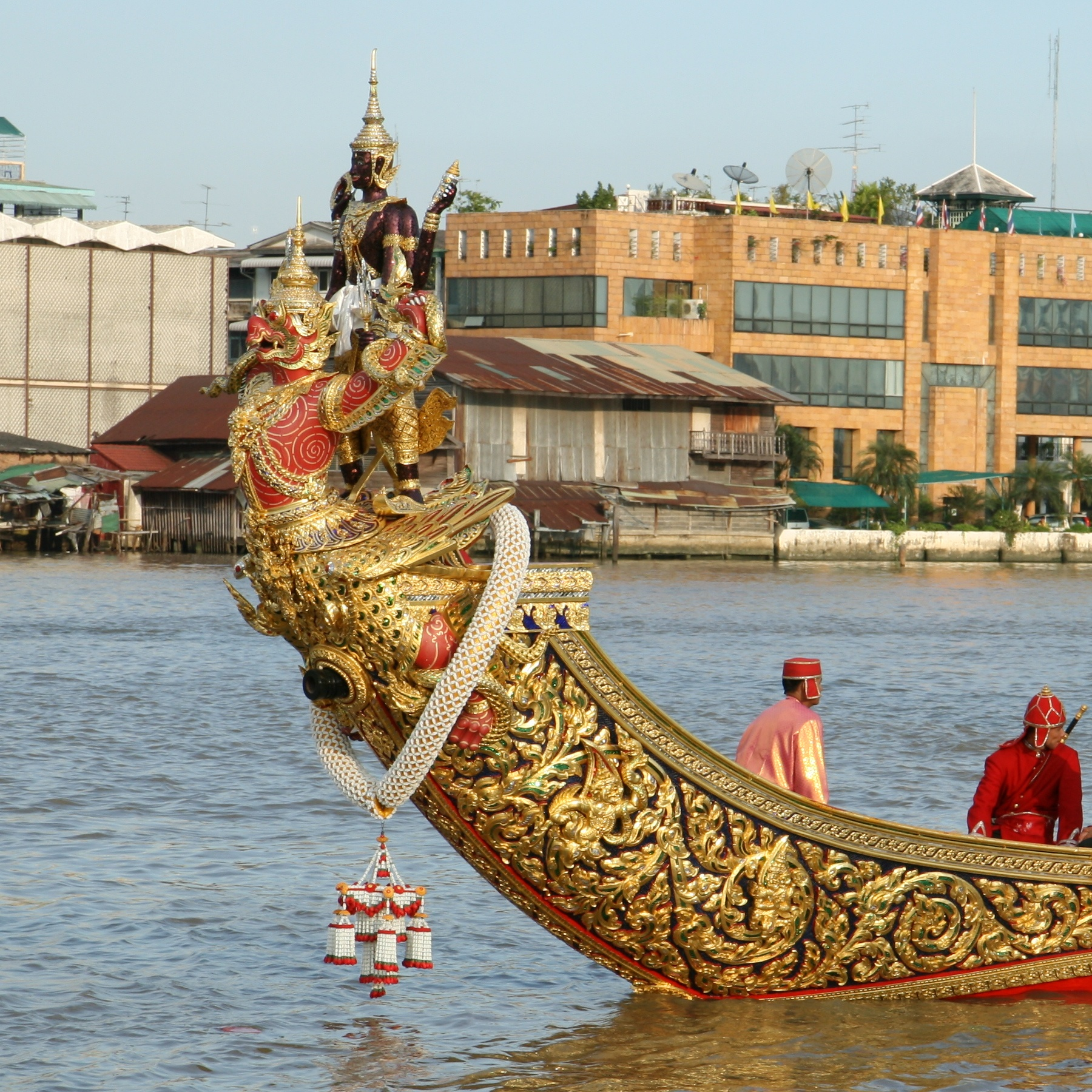
Barge's bow

The royal barge was first mentioned during the reign of King Rama III, which was then named "Mongkhon Suban", and had its bow carved into the shape of a Garuda, with a round opening for a cannon. The boat was measured at a length of 17 wa 3 sok (approximately 37.5 m). King Rama IV then added a statue of the God Narayana above the Garuda and was decorated according to Brahmin tradition. Over time the condition of the barge gradually deteriorated and only the original ship's bow was preserved in the Bangkok National Museum.

In 1994, Siam Commercial Bank PCL, along with the Royal Thai Naval Dockyard, Royal Thai Navy and the Fine Arts Department, requested royal permission from King Rama IX for the construction of the "Narai Song Suban" barge for the King's Golden Jubilee on 9 June 1996, which was permitted and the barge was renamed "Narai Song Suban HM King Rama IX" in commemoration of the King. Construction began on 1 June 1994 and was launched on 5 April 1996 by Crown Prince Vajiralongkorn at a cost of 11.7 million baht.

Out of the procession fleet, the Royal Barge Narai Song Suban is the newest royal barge.
