= Royal Barge Anekkachatphuchong =

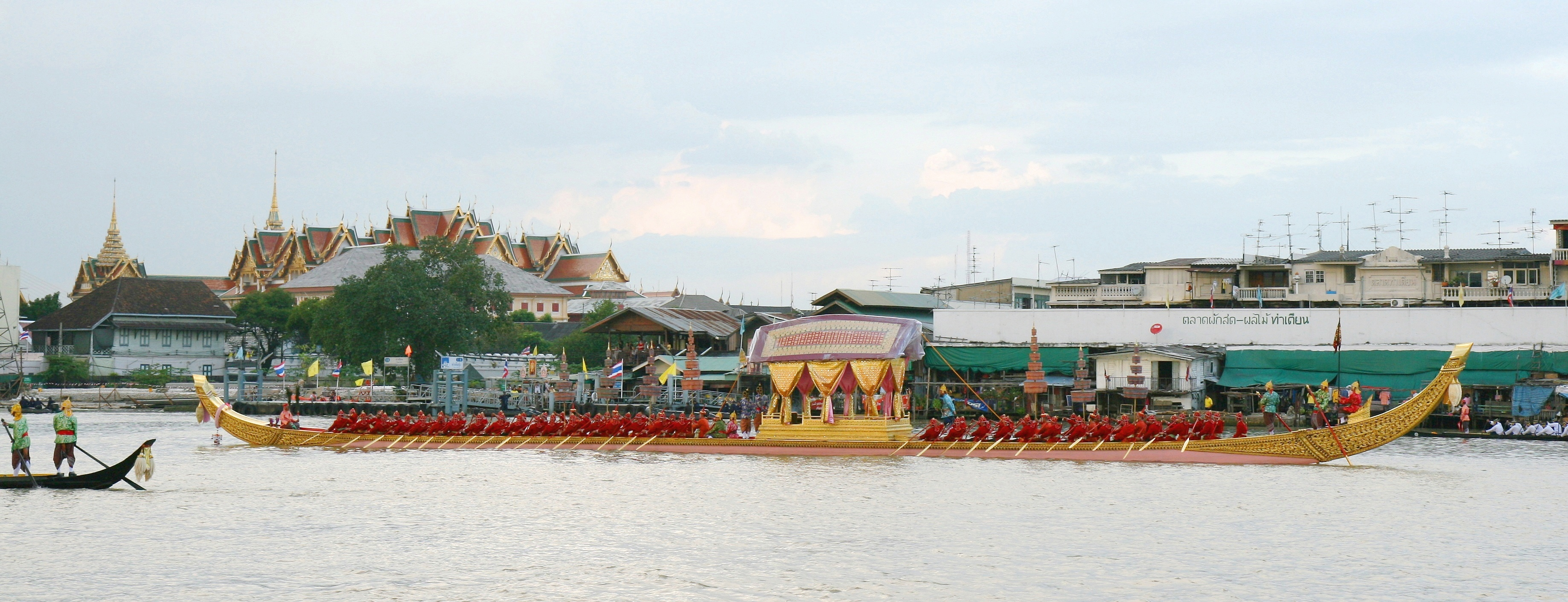

History

Thailand
- Name: Anekkachatphuchong
- Namesake: Naga
- Owner: Bureau of the Royal Household
- Operator: Royal Thai Navy

General characteristics
- Type: Royal barge
- Displacement: 15 tons
- Length: 45.5 m
- Beam: 3.15 m
- Draught: 0.46 m
- Depth: 1.11 m
- Crew: 75

The Royal Barge Anekkachatphuchong (Thai: เรือพระที่นั่งอเนกชาติภุชงค์) is a royal barge in Thailand that is one of the four main barges used in the Royal Barge Procession. When it is not commissioned, it is on display at the National Museum of Royal Barges in Bangkok.

== Barge details ==
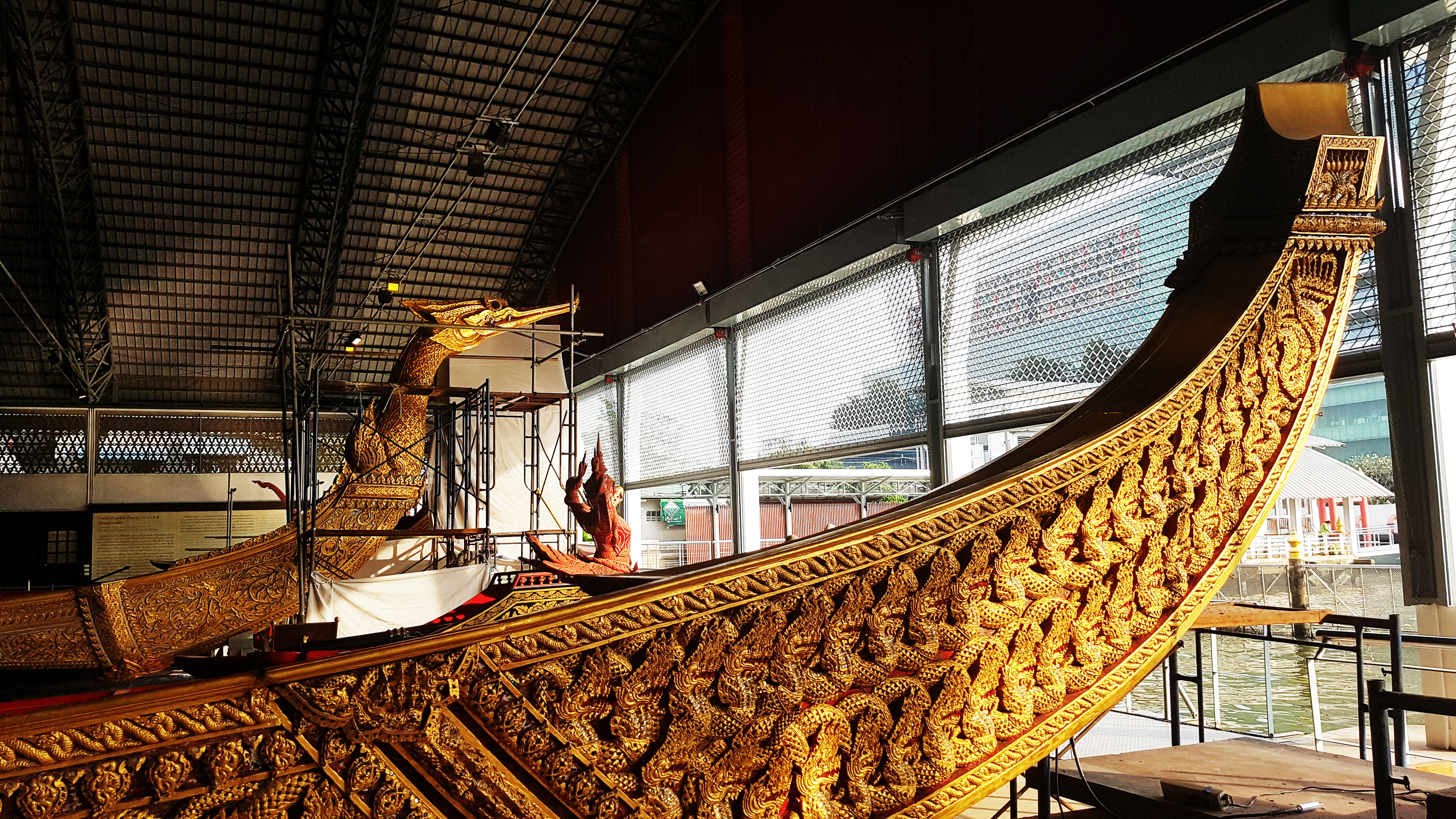
Barge's bow decorated with many carved serpents

The Royal Barge Anekkachatphuchong was constructed during the reign of King Rama IV and was completed during the reign of King Rama V, making it the oldest royal barge of the procession fleet. The name Anekkachatpuchong is adapted from Sanskrit: Anegachatapuchongka, meaning many types of serpents.

Out of the four royal barges, Anekkachatphuchong is the only royal barge without a bow carved into a mythical creature. However, numerous small ornamental Nāga figures are carved into the bow, reflecting its namesake. The hull of Anekkachatphuchong is painted pink on the outside and red on the inside.
