= Royal Barge Procession =

Thai religious and royal ceremony

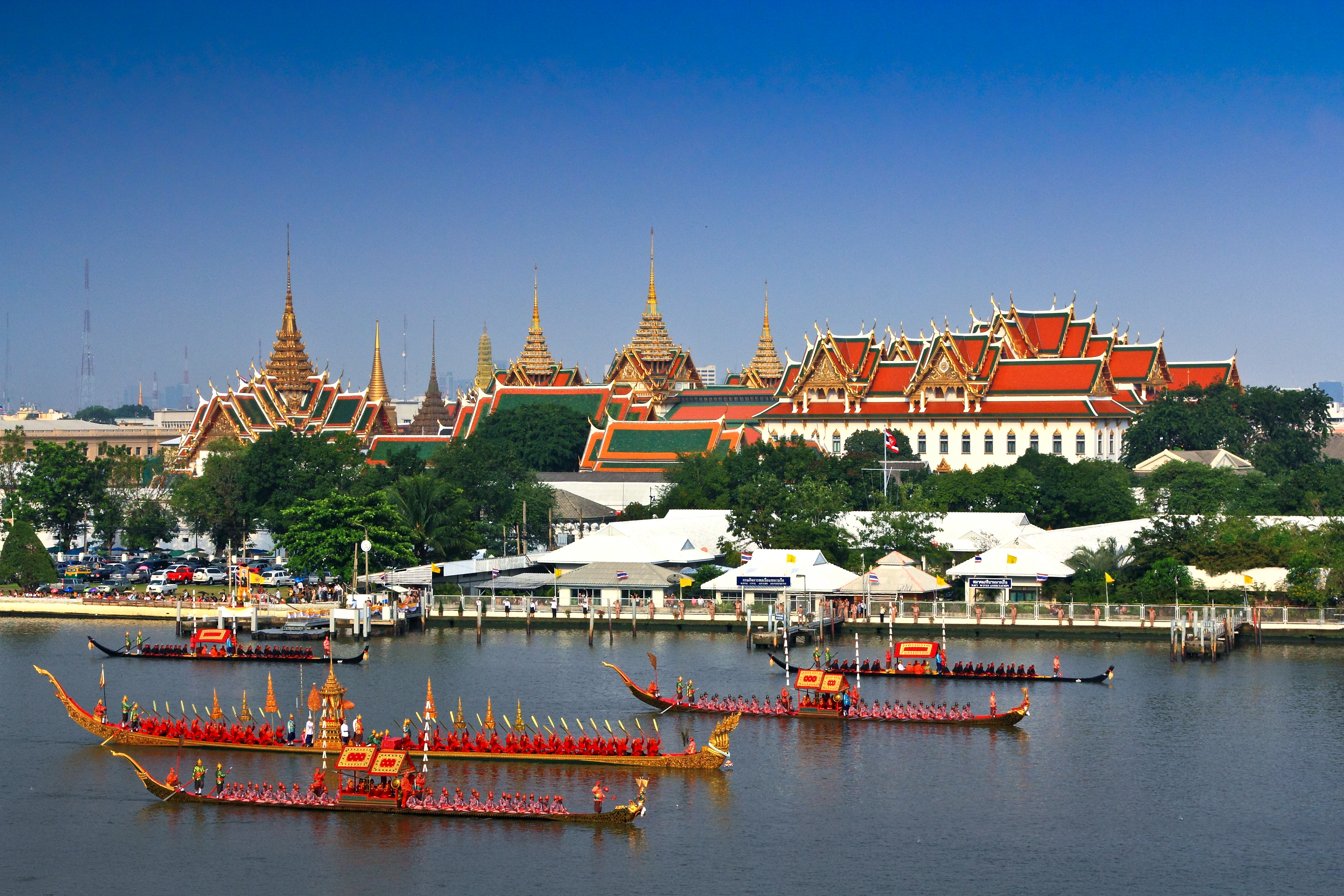
Royal Barge Anantanakkharat (2nd-nearest), flanked by escort barges Phali Rang Thawip (nearest) and Sukhrip Khrong Mueang (3rd), as the procession passes by the Grand Palace during dress rehearsals in 2012

Thailand's Royal Barge Procession (Thai: กระบวนพยุหยาตราชลมารค; RTGS: krabuan phayuhayattra chonlamak) is a ceremony of both religious and royal significance which has taken place for nearly 700 years. The royal barges are a blend of craftsmanship and traditional Thai art. The Royal Barge Procession takes place rarely, marking only the most significant cultural and religious events. During the long reign of King Bhumibol Adulyadej, spanning over 70 years, the procession only occurred 16 times.

The Royal Barge Procession, in the present, consists of 52 barges: 51 historical barges, and the Royal Barge, the Narai Song Suban, which King Rama IX built in 1994. It is the only barge built during King Bhumibol's reign. These barges are manned by 2,082 oarsmen. The procession proceeds down the Chao Phraya River, from the Wasukri Royal Landing Place in Dusit district, Bangkok, passes the Temple of the Emerald Buddha, the Grand Palace, Wat Pho, and finally arrives at Wat Arun.

== History ==
Thailand's Royal Barge Procession can be dated back to the Sukhothai Kingdom from the 13–14th centuries (1238–1438 AD). However, further examination of the Thai chronicle, Phraratchaphongsawadan Nuea, found that it could be traced back to the 11th century.

=== Pre-Ayutthaya era (Ayodhya period) ===
In the 11th century, the Thai chronicle, Phraratchaphongsawadan Nuea (Royal Chronicle of the North), recorded the royal barge procession of Prince Sai Nam Peung, a pre-Ayudhya king of Siam who had set the barge and landed at the cape of Wat Pak Klong temple. Later he ascended to the governor seat with the regnal name, Phra Chao Sai Nam Pung (Thai: พระเจ้าสายน้ำผึ้ง, romanized: King Sai Nam Pheung, lit. 'King Honey-flow'), and ruled the Ayodhya region from 1165–1205.

=== Sukhothai era ===
In the reign of King Ram Khamhaeng the royal barge procession was performed at Loy Krathong ceremony.

The Ram Khamhaeng Inscription (RK) 1292 AD reads:–

after which he watched and listened to people, men and women, sing and play... Whenever the royal barge alighted in front of a monastery, officials lighted fireworks. (NN:67).

In the reign of King Maha Thammaracha I, the King of Sukhothai performed a royal barge ceremony using a boat on the lake in the middle of his grand palace.

=== Ayutthaya era ===
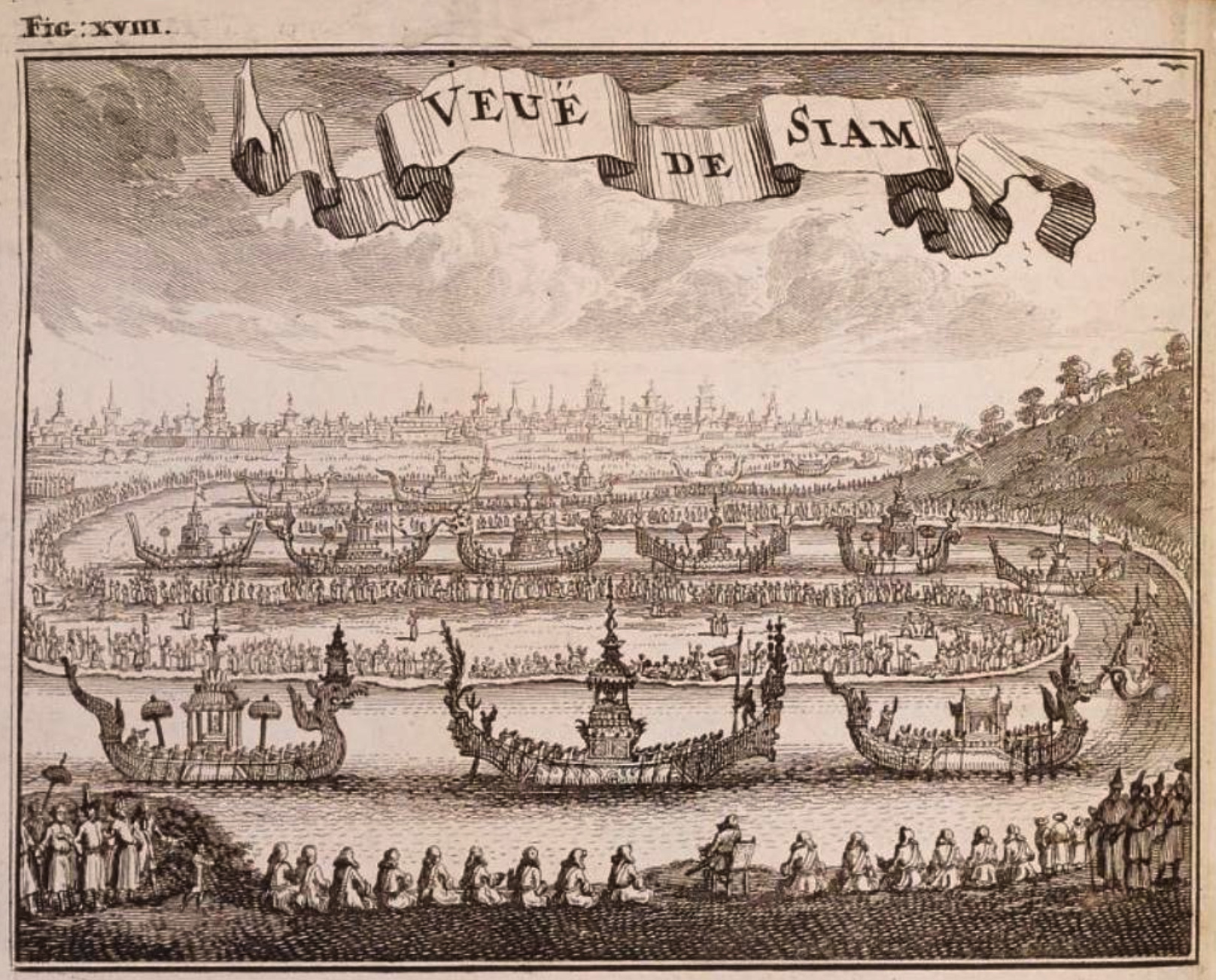
Views of Ayutthaya (VEUË DE SIAM) and Royal Barge Procession by Henri Abraham Châtelain. First published in Amsterdam, Chatelain's Atlas Historique (1719) from Guy Tachard's Voyage de Siam (1686), reign of King Narai.

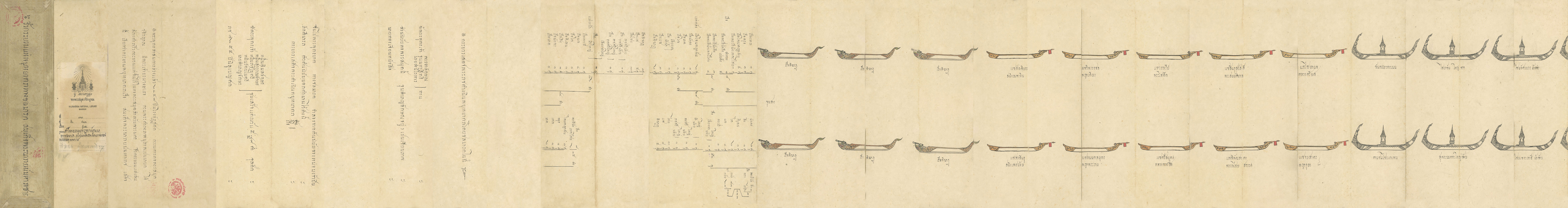
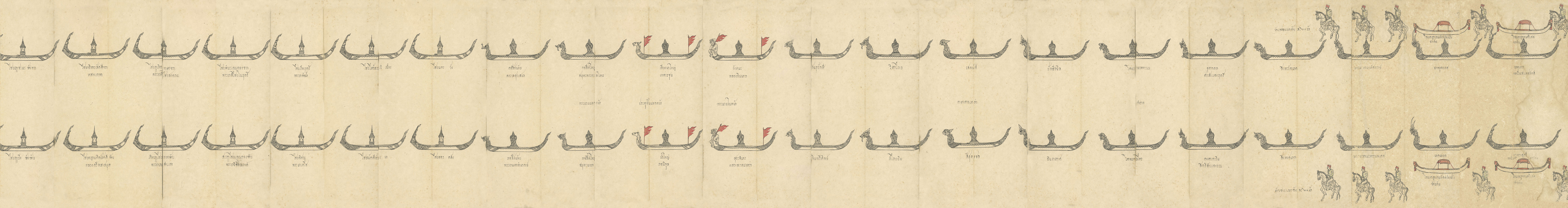
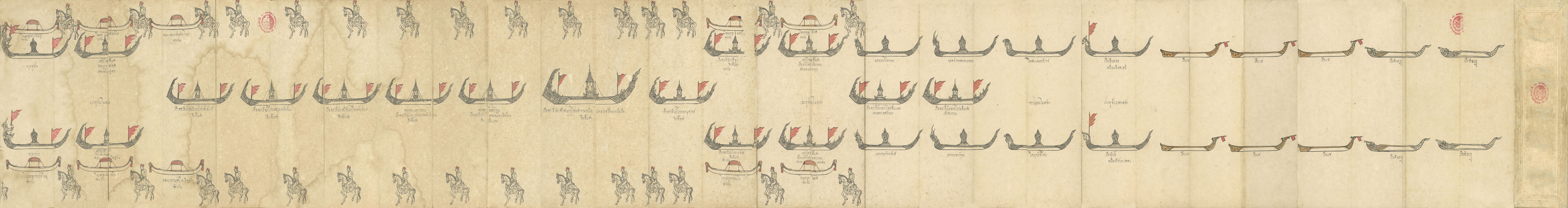
Royal Barge Procession of Ayutthaya Scroll

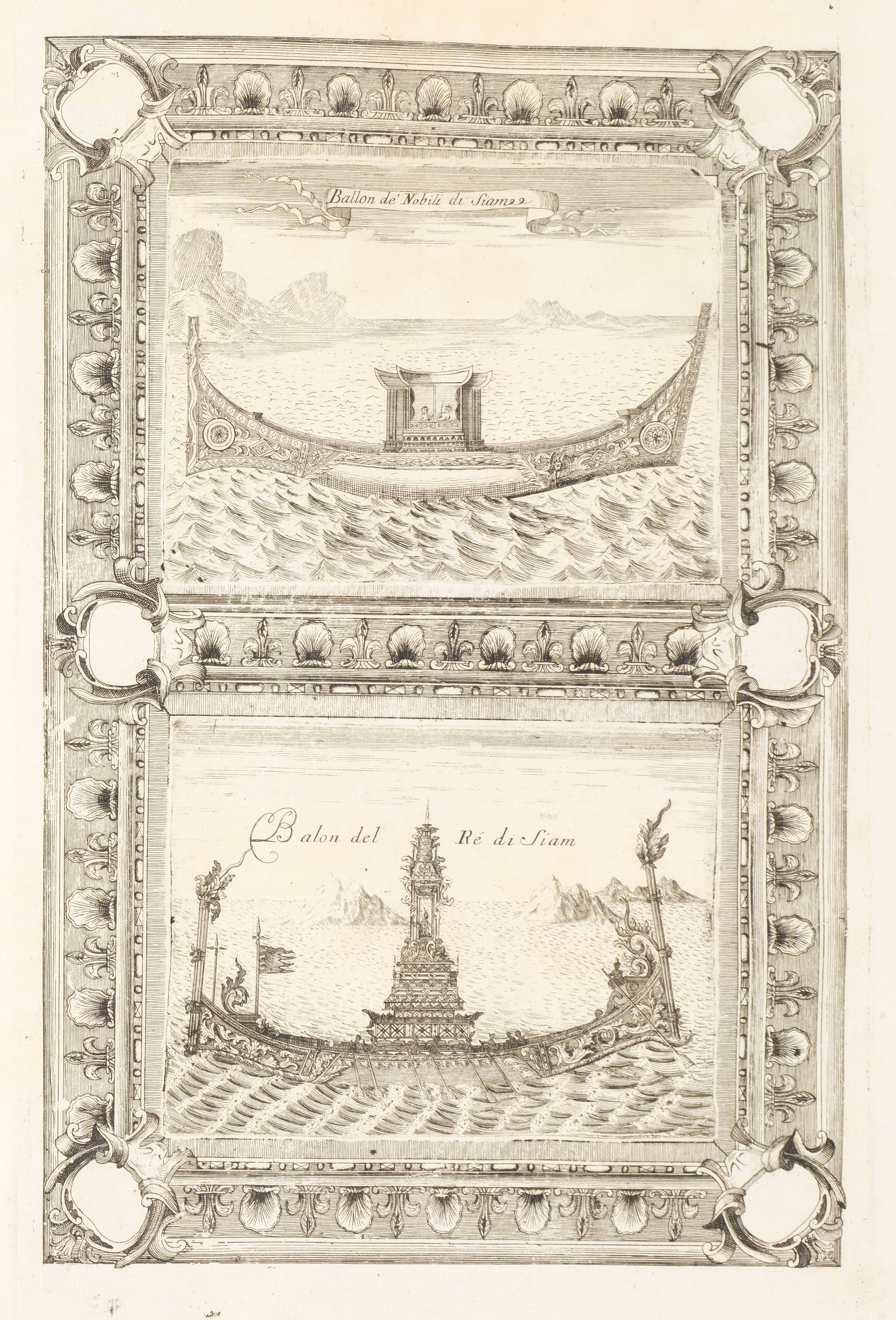
Royal Barge Procession in Atlante Veneto, a comprehensive atlas published by the Franciscan geographer Vincenzo Maria Coronelli, Volume 1 between 1691 and 1692 in the reign of King Phetracha of Ayutthaya era.

Since Ayutthaya Kingdom in the 14th century, strategic waterways and water transportation became more important to the Siamese people, according to the Safine-ye Solaymani mentioned variant of Shahr-i Nāv or Shahr-i Nau (Persian: شهر نو), literally "City of Boats, Canals" with reference to Ayutthaya Kingdom. The traditional plays and competitions, i.e. the Siamese long boat racing festival described in the Royal Ceremonies of the Twelve Months, were celebrated at peace, and the grand parade of the royal fleet rushed out to confront the enemies at war.

In 1582, according to Marcelo de Ribadeneira’s archive, History of the Islands of the Philippine Archipelago and the Kingdoms of Great China, Tartary, Cochinchina, Malacca, Siam, Cambodia, and Japan (1601), the Franciscan missionary friar recorded the testimony of a Franciscan friar who came to reside in Siam in 1582. The Ribadeneira’s archive described the royal barge procession of King Maha Thammarachathirat in Spanish:–

Y para repreſentar la mageſtad de la venida del rey, venieron delante del quatro barcos grandes, en que venían muchos hombres, tañendo unas trompetas de plata pequeñas. Los barcos eran pintados y labrados de muchas y diuerſas labores, y figuras. De manera, que confiderada la popa, y la proa, qeſtaua muy doradas, en ſu modo y hehcura parecía un Elphante. Eſtos barcos pararon junto a un templo que eſtaua a la orilla del río, de la otra parte de la ciudad, adonde ſe dezía que hauia de parar el Rey, y hazer oración y limofna. Deſpués de los barcos de las trompetas, vinieron otros largos y differentes de los primeros, con mucha gente, veſtida de varias libreas. Y en cada vno venía un grande del Reyno, por ſu orden, ſegún ſus oficios y dignidades, repreſentando con ſus trajes y acompañamiento, la majeſtad y grandeza de ſu rey. Los aderezos de los barcos, que eran muchos, y de la gente innumerable era de mucha coſta y gala, y todos pararon junto al templo.

(Translation): In honor of the arrival of the King of Siam, four large royal barges were moored in front of His Majesty. Many people blew small silver trumpets. The royal barges of the King of Siam were painted and carved with many works and statues. When the stern and bow were opened, they became a beautiful golden color. Both the shape and the craftsmanship looked like elephants. These royal barges moored beside a temple on the other side of the river. It is said that the King of Siam would moor his royal barges to pray and ask for worship. The next royal barges of trumpet barges had other long barges different from the first one. Many people wore clothes decorated with various patterns. Each of the great members of the royal family of Siam walked in order according to their positions and ranks. They dressed and walked in the procession with their barges, showing the majesty and greatness of their king. There were countless Siamese nobles. On the royal barges were many things, all very expensive and luxurious. And everyone stopped beside the temple.

— Marcelo de Ribadeneira, From the Kingdom of Siam (Del Reino de Sian), 1601.

In 1594–98, King Naresuan performed the royal barge procession before leading his 120,000 battalions to attack the Burmese Hanthawaddy kingdom. When the moment was auspicious, the royal astrologer then ordered vassals to beat the drum for the oarsmen and sailed the royal barge Sri Suphannahong ahead, on which the barge installed a golden Gautama Buddha containing the holy relics of the Lord Buddha, Phra Phichai, to lead the procession for good fortune. King Naresuan then ordered vassals to sail his royal barge Kanokratanawiman Mahanawa, following the royal barge Sri Suphannahong to celebrate the auspiciousness of His Majesty.

In 1684, during the reign of King Narai, the spectacle of the procession was in the memoirs of a number of foreign dignitaries who witnessed the event. The Royal Barge Procession was assigned to hail the arrival of Chevalier de Chaumont Mon. Alexandre, the envoy of King Louis XIV to Siam. Nicolas Gervaise, a French missionary and member of the French diplomatic corps, described the procession:–

Unmatched in beauty by any naval spectacle, the procession consisting of over two hundred boats, is led by the Royal Barge manned by oarsmen themselves seated in a double row and distinguished by the red bands on their tunic sleeves. Each oarsman wears a headgear, tunic, and trousers marked by gilded bands. The strokes are synchronized and orchestrated by the rhythmic songs sung in praise of the King. The oars are also gilded. The drapes lining the Royal Barge are embellished with precious stones.

— Nicolas Gervaise (1662–1729), Histoire naturelle et politique du Royaume de Siam (1688). (Translated by Office of the National Culture Commission, Ministry of Education Thailand).

In 1687, Simon de la Loubère, a French diplomat to Siam, handwrote the royal barge procession of King Narai in his famous book, Du Royaume de Siam:–

« Mais, parce qu’en ce païs-là on va plus par eau que par terre, le Roy de Siam a de fort beaux Balons. J’ay déjà dit que le corps d’un Balon n’eſt que d’un ſeul arbre long quelquefois de 16. à 20. toiles. Deux hommes affis les jambes croiſées côte à côte l’un de l’autre fur une planche miſe en travers, ſuffiſent pour en occuper toute la larguer. L'un pagaye à droite, & l'autre à gauche. Pagayer c’est ramer avec la pagaye, & la pagaye eſt une rame courte, qu’on tient à deux mains, par le milieu, & par le bout. Il ſemble qu’on n’en faffe que balayer l’eau quoy qu’avec force. Elle n’eſt point attachée au bord du balon, & celuy, qui la manie, regarde où il va; au lieu que celuy qui ramel a le dos tourné à la route. Il y a quelquefois dans un feul balon juſqu’à cent ou fix vingt pagayeurs rangez ainſi deux à deux les jambes croiſees ſur des planchettes: mais les moindres Officiers ont des baIons beaucoup plus courts, ou peu de pagayes, comme 16. ou 20. ſuffiſent. Les pagayeurs, afin de plonger la pagaye de concert, chantent, ou font des cris meſurez; & ils plongent la pagaye en cadence avec un mouvement de bras & d'épaules qui eſt vigoureux, mais facile & de bonne grace. »

(Translation): Because in Siam we only travel by water rather than by land, the King of Siam has many beautiful barges. I have said a barge made from only a single tree sometimes takes 16 to 20 wa (32–40 meters) in length. Two men sit cross-legged, parallel to each other. One paddles to the right, and the other to the left. Boating is to row with the paddle, and the paddle is a short oar, which is held in both hands, by the middle, and by the end. All we do is sweep the water with force. It is not attached to the edge of the barge, and the person rowing the boat faces the bow and paddles down with his back to the stern. For a single barge, there are sometimes a hundred or up to twenty paddlers arranged two by two with their legs crossed on planks; however, the lesser officers have shorter boats or fewer paddlers, like 16 or 20 paddlers. In order to plunge the paddle together, the paddlers sing or roar; they plunge in rhythm with a movement of arms and shoulders that is vigorous, simple, and graceful.

— Simon de la Loubère, DU ROYAUME DE SIAM : Envoyé extraordinaire du ROY auprès du Roy de Siam en 1687 & 1688.

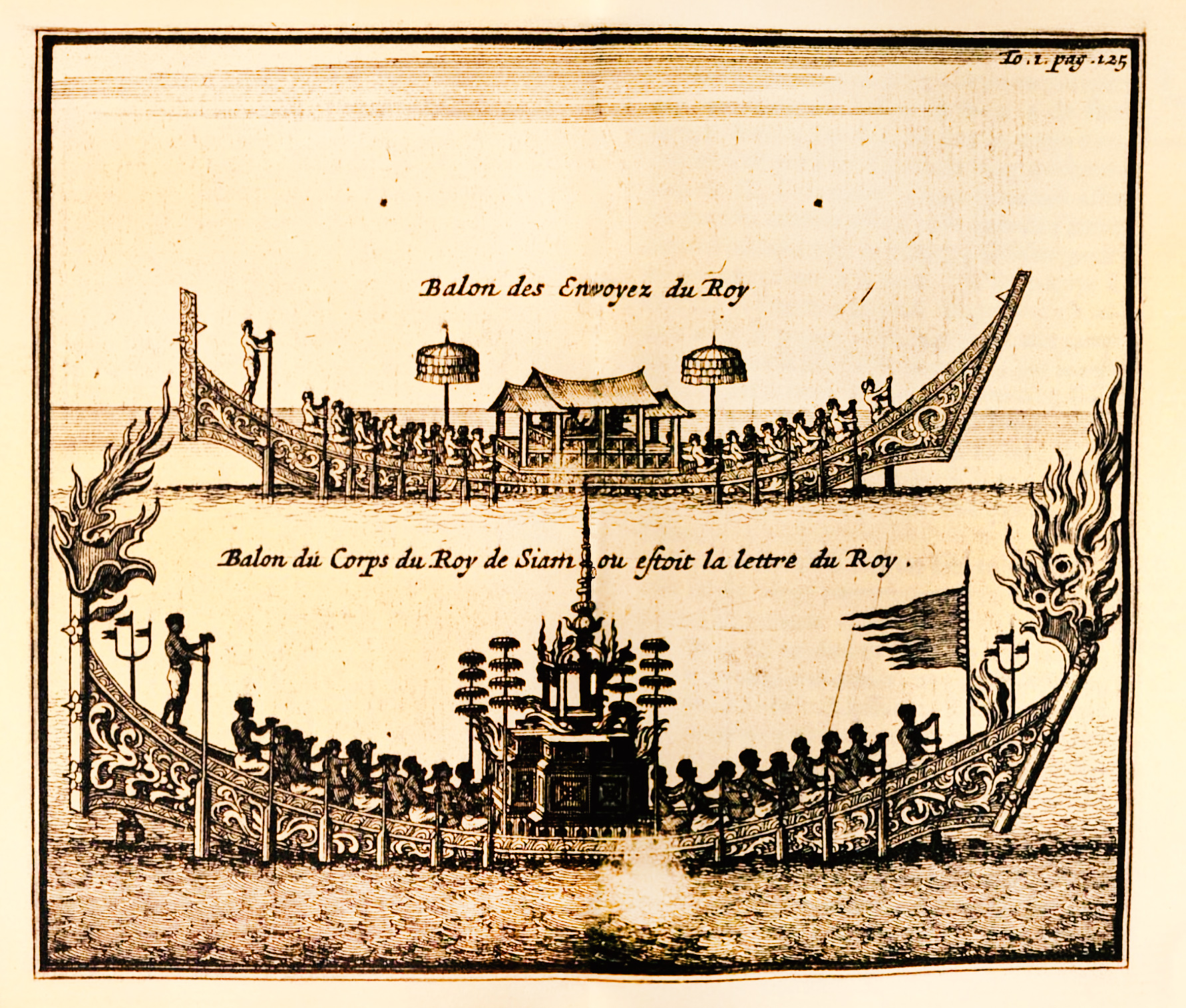
Balon du Corps du Roy de Siam ou eſtoit la lattre du Roy. The Royal barge of King of Siam in 1687–88 illustrated by Simon de La Loubère, French diplomat to Siam of King Louis XIV.

European visitors witnessed and wrote about "an immense procession with 200 boats" upon their arrival in Thailand in the 17th century; one witness was Pierre Brigot, bishop of Tabraca Vicar Apostolic in Siam; later, it was collected in the book History of the Kingdom of Siam (1770) compiled by François Henri Turpin:–

It is impossible to compare the beauty of the immense procession with 200 boats. The Royal barges travelled in two in the front. All oarsmen have been trained to an admirable proficiency, dressed uniformly in gold- trimmed hats, tunic, knee and arm bands. All rowing in synchronized movement and rhythm. The oars also of gold, touch the water with a sound that harmonizes with the boat song sung in praise of the King

— François Henri Turpin (Compiler), History of the Kingdom of Siam: And of the Revolutions that Have Caused the Overthrow of the Empire, Up to A.D. 1770.

During the processions, the oarsmen were kept in rhythm by the beating of drums, with accompanying music. This traditional boat song was written by Prince Dhamma Dibes of the late-Ayutthaya period.

Most of the vessels in the procession doubled as warships, and when war erupted, the barges and boats were used as weapons.

=== Thonburi era ===
In 1767, the Burmese invaded Ayutthaya Kingdom, and, for the second and last time, were able to capture the capital, Ayutthaya. The entire fleet was burned and destroyed after the Burmese found them at their hideaway. General Taksin rallied the Thais and established a new capital at Thonburi. During his short 15-year reign, Taksin ordered the reconstruction of the barge fleet, and used a fleet of 115 barges to carry a revered likeness of Buddha to his new capital.

Chao Phaya Chakri succeeded King Taksin and moved the capital to the east side of the river to what is now known as Bangkok. Chao Phaya Chakri, founder of the Chakri dynasty, ruled as King Buddha Yodfah (Rama I) and began the Royal Kathin Ceremony Procession. The Kathin Ceremony is a presentation of Kathin robes to monks and earns merit by honoring and supporting Buddhism.

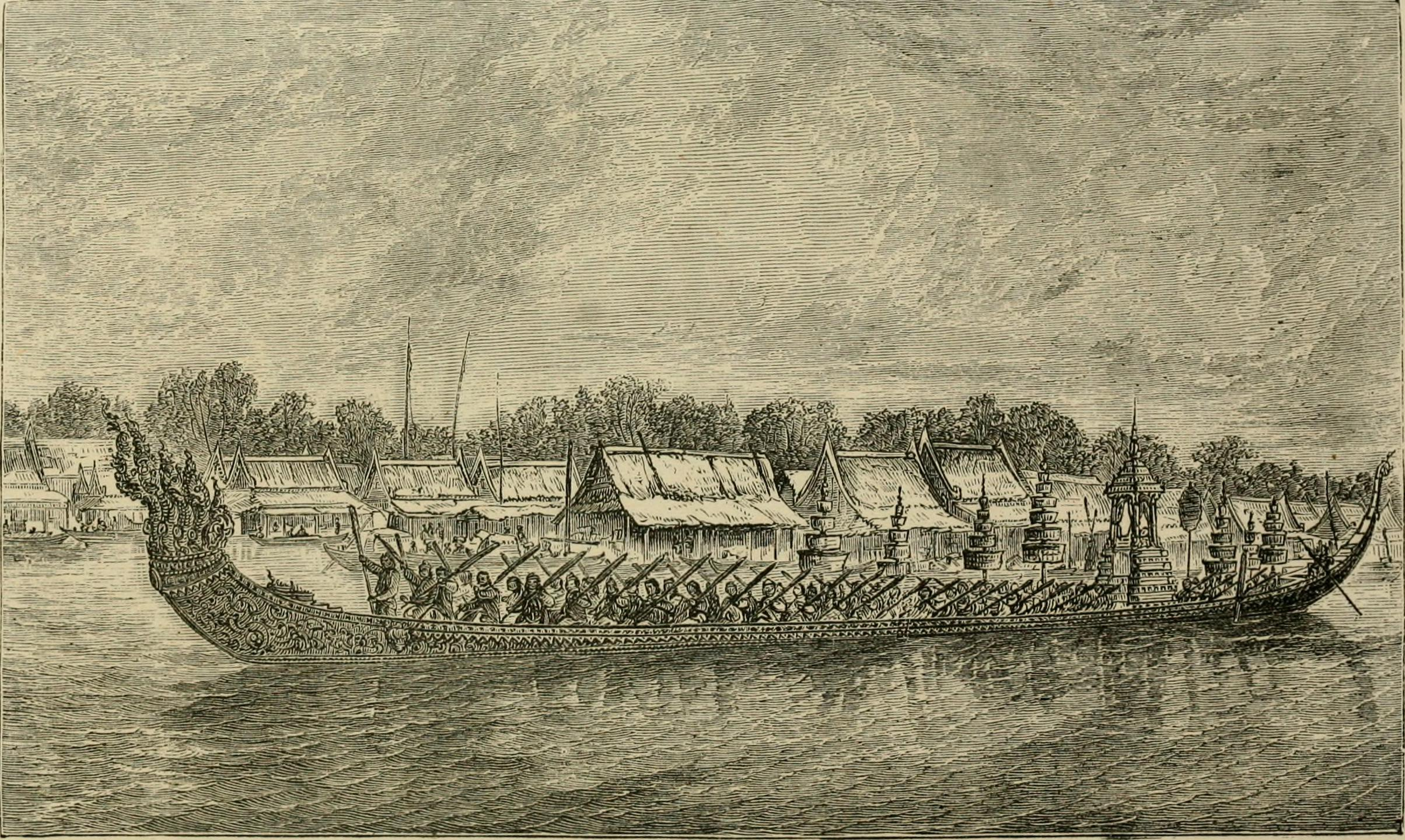
Illustration of Royal Barge Anantanakkharat, 1873.

=== Rattanakosin era–present ===
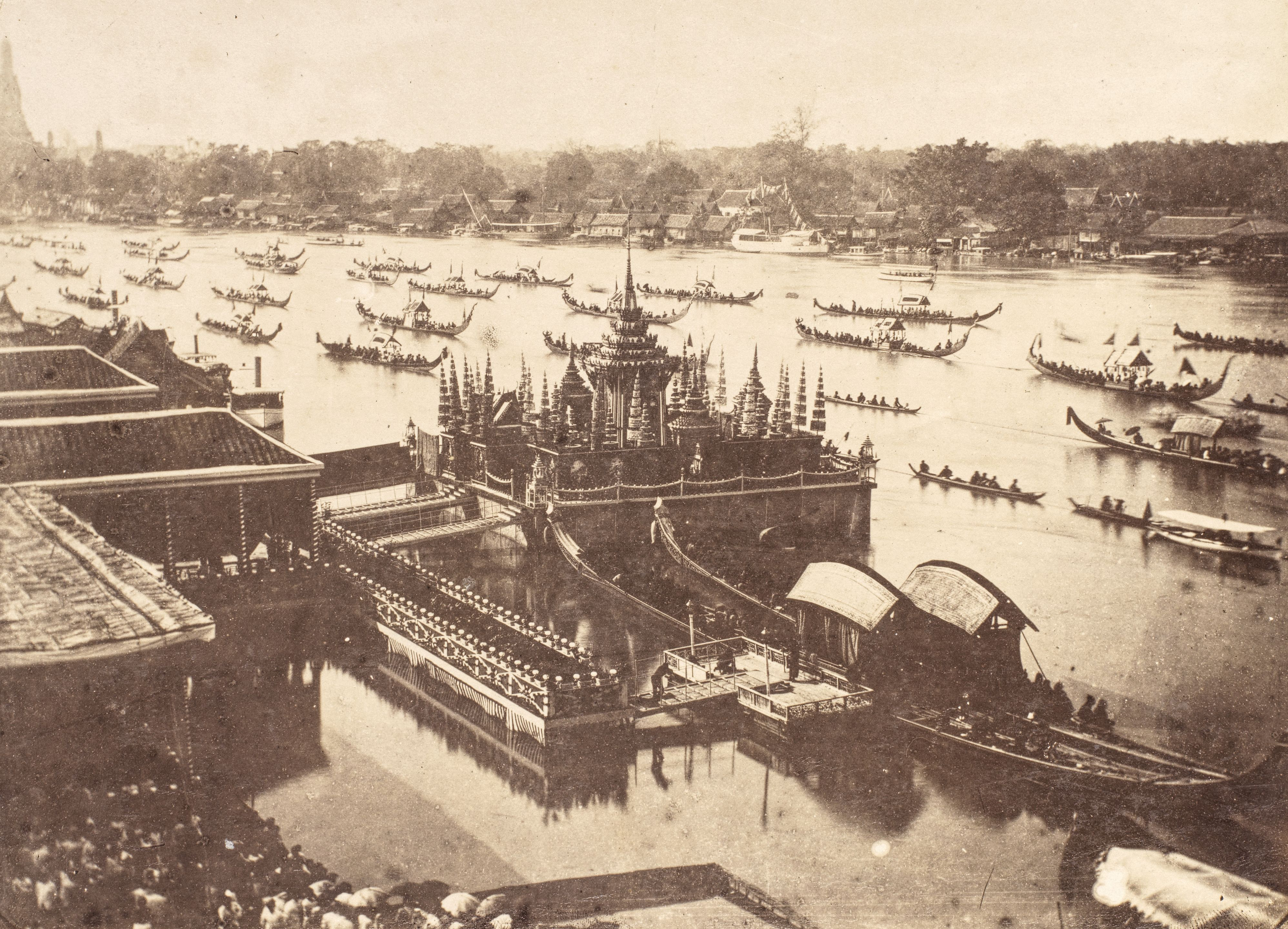
The Royal Bathing Ceremony "แพลงสรง พ.ศ. ๒๔๒๙" (in Thai) was held on 14 January 1886, for Vajirunhis, the Crown Prince of Siam, during the reign of King Rama V. This event was captured in a photograph album given to Mrs. Bertha Honoré Palmer by Queen Savang Vadhana, the Queen of Siam, in commemoration of the Siamese Exhibit in the Woman's Building at the World's World's Columbian Exposition in Chicago, United States of America. The exposition was held from May 5 to October 31, 1893.

Soon after his coronation in 1782, King Rama I ordered construction of the royal barge Si Suphannahong. The Si Suphannahong was the principal royal barge for more than a century. In 1911, King Rama VI launched its successor, also named Suphannahong.

The Prince of Nakhon Sawan, during the reign of Rama V, devised fleet formations, which became the standard "major" and "minor" formations used today.3

In 1870, Anna H. Leonowens, the teacher to the children of the Siamese, wrote of the Royal Barge Procession of Ananta Nakkharat boat on her own distinct perspective and experience in the heart of an Asiatic court in the reign of King Rama V. Her work was published in the English Governess at the Siamese Court—the forbidden resale book in Siam.:–

The royal state barge, one hundred cubits long, beside being elaborately carved, and inlaid with bits of crystal, porcelain, mother-of-pearl, and jade, is richly enamelled and gilt. The stem, which rises ten or eleven feet from the bows, represents the nagha mustakha sapta, the sevenheaded serpent or alligator. A phrasat, or elevated throne (also termed p'hra-the-nang), occupies the centre, supported by four pillars. The extraordinary beauty of the inlaying of shells, mother-of-pearl, crystal, and precious stones of every color, the splendor of the gilding, and the elegance of the costly kinkob curtains with which it is hung, combine to render this one of the most striking and beautiful objects to be seen on the Meinam. The barge is usually manned by one hundred and fifty men, their paddles gilt and silver-tipped.

— Anna Harriette Leonowens, The English Governess at the Siamese Court, 26 July 1870.

Processions took place occasionally, including the Royal Barge Procession for the Bangkok Sesquicentennial Celebrations in April 1932, the last before absolute monarchy ended in June the same year. Most of the royal barges were kept near Thonburi train station. It was bombed in WWII, destroying a large number of royal barges. They were not employed again until the celebration of the 25th century of the Buddhist Era in 1957. In 1959, Bhumibol Adulyadej revived the Royal Barge Procession as a means of presenting the Royal Kathin (robes for monks) in a royal ceremony.

== Notable processions ==
=== King Rama V ===
In the reign of King Rama V, Chulalongkorn (r. 1868–1910), notable royal barge processions were conducted:

- Royal Barge Procession for the Royal Bathing Ceremony of Crown Prince Vajirunhis, 14 January 1886

=== King Rama VII ===
In the reign of King Rama VII, Prajadhipok (r. 1925–1935), several royal barge processions were conducted and were among the last before the 1932 Siamese Revolution:

- Royal Barge Procession for Royal Kathin Ceremony at Wat Arun, c. 1930 (video)
- Royal Barge Procession in the Bangkok Sesquicentennial Celebrations, c. April 1932

=== King Rama IX ===
In the reign of King Rama IX, Bhumibol Adulyadej (r. 1946–2016), 16 royal barge processions were conducted:

==== Major sailings ====
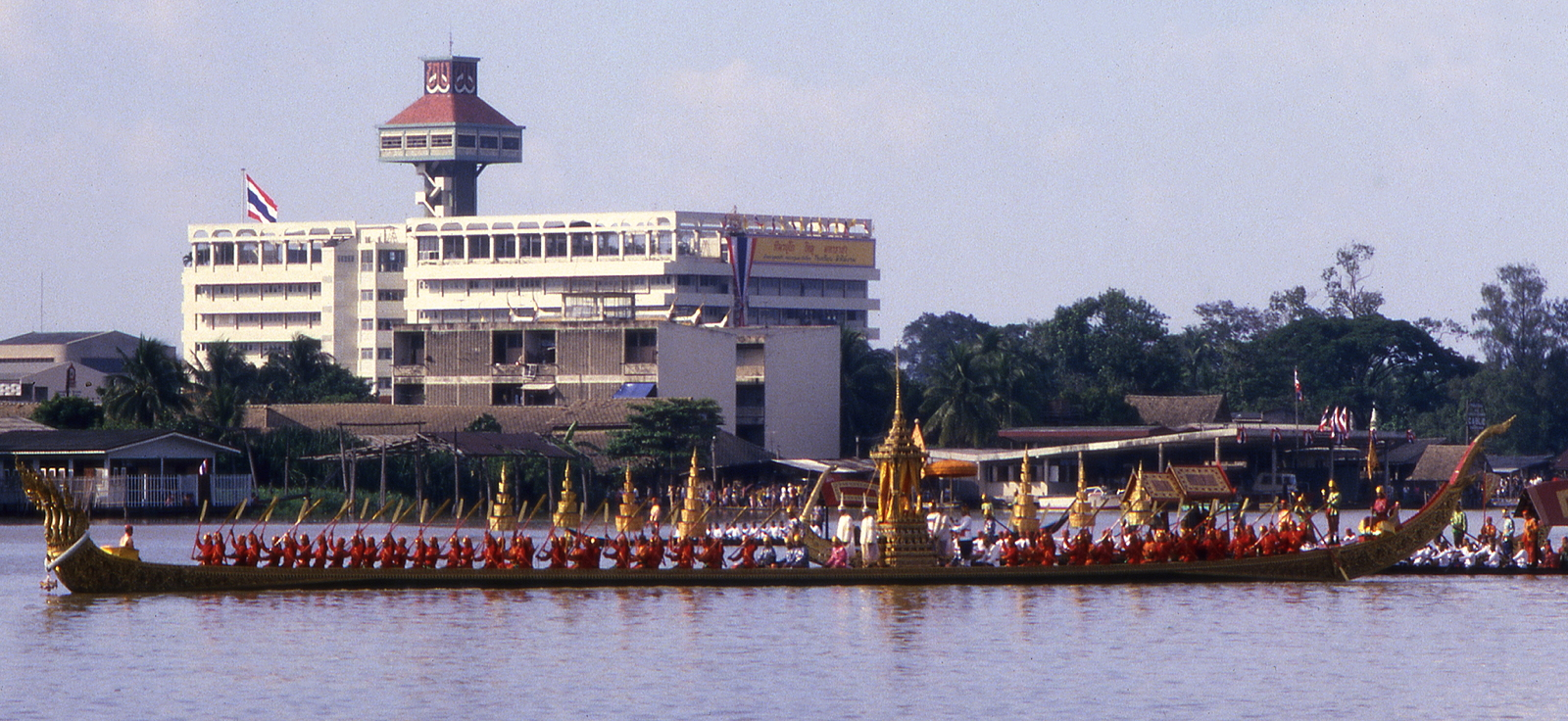
Royal Barge Anantanakkharat at the 1987 procession

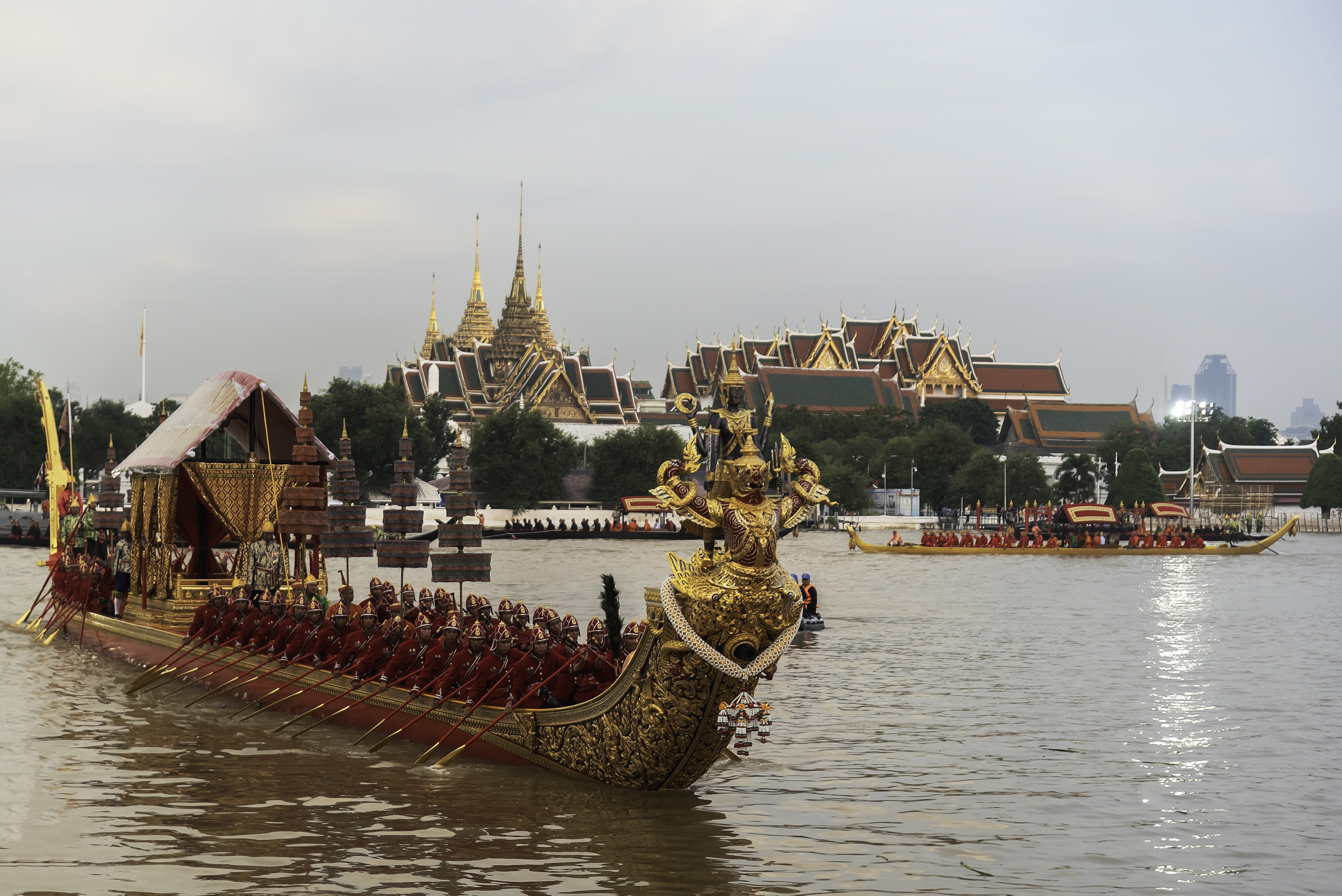
Royal Barge Procession rehearsal at Grand Palace, 2024

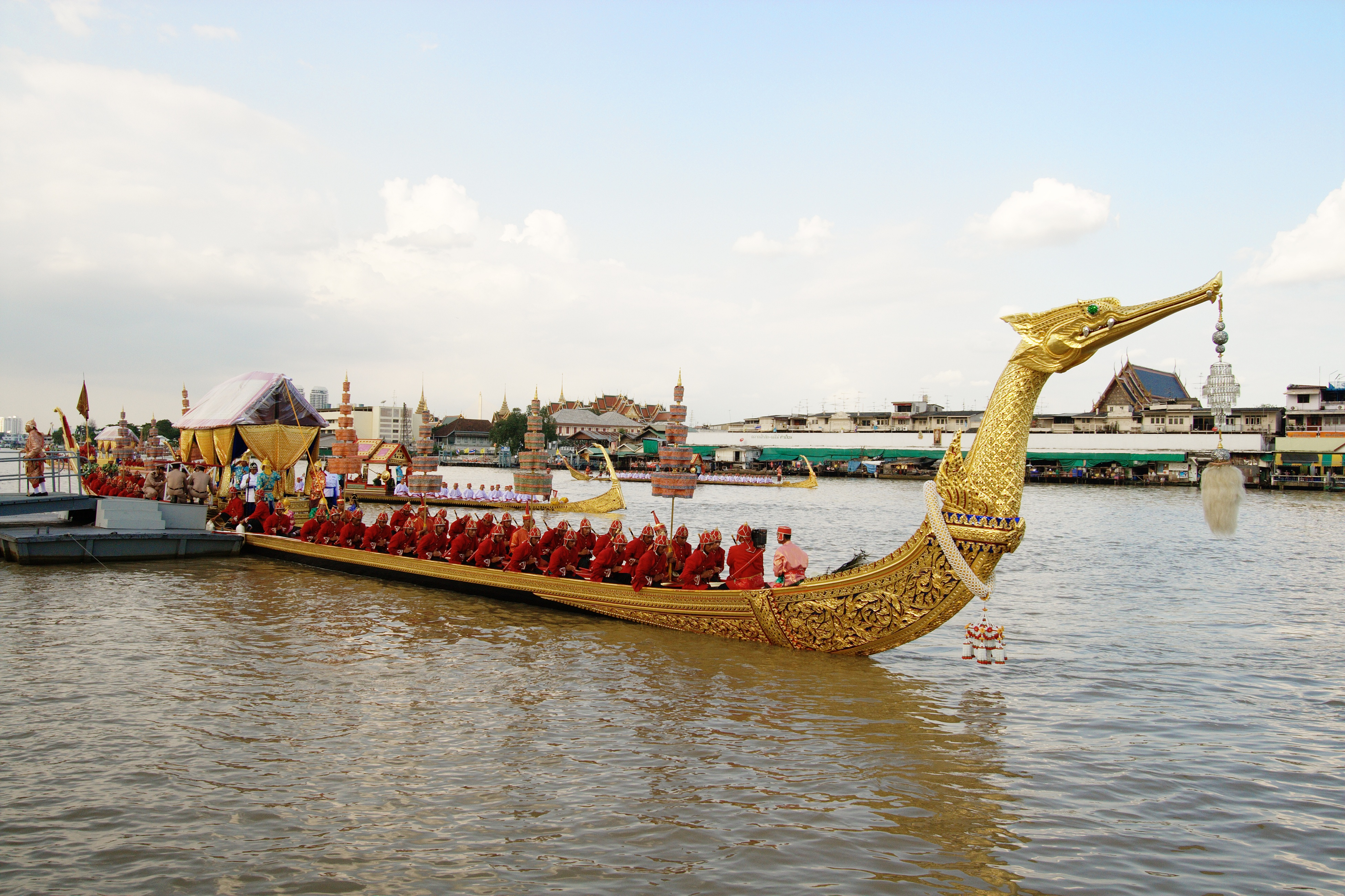
Royal Barge Suphannahong arrives at Wat Arun for Royal Kathin Ceremony in 2007

- The Buddhist Era 25th century celebrations - 14 May 1957
- Royal Barge Procession in the Bangkok Bicentenary Celebrations, 5 April 1982
- Royal Barge Procession for Royal Kathin Ceremony at Wat Arun, 20 October 1982
- Royal Barge Procession for Royal Kathin Ceremony at Wat Arun, 16 October 1987 (King's 60th Birthday)
- Royal Barge Procession for Royal Kathin Ceremony at Wat Arun, 7 November 1996 (King's 50th anniversary on the throne)
- Royal Barge Procession for Royal Kathin Ceremony at Wat Arun, 4 November 1999 (King's 6th cycle, 72 years old)
- Royal Barge Procession for APEC Meeting 20 October 2003
- King's 60th – Diamond Jubilee of the king's accession to the throne. 12 June 2006 (52 barges) (video)
- Royal Barge Procession for Royal Kathin Ceremony at Wat Arun, 5 November 2007 (King's 80th Birthday) (video)
- Royal Barge Procession for Royal Kathin Ceremony at Wat Arun, scheduled for 22 October 2011 (King's 7th cycle, 84 years old), but postponed due to massive flooding and run on 9 November 2012. (video)

==== Additional sailings (Royal Kathin) ====
- Royal Barge Procession for Royal Kathin Ceremony at Wat Arun, 15 November 1959
- Royal Barge Procession for Royal Kathin Ceremony at Wat Arun, 2 November 1961
- Royal Barge Procession for Royal Kathin Ceremony at Wat Arun, 22 October 1962
- Royal Barge Procession for Royal Kathin Ceremony at Wat Arun, 15 November 1964
- Royal Barge Procession for Royal Kathin Ceremony at Wat Arun, 19 October 1965
- Royal Barge Procession for Royal Kathin Ceremony at Wat Arun, 27 October 1967
- Barge Procession to transport a Buddha Image, 12 April 1982

=== King Rama X ===
In the reign of King Rama X, Vajiralongkorn (r. 2016–), the following royal barge processions were conducted:

- Royal Barge Procession for the Coronation of King Maha Vajiralongkorn, 12 December 2019 (52 barges) (video)
- Royal Barge Procession for Royal Kathin Ceremony at Wat Arun, 27 October 2024 (King's 6th cycle, 72 years old) (video)
- Royal Barge Procession for Royal Kathin Ceremony at Wat Arun, 6 November 2026 (Queen's 4th cycle, 48 years old)

== Fleet formations ==
The Royal Barge Procession is conducted in one of two formations, the major or the minor. The major formation, also known as the Major Battle Formation (Petch Phuang Major Battle Formation) dates from the time of King Narai. This formation is used for the more significant events, such as the Royal Kathin Ceremony, the movement of a sacred image of Buddha, or important occasions of state. The Petch Phuang Formation is arranged into five columns, with the royal barges in the center, and two rows of war barges on each side. In the minor formation, there are three columns, the royal barges in the middle, and a single row on each side.

=== Major barge procession formation ===
Arranged in five rows.

- 1 pair of lead barges which historically carried high-ranking officials with the position equivalent to today's ministry permanent secretary.
- 1 pair of ancient Thai battle boats with cannons at the bow. They historically carried military courtiers.
- 2 pairs of plain outer barges
- 4 pairs of inner barges with decorated mastheads in the shape of the garuda, monkeys, and ogres.
- 1 outer drum boat, 1 inner drum boat, with six musicians each playing the Pi and the klong khaek.
- 1 inner, 1 outer boat for the Royal Police.
- The Ekachai Barge with covered throne for monks' robes, the Buddha image or flower arrangements complete with regalia.
- The Ekachai Hern Hao Barge and the Ekachai Lao Thong Barge, carrying musicians from the Prakhom band of the Bureau of the Royal Household and the military bands of the Royal Thai Army to lead the Royal Barge.
- The Royal Barge with covered throne and regalia
- Pavilion Barge for the king's change of robes
- Second Royal barge
- 1 pair of Police barges
- 2 pairs of Army barges
- 1 pair of plain rear barges

=== Minor barge procession formation ===
- 1 pair lead barges
- 1 pair attack barges
- 7 pairs plain barges
- 4 pairs animal masthead barges
- 1 left drum boat, 1 right drum boat
- 2 police boats—left and right
- The Ekachai Barge with a covered throne for the monks' robes, a Buddha figure or a flower arrangement complete with regalia
- The Ekachai Hern Hao Barge with musicians and the Ekachai Lao Thong Barge
- The royal barge with appropriate regalia
- The second royal barge
- 1 pair police barges

== The barges ==
=== The royal barges ===
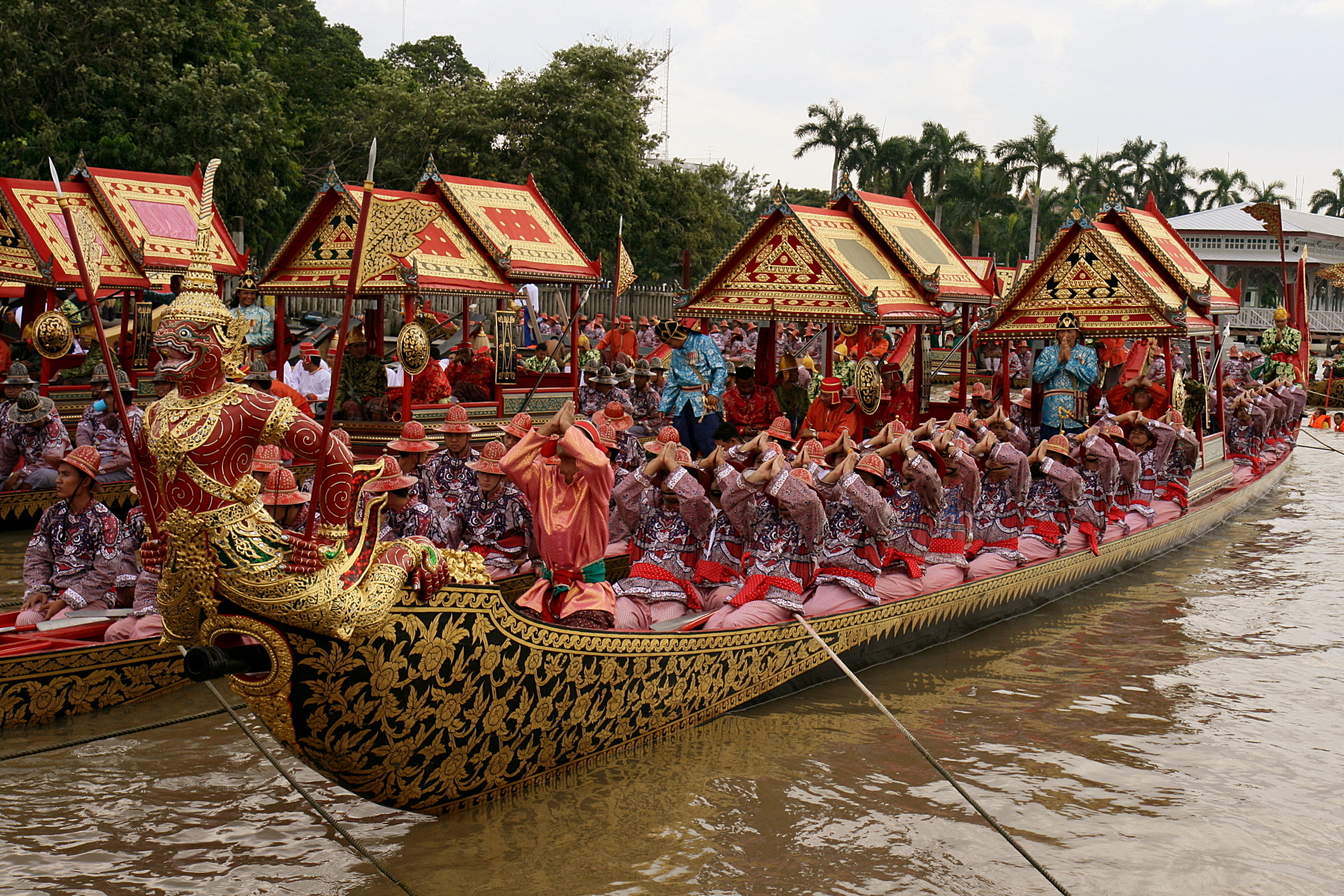
Crew of Sukhrip Khrong Mueang performing the ritual wai to Mae Ya Nang, the female spirit believed to be in every boat

- The royal barge Suphannahong (Thai: เรือพระที่นั่งสุพรรณหงส์; 'Golden Swan' or the 'Phoenix') was built in 1911 during the reign of Rama VI (King Vajiravudh) with a bow resembling a mythical swan, or hong, adorned with gold lacquer and glass jewels, with a crystalline ball and tassel dangling from her mouth. This 46-meter craft was carved from a single trunk of teakwood, and was launched 13 November 1911. Originally a busabok structure similar to the ones of Anantanakkharat was installed on board, but later it was replaced with a golden pavilion to house the king and his immediate royal family. Suphannahong is the regular royal barge, if a royal is travelling with the procession. Its hull is painted black.

The World Ship Trust, in 1992, named the royal barge Suphannahong a Maritime World Heritage.

- The royal barge Anantanakkharat (Thai: เรือพระที่นั่งอนันตนาคราช; Ananta, 'king of serpents') was built during the reign of Rama III (King Nangklao). It was used as the primary royal barge of Rama IV (King Mongkut). The current Anantanakkharat was built during the reign of Rama VI (King Vajiravudh), and launched on 14 April 1914. The bow is carved into the seven-headed Nakkharat, the mystical snake-like creature, in gold lacquer and glass jewels. Anantanakkharat carries a smaller busabok structure to carry holy objects (such as the image of the Buddha or royal kathina robes), unlike the others royal barges, which are equipped with pavilions. Her hull is painted green.
- The royal barge Anekkachatphuchong (Thai: เรือพระที่นั่งอเนกชาติภุชงค์; 'variety of serpents') is the oldest of the four royal barges, built in the late-19th century during the reign of Rama V, (King Chulalongkorn). While no mythical figure is readily visible on the bow, numerous small ornamental Nāga figures are carved into the bow. The hull of Anekkachatphuchong is painted pink.
- The royal barge Narai Song Suban Ratchakan Thi Kao or the royal barge Narai Song Suban HM King Rama IX (Thai: เรือพระที่นั่งนารายณ์ทรงสุบรรณ รัชกาลที่ ๙; "God Narayana on his carrier, Garuda") is the only barge built during the reign of Bhumibol Adulyadej, who laid the keel in 1994. It was built under commission by the Royal Thai Navy and the Thai Fine Arts Department and was launched 6 May 1996 to coincide with the celebration of the fiftieth anniversary of Bhumibol Adulyadej's accession to the throne. She temporarily took over the role of the main royal barge from Suphannahong for one occasion. She has a red hull. The original Narai Song Suban started life as Mongkol Suban, and had only the Garuda as a figurehead, before having a statue of Narayana retrofitted to her by King Mongkut and renamed Narai Song Suban.

The names of the four royal barges are composed in a consistent rhyme: "Suphannahong", "Narai Song Suban", "Anantanakkharat" and "Anekkachatphuchong". The royal barge's arrangement in the procession would have "Anantanakkharat" leading, with the "Suphannahong", "Narai Song Suban" and "Anekkachatphuchong" following respectively.

	Suphannahong สุพรรณหงส์	Anantanakkharat อนันตนาคราช	Anekkachatphuchong อเนกชาติภุชงค์	Narai Song Suban HM Rama IX นารายณ์ทรงสุบรรณ รัชกาลที่ ๙
Length:	46.15 m	44.85 m	45.67 m	44.30 m
Width at beam:	3.17 m	2.58 m	2.91 m	3.20 m
Hull depth:	94 cm	87 cm	91 cm	110 cm
Draught:	41 cm	31 cm	1.46 m	
Displacement:	15 tons	15.26 tons	7.7 tons	20 tons
Crew:	50 oarsmen 2 steersmen 1 chanter 2 officers fore 2 officers aft 1 signalman 1 standard bearer 7 bearers of the royal insignia	54 oarsmen 2 steersmen 1 chanter 1 signalman 1 standard bearer 7 bearers of the royal insignia	61 oarsmen 2 steersmen 1 chanter 1 signalman 1 standard bearer 2 officers (one fore, one aft); 7 bearers of the royal insignia	50 oarsmen 2 steersmen

=== Other barges ===
==== Escort barges ====
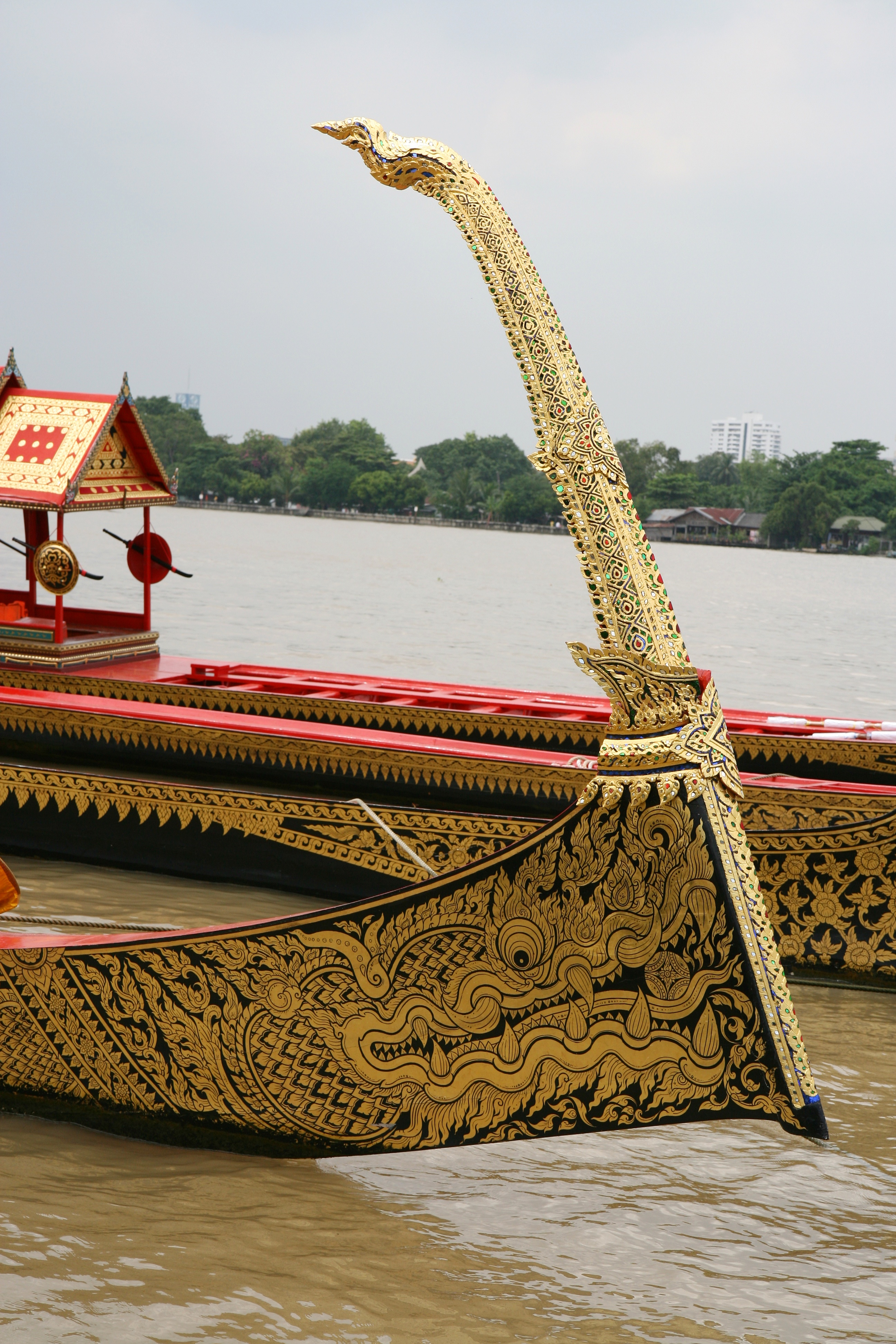
The bow of barge Ekachai Lao Thong

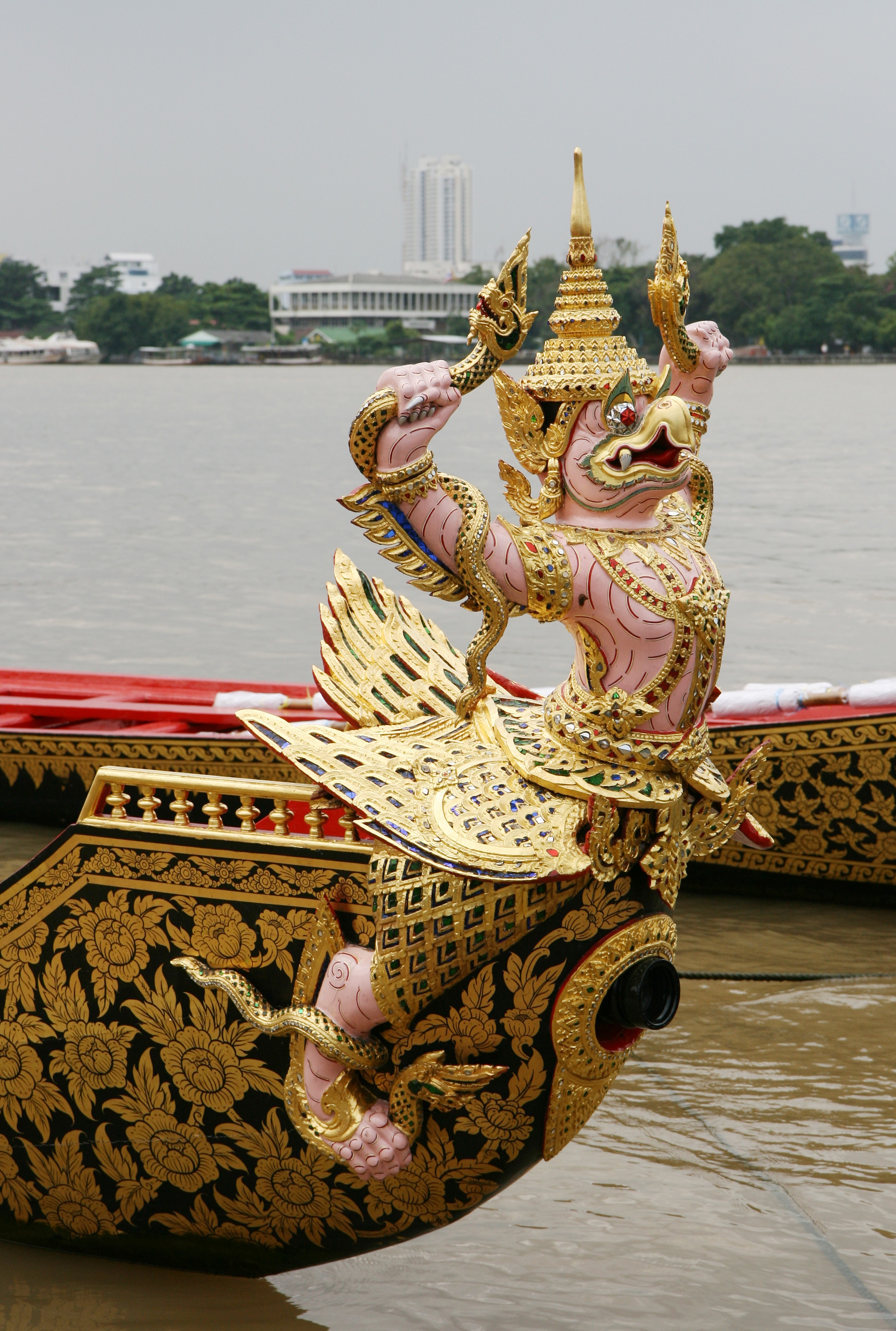
The bow of barge Krut (Garuda) Tret Traichak

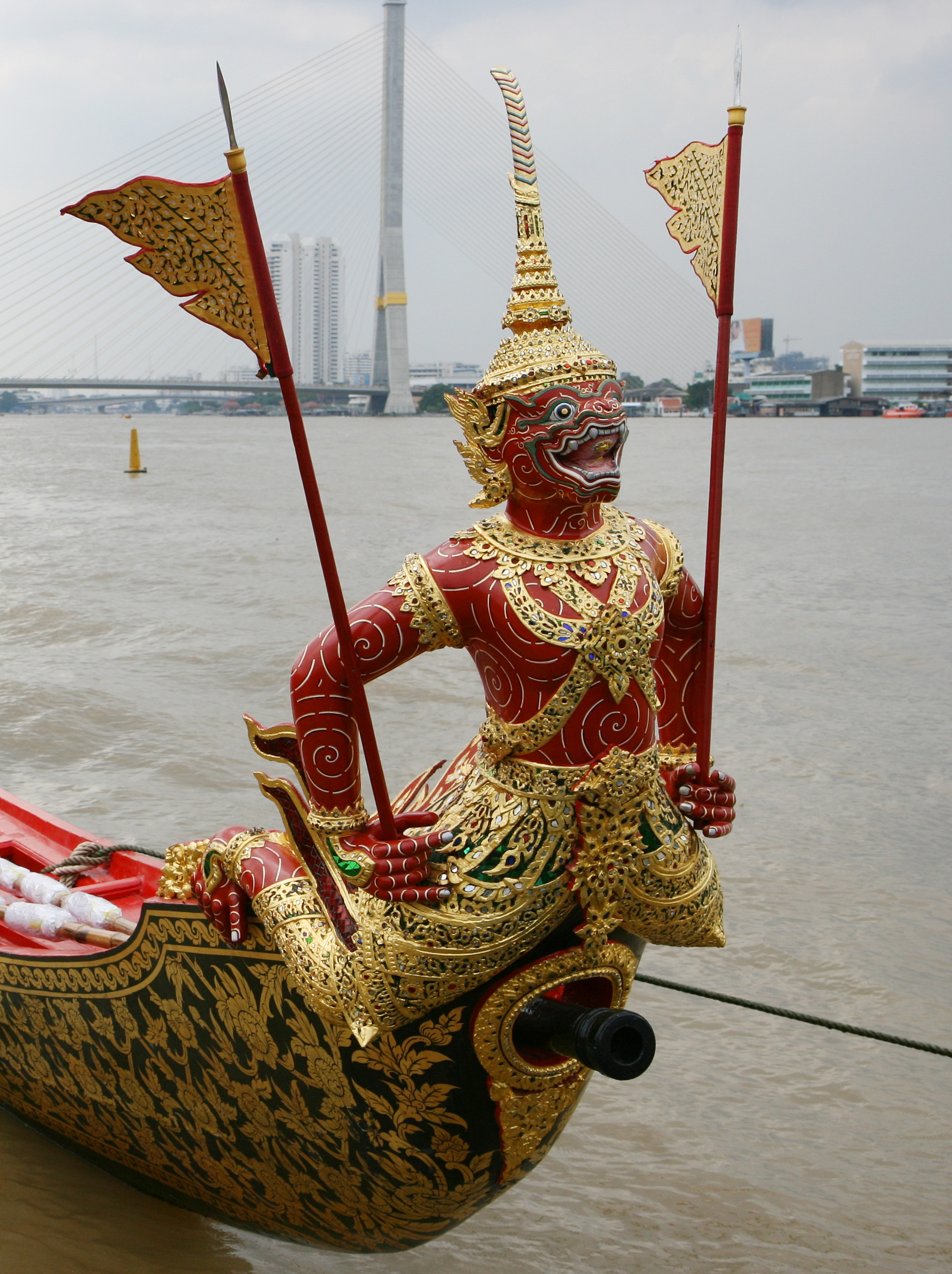
The bow of barge Sukhrip (Sugriva) Khrong Mueang

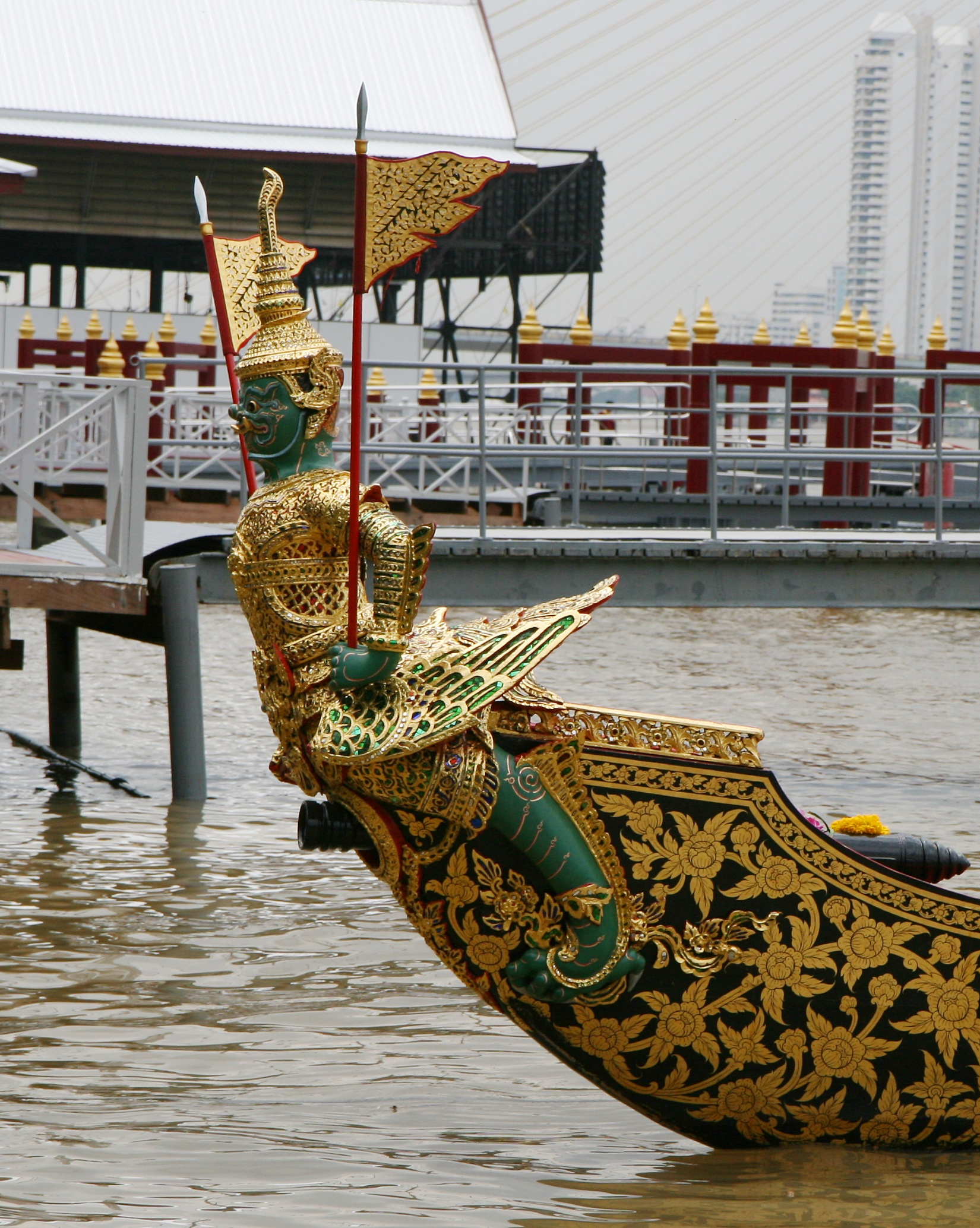
The bow of barge Asura Paksi

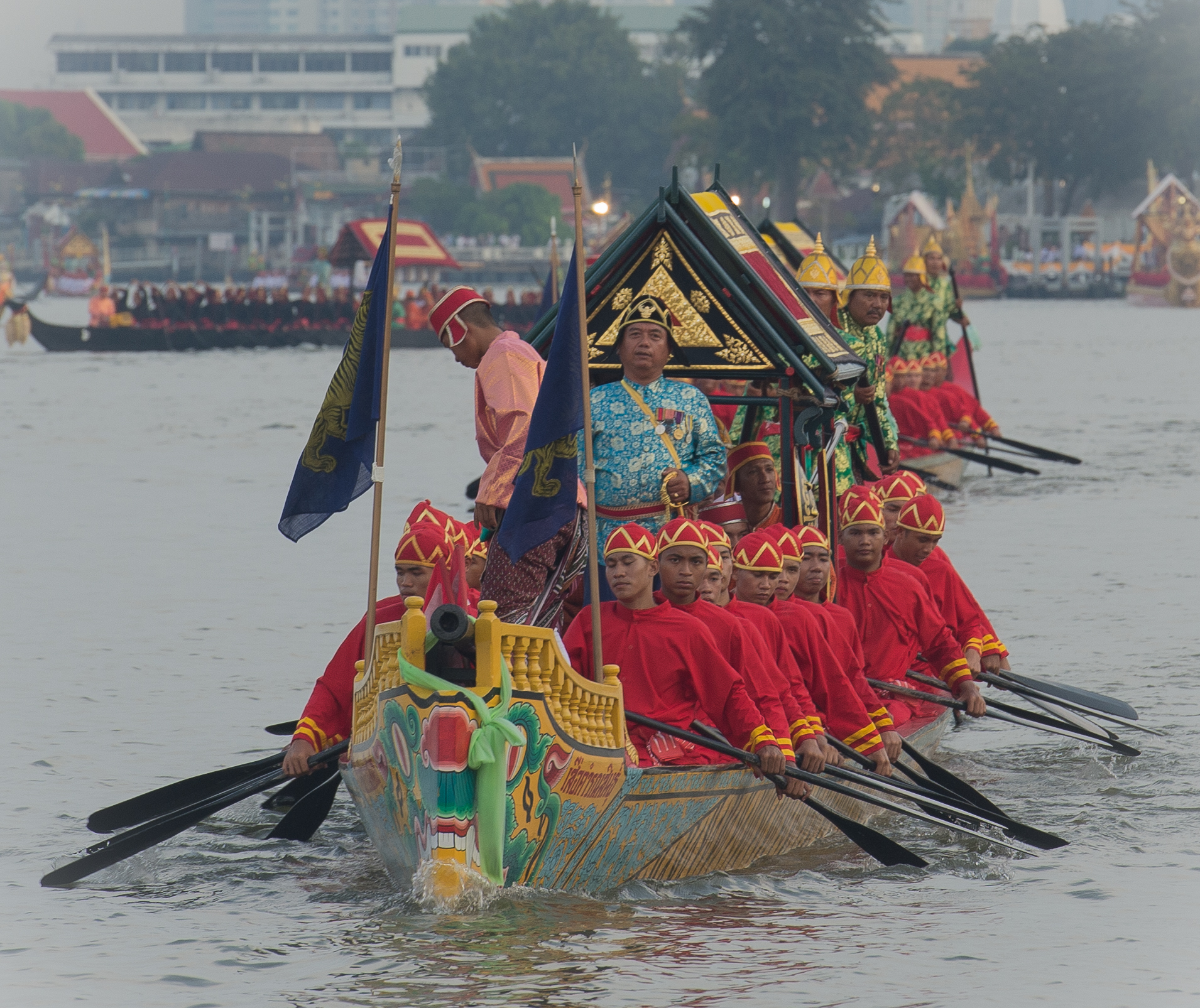
The bow of barge Suea Kamron Sin

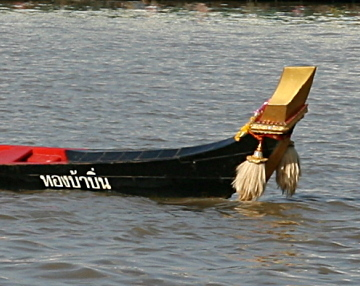
The bow of barge Thong Babin

Escort barges consist of different classes of barges. Most of their bows are decorated with either a painting or a figurehead of a mythical creature. Other types have less elaborate design. The barges with figureheads have rowers dressed in decorated purple uniforms with pink trousers and red ancient-style helmets with a tall crown and wide brim. The oarsmen on the Ekachai class are dressed in white uniforms with pink trousers and small red headgear with havelocks.

- Ekachai-class barges are two barges with a gold painting of a horned creature that is half-nāga half-dragon, Ekachai Hern How and Ekachai Lao Thong. They might be used to tow Suphannahongse against a strong current or when the royal barge needs assistance. Unlike other escort barges, Ekachai class barges are not equipped with cannon. The two barges can be distinguished by their slightly differing eyes. In the past, there have also been Ekachai-like royal barges, one of them was Sri Praphatsorn Chai (Thai: ศรีประภัสสรชัย), but none are in service today after being damaged during World War II. The Ekachai class is currently used to host musicians.
- Krut-class barges are two barges with garuda figureheads with nagas caught on their wings and feet. The garuda on Krut Hern Het (Flying Garuda) is red while the one on Krut Tret Traichak ('Garuda travelling through the three worlds') is pink.
- Krabi-class barges consist of four barges with Vanara figureheads, Pali Rang Thawip (Vali rules the land), Sukhrip Khrong Mueang (Sugriva rules the city), Krabi Ran Ron Rap, and Krabi Prap Mueang Man. The bow of Pali Rang Thawip depicts Vali, the elder brother of Sugriva on Sukhrip Khrong Mueang, rulers of the Kishkindha Kingdom. Both have crowns on their heads with their body colors green and red respectively. Krabi Ran Ron Rap and Krabi Prap Mueang Man ('Monkey defeats the city of evil') feature uncrowned warriors of Vanara Nilaphat (black body) and Hanuman (white body), respectively.
- Asura-class barges are two barges with half-bird, half-ogre figureheads. The bow on Asura Vayuphak has an indigo body in a purple coat; Asura Paksi has a green body in a purple (front) and green (back) coat.
- Suea-class barges are barges with the painting of a tiger, Suea Thayan Chon and Suea Kamron Sin. The names of the barges are clearly written on the bow in red lettering.
- Thong barges are the twin barges that lead the procession. They are shaped much like a smaller, much less elaborate version of Anekkachatpuchong and are painted with their names in white on their bow freeboard area; the tips of their bow and stern are painted in gold. The men on these boats are dress like those on the royal barges, but not entirely alike.

==== Lesser escort barges ====
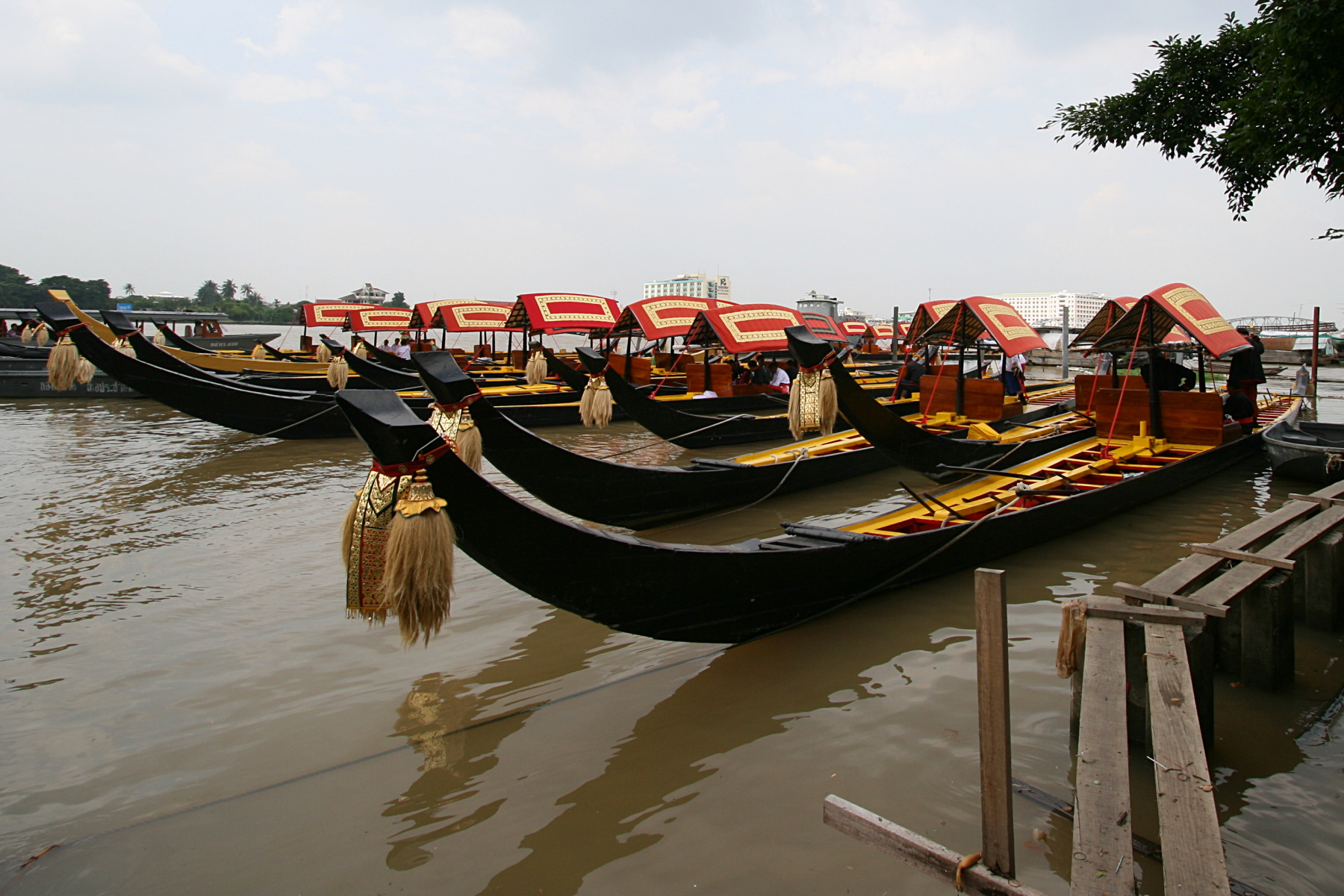
Saeng barges

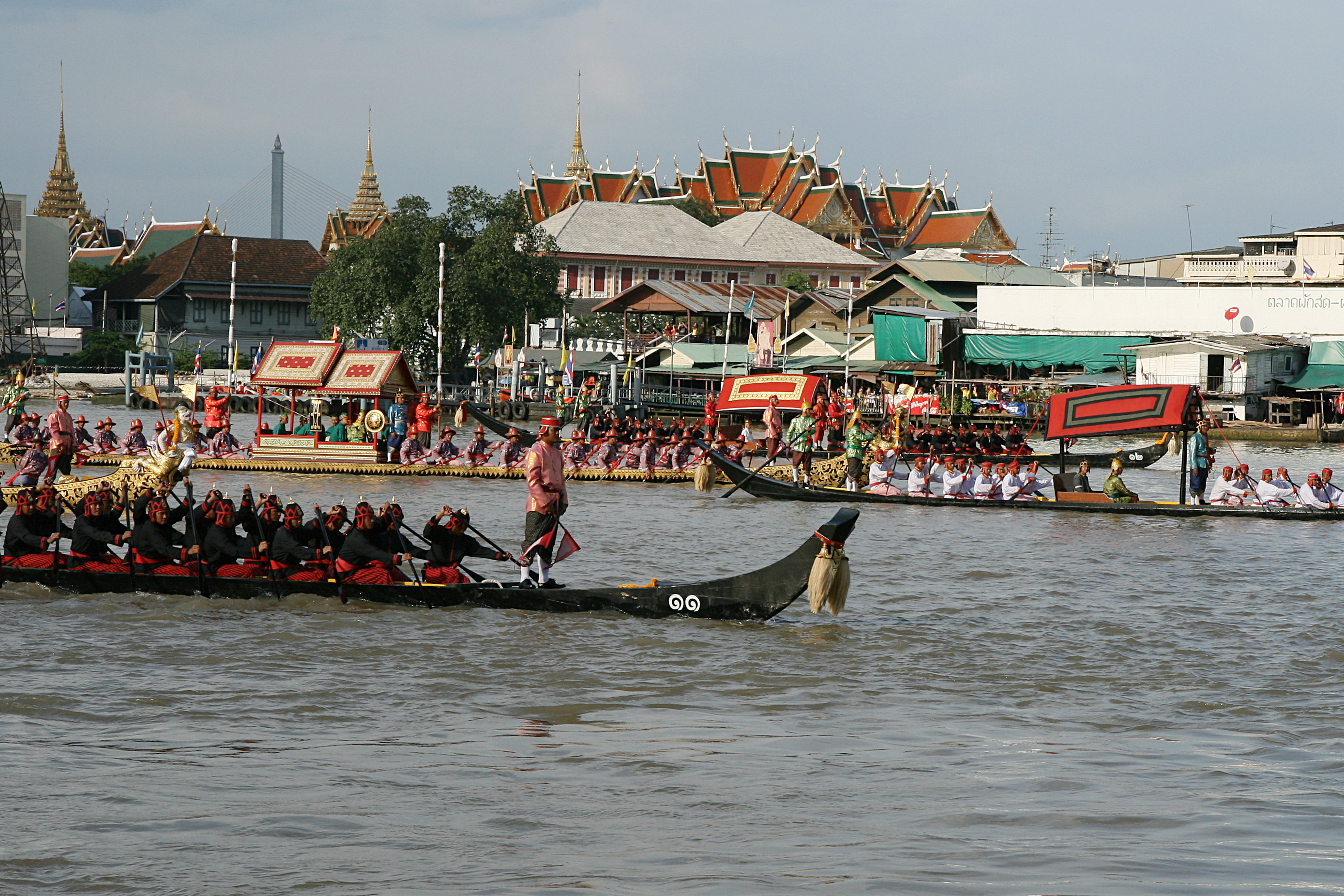
Dang barges

Most of the barges of the fleet are lesser escorts and attendants such as Ruea Dang, Ruea Saeng, police barges, and drum barges. They have no figurehead or cannon. They are painted mostly black, and their type, number, and name (if they have one) is painted on their bows in white. They can be differentiated as follows:

- Police barges have rowers dressed in black and have a relatively flat bow and stern, with the stern raised slightly higher than the bow.
- Saeng barges have a flat bow and stern, but rowers are dressed in white and black headgear; there are also slightly more rowers on these boats. The boats number from one to seven.
- Dang barges have a more pronounced bow and stern, with their shapes similar to those found on the Anekkachatpuchong and the Thong barges, but are smaller, painted black, and less elaborate. These boats number from 1 to 22. Their oarsmen are dressed in black uniforms similar to those of the rowers on royal barges, with red trim on their uniforms.
- The Tangmo ('watermelon') and the E. Leeung barges precede the royal barges. They are shaped like the Police and Saeng barges, but are smaller and sit lower in the water. The oarsmen dress like the rowers on the Saengs.

== Preservation ==
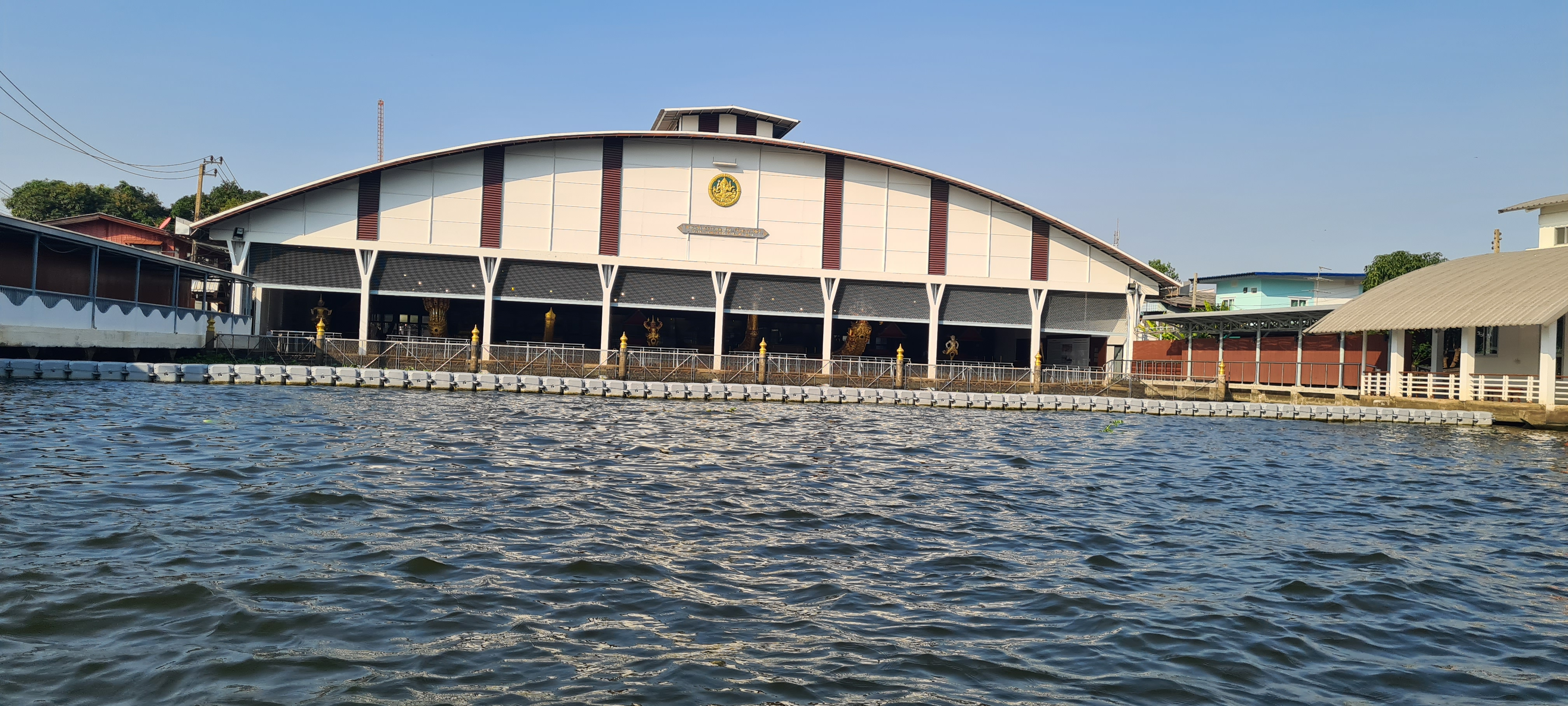
National Museum of Royal Barges in Bangkok

The present fleet of barges was restored during the reign of King Bhumibol Adulyadej, as some had suffered damage in bombing raids on Bangkok during World War II. The dock that stored them, located in the Bangkok Noi District, became the National Museum of Royal Barges. Only eight important barges, including all four royal barges, are displayed in the museum due to limits of space. Displayed with the boats are a number of smaller historical artifacts related to the barge processions, such as old procession layout plans and some partial remains of the older decommissioned and/or damaged boats, including the bow and figurehead of the old Narai Song Suban. The remainder are kept at Wasukri Pier, next to the National Library of Thailand. All are stored out of the water to prevent deterioration. They return to the Chao Phraya River only for a Royal Barge Procession.

== See also ==
- Monarchy of Thailand
- Coronation of the Thai monarch
- 60th Anniversary Celebrations of Bhumibol Adulyadej's Accession
