= List of Nāgas =

Below is a list of Nāgas, a group of serpentine and ancient deities in Hinduism, Buddhism, and Jainism. They are often guardians of hidden treasure and many are upholders of Dharma.

Nāgas are male while Nāgīs or Nāginīs are female.

Religious traditions that feature these entries are sorted using the following key:

- ॐ - Hinduism
- ☸ - Buddhism
- 卐 - Jainism

== List in alphabetical order ==
- Kādraveya - The Nāga born from Kadru ॐ
- Krodhavaśa - a naga of the Kārdaveyas ॐ
- Kṛṣṇagautama - ☸
- Padma - One of the eight kulas (families) of nāgas mentioned by Soḍḍhala in his Udayasundarīkathā
- Virūpākṣa - ☸

=== A ===
- Abhinnaparivārā - ♀ ☸
- Ābhoga - A Nāga King and guardian of the southeast ॐ
- Acilillanā - ♀ ☸
- Airāvaṇa - A Nāga King ☸
- Airāvata - ॐ
- Aīrāvata - ॐ
- Akarkara - ॐ
- Anāgatā - ♀ ☸
- Anākṛtsnagatā - ♀ ☸
- Anavatapta - A Nāga King ☸
- Anīla - ॐ
- Anilāśin - ॐ
- Apalāla - A Nāga King ☸
- Aparājita - A Nāga King ॐ☸
- Āpta - ॐ
- Āryaka - ॐ
- Aśvatara - A Nāga King and several others ॐ☸

=== B ===
- Bāhyakarṇa - ॐ
- Bahumūlaka - ॐ
- Bāliśikha - A Nāga King ॐ
- Bilvapāṇḍura - ॐ

=== C ===
- Campeyya (Pali) - A Nāga King ☸
- Chatramukhā - ♀ ☸
- Chandaka - Commander of the Nãga Army
- Chulodara - A Nāga King ☸

=== D ===
- Dadhimukha - A Nāga King ॐ☸
- Daṇḍapāda - A Nāga King ☸
- Dhanañjaya - ॐ
- Dharmapīṭhā - ♀ ☸
- Dharaṇīdhara - A Nāga King ☸
- Dhṛtarāṣṭra - A Nāga King ॐ☸
- Diśāṃpati - A Nāga King ☸

=== E ===
- Ekaśīrṣā - ♀ ☸
- Elāpatra - A Nāga King ॐ☸

=== G ===
- Gavāṃpati - A Nāga King ☸
- Gośīrṣa - A Nāga King ☸
- Grasatī - ♀ ☸

=== H ===
- Halika - ॐ
- Haridraka - ॐ
- Hastipada - ॐ
- Hastipiṇḍa - ॐ
- Hemaguha - ॐ
- Hullura - A Nāga King ☸

=== I ===
- Irāvān - a half Nāga, son of Arjuna and the Nāga princess Ulūpī ॐ

=== J ===
- Jalabindu - ♀ ☸
- Jayaśrī - ♀ ☸
- Jyotika - ॐ

=== K ===
- Kadrū - Mother of the Pannāga race of Nāgas ॐ
- Kāla - ॐ
- Kālaka - A Nāga King ☸
- Kalaśapotaka - ॐ
- Kālavega - Son of Vāsuki ॐ
- Kāliya - A Nāga King subdued by Krishna ॐ
- Kālīyaka - ॐ
- Kālika - ॐ
- Kalmāṣa - ॐ
- Kambala - A prominent Nāga King ॐ☸
- Karavīra - ॐ
- Kardama - ॐ
- Karkara - ॐ
- Karkoṭaka - A Nāga King ॐ☸
- Kauṇapāśana - ॐ
- Kauravya - A Nāga King ॐ
- Khaga - ॐ
- Kṛṣṇagautama - A Nāga King ☸
- Kṣemaka - ॐ
- Kulika - A Nāga King and guardian of the northwest ॐ☸
- Kumuda - ॐ
- Kumudākṣa - ॐ
- Kuṇḍodara - ॐ
- Kuñjara - ॐ
- Kūśmāṇḍaka - ॐ
- Kuṭhara - ॐ
- Kuṭhāra - ॐ

=== M ===
- Mahākāla - A Nāga King☸
- Mahāmanasvī - A Nāga King☸
- Mahāpadma - A Nāga King and guardian of the northeast ॐ☸
- Mahauṣadhi - ♀ ☸
- Mahodara - A Nāga King ॐ☸
- Manasā - A Nāga queen ॐ
- Manasvin - A Nāga King ☸
- Maṇi - A Nāga King, of which there are two☸
- Maṇināga - ॐ
- Meruśrī - ♀ ☸
- Mṛgaśīrṣa - A Nāga King ☸
- Mṛgila - A Nāga King ☸
- Mṛṣṇāda - ॐ
- Mucilinda - The Nāga who protected the Buddha from the elements ☸
- Mucilindā - ♀ ☸
- Mudgara - ॐ
- Mukhakarā - ♀ ☸

=== N ===
- Naga-Kanya
- Nagaraja
- Nahuṣa - ॐ
- Nanda - A Nāga King. Another name for Śeṣa ॐ☸
- Nīla - ॐ
- Nīlotpalā - ♀ ☸
- Niṣṭhānaka - ॐ
- Nagapooshani - ॐ Hindu Goddess in Nainativu, Sri Lanka

=== P ===
- Padma - A Nāga King ॐ☸
- Padma - A Nāga King and guardian of the south ॐ
- Pāṇḍarameghā - ♀ ☸
- Pannaga - ॐ
- Patta - ॐ
- Piṇḍaka - ॐ
- Piṇḍāraka - ॐ
- Piṅgala - ॐ
- Piñjara - ॐ
- Piṭharaka - ॐ
- Prabhākara - ॐ
- Pulindā - ♀ ☸
- Puṇḍarīka - A Nāga King ☸
- Purāṇanāga - A Nāga King ॐ
- Pūrṇabhadra - A Nāga King ☸
- Pūraṇakarṇa - A Nāga King ☸
- Puṣpadaṃṣṭra - ॐ

=== R ===
- Raktāṅga - ॐ
- Rathābhiruḍhā - ♀ ☸
- Ṛṣika - A Nāga King ☸

=== S ===
- Śabala - ॐ
- Sāgara - A Nāga King ☸
- Sāgaragambhīrā - ♀ ☸
- Sāgarakukṣi - ♀ ☸
- Śakaṭamukha - A Nāga King ☸
- Śākha - ॐ
- Śālipiṇḍaka - ॐ
- Śaṃkha - ॐ
- Śaṃkhamukha - ॐ
- Śaṃkhapiṇḍa - ॐ
- Saṃvṛtta - ॐ
- Śaṅkhapāla - A Nāga King and guardian of the southwest ॐ☸
- Śatabāhu - ♀ ☸
- Śataparivārā - ♀ ☸
- Śataśīrṣa - A Nāga King ☸
- Śatavāhāna - ♀ ☸
- Savāma - ॐ
- Śeṣa - Another name for Nanda ॐ☸
- Śikha - ॐ
- Śirāpūrṇa - ॐ
- Śrītejas - A Nāga prince ☸
- Śrīvaha - ॐ
- Subāhu - ॐ
- Subhūṣaṇā - ♀ ☸
- Sumanā - Wife of Nāga King Campeyya ♀ ☸
- Sumanas - ॐ
- Sumukha - Of which there are several ॐ
- Sunanda - A Nāga King ☸
- Surasā - Mother of the Nāgas as described in the Ramāyāna ॐ
- Svātigiri - ♀ ☸
- Svātimukhā - ♀ ☸

=== T ===
- Takṣaka - A Nāga King ☸
- Timiṃgira - A Nāga King ☸
- Tittiri - ॐ
- Trijaṭā - ♀ ☸
- Tyāgānugatā - ♀ ☸

=== U ===
- Ugraka - ॐ
- Ulūpī - A Nāga princess and wife of Arjuna ॐ
- Upananda - A Nāga King ☸
- Utpala - A Nāga King ☸

=== V ===
- Vahūdaka - A Nāga King ☸
- Varuṇa - A Nāga King and guardian of the west ॐ☸
- Vāsuki - A Nāga King ॐ☸
- Vātsīputra - A Nāga King ☸
- Vidyullocanā - ♀ ☸
- Vidyutprabhā - ♀ ☸
- Vijayaśrī - ♀ ☸
- Vilvaka - ॐ
- Vimalapiṇḍaka - A Nāga King ॐ
- Viraja - ॐ
- Virūpākṣa - A Nāga King ☸
- Vīryā - ♀ ☸
- Vishvahini - The wife of Vasuki
- Vṛtta - ॐ
