= Nāga Saṃyutta =

The Nāga Saṃyutta is a Buddhist scripture of the Pali Canon. It is the 29th Saṃyutta in the Saṃyutta Nikāya, placed in the Khandha Vaggasaṃyutta.

== Content ==
The Nāga Saṃyutta, also known as the Linked Discourses on Dragons, provides basic accounts of the nature of the nāgas; serpentine deities in Buddhist mythology. The Buddha describes these beings in regards to their mode of birth, hierarchy, as well as the reasons one may be reborn among them.

=== Suttas ===
A total of fifty suttas are found in the text. Suttas 11-20 and 21-50 are each abbreviated into a single discourse.

1) Suddhika Sutta
2) Paṇītatara Sutta
3) Uposatha Sutta
4) Dutiyauposatha Sutta
5) Tatiyauposatha Sutta
6) Catutthauposatha Sutta
7) Suta Sutta
8) Dutiyasuta Sutta
9) Tatiyasuta Sutta
10) Catutthasuta Sutta
11-20) Aṇḍajadānūpakārasuttadasaka
21-50) Jalābujādidānūpakārasuttattiṃsaka

== English translations ==
- Sutta Central: Bhikkhu Sujato
- Mettanet Tipitaka Index: Bhikkuni Uppalavanna

== See also ==
- Naga
- Saṃyutta Nikāya
