= Nāga =

Legendary beings in the cultures and religions of tropical Asia

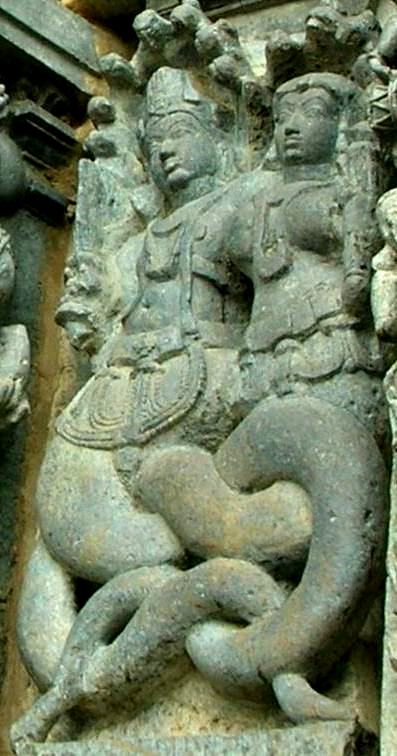
- A nāga couple, featured as a Chennakeshava Temple relief
- Devanagari: नाग
- Venerated in: Hinduism, Buddhism
- Abode: Patala
- Texts: Mahabharata, Puranas

In various Asian religious traditions, the Nāgas (Sanskrit: नाग, romanized: Nāga) are a divine or semi-divine race of half-human, half-serpent beings that reside in the netherworld (Patala), and can occasionally take human or part-human form, or are so depicted in art. Furthermore, nāgas are also known as dragons and water spirits. A female nāga is called a Nagini (Hindi: नागिन nāgin). According to legend, they are the children of the sage Kashyapa and Kadru. Rituals devoted to these supernatural beings have been taking place throughout South Asia for at least 2,000 years. They are principally depicted in three forms: as entirely human with snakes on the heads and necks, as common serpents, or as half-human, half-snake beings in Hinduism and Buddhism.

Nagaraja is the title given to the king of the nagas. Narratives of these beings hold cultural significance in the mythological traditions of many South Asian and Southeast Asian cultures, and within Hinduism and Buddhism. Communities such as the Nagavamshi, Khmer and Sri Lankan Tamils claim descent from this race.

== Etymology ==
In Sanskrit, a nāga (नाग) primarily refers to a snake, most often specifically the Indian cobra (Naja naja). However, the term is also used generically to denote any snake, sharing this broader meaning with other common Sanskrit synonyms such as sarpa (सर्प) and phaṇin (फणिन्).

The word was once believed to be a cognate with the English "snake", tracing back to the Germanic *snēk-a- and the Proto-Indo-European (PIE) root *(s)nēg-o- (featuring an s-mobile). However, a later alternative and now accepted Indo-European etymology suggests a connection to the concept of a "hairless, naked animal" as nāga in Sanskrit is polysemous also for "mountain" or "elephant" depending on various other contexts—making it a cognate with the English word "naked" via PIE *nogʷnós.

== Hinduism ==
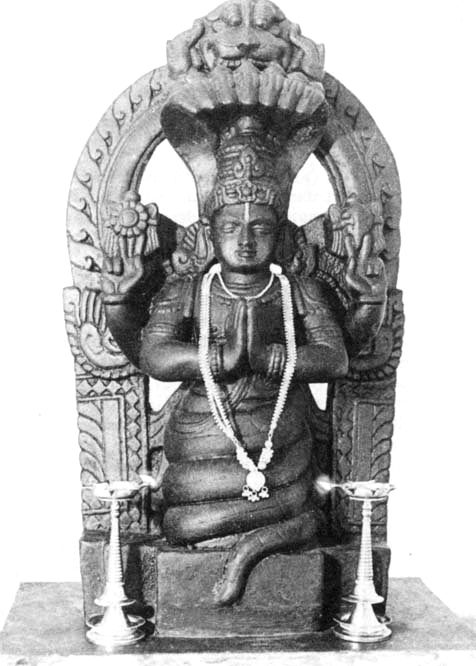
Patanjali as Śeṣa.

Nāgas, as a serpent-shaped group of deities that often take form as cobras, are prominent in Hindu iconography, throughout Hindu texts (especially in the first book of the Mahābhārata) and in local folk traditions of worship. In some regions of the Himalaya, nāgas are regarded as the divine rulers of the region – for example, in Kullu Valley, in Berinag and in the valley of the Pindar River, which is believed to be ruled by the ninefold Naiṇī Devī. Both in the Nilamata Purana of Kashmir and in the Swayambhu Purana of Kathmandu, the respective region begins its history as a lake, populated by nāgas, which is later drained.

Ancient Sanskrit texts such as the Mahabharata, the Ramayana, and the Puranas describe the nāgas as a powerful, splendid and proud semi-divine species that can assume their physical form either as human (often with a halo of cobra hoods behind their head), as a partially human serpent, or as a whole serpent. Their domain is in the enchanted underworld, the underground realm filled with gems, gold and other earthly treasures called Naga-loka or Patala-loka. They are also often associated with bodies of waters—including rivers, lakes, seas, and wells—and are guardians of treasure. Their power and venom make them potentially dangerous to humans. However, in Hindu mythology, they often take the role of benevolent protagonists: in the Samudra Manthana, Vasuki, a nagaraja who abides on Shiva's neck, became the churning rope for churning of the Ocean of Milk. Their eternal archrival is the Garuḍa, the legendary semi-divine bird-like deity.

Vishnu is originally portrayed in the form sheltered by Sheshanāga or reclining on Shesha, but the iconography has been extended to other deities as well. The serpent is a common feature in Ganesha iconography, and appears in many forms: around the neck, use as a sacred thread (Sanskrit: yajñopavīta) wrapped around the stomach as a belt, held in a hand, coiled at the ankles, or as a throne. Shiva is often shown garlanded with a snake. Maehle (2006: p. 297) states that "Patanjali is thought to be a manifestation of the serpent of eternity".

=== Folk traditions ===
In South India, termite hills are believed to be the dwelling place of female nagammas, whereas Himalayan Nags and Naginis, such as Naiṇī Devī of Pindar Valley, are worshipped as underworld beings protecting water resources and the wellbeing of village and valley.

=== Literature ===
The Mahabharata epic is the first text that introduces nāgas; it describes them in detail and narrates their stories. The cosmic snake Shesha, the nagarajas (nāga kings) Vasuki, Takshaka, Airavata and Karkotaka, and the princess Ulupi, are all depicted in the Mahabharata.

The Brahma Purana describes the reign of Adishesha as the king of the serpents in Patala:

During the night the light of the moon is not utilised for its coolness but only for illumination.

Since that passes away is not taken notice of by the nāgas who enjoy with gaiety the foodstuffs and the edibles they consume and the great beverages they drink. Nor are Danujas and others aware of it.

O brahmins, the forests, rivers, lakes, and lotus ponds, the cooing of the cuckoo and other sweet birds, the pleasing skies, the unguents and the continuous notes and sounds of musical instruments such as the lute, flute and Mṛdaṅga drums, O brahmins—all these and other beautiful things are enjoyed by virtue of their good luck by Dānavas, Daityas and Nāgas residing in Pātāla. The Tāmasī form of Viṣṇu, named Śeṣa is beneath the lower regions.

Daityas and Dānavas are not capable of recounting his good qualities. He is honoured by Devas and celestial sages. He is spoken of as Ananta. He has a thousand hoods and he is clearly bedecked in Svastika ornaments devoid of impurities. He illuminates all quarters by thousand jewels on his hoods.

— Brahma Purana, Chapter 19

The Kamba Ramayana describes the role of Vasuki in the Samudra Manthana:

The devas and the asuras decided to get Amṛta (Ambrosia—the celestial honey of immortalily) by churning the sea of milk. The Devas went to bring Mandara-mountain, to be used as the churning rod. Their attempt was futile. The asuras made a trial with the same result. The Bhūtagaṇas (Guards) of Śiva also made a vain attempt. On the instruction of Viṣṇu, Garuḍa went and brought the mountain as easily as an eagle takes away a frog. Now Vāsuki should be brought. The Devas and Gandharvas failed in that attempt also. Garuḍa who was haughty of his strength and speed, went to the city of the nāgas (serpents) and requested Vāsuki to come to the sea of Milk. Vāsuki replied that if the matter was so urgent he had no objection for being carried to that place. He took the middle part of Vāsuki in his beak and flew up higher and higher and reached beyond the horizon. Still the lower half of Vāsuki was lying on the ground. So he took Vāsuki in his beak as folded in two. Still the result was the same. Garuḍa became aware of the impossibility of carrying Vāsuki and returned, ashamed and disappointed. Viṣṇu rebuked him for his arrogance. After this, Śiva stretched his hand to Pātāla. Vāsuki became a small bangle on that hand. Thus Vāsuki was brought to the shore of the sea of Milk.

— Kambar, Ramayana, Yuddha Kanda

The Devi Bhagavata Purana describes the legend of Manasa:

Manasā is the mind-born daughter of Maharṣi Kaśyapa; hence she is named Manasā; or it may be She who plays with the mind is Manasā. Or it may be She who meditates on God with her mind and gets rapture in Her meditation of God is named Manasā. She finds pleasure in Her Own Self, the great devotee of Viṣṇu, a Siddha Yoginī. For three Yugas She worshipped Śrī Kṛṣṇa and then She became a Siddha Yoginī. Śrī Kṛṣṇa, the Lord of the Gopīs, seeing the body of Manasā lean and thin due to austerities, or seeing her worn out like the Muni Jarat Kāru called her by the name of Jarat Kāru. Hence Her name has come also to be Jarat Kāru. Kṛṣṇa, the Ocean of Mercy, gave her out of kindness, Her desired boon; She worshipped Him and Śrī Kṛṣṇa also worshipped Her. Devī Manasā is known in the Heavens, in the abode of the Nāgas (serpents), in earth, in Brahmāloka, in all the worlds as of very fair colour, beautiful and charming. She is named Jagad Gaurī as she is of a very fair colour in the world. Her other name is Śaivī and she is the disciple of Śiva. She is named Vaiṣṇavī as she is greatly devoted to Viṣṇu. She saved the Nāgas in the Snake Sacrifice performed by Pariksit, she is named Nageśvarī and Nāga Bhaginī and She is capable to destroy the effects of poison. She is called Viṣahari. She got the Siddha yoga from Mahādeva; hence She is named Siddha Yoginī

— Devi Bhagavata Purana, Chapter 47

== Buddhism ==
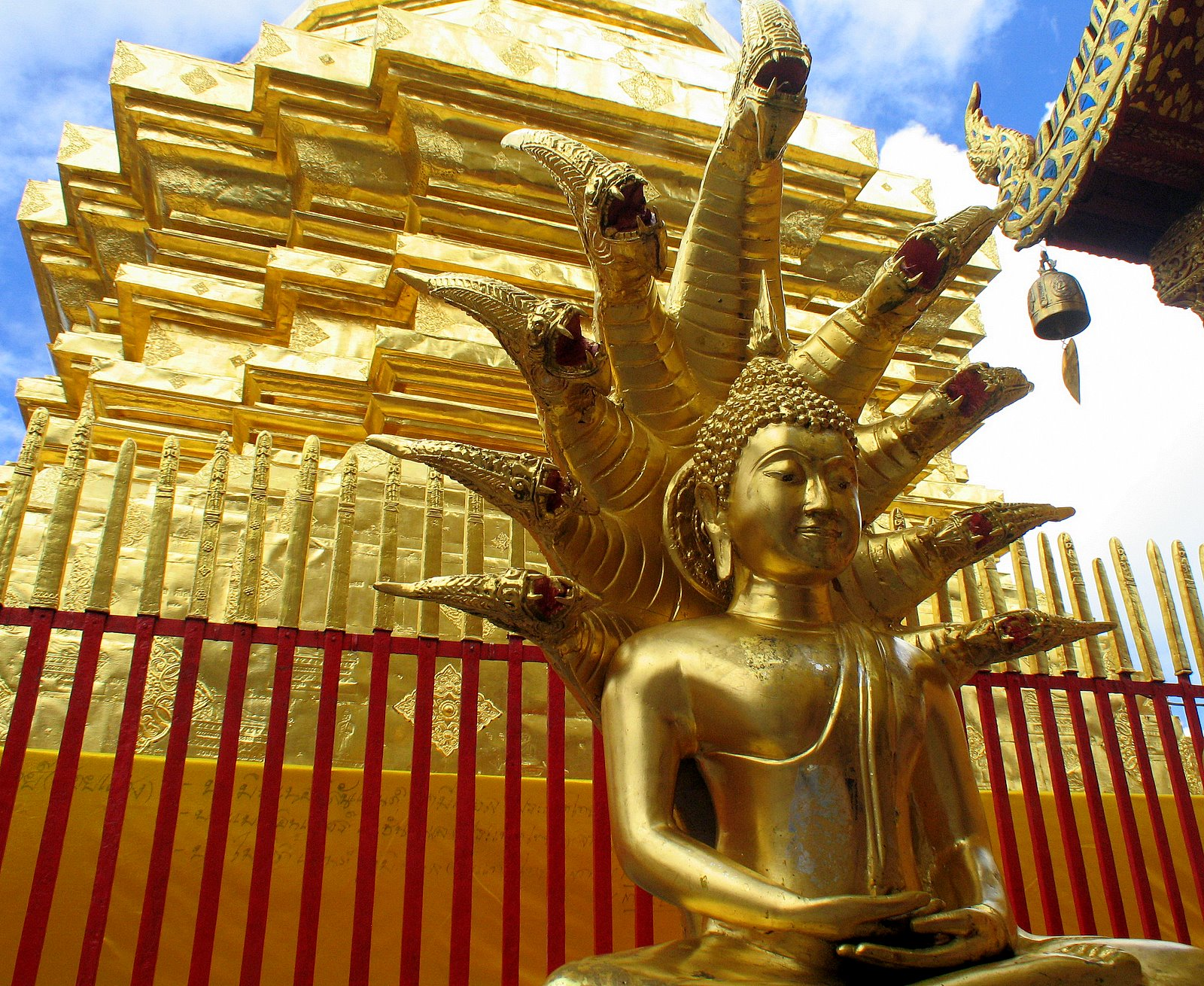
Mucalinda sheltering Gautama Buddha (Buddha in Naga Prok attitude) at Wat Phra That Doi Suthep in Chiang Mai, Thailand.

As in Hinduism, the Buddhist nāga generally has sometimes been portrayed as a human being with a snake or dragon extending over his head. One nāga, in human form, attempted to become a monk, and when telling it that such ordination was impossible, the Buddha told it how to ensure that it would be reborn a human, and so able to become a monk.

The nāgas are believed to both live on Nagaloka, among the other minor deities and in various parts of the human-inhabited earth. Some of them are water-dwellers, living in streams or the ocean; others are earth-dwellers, living in caverns.

The nāgas are the followers of Virūpākṣa (Pāli: Virūpakkha), one of the Four Heavenly Kings who guards the western direction. They act as guards upon Mount Sumeru, protecting the dēvas of Trāyastriṃśa from attacks by the asuras.

Among the notable nāgas of Buddhist tradition is Mucalinda, nagaraja and protector of the Buddha. In the Vinaya Sutra (I, 3), shortly after his enlightenment, the Buddha is meditating in a forest when a great storm arises, but graciously, King Mucalinda gives shelter to the Buddha from the storm by covering the Buddha's head with his seven snake heads. Then the king takes the form of a young Brahmin and renders the Buddha homage.

In the Vajrayāna and Mahāsiddha traditions, nāgas in their half-human form are depicted holding a nāgas-jewel, kumbhas of amrita, or a terma that had been elementally encoded by adepts. In Tibetan Buddhism, nāgas are known as klu or klu-mo and they are associated with water and cleanliness, as they live in oceans, rivers, lakes, and springs, and do not want their environments to be disturbed or polluted.

The two chief disciples of the Buddha, Sariputta and Moggallāna are both referred to as Mahānāga or "Great nāga". Some of the most important figures in Buddhist history symbolize nāgas in their names such as Dignāga, Nāgāsēna, and, although other etymons are assigned to his name, Nāgārjuna.

=== Literature ===
Nāga at the steps of a building in the Wat Phra Kaew in Bangkok.

The Nāga Saṃyutta of the Pali Canon consists of suttas specifically devoted to explaining nature of the nāgas.

In the "Devadatta" chapter of the Lotus Sutra, the daughter of the dragon king, an eight year old longnü (龍女, nāgakanyā), after listening to Mañjuśrī preach the Lotus Sutra, transforms into a male Bodhisattva and immediately reaches full enlightenment. Some say this tale appears to reinforce the viewpoint prevalent in Mahayana scriptures that a male body is required for Buddhahood, even if a being is so advanced in realization that they can magically transform their body at will and demonstrate the emptiness of the physical form itself. However, many schools of Buddhism and classical, seminal Chinese exegeses interpret the story to repudiate this viewpoint, stating the story demonstrates that women can attain Buddhahood in their current form.

According to tradition, the Prajñapāramita sutras had been given by the Buddha to a great nāga who guarded them in the sea, and were conferred upon Nāgārjuna later.

In Tibetan Buddhist literature, nāgas are portrayed as guardians or owners of submerged treasure, which can be mere wealth or supernatural, "spiritual" treasures.

== Other traditions ==
In Thailand and Java, the nāga is a wealthy underworld deity. For Malay sailors, nāgas are a type of dragon with many heads. In Laos they are beaked water serpents. In Tibet, they are said to be found in waterways and underground locations, and are susceptible to the suffering caused by human carelessness towards the natural environment.

=== Sri Lanka ===
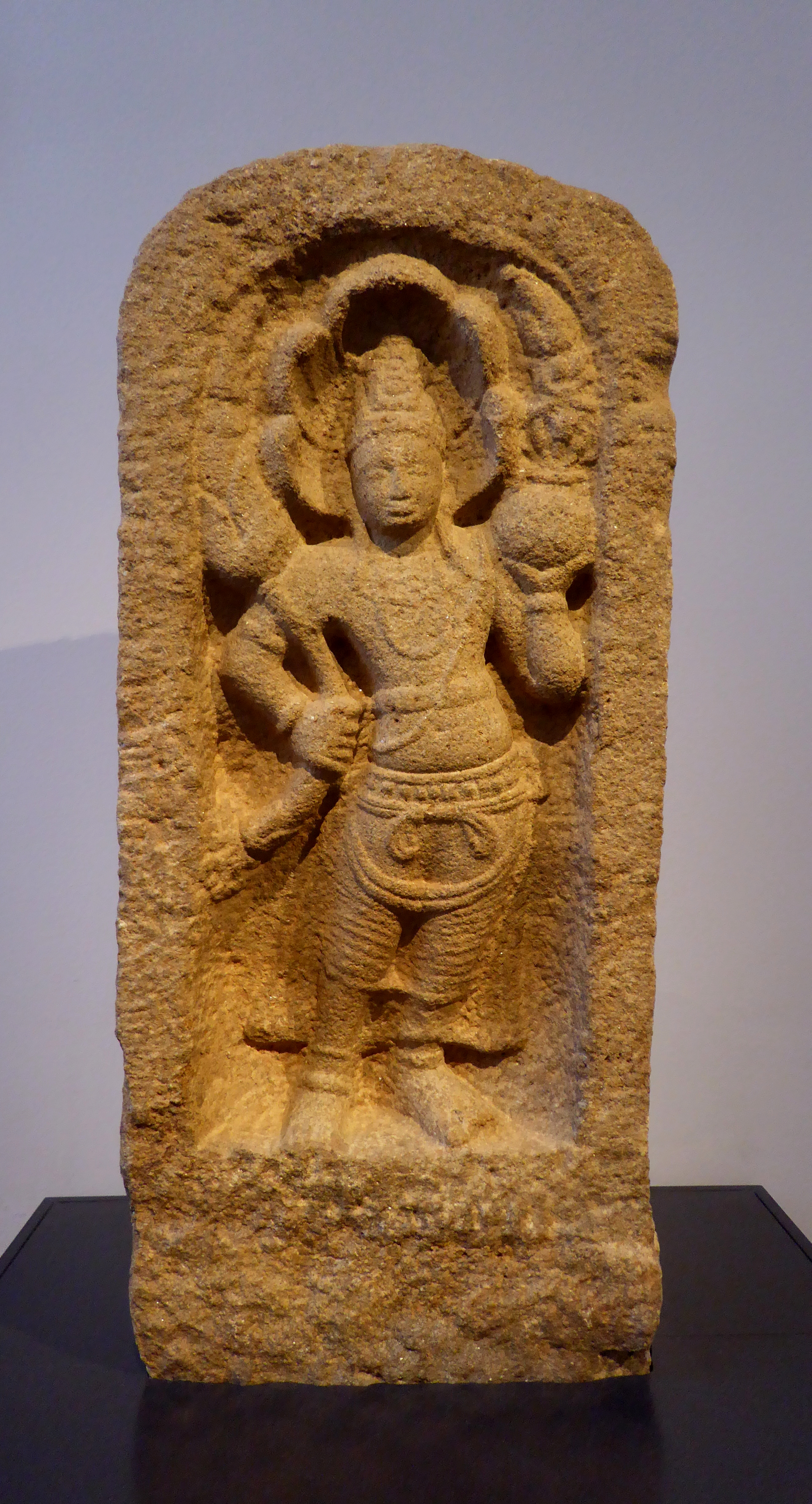
A granite nagaraja guardstone from Sri Lanka.

The Naga people were believed to be an ancient tribe and origins of Sri Lanka. (Note: Kathiragesu Indrapala writes that "In the traditions preserved in the early Sri Lankan chronicles as well as in the early Tamil literary works the Nagas appear as a distinct group". He further writes that "the adoption of the Tamil language was helping the Nagas in the Tamil chiefdoms to be assimilated into the major ethnic group there".) According to V. Kanakasabhai, the Oliyar, Parathavar, Maravar, and Eyinar, who were widespread across South India and North-East Sri Lanka, are all Naga tribes. There are references to them in several ancient texts such as Mahavamsa, Manimekalai, and also in other Sanskrit and Pali literature. They are generally represented as a class of superhumans taking the form of serpents who inhabit a subterranean world. Texts such as Manimekalai represent them as persons in human form. (Note: In the Mahavamsa as indeed in the ancient Sanskrit and Pali literature in general, the nāgas are never represented as human beings, but as a class of superhuman beings, who inhabited a subterranean world.)

=== Cambodia ===
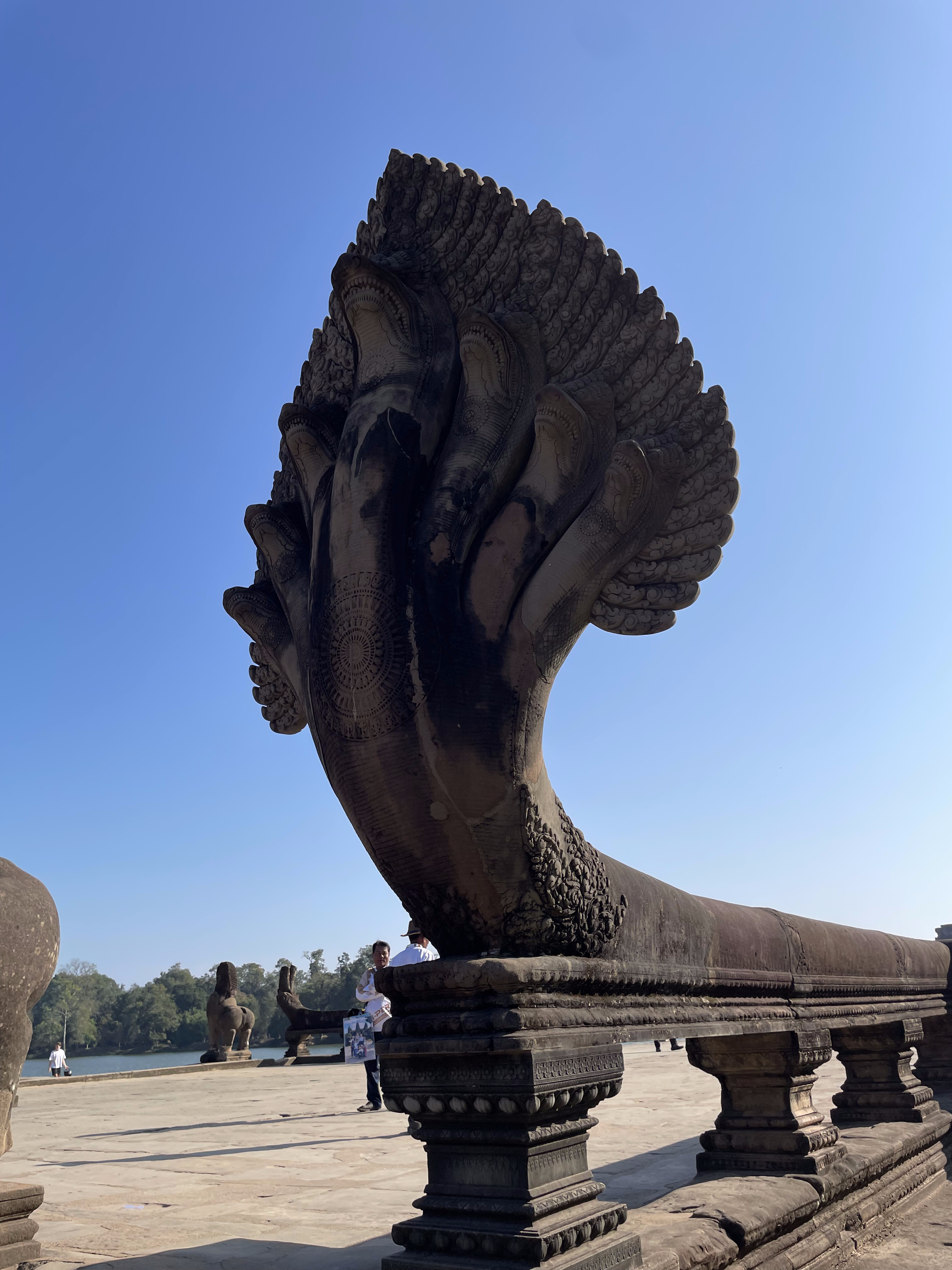
Nāga statue front of Angkor Wat in Siem Reap province.

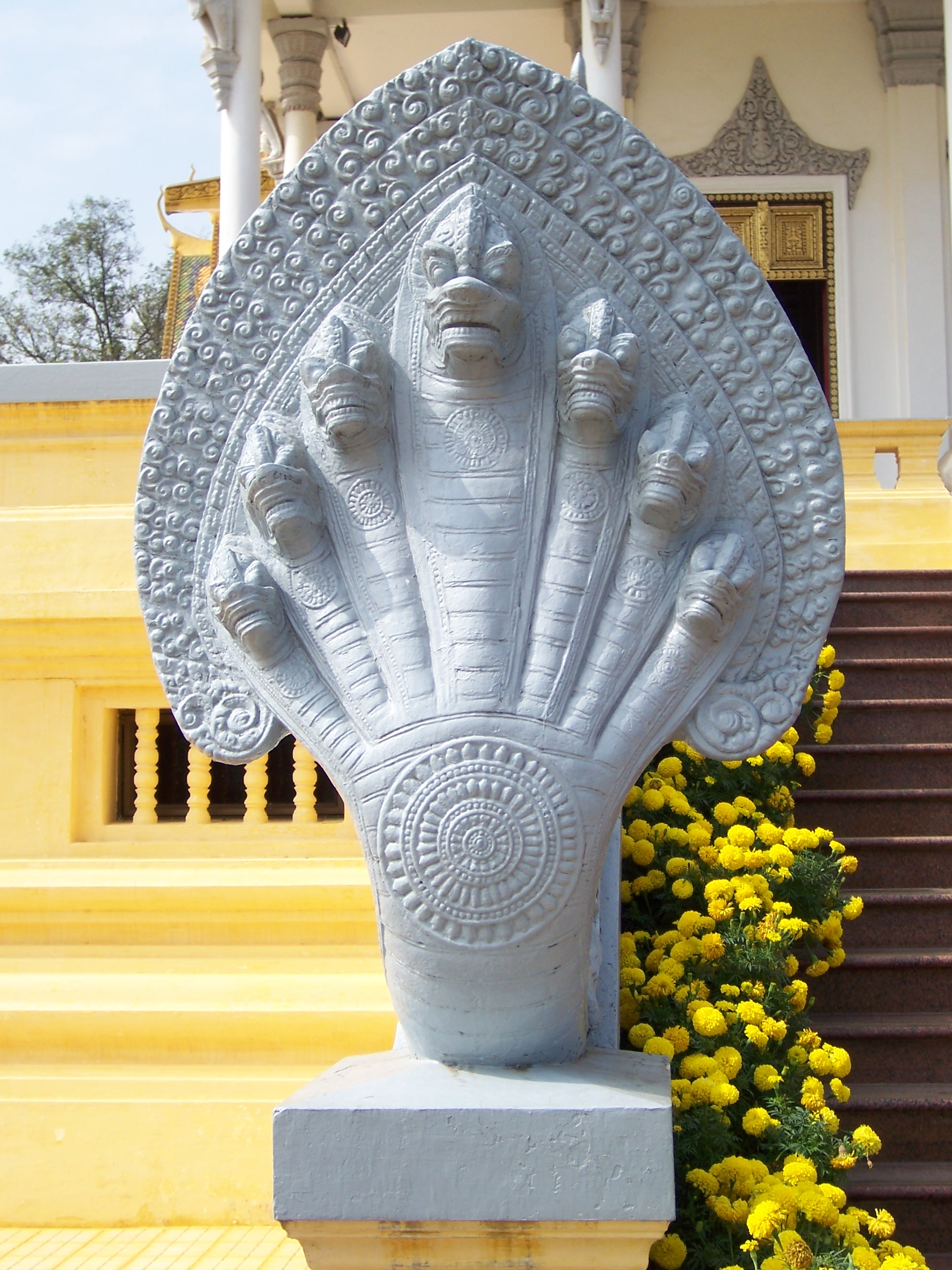
Cambodian seven-headed nāga at the Royal Palace in Phnom Penh.

Stories of nāgas (Khmer: នាគ, néak) have been part of Khmer society for thousands of years, dating back to the Funan era (នគរភ្នំ). According to reports from two Chinese envoys, Kang Tai and Zhu Ying, the state of Funan was established in the 1st century CE when an Indian prince named Kaundinya I (កៅណ្ឌិន្យទី១) married a nāga princess named Soma (សោមាកូនព្រះចន្ទ, saôma kon preah chan; "Soma, daughter of the moon god"; Chinese: 柳葉, 柳叶 Liuye; "Willow Leaf"). The couple is symbolized in the story of Preah Thong and Neang Neak.

As the legend goes, Kaundinya received instruction in a dream to take a magic bow from a temple and defeat Soma, the nāga princess and daughter of the nāga king. During the ensuing battle, they fell in love and later married, establishing the royal lineage of the Funan dynasty. According to the myth, Soma's father drank the ocean to reveal the land for his descendants to live on, which became the territory of ancient Cambodia. Kaundinya subsequently constructed the capital city of Vyadhapura, and the kingdom became known as Kambujadeśa or Cambodia (កម្ពុជា, Kampuchea).

The legend of the union between Kaundinya and Soma is the foundation for many standard practices in modern-day Khmer culture, including wedding ceremonies and other rituals. The Khmer people regard themselves as descendants of the nāgas and many still believe the nāga exist today, destined to one day return and restore prosperity to their people.

Although wars, nature, and the passage of time destroyed many temples from the Funan era, nāgas can still be seen in ancient temples dating to the Chenla and Angkor eras. For instance, the temple now called "The Coiled Nāgas Temple" (ប្រាសាទនាគព័ន្ធ, Prasat Neak Poan) was previously named "Emperor's Wealth Temple" (ប្រាសាទរាជ្យស្រី, Prasat Reach Srey).

In Khmer culture, nāgas symbolize rain, and represent a bridge between the mortal realm (ឋានមនុស្ស) and the realm of devas (Heaven; ឋានទេវតា/ឋានសួគ៌). Because they are water spirits, they govern fertility and are spiritually linked to the Tonlé Sap lake and Mekong river. They have the ability to transform into half or fully human and act as protectors against invisible forces, deities, or malicious intentions. Due to this protective nature, nāgas are heavily featured in Khmer architecture as railings flanking temple staircases, guarding sacred thresholds from evil. Furthermore, Cambodian nāgas possess numerological symbolism based on the number of their heads. Odd-headed nāgas embody masculinity, infinity, timelessness, and immortality, since all odd numbers derive from the number one (១). Even-headed nāgas denote femininity, physicality, mortality, temporality, and the Earth. Odd-headed nāgas are believed to represent immortality and are carved and used throughout Cambodia.

=== Odd-headed nāga ===
In Khmer architecture and broader Cambodian iconography, nāgas are strictly depicted with an odd number of heads, typically ranging from three, five, seven, to nine. In Southeast Asian Hindu-Buddhist numerology, odd numbers are generally associated with male energy, infinity, and the eternal divine, whereas even numbers represent temporality and the physical Earth. The nāga is viewed not as a creature of damnation, but as a semi-divine guardian of subterranean realms and a protector of water sources. According to foundational Khmer legends, the indigenous people trace their lineage to the mythic marriage of a Hindu warrior-prince named Kaundinya and a nāga princess named Soma.

Each odd-headed configuration carries specific mythological and religious connotations:

- 3-headed nāga: Found prominently in both Hindu and Buddhist temple carvings, the three heads possess deep symbolic significance, representing the past, present, and future, which reflects the eternal cycle of birth, death, and rebirth (samsara). In Hinduism, they can also represent the Trimurti of Brahma, Vishnu, and Shiva.
- 5-headed nāga: Heavily featured as decorations in ancient Khmer temples such as Khao Phanom Rung. In Hinduism, a massive five-headed snake sculpture often represents the serpent Shesha acting as a resting place for the deity Vishnu. In Buddhist cosmology, the five heads represent the five Buddhas of the current kalpa (eon): Krakucchanda, Kanakamuni, Kassapa, Gautama, and Maitreya.
- 7-headed nāga: This form is famously associated with Mucalinda, the powerful nāga king who emerged from the earth to shelter Gautama Buddha from a torrential storm during his meditation. In Khmer architecture, massive seven-headed nāga balustrades prominently line the causeways leading into Angkor Wat. These architectural serpents act as a symbolic rainbow bridge connecting the human world to the divine abode of the gods on Mount Meru. The balustrades also serve as a physical representation of the Hindu creation myth of the Churning of the Ocean of Milk.
- 9-headed nāga: A special manifestation often found guarding the highest, most sacred temples, representing the omnipotent power of the nine directions of the universe. According to the 13th-century accounts of Chinese diplomat Zhou Daguan, an old Khmer legend stated that a nine-headed nāga spirit lived at the top of the Golden Tower of the Phimeanakas temple in Angkor Thom. Every night, this nine-headed serpent would appear in the form of a beautiful woman, and the Khmer king was required to ascend the tower and unite with her to preserve his sovereignty and the fertility of the realm; if he failed to appear, it was believed disaster would ruin the kingdom.

=== Indonesia ===
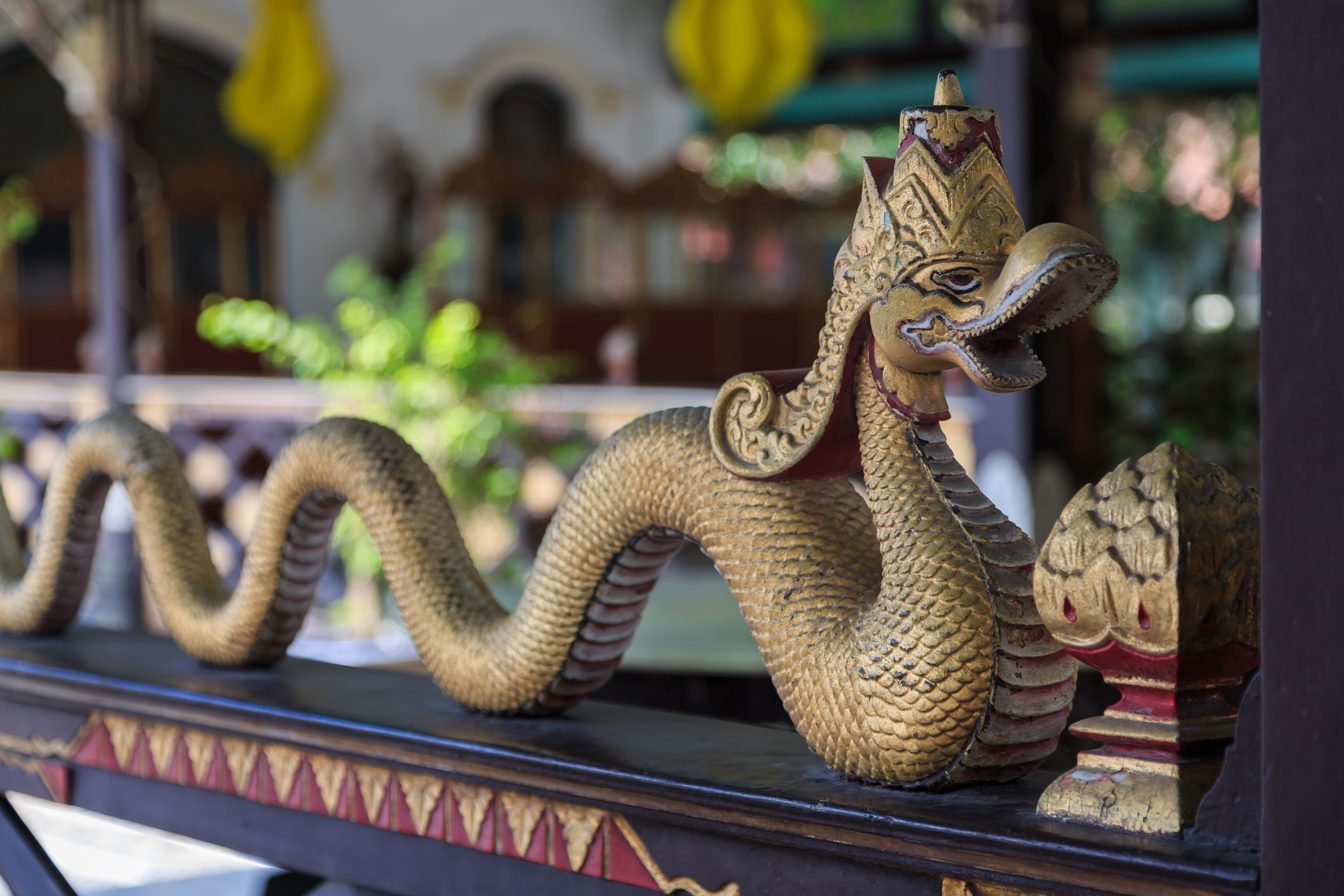
Crowned golden nāga-woodcarving at Keraton Yogyakarta, Java.

In Javanese, Sundanese, and Balinese culture, Indonesia, a nāga is depicted as a crowned, giant, magical serpent, sometimes winged. It is similarly derived from the Shiva-Hinduism tradition, merged with Javanese animism. The nāga in Indonesia mainly derived and influenced by Indic tradition, combined with the native animism tradition of sacred serpents. In Sanskrit, the term nāga literally means snake, but in Java it normally refer to serpent deity, associated with water and fertility. In Borobudur, the nāgas are depicted in their human form, but elsewhere they are depicted in animal shape.

Early depictions of circa-9th-century Central Java closely resembled Indic nāga which was based on imagery of cobras. During this period, nāga-serpents were depicted as giant cobras supporting the waterspout of yoni-lingam. The examples of nāga-sculpture can be found in several Javanese candis, including Prambanan, Sambisari, Ijo, and Jawi. In East Java, the Penataran temple complex contain a Candi Nāga, an unusual nāga-temple with its Hindu-Javanese caryatids holding corpulent nāgas aloft.

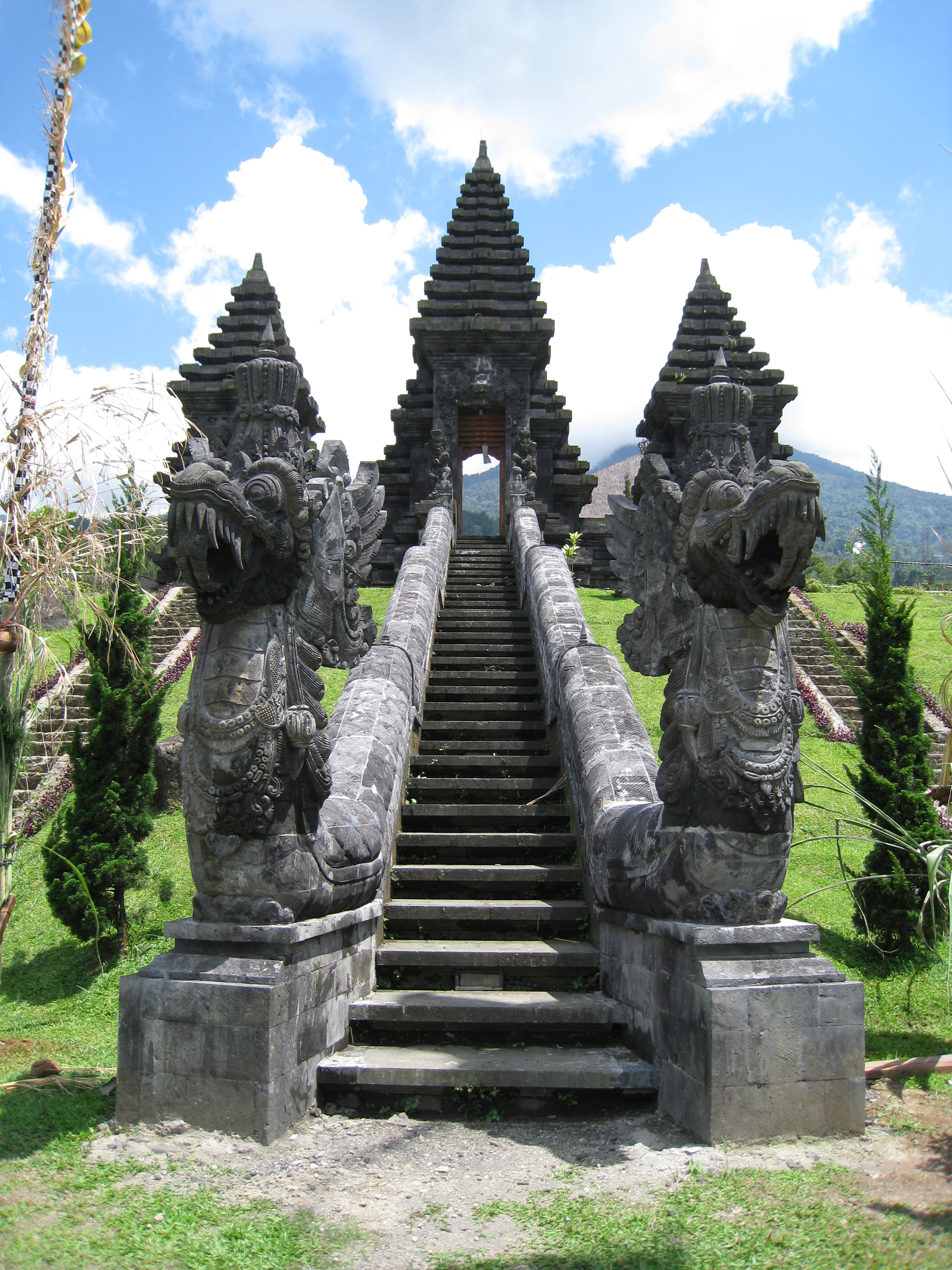
Crowned nāga flanking the entrance stairs to Pura Jagatkarta.

The later depiction since the 15th century, however, was slightly influenced by Chinese dragon imagery—although unlike its Chinese counterparts, Javanese and Balinese nāgas do not have legs. Nāga as the lesser deity of earth and water is prevalent in the Hindu period of Indonesia, before the introduction of Islam.

In Balinese tradition, nāgas are often depicted battling garuḍas. Intricately carved nāgas are found as stairs railings in bridges or stairs, such as those found in Balinese temples, Ubud monkey forest, and Taman Sari in Yogyakarta.

In a wayang theater story, a snake-like god (nāga) named Sanghyang Anantaboga or Antaboga is a guardian deity in the bowels of the earth. nāgas symbolize the nether realm of earth or underworld.

=== Laos ===
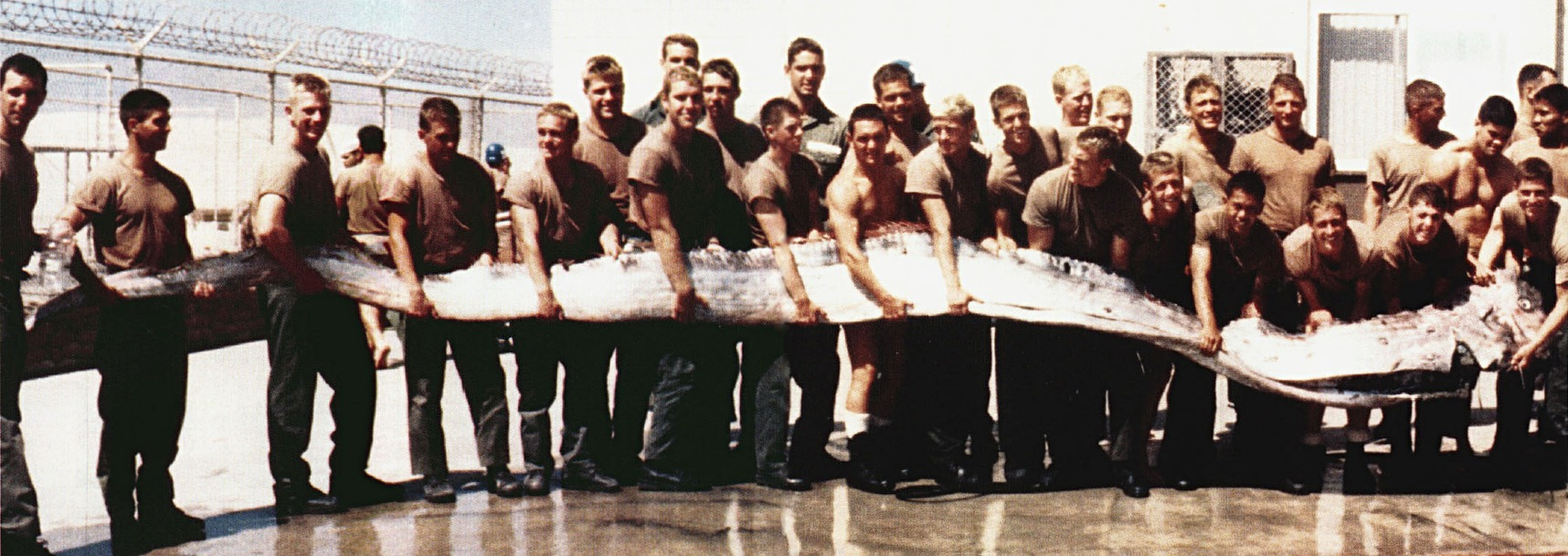
Photograph, widely circulated in Laos, purporting to show American sailors in the Vietnam War, who caught a "Mekong Dragon" in Laos. In reality, the image shows a Russell's oarfish (Regalecus russelii) caught near San Diego, California in 1996.

The Nāga (Lao: ພະຍານາກ) is believed to live in the Laotian stretch of the Mekong or its estuaries. Lao mythology maintains that the nāgas are the protectors of Vientiane, and by extension, the Lao state. The association with nāgas was most clearly articulated during and immediately after the reign of Anouvong. An important poem from this period San Leupphasun (Lao: ສານລຶພສູນ) discusses relations between Laos and Thailand in a veiled manner, using the Nāga and the Garuḍa to represent the Lao and the Thai, respectively. The Nāga is incorporated extensively into Lao iconography, and features prominently in Lao culture throughout the length of the country, not only in Vientiane.

=== Thailand ===
Phaya Nak or Phaya Nāga (Thai: พญานาค; RTGS: phaya nak; lit. 'lord of Nāga', phaya derived from Mon which mean high nobility) or Nakkharat (Thai: นาคราช; lit. 'king of Nāga') in Thai beliefs, nāgas are considered the patrons of water. Nāgas are believed to live in either water bodies or in caves. According to a popular legend, the Mekong River in north-eastern Thailand and Laos was said to be created by two Nāga kings slithering through the area, thus creating the Mekong and the nearby Nan River. The Mekong is synonymous with the unexplained fireballs phenomenon which has long been believed to be created by the nāgas that dwell in the river. Common explanations of their sightings have been attributed to oarfish, elongated fish with red crests; however, these are exclusively marine and usually live at great depths.

In November 2022, the Thai government declared the nāga as the national symbol of Thailand, with the aim of promoting Thai culture and traditions and increasing the country's cultural capital to drive the creative economy. The nāga is a mythical creature with long-standing beliefs and connections to the Thai people, and its designation as a national symbol is a significant step towards preserving and promoting Thai culture. The National Culture Commission and the Fine Arts Department developed a prototype image of the nāga that accurately represents Thai beliefs and traditions related to the creature. The prototype image features the four families of nāgas, each with its unique color, and the largest nāga, Nak Vasuki (Thai: นาควาสุกรี), who is related to Buddhism and the Thai monarchy, The nāga is also believed to be a symbol of water and fertility and serves as a guardian of Buddhism.

Due to the strong relation with everything water, the Nāga in Thai belief also plays a role in rain control. The concept of Nak hai nam (Thai: นาคให้น้ำ; lit. Nāga granting water) is used for annual rainfall prediction. It is still practiced nowadays, most notably during the Royal Ploughing Ceremony. The oracle ranges from 1 nak hai nam (1 Nāga granted water); meaning that abundant rainfall should be observed that year, to maximum 7 nak hai nam (7 nagas granted water); meaning there might not be adequate rainfall that year.

In northern Thailand, the Singhanavati Kingdom had a strong connection with nāgas. The kingdom was believed to be built with aids of nāgas, and thus, nāgas were highly revered by the royal family. The kingdom, for a period of time, was renamed Yonok Nāga Rāj (lit. Yonok the nagaraja)

The nāgas are also highly revered. The Buddhist temples and palaces are often adorned with various nāgas. The term Nāga is also present in various Thai architecture terms including the nak sadung (นาคสะดุ้ง, the outer roof finial component featuring Nāga-like structure), and the nak than (นาคทันต์, the corbel with Nāga-shape). Moreover, nāgas are sometimes linked to medicine. The nāga Vasuki is present in the legend of the Samudra Manthana, in which Dhanvantari (god of Ayurveda) and amrita (the elixir of eternal life) were churned from the Ocean of Milk. The nāgas can also be founded substituting the snakes in either Rod of Asclepius or mistakenly Caduceus of several medical institutions' symbols. The former seal of Faculty of Medicine, Srinakharinwirot University, and the seal of Society of Medical Student Thailand are some notable examples using the Caduceus with nagas' presence instead of snakes.

==== Folklore ====
Thai folklore holds the Phaya nāgas to be demi-god creatures, which possess supernatural powers as has been described in Buddhist and Hindu cosmology. The "Kamchanod Forest" (ป่าคำชะโนด; RTGS: Pa Khamchanot) Ban Dung district, Udon Thani province, which is held in high reverence and fear across Thailand, is believed to be the crossroads between the human world and the netherworld, and is frequently depicted in Thai folklore as the site of many hauntings, but more frequently is considered to be the home of the nāga.

According to Shan folklore of Nánzhào Kingdom (now southern China and Southeast Asia during the 8th and 9th centuries, which was centered on present-day Yúnnán in China), the nāga inhabited the Ěrhǎi lake and is the creator of the Mekong. In China, the nāga (Chinese: 那伽) is generally more considered to be a dragon.

==== Sightings ====
Many people, particularly in Isan (the north-eastern region of Thailand), believe that the nāgas are responsible for unnatural wave phenomena occurring in the rivers or lakes in the vicinity. It is also frequently claimed that the serpent-like demigods are responsible for marks on common objects, such as car hoods or house walls.

A police officer has also claimed to be in contact with the nāga, although the implications of this contact are not thoroughly explained.

In attempts to explain these phenomena, scientists and researchers at the Faculty of Science of Chulalongkorn University have attributed these seemingly preternatural phenomena to standing waves in water, and posit that the existence of the Phaya Nāga is similar to belief in Loch Ness Monster in Scotland or Ogopogo in Canada, and further maintain that the serpent-like tracks of the Phaya Nāga are very possibly forged by humans.

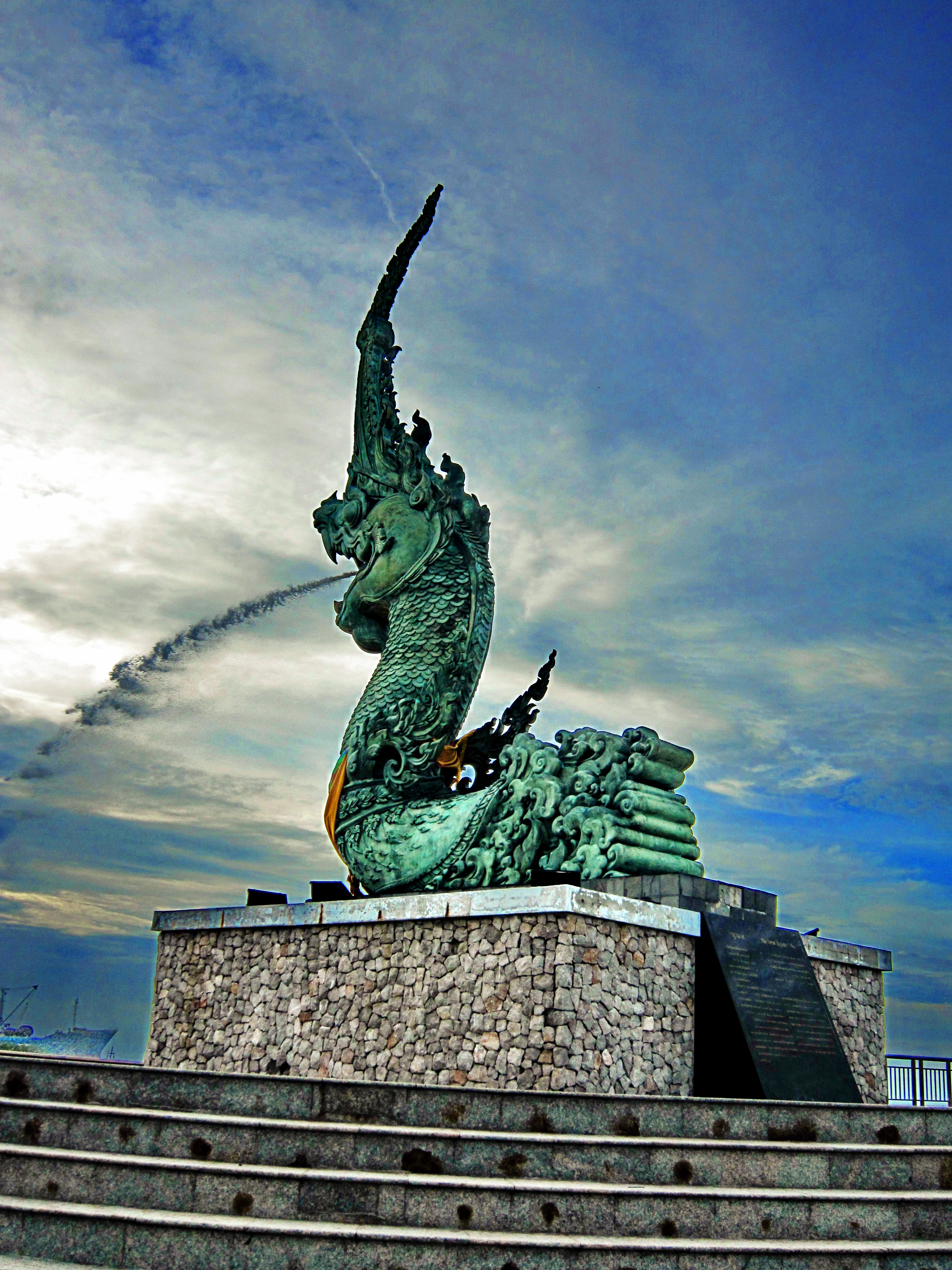
Head of Nāga sculpture in Songkhla Province.

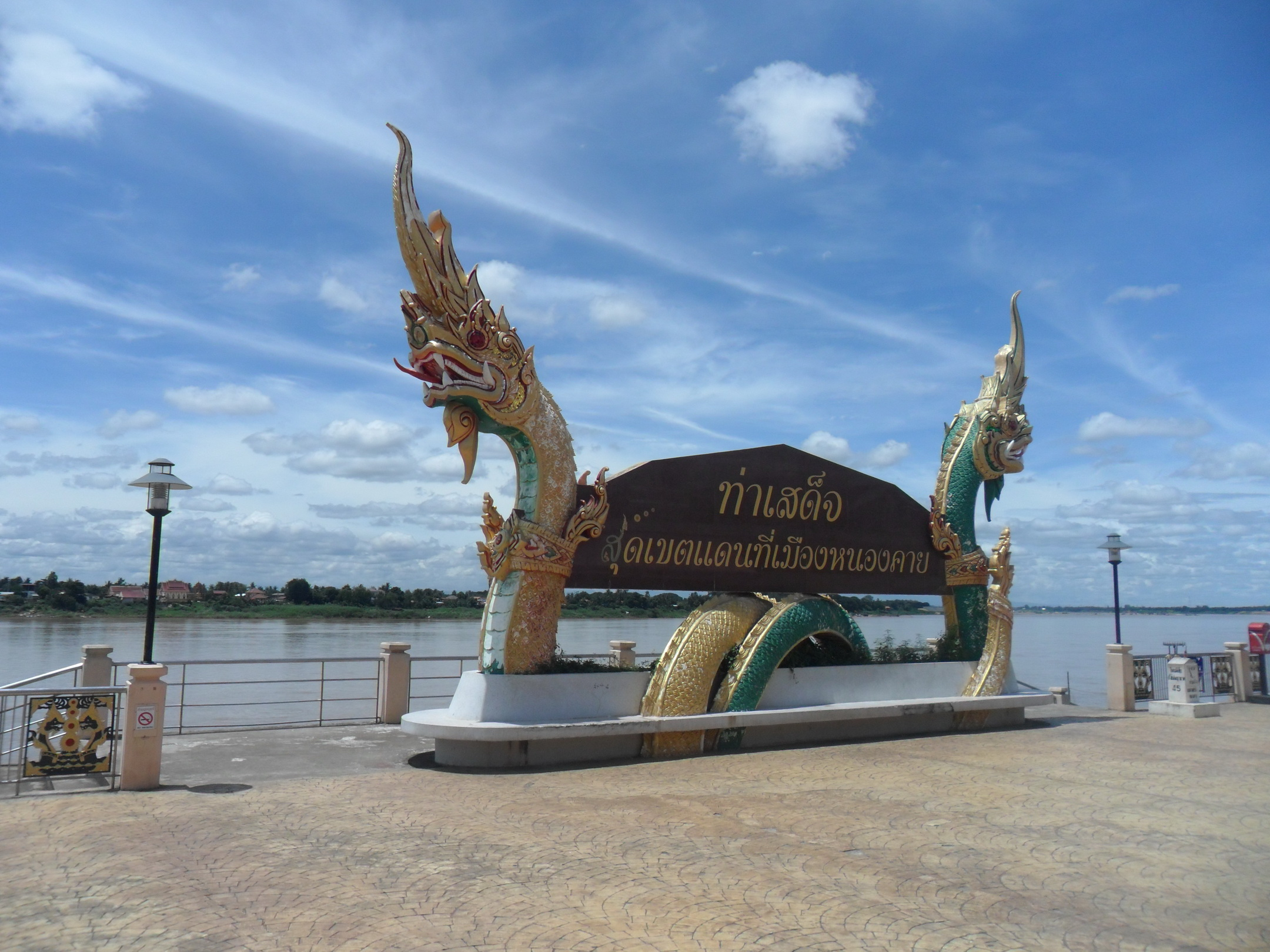
A sign featuring Nāgas by the Mekong River, Nong Khai Province, Thailand: Nāgas and the Mekong are strongly associated in local beliefs.

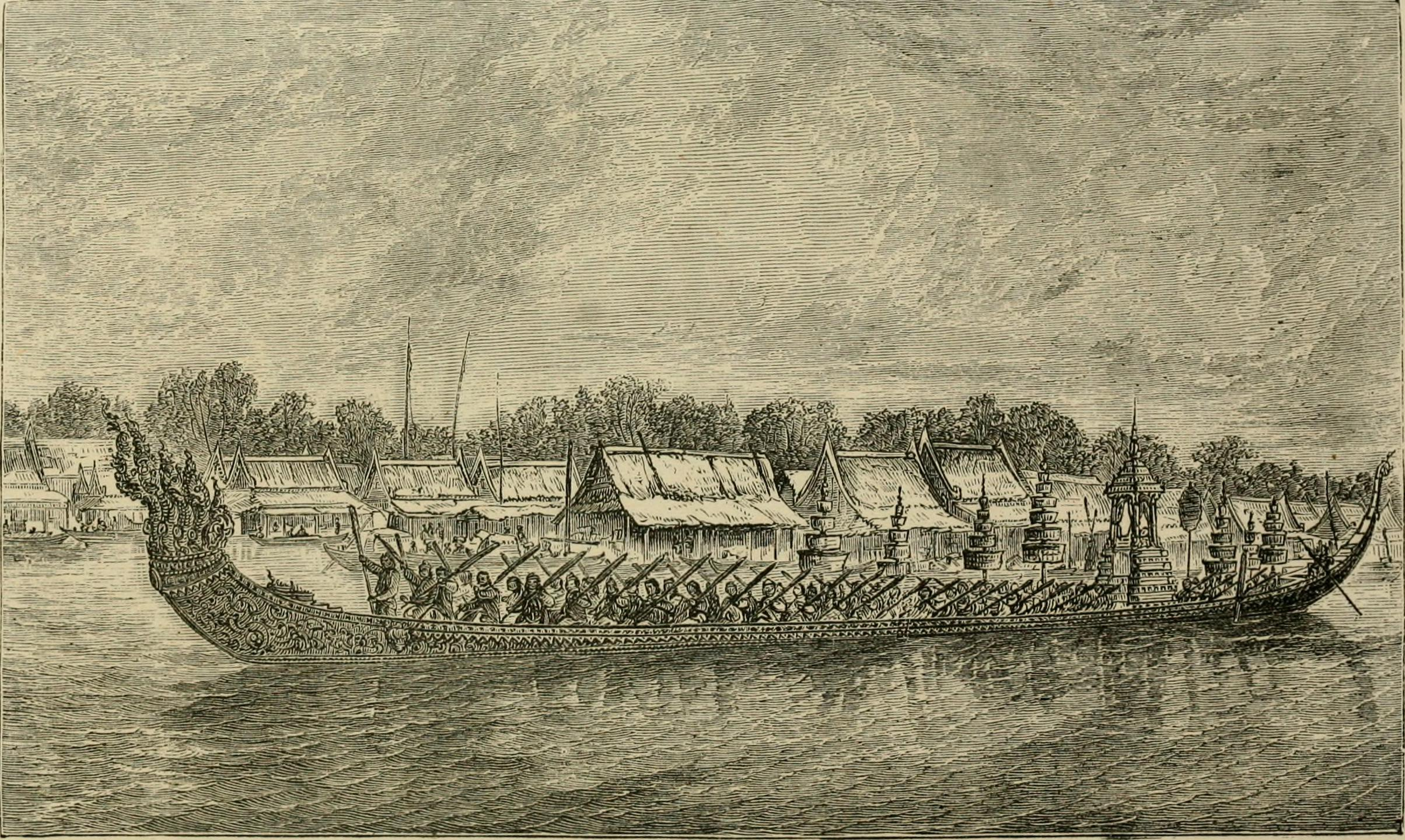
Illustration of Royal Barge Anantanakkharat, 1873.

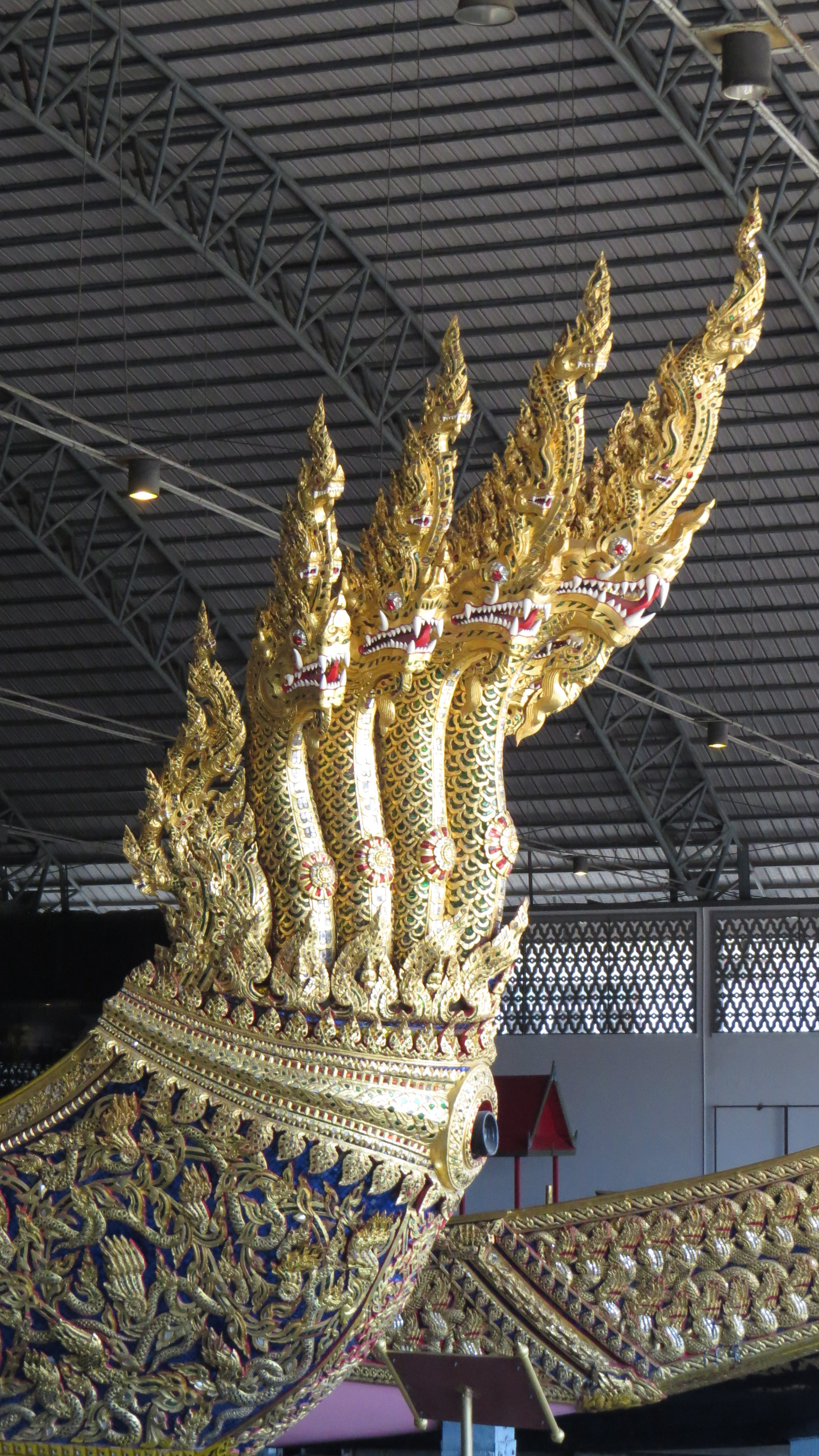
Royal Barge Anantanakkharat at National Museum of Royal Barges, Bangkok.

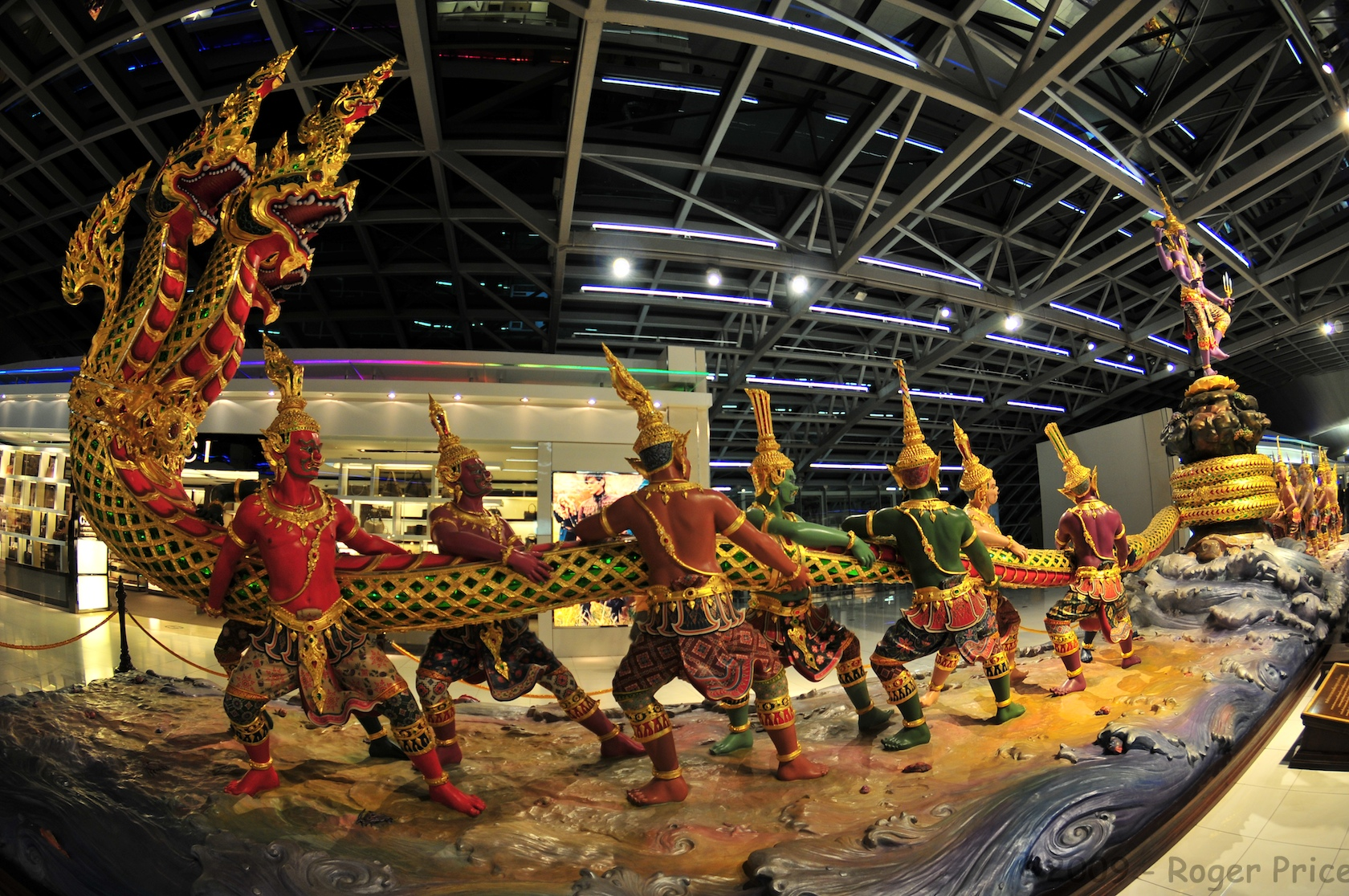
Nāga sculpture at Suvarnabhumi airport.

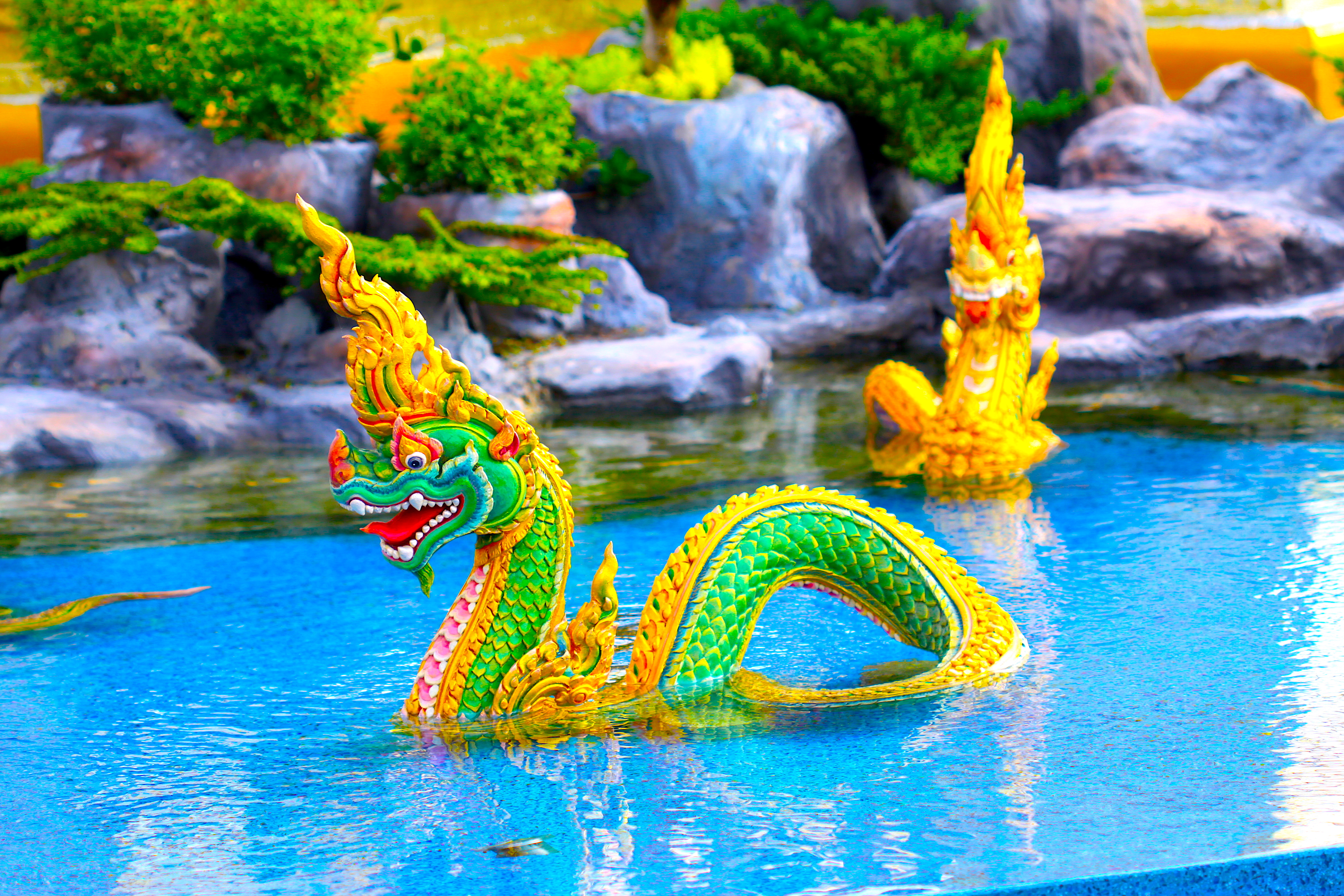
Nāga, Himmapan animal on Royal Crematorium King Rama IX.

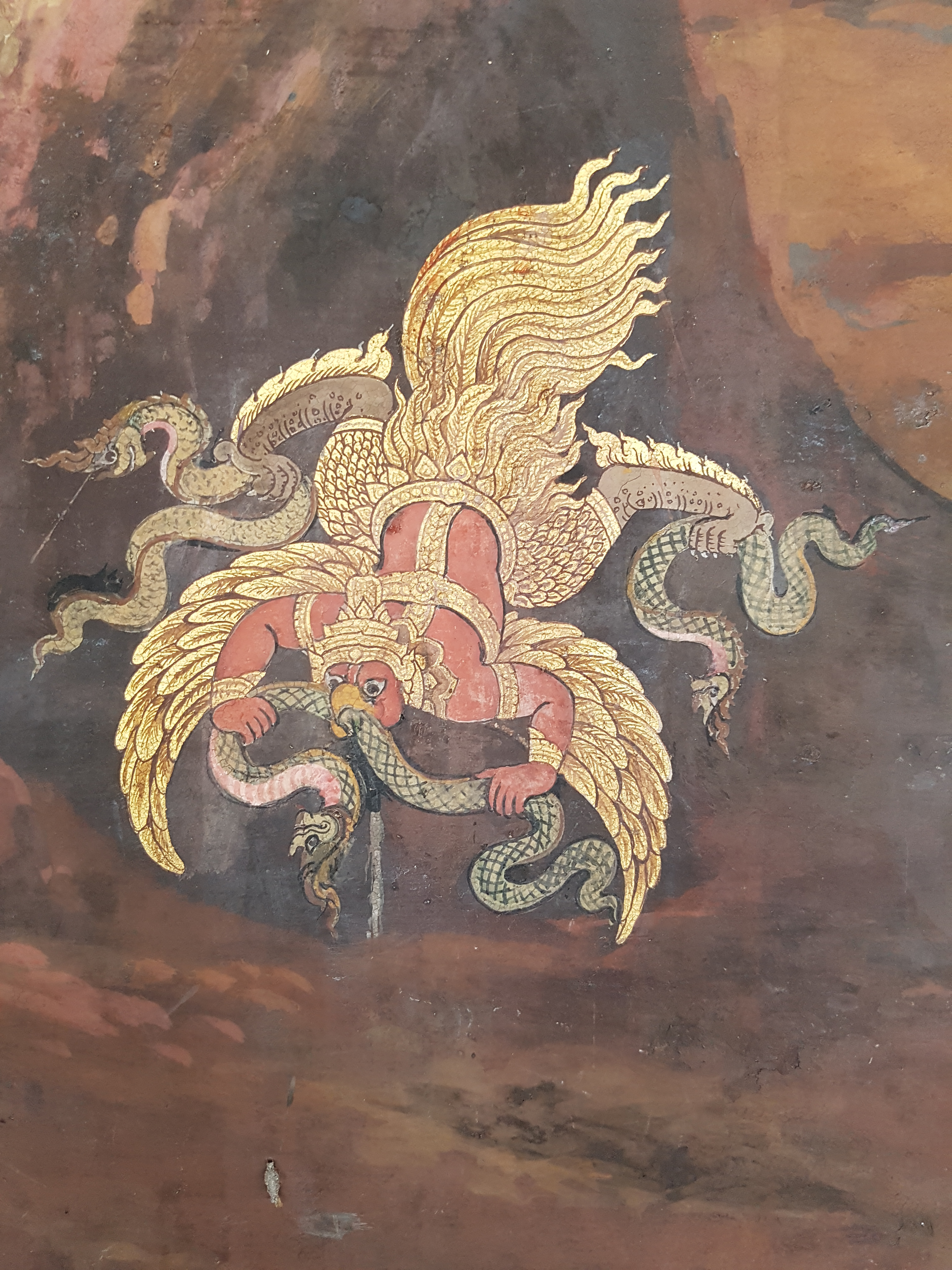
Garuḍa devouring Nāga, at Wat Phra Kaew.

=== Malaysia ===
In Malay and Orang Asli traditions, the lake Chini, located in Pahang is home to a nāga called Sri Gumum. Depending on legend versions, her predecessor Sri Pahang or her son left the lake and later fought a nāga called Sri Kemboja. Kemboja is the Malay name for Cambodia. Like the nāga-legends there, there are stories about an ancient empire in lake Chini, although the stories are not linked to the nāga-legends.

=== Philippines ===
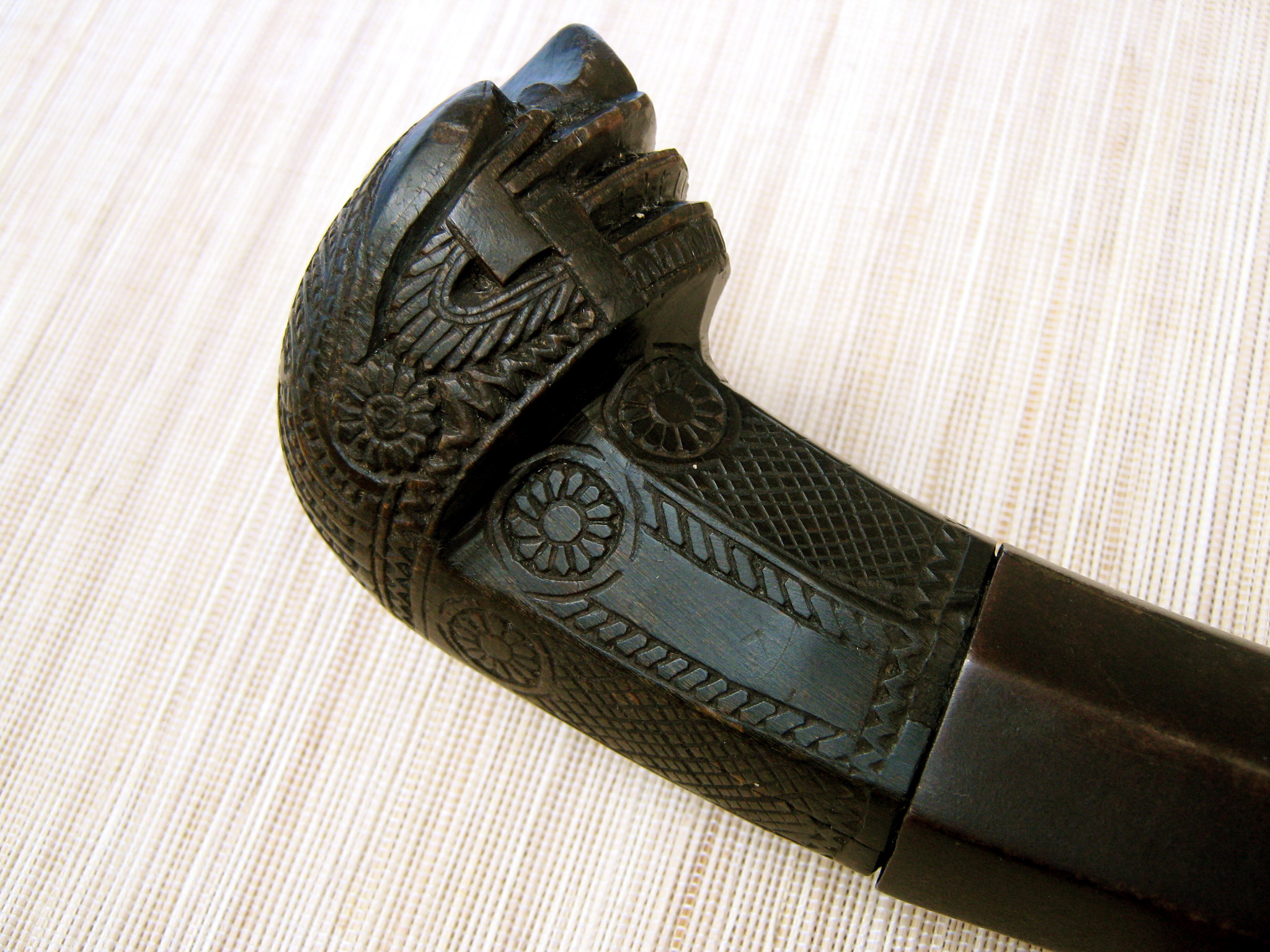
Bakunawa hilt from a Visayan (Panay) tenegre sword.

The indigenous Bakunawa, a serpent-like moon-eating creature in Philippine mythology, was syncretized with the nāga. It is believed to be the cause of eclipses, earthquakes, rains, and wind. The movements of the bakunawa served as a geomantic calendar system for ancient Filipinos and were part of the shamanistic rituals of the babaylan. It is usually depicted with a characteristically looped tail and was variously believed to inhabit either the sea, the sky, or the underworld. However, the bakunawa may have also syncretized with the Hindu deities, Rahu and Ketu, the navagraha of eclipses.

== Examples ==
- Shesha, on whom Vishnu is in yoga nidra (Anantashayana)
- Antaboga, the world serpent in Javanese and Balinese mythology of Indonesia, who created the World Turtle Bedawang, on whose back the world resides
- In Aceh, Indonesia there's a myth about a giant named Tuan Tapa who fought two gigantic nameless serpents who thought to be kidnapped a princess
- Apalala, Nāga in Buddhist mythology
- Bakunawa, a dragon in Philippine mythology that is often represented as a gigantic sea serpent. Nāgas are also present in Kapampangan polytheistic beliefs, such as Lakandanum. (See Deities of Philippine mythology.)
- Kaliya, a snake conquered by Krishna
- Karkotaka, a nāga king in Indian mythology who controls weather, that lived in a forest near Nishadha Kingdom and stung Nala at the request of Indra
- Longnü, a girl nāga who achieves instantaneous enlightenment, featured in the Lotus Sutra
- Paravataksha, his sword causes earthquakes and his roar caused thunder.
- Manasa, the Hindu goddess of nāgas and curer of snake-bite and sister of Vasuki
- Mucalinda, a nāga in Buddhism who protected the Gautama Buddha from the elements after his enlightenment
- Naga Seri Gumum, who lives in Tasik Chini, a freshwater lake in Pahang, Malaysia
- Padmavati, the Nāgī queen & companion of Dharanendra
- Shwe Nabay (Naga Medaw), a goddess or a Nat spirit in Burmese animistic mythology, who is believed to have married a nāga and died from heartbreak after he left her
- Takshaka, the king of the nāgas, and ruler of Khandava forest
- Ulupi, a wife of Arjuna in the epic Mahabharata
- Vasuki, the king of nāgas and who coils over Shiva's neck and offered to serve as the rope to pull Mount Mandara in the Samudra Manthana (Churning of the Ocean of Milk) to release the amrita (nectar of the immortality).
- Yulong, the Dragon King of the West Sea in the Chinese classical novel Journey to the West, becomes a nāga after completing his journey with Xuanzang

== In popular culture ==
=== Film and television ===
- A 4-headed Naga symbol and characters were part of the Leviathan story arc in the 1969 season of the gothic television soap opera Dark Shadows.
- Several Bollywood films have been made about female nāgas, including Nagin (1954), Nagin (1976), Nagina (1986), Nigahen (1989), Jaani Dushman: Ek Anokhi Kahani (2002), and Hisss (2010). Nāga also appear in television series such as Naaginn (2007–2009), Naagin (2015) and Adhuri Kahaani Hamari (2015–2016).
- In the 1998 film Jungle Boy, the Naga is depicted as a large cobra deity that grants the gift of understanding all languages to those who are pure of heart and punishes those who are not pure of heart in different ways.
- In the 1999 Telugu film Devi, a Nagini played by Prema comes to Earth to protect a woman who saves her when she was in the snake form. She eventually falls in love with a human.
- The Nagas are antagonists in the cartoon The Secret Saturdays. They served the ancient Sumerian cryptid Kur and attempted to push Zak Saturday into the dark side after learning that he was Kur reincarnated, but eventually served V. V. Argost when he gained his own Kur powers.
- Many lakorn (Thai television soap operas) are based on a Phaya Naga legend, such as Poot Mae Nam Khong (ภูติแม่น้ำโขง) in 2008, Manisawat (มณีสวาท) in 2013, or Nakee (นาคี) in 2016.
- A search for the Phaya Naga was featured in a Destination Truth episode on the SyFy (formerly Sci-Fi Channel) series in Series 01 (episode 02).
- The dragons in the 2021 film Raya and the Last Dragon are based on the Phaya Naga.
- A serpent god named Nāga is featured in the 2021 animated film Batman: Soul of the Dragon.
- They are featured Pakistani movies like Naag aur Nagin (2005).

=== Literature ===
- Nāga are featured in The Silent Bells, the fourth book in N. D. Wilson's Ashtown Burials series.
- The Japanese anime and manga series, Slayers (1989), has a principal character named Naga the Serpent (introduced in 1990).
- In J. K. Rowling's Wizarding World, Nagini is one of Voldemort's horcruxes in the Harry Potter series and a Maledictus, a carrier of blood curse, in the 2018 film Fantastic Beasts: The Crimes of Grindlewald. Her curse allows her to change into a snake and back into a human, but her snake form eventually becomes permanent.
- In the Xanth series by Piers Anthony, the Naga are a race of human-headed serpents that can transform between fully human and serpent forms, including any species and size of snake.
- In The God in the Bowl, one of the original Conan the Barbarian stories by Robert E. Howard, the titular God is possibly a Nāga-like creature.
- In Rudyard Kipling's story Rikki-Tikki-Tavi, the antagonists are two cobras named Nag and Nagaina.

=== Games ===
- "Naga" is name of a T1 battle cruiser in EVE Online. Shown as a long, thin hull, and used for long range attacks.
- Nagas appear in the Dungeons & Dragons roleplaying game, depicted as massive serpents with human heads.
- The Nagas appear in the multiple franchises by Blizzard Entertainment. In Warcraft, they are depicted as ancient night elves that have snake-like tails in place of legs, and have other serpentine or aquatic features such as scales and fins. The Nagas came to be when they were transformed from the ancient night elves by the Old Gods. Their queen Azshara is described as a demigoddess. The digital card game Hearthstone incorporated Naga as a minion type in its Battlegrounds game mode on 10 May 2022.
- Nagas also appear in The Battle for Wesnoth, and are depicted as a more snakelike counterpart to the merfolk, who are often their enemies.
- Magic: The Gathering's 2014–2015 block, set on the plane of Tarkir, featured Naga as humanoid snakes versed in powerful venoms and poisons with two arms and no other appendages. They are aligned with the Sultai clan in the sets, Khans of Tarkir and Fate Reforged, and with the Silumgar clan in the Dragons of Tarkir set.
- Nagas are units in Heroes of Might and Magic III and its sequel, Heroes of Might and Magic IV.
- Gigabash features Rawa, a bipedal Phaya Naga inspired kaiju among its playable cast of creatures.

== Gallery ==
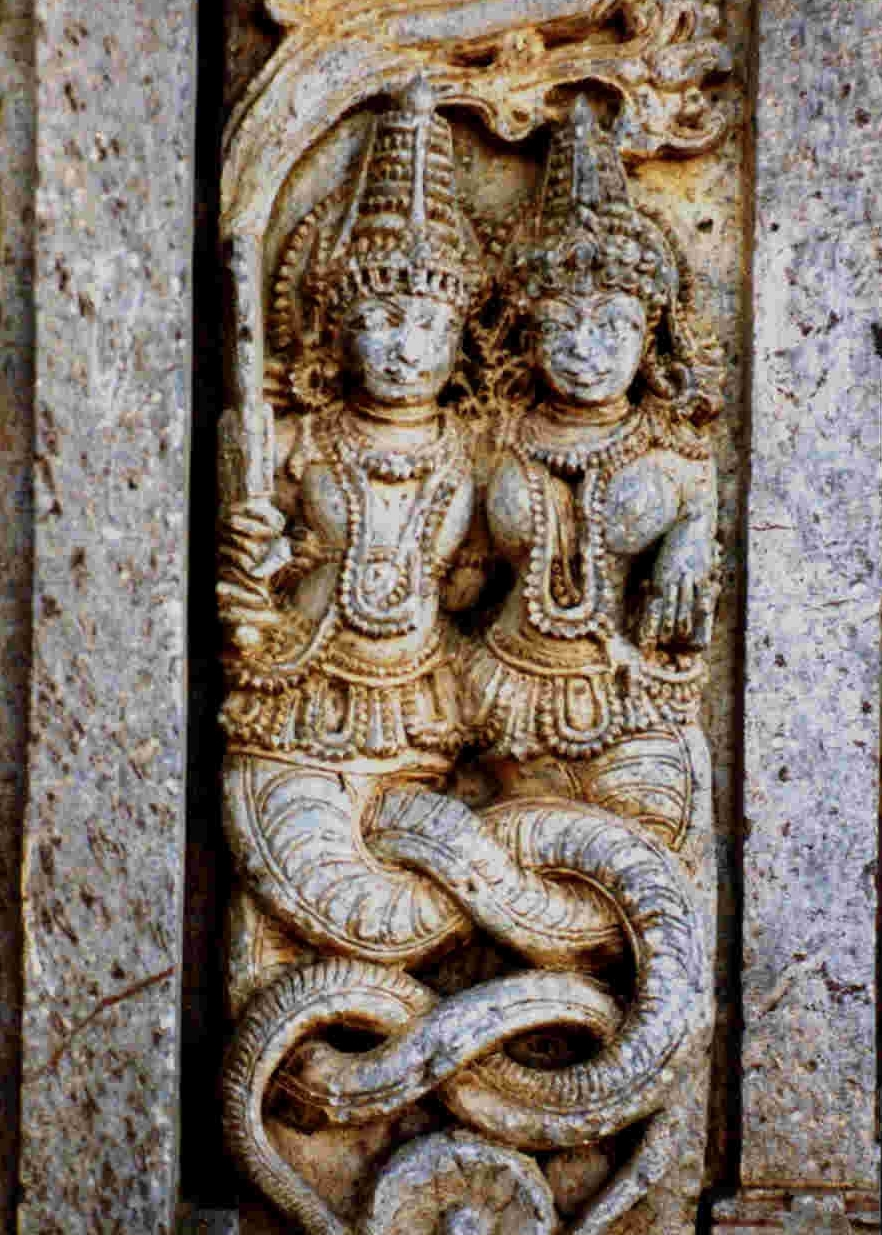
Nāga and Nagini in Bhubaneswar, Odisha, India

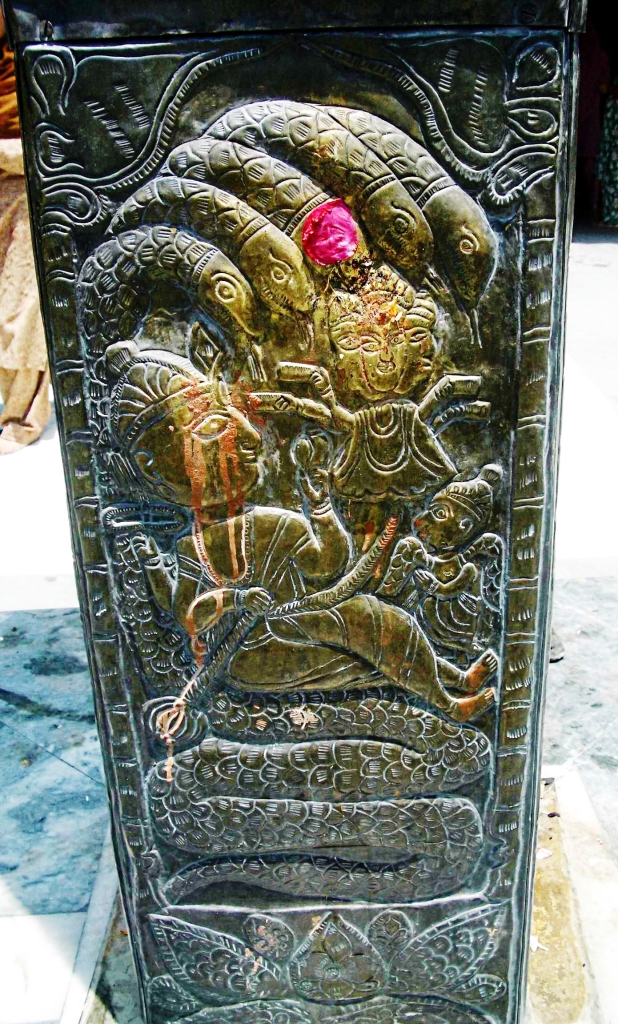
Nāga serving as Vishnu's bed on copper pillar in Kullu, Himachal Pradesh, India

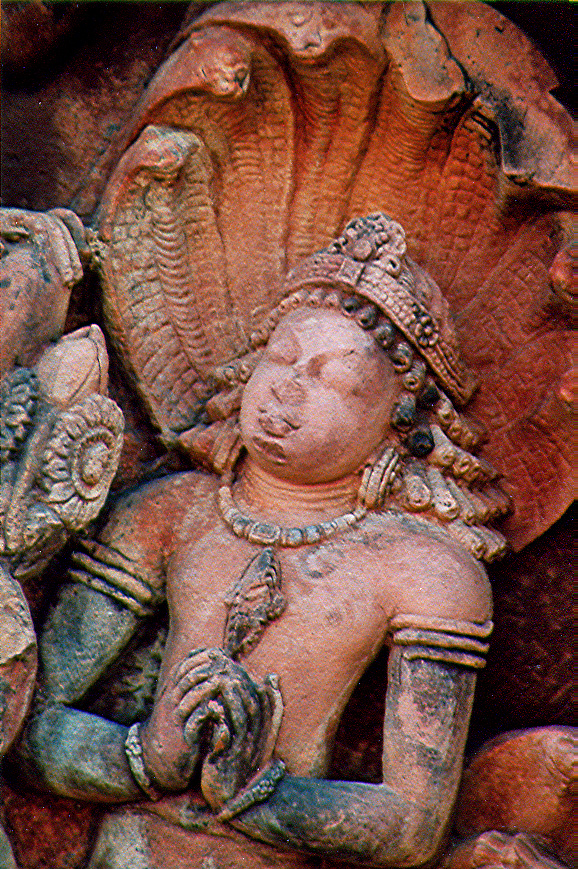
Nāga king in Anjali mudra in Deogarh temple, Madhya Pradesh, India

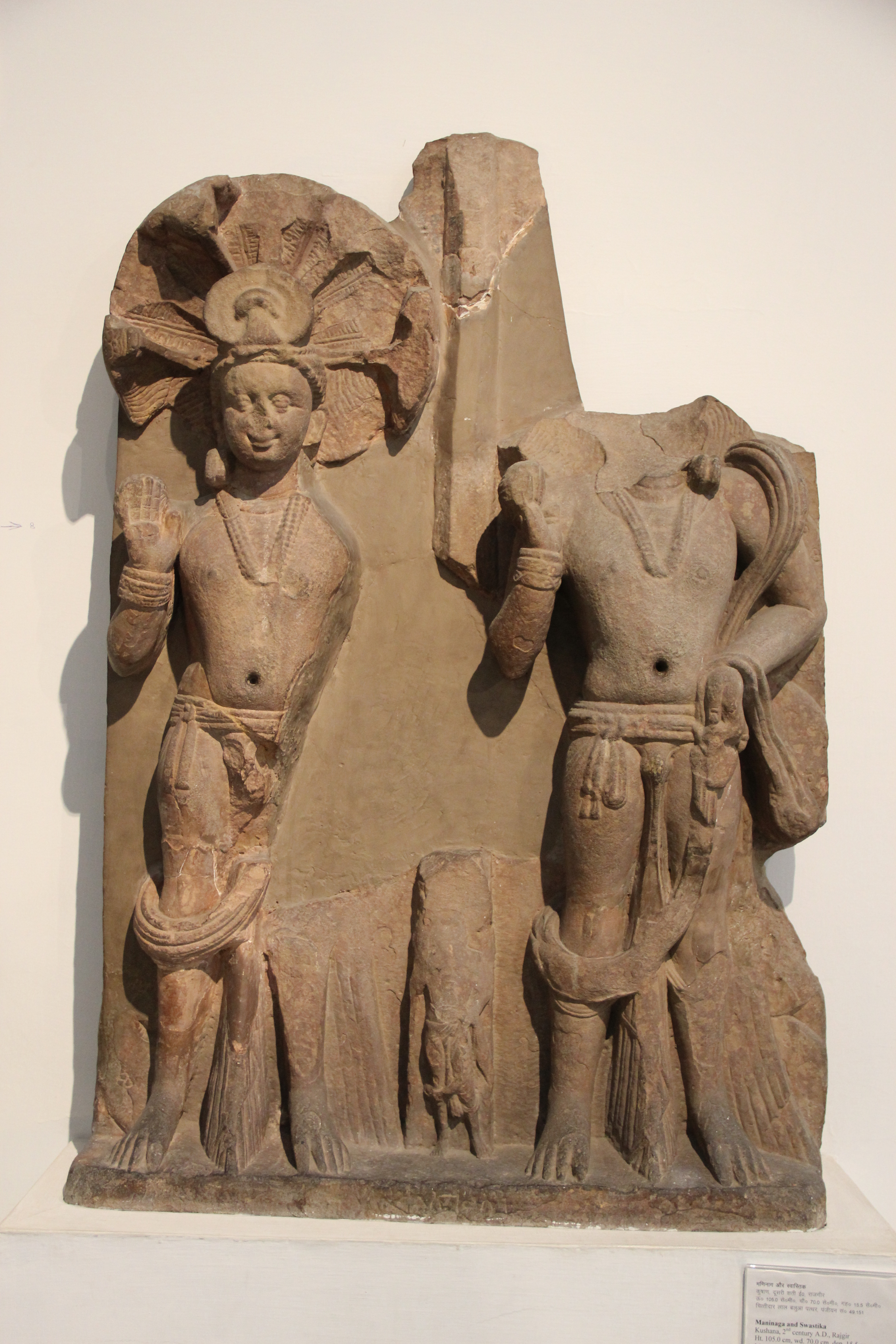
Maninaga and Svastika. Kushan period, 2nd century CE, Rajgir, Bihar, India

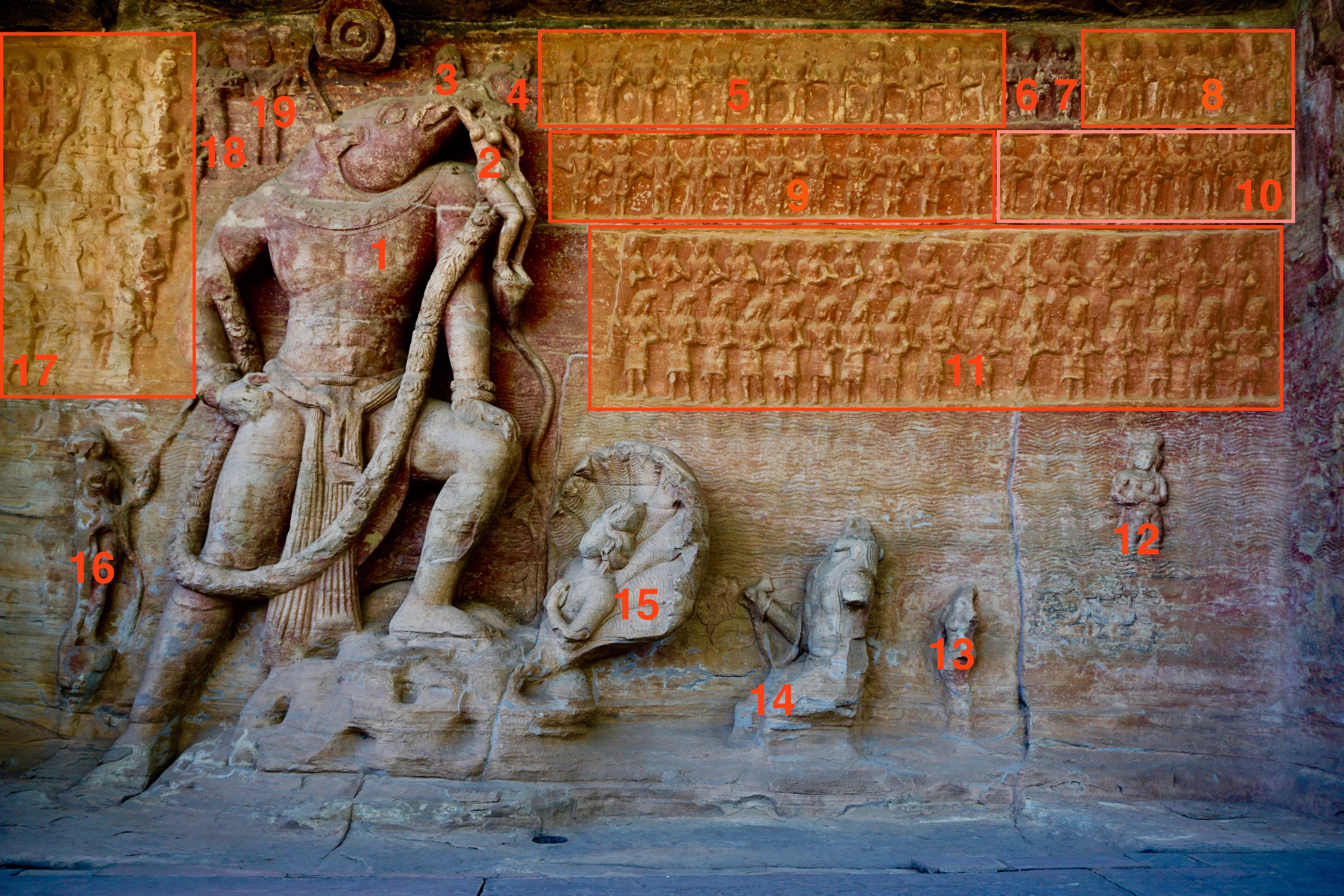
Nāga (marked 15) in the Varaha panel at Udayagiri Caves, Madhya Pradesh

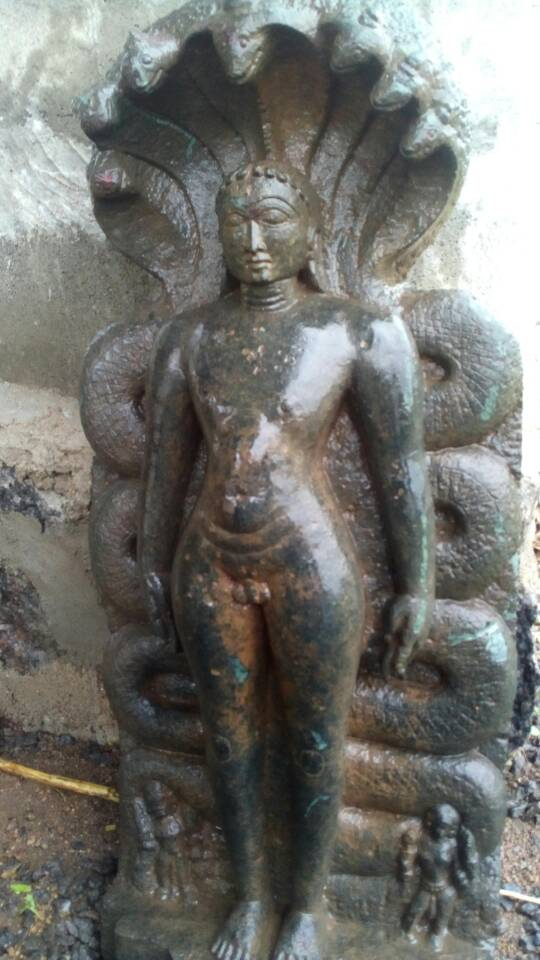
Tirthankara Parshvanatha of Jainism standing under Nāga hood

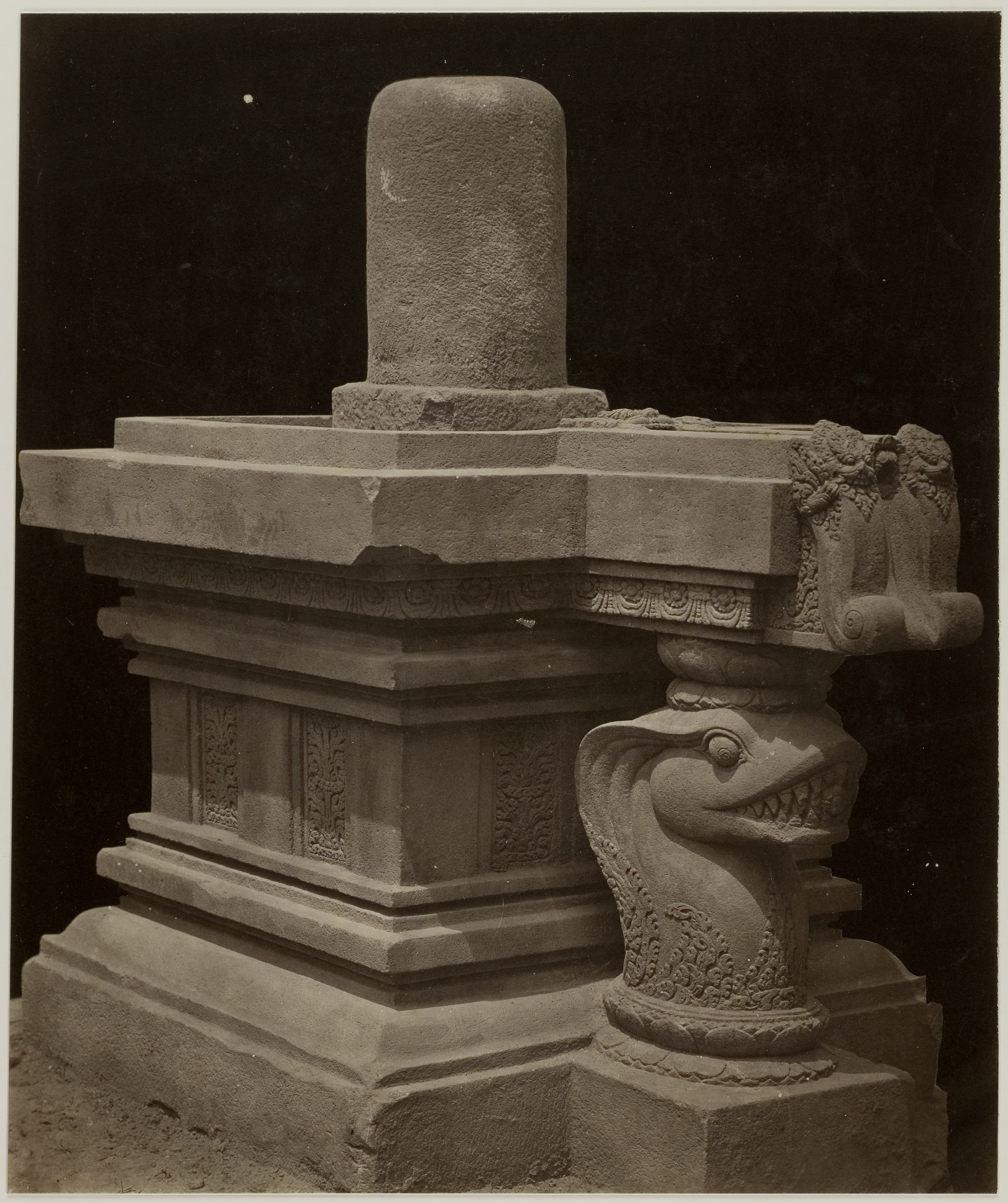
Nāga supporting waterspout of Yoni-Lingam, Yogyakarta Java, c. 9th century

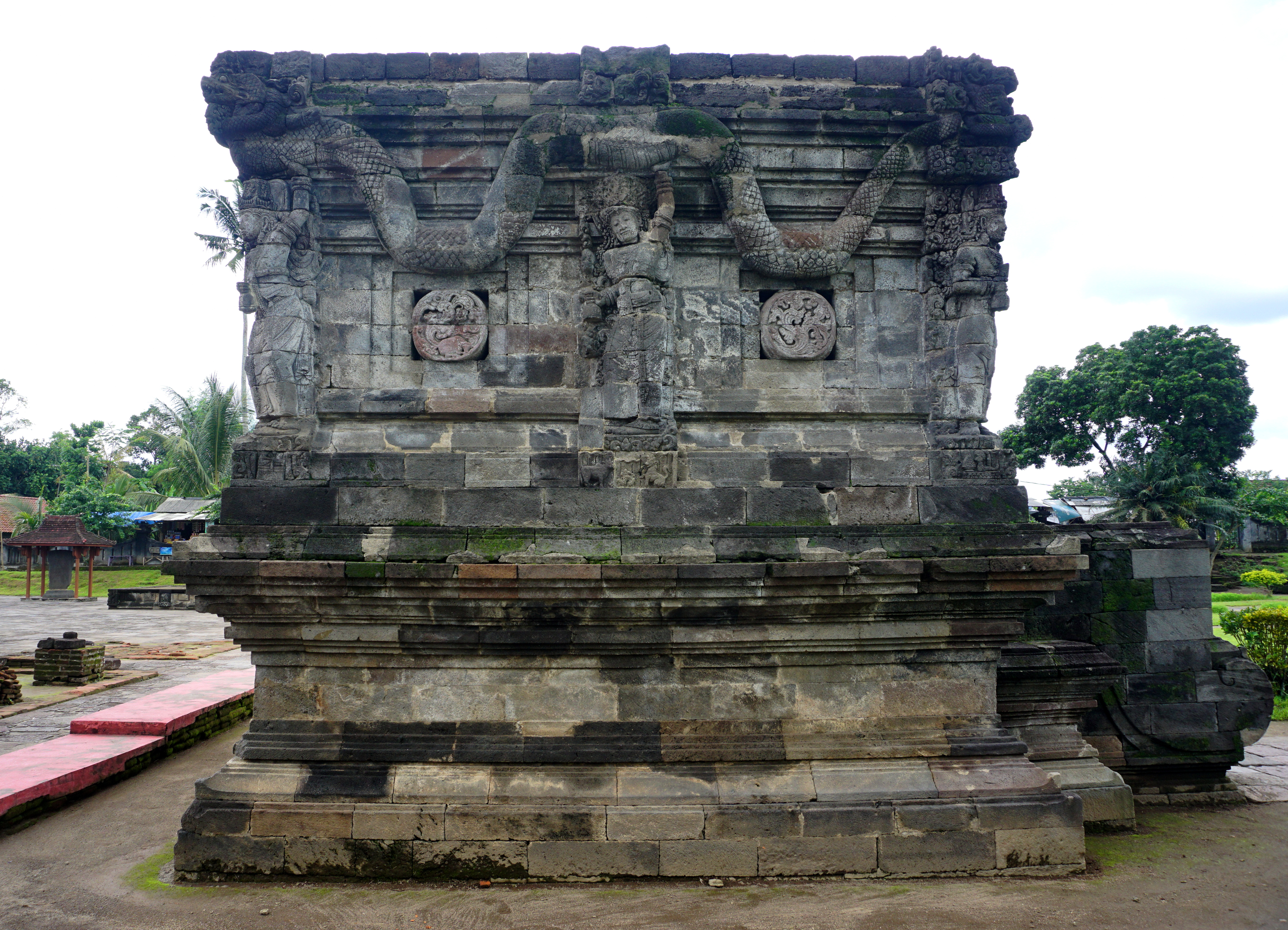
Nāga temple, Penataran, East Java

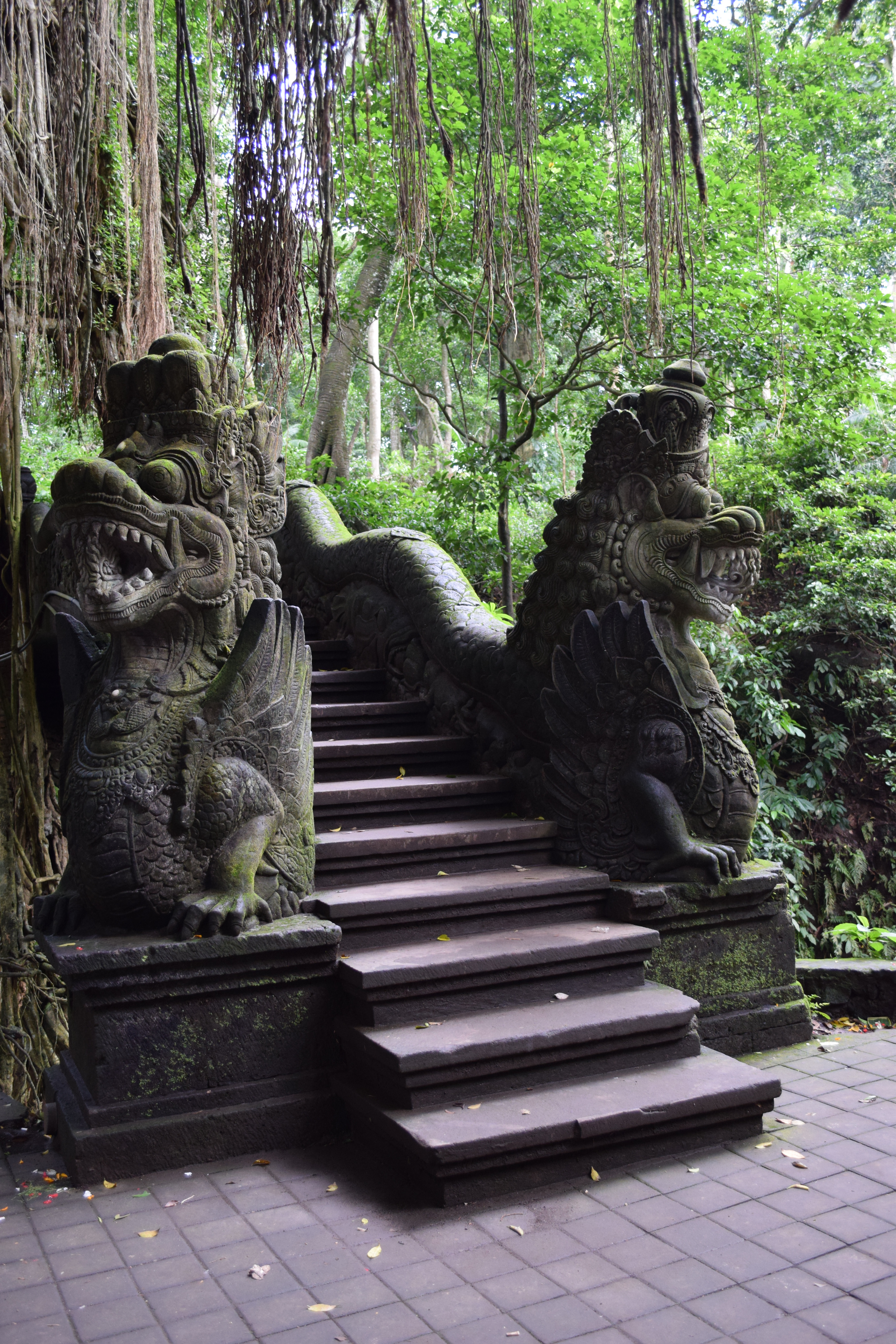
Nāga bridge at Ubud monkey forest, Bali

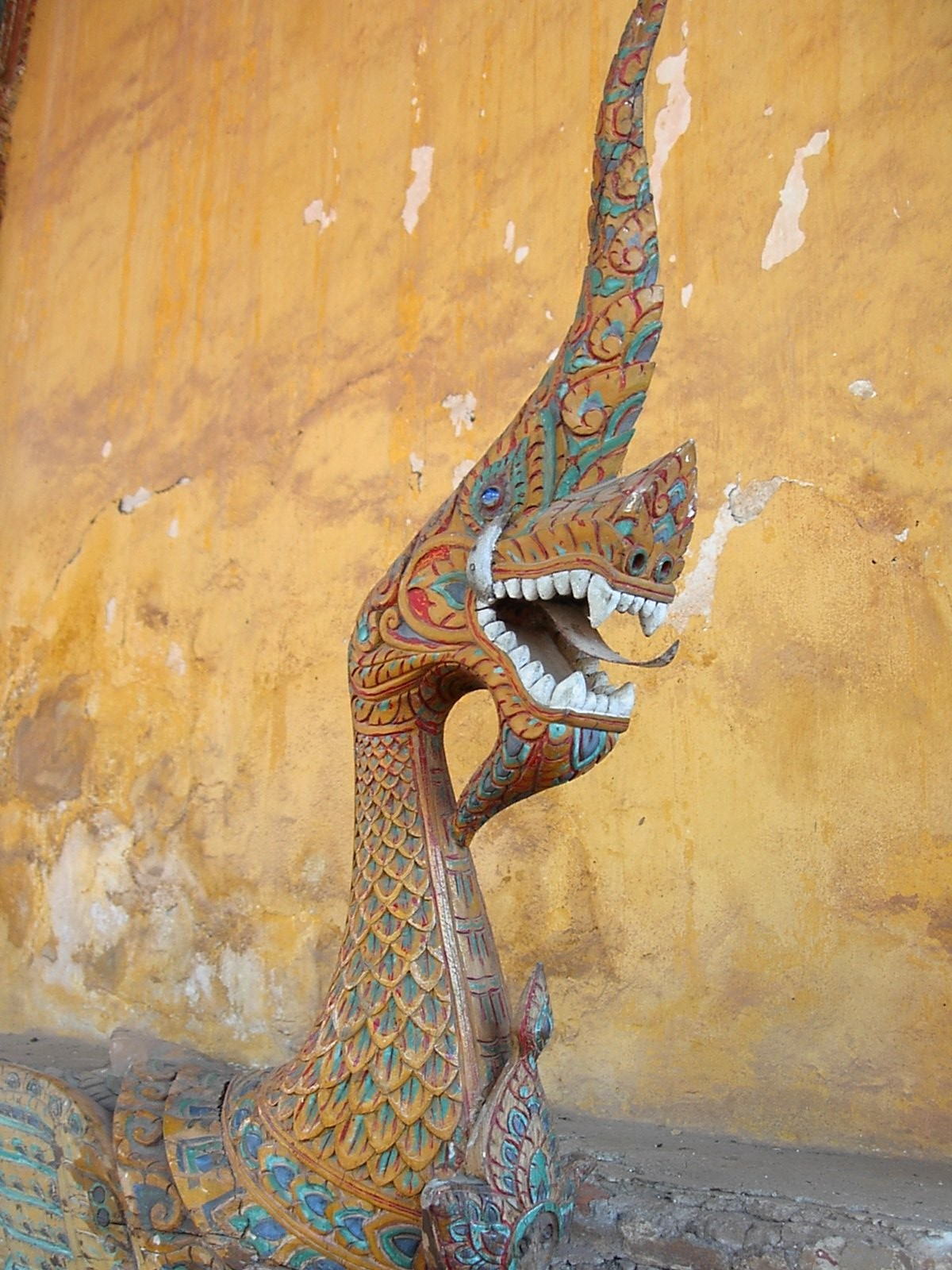
Nāga guarding Anouvong's Wat Sisaket in Vientiane

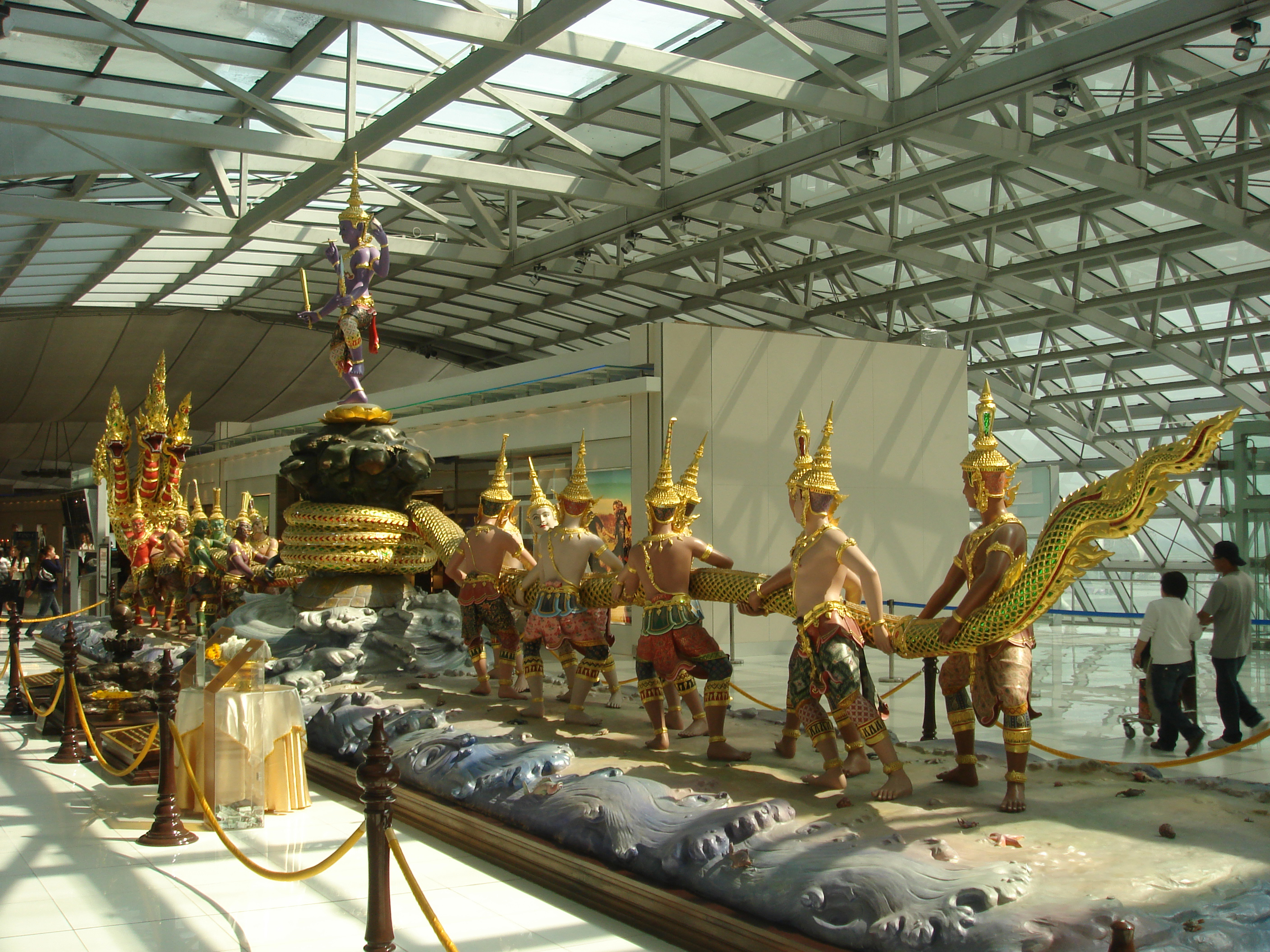
Sesa Nāga featuring at a scene of Samudramanthana at Bangkok international airport, Thailand

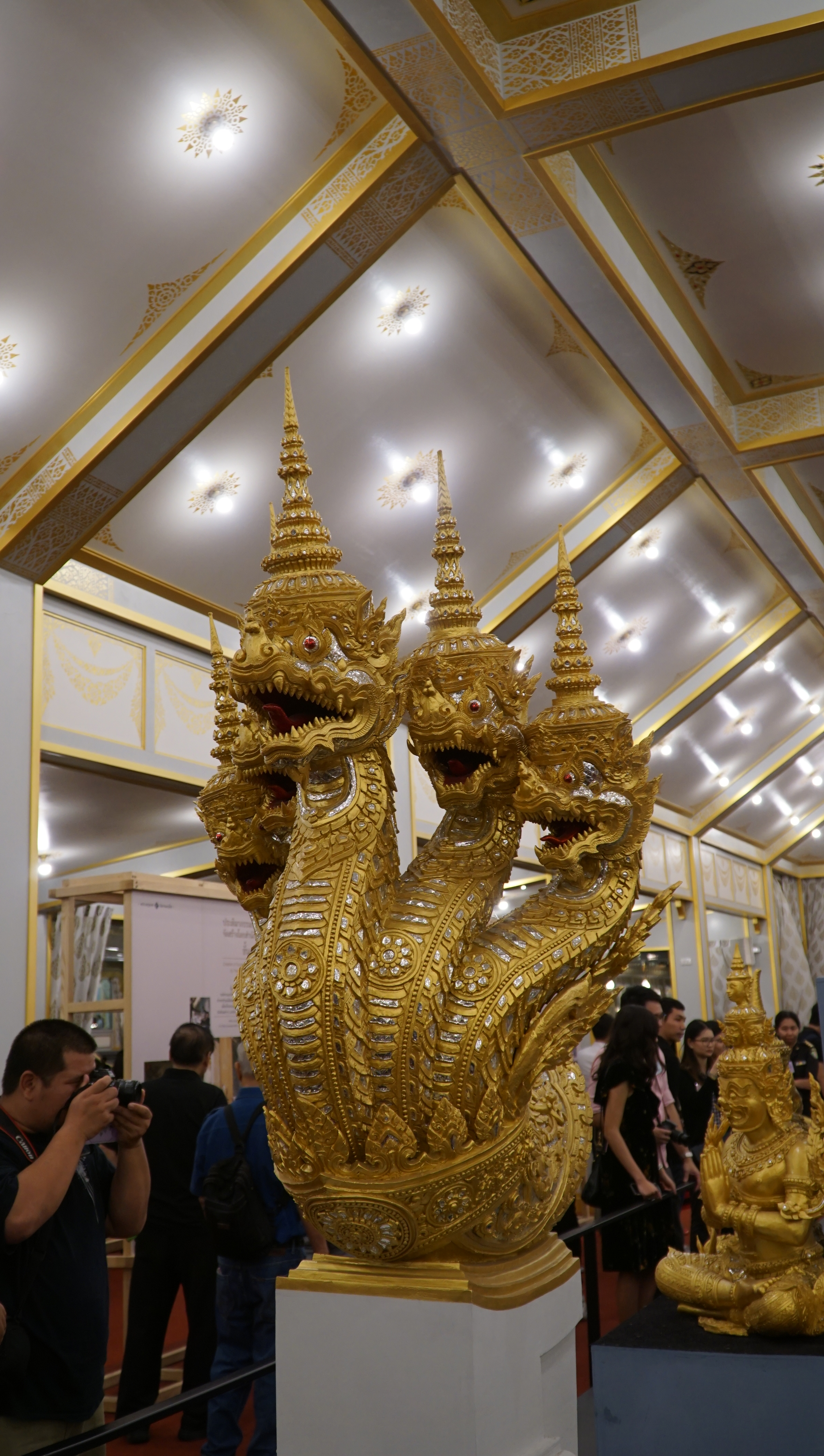
Nāga at the funeral of King Bhumibol Adulyadej of Thailand in 2017

== See also ==
- Ichchadhari naag and naagin (shape-shifting cobra)
- Lamia
- List of Nāgas
- Mahoraga
- Naga Kingdom
- Naga people (Lanka)
- Nagarjuna
- Nagvanshi
- Naga Viper pepper
- Phra Lak Phra Lam
- Rocket Festival
- Serpent (symbolism)
- Undine
- Snake worship
- Vritra

== Sources ==
- Béer, Robert (1999), The Encyclopedia of Tibetan Symbols and Motifs, Shambhala, ISBN 978-1-57062-416-2, archived from the original on 11 October 2022
- Indrapala, Karthigesu (2005). The Evolution of an Ethnic Identity - The Tamils of Sri Lanka 300 B.C.E to 1200 C.E. M.V. Publications for the South Asian Studies Centre, Sydney. ISBN 0-646-42546-3.
