= Apalala =

Nāga in Buddhist mythology

Apalāla
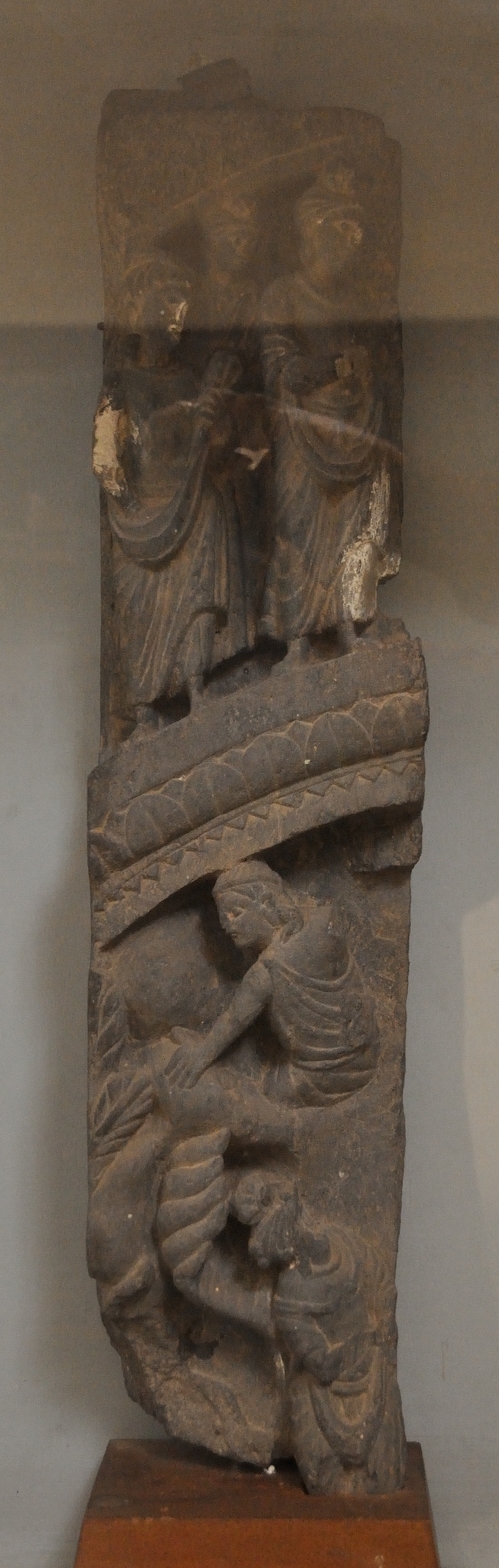
- Sanskrit: अपलाल; Apalāla
- Pāli: अपलाल; Apalāla
- Chinese: 阿波羅羅龍王 (Pinyin: Ābōluóluó Lóngwáng) 阿波羅龍王 (Pinyin: Ābōluóluó Lóngwáng)
- Japanese: 阿波羅竜王(あぱらりゅうおう) (romaji: Apara Ryū-Ō)
- Korean: 아파라라용왕 (RR: Apalala Yongwang)
- Thai: พญานาค อะปาลาละ (RTGS: Phayanak Apalala)
- Tibetan: ཀླུའི་རྒྱལ་པོ་སོག་མ་མེད་པ་ Wylie: Klu'i rgyal po sog ma med pa
- Vietnamese: Long Vương Ưu Bát La

Information
- Venerated by: Theravāda*, Mahāyāna, Vajrayāna
- Attributes: Nāgarāja

Apalāla is a water-dwelling Nāga in Buddhist mythology. It is said that Apalāla lived near the Swat River, this area is currently located in Peshawar, Khyber-Pakhtunkhwa Province, Pakistan. He is known to be a Naga King.

Apalāla was converted to Buddhism by the Buddha; this is one of the most popular legends in Buddhist lore and art. The tale is often told to children of Buddhist parents for them to learn their happiness lies in the Buddhist faith.

== In Buddhist texts ==
The story of Apalāla's conversion (Pali: Apalāladamana) does not seem to be found in the Pali Canon, although his name does appear with other beings that honor the Buddha.

The Samantapāsādikā mentions that this story was among those not included in the Three Councils. It is evidenced that it was known in Sri Lanka as it is mentioned among the scenes depicted in the relic-chamber of the Mahāthūpa. The Divyāvadāna also mentions that Apalāla's conversion took place shortly before the Buddha's death.
