= List of Sindhi Hindu festivals =

Sindhis have a rich and clearly distinct cultural heritage and are very festive. The most important festival for Hindu Sindhis is the birthday of Lord Jhoolelal and Cheti Chand.

== Sindhi Hindus festivals ==
1. Cheti Chand
Celebration of the birth of Sai Uderolal, the Avatar of Varun Devta (the God of Water) popularly known as Jhulelal. So much has been said and written about it that it would be superfluous to mention the event again. In Sindh the beginning of the New Year was considered Cheti Chand. Some businessmen open new account books on Cheti Chand; many however, do that on the eve of Diwali. On the full moon, people used to go to a river or lake and offer 'Akho' with a pinch of rice mixed with milk and flour. If there was no river or 'Darya', the ritual was performed at a well. The festival is an opportunity for people of Sindhi origin to come together and pay tribute to their cultural and spiritual heritage.

2. Sagra (Sacred thread) Sindhi Bhaibands often lived in foreign countries; therefore, their wives were always worried about the good health of their husbands. For this purpose they performed pooja and fasted on four Mondays of Sawan month, after which they perform pooja, distribute sweet rice and then had the sacred thread tied on the wrist by the priest ( Bandhan ).

3. Mahalakshmi's Sacred Thread (Mahalakshmi-a-jo-Sagro) This sacred thread has 16 strips and 17 days. On the day when the sacred thread is to be untied, it is celebrated as an important day and special savouries like satpura and pakwan of Suji & Maida are made and distributed firstly to the priests and the poor and afterwards the remaining savouries are used by family members.

4. Fasts In Sindhis, generally Mondays & Saturdays, Giyaras (Ekadashi) or Umaas (Amavasya) were observed as fasts ( Vrats ). During the fast of Satyanarayan and nine days of Ekaanaas, only one meal was generally taken.

5. Teejri
This festival takes place in the month of Sawan when married women and girls paint their hands and feet with Mehndi, go on fast for the whole day, during which time they play games, swing in Jhulas and sing love songs. Orthodox or strict Sindhi women do not even drink a sip of water until they break their fast. In the night after making an offering to the moon, they would break the fast. This is also referred to as the Sindhi version of Karwa Chauth.

6. Akhan Teej
In Sindh, Akshaya Tritiya is known as Akhandi which is celebrated in Vaisakha. On this day new earthen pots of water (matkas) are kept and everyone is offered clean and cool water. The significance of this day is to offer water to the thirsty. Hence at every nook and corner, sharbat, with pieces of apple in it, are offered to passersby along with 'prasad'. On this day, it is also customary to send new earthen pots and fruits to Priests and Mandirs.

7. AUnn-Matyo In the month of Sawan, on the Baaras (Dwadashi) of Krishna Paksha, the cereals used in food are changed, i.e. instead of wheat and rice, chapatis made of gram flour (Besan) are eaten.

8. Ban Badhri During the month of 'Bado', during the Baaras (Dwadashi) of Shukla Paksha, Varun Dev had taken an avatar. In lieu of that, small insects like ants etc. are fed Gur (jaggery) and Musti. Married daughters are invited by their parents for meals.

9. Somavati Umaas During certain months Umaas takes place on a Monday. That day is considered important for having a Snan (Ritual dip) in the waters; without talking to anyone early in the morning. It is also called 'Gungee Umaas" (Ganga Amavasya).

10. Nandhi and Vaddi Thadri Both of these take place in the month of Sawan. On the day before Thadree day, people cook lola (sweet flour cakes) and rote (fried cakes) because there has to be no lighting of fire in the house on the Thadree day. The lolas and Rotes are eaten with curd or pickle. On that day, drops of water are also sprinkled on the cooking fire to appease Sitladevi Mata.

11. Janamashtami, Ram Navmi and Shivratri Since Krishna was born after midnight, on Janamashtami, Bhajans and Kirtan are held in temples till midnight. On Ram Navmi, Lord Rama's birthday is celebrated. On Shivratri people drink 'Thaadhal' with some 'bhang' in it, after making offerings of it in the Mahadev temple. In the villages and cities, big pots of 'Taahri' (sweet rice) are prepared and distributed among all.

12. Tirmoori On this festive day parents send ladoos & chiki ( Laaee ) made of Tils to their married daughters. On the Makar Sankranti day the sun moves from south to north. It is therefore also called 'Utraan' (Uttarayan) or 'Tirmoori'. In the battle in the Mahabharata Bhishma Pitamah did not breathe his last till ‘ utraan' since on this day there happens a flash of light in Dev Lok and applying oil is prohibited in this festival.

13. Dussehra A few days before Dussehra there is a Ramlila program which is attended by throngs of people. On the Dussehra day colourful effigies of Ravana, Kumbhakarna and Meghnath are burnt.

14. Diyaaree Two days before Diwali, Sindhis start lighting Diyaas (earthen lamps) from 'Dhan Teras'. The bazaars are full with prospective consumers. Friends and relatives meet one another with affection and extend pleasantries and sweetmeats. In the night, Laxmi Poojan takes place when all the members of the family pray with reverence and respect. In the night, people take in their hands a stick to which a rag dipped in oil was tied and which is burnt. It is called 'Mollawaro'; everyone shouts 'Mollawaro ... . Mollawaro' ...

15. The Giyaras of Kati Before the independence of Pakistan in 1947, on this day people in Sindh used to be engaged in giving charity. The whole bazaar would be full with hundreds of beggars and the needy, who would spread a cloth before them, on which people, according to their might, would throw money, Bhugra, fruits etc. The jugglers used to arrange their Tamashas on the road with monkeys and bears dancing on the tunes played by the jugglers. An atmosphere of gaiety prevailed all through the day.

16. Navratra During this day, devotees of Devi eat one meal a day and do not even shave and cut hair. Ladies sing bhajans. In Nagarparkar they used to dance like Garba in Gujrat.

17. Lal Loi
In some parts of Sindh, the Sindhi community celebrates Laal Loi on 13 January every year. During Lal Loi kids bring wood sticks from their grand parents and aunties and like a fire camp burn these sticks in the night with people enjoying, dancing, and playing around the fire. Some ladies whose wishes were fulfilled offer coconuts in the fire and distribute prasad 'Sesa'; this continues till midnight.

18. Rakhri
During the Purnima of Sawan month, according to Daswani and Parchani (1978) the family priest in Sindh "traditionally tied a rakhi on the entire family while the ritual of a sister tying the Rakhi round a brother's wrist has been borrowed as a result of non-Sindhi influence in North India." In this festival, sisters tie a Rakhi to their brothers. This day is called "Rakhree Bandhan'. People in cities and places near rivers or the sea, used to offer coconuts and milk to the God of Waters 'Varun Devta so that those who were travelling in ships and boats should have a safe and sound journey.

19. Shraadh Just as in India the month of September 'Bado' is meant for Krishna Paksha as Pitar Pakhiya. For any member of the family who had died on a particular (tithi) day and date, a Shraadh was offered for the solace of the deceased's soul. The Brahmins are given food and Dakhshna. It is said that Arya Samaj carried out a strong movement against Shraadh, but the Shraadhs continued because of the faith of people since they felt that through this method the deceased members of the family are remembered and all the family members have a good gathering.

20. Nagapanchmi (Gogho/Gogro) During those days whenever the snake charmer brought snakes, they were given some Dakshina and also milk for the snakes. Nagpanchami is also called Gogho. It is a folklore from Kutch and Gujarat.

21. Holi The festival of colours in which all the young and old join together to express their joy at the change of season. Some people correlate the Holi festival with Holika, the sister of Hirnakashyap, father of Bhakt Prahlad.

=== Literary festivals ===
- Sindh Literature Festival
- Hyderabad Literary Festival
- Sindh Cultural Caravan

== Recently evolved festivals ==
- Sindhi Cultural Day, Sindhi cultural day is an annual festival celebrated in Sindh by Sindhis and across the world by the Sindhi diaspora.
