= Hyderabad Literature Festival, Pakistan =

Pakistani annual literary festival

The Hyderabad Literature Festival (HLF) is an annual literary gathering organized by the Academy for Promotion of Art, Literature and Literacy (APAL) at the Sindh Museum in Qasimabad, Hyderabad, Sindh, Pakistan.

== History ==
The Hyderabad Literature Festival was first held in April 2016 at the Hyderabad Sports Club near Niaz Stadium Hyderabad for three days, from 15 to 17 April.

The second event was held in 2017 from 6 to 8 January.

A number of prominent public figures have participated in the event, including politicians Rasool Bux Palijo, Hamida Khuhro, and Sassui Palejo, journalist Wusatullah Khan, and writer Amar Jaleel, among others.

The third HLF was organized by APAL in collaboration with the Culture, Tourism and Antiquates Department and Information and Archives Department of Sindh. It was held from 17 to 19 January 2018. 30 sessions were conducted by renowned scholars, youth activists, and prominent personalities and rising youngsters.

The event occurred from 11 to 13 January, 2019 for the fourth time. This time, talks surrounded around Shah Abdul Latif Bhittai, Manchar Lake and other issues related with tourism in Sindh. The session was concluded by the Sindh Provincial minister of education Syed Sardar Shah.

== Festival ==
The HLF takes place at the Sindh Museum in Qasimabad, Hyderabad, Sindh, Pakistan.

It compromises of a number of sessions that aim at highlighting social issue of Sindh, Sindhi Culture, issues related with Sindhi language, developments in Sindhi literature. Book stalls, film screenings, mushaira sessions and musical sessions of folk singers are also arranged during event.

== See also ==
- Sindh Literature Festival
