= Manasa =

Hindu folk goddess of snakes

- Goddess of Serpents
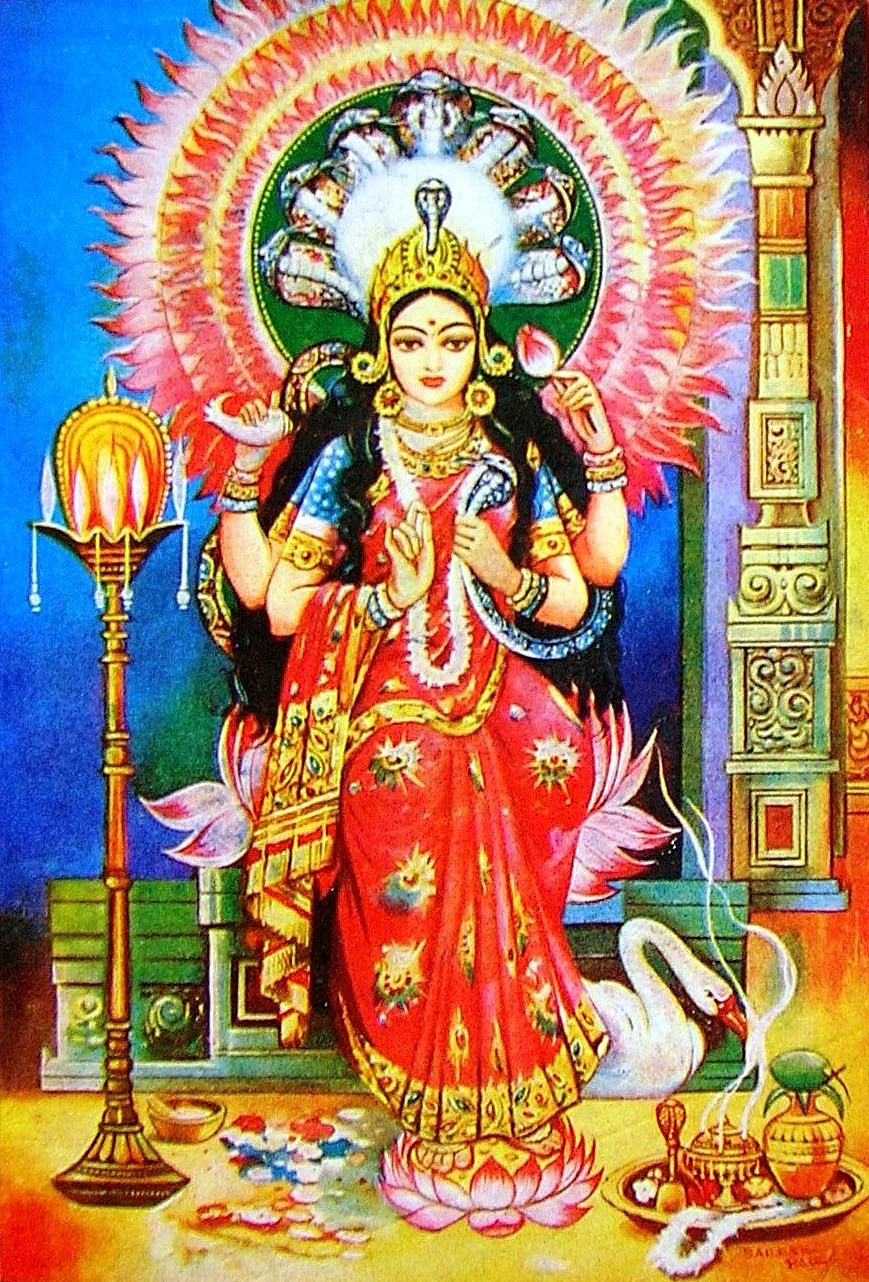
- Manasa in 20th century Bengali art
- Other names: maroi / mare / monoxa (Assamese), monośa / ceṅmuṛi kani (Bengali), mwrwi / kani deu / monosa (Hajong)
- Affiliation: Shaivism, Devi, Nāga
- Mantra: Ōṁ hrīṁ śrīṁ klīṁ aiṁ manasādēvyai svāhā
- Tree: Cactus
- Mount: Swan
- Texts: Manasamangal Kāvya
- Gender: Female
- Festivals: Naga Panchami

Genealogy
- Parents: Kashyapa and Kadru (according to scriptures); Shiva (according to Mangalakavyas)
- Siblings: Vasuki
- Spouse: Jaratkaru
- Children: Astika

Manasa (Sanskrit: मनसा, romanized: Manasā) is a Hindu goddess of snakes. She is worshipped mainly in Bihar, Odisha, Bengal, Andhra Pradesh, Chhattisgarh, Jharkhand, Uttarakhand, Uttar Pradesh, Haryana, Punjab, Rajasthan, Assam and other parts of northeastern India, chiefly for the prevention and cure of snakebite, and also for fertility and prosperity. In Hindu texts, Manasa is the daughter of Lord shiva, sister of Vasuki—king of Nāgas (serpents)—and wife of sage Jaratkaru. She is the mother of the sage Astika.

In regional tradition, her stories emphasise her bad temper and unhappiness, due to rejection by her father, Shiva, and her husband (Jaratkaru), and the hate of her stepmother Chandi (Shiva's wife, identified with Parvati in this context). Manasa is depicted as kind to her devotees, but harsh toward people who refuse to worship her. Denied full godhood due to her mixed parentage, Manasa's aim was to fully establish her authority as a goddess, and to acquire steadfast human devotees.

== Names ==
In the epic Mahabharata where Manasa is referred in passing mention, she is known as Jaratkaru. Her most popular name Manasa (lit. "mind-borne") originates from the Puranas, where she is the mind-borne daughter of the sage Kashyapa. She is also known as Padmavati in the Mangalkavyas of Bengal and Padmapurana of Assam, where the seed of Shiva from the earth reaches the subterranean land of the serpents via the stalk of a lotus (padma). Her epithets also include Vishahari (Bishohori, the destroyer of poison), Ayonisambhava (one not born of a woman) and Nityā (eternal). Manasa is known by various regional names - Nagmati (Goddess of snakes) in Bihar, Mare (the goddess of disease) and Barmati in Assam.

== Origin ==
Bhattacharya and Sen suggest that Manasa originated in South India as a non-Vedic and non-Aryan goddess and is related to the Kannada folk snake-goddess Mane-Manchamma, Nāgamma or Muddamma. Manasa was originally an Adivasi (tribal) goddess. She was accepted in the pantheon worshipped by Hindu groups. Later, Dimock suggests that although snake worship is found in the Vedas (the earliest Hindu scriptures), Manasa - a human goddess of snakes - has "little basis" in early Hinduism. Bhattacharya suggests another influence on Manasa being the poison-curing Mahayana Buddhist goddess, Janguli. Janguli shares her swan vehicle and her "poison-destroyer" epithet with Manasa. A theory suggests that Janguli may have been influenced by the Kirata-giri ("the conqueror of all poisons") of the Atharvaveda. According to McDaniel, she was included in the higher-caste Hindu pantheon, where she is now regarded as a Hindu goddess rather than a tribal one.

According to Tate, Manasa as Jaratkaru was initially recognized as a daughter of the sage Kashyapa and Kadru, the mother of all nagas in the epic Mahabharata. According to Bhattacharya, the Jaratkaru of the Mahabharata is not the Manasa popular in Bengal.

By the 14th century, Manasa was identified as the goddess of fertility and marriage rites and was assimilated into the Shaiva pantheon, related to the god Shiva. Myths glorified her by describing that she saved Shiva after he drank the poison, and venerated her as the "remover of poison". Her popularity grew and spread to southern India, and the cult of her followers began to rival the earliest Shaivism (the cult of Shiva). As a consequence, stories attributing Manasa's birth to Shiva emerged and ultimately Shaivism adopted this indigenous goddess into the Brahmanical tradition of mainstream Hinduism. Alternatively, Vasudev suggests that the Bengali tale of Manasa reflects rivalry between Shaivism and the goddess-centric Shaktism.

== Iconography ==
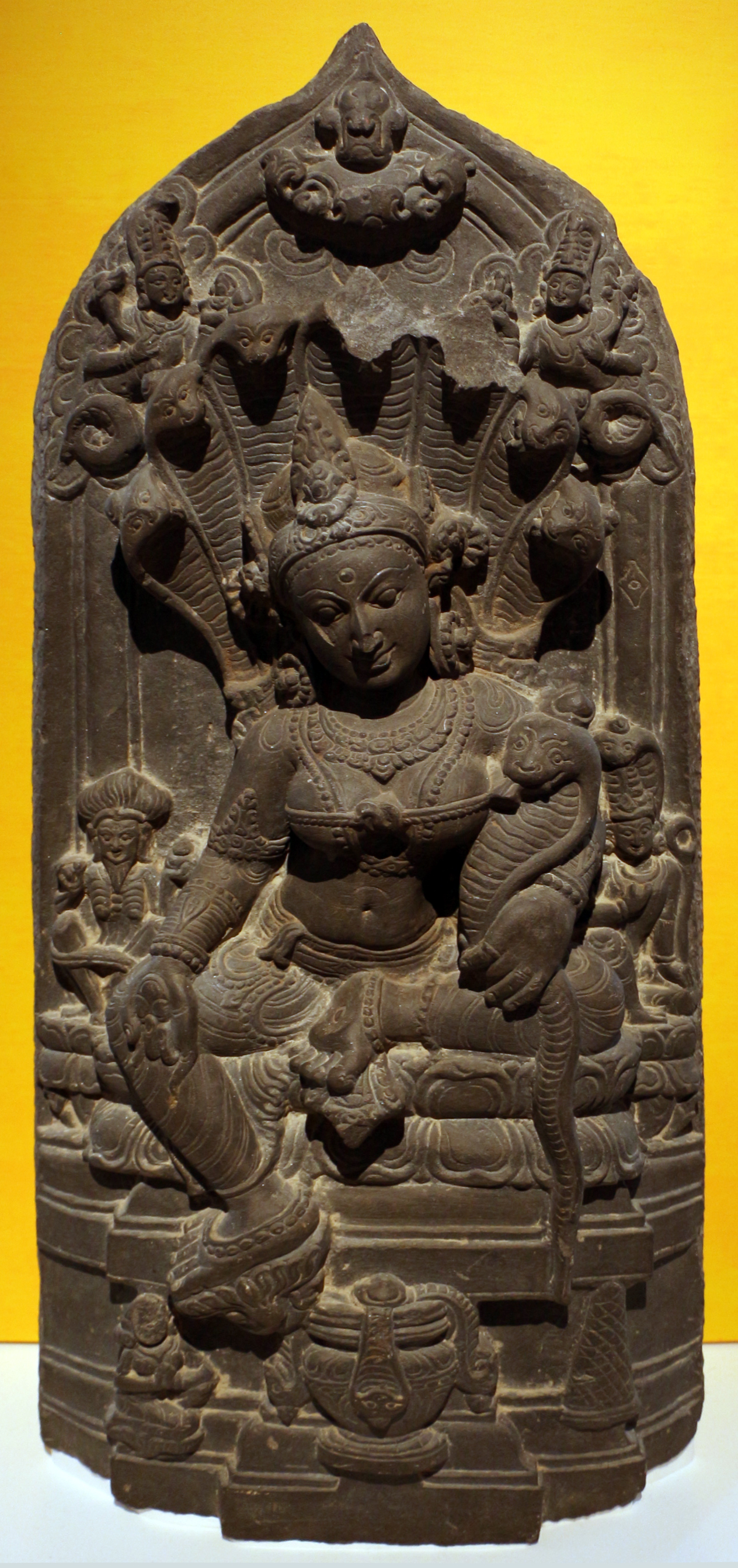
Manasa with her husband Jaratkaru and son Astika flanked by Nagas, 11th century Pala period statue from Bengal

Female serpent deities are depicted from traditional Indian scriptures such as Mayasamgraha and ancient art handbooks such as Shilparatna. These ancient scriptures normally depict them in one of two ways, either in a human like form beneath a canopy of snake hoods (can be one or many) or as half human and half serpent. Manasa is depicted as a beautiful woman with a golden complexion (hence the nickname Gauri, Golden) and smiling face with four arms - right hands holding a shankh (conch) and displaying Abhayamudra and her left hands holding a lotus and a snake. She is covered with snakes and sitting on a lotus platform (thus known by her epithet Padmalaya). Sometimes, she is depicted with a child (assumed to be her son, Astika) on her lap. Her vahana (mount) is a swan. She is also accompanied by Neta (Neto), her female companion.

== Scriptural References ==
=== Mahabharata ===
The Mahabharata mentions Manasa (known here as Jaratkaru) in passing reference in the tale of Jaratkaru and Astika. Sage Jaratkaru practised severe austerities and had decided to abstain from marriage. Once, he came across a group of men hanging from a tree upside down. These men were his ancestors, who were doomed to misery as their children had not performed their last rites. So, they advised Jaratkaru to marry and have a son who could free them of those miseries by performing the ceremonies. Vasuki offered his sister Manasa's hand to Jaratkaru. Manasa gave birth to a son, Astika, who freed his ancestors. Astika also helped in saving the naga race from destruction when King Janamejaya decided to exterminate them by sacrificing them in his yajna, called the sarpa satra.

=== Puranas ===
Kalighat painting of goddess Manasā standing on a snake with a few wrapped in her hand, Cleveland Museum of Art

The Puranas are the first scriptures to speak about her birth. They declare that sage Kashyapa is her father, not Shiva as described in the later Mangalkavyas. Once, when serpents and reptiles had created chaos on the Earth, Kashyapa created the goddess Manasa from his mind (mana). The creator god Brahma made her the presiding deity of snakes and reptiles. Manasa gained control over the earth, by the power of mantras she chanted. Manasa then propitiated the god Shiva, who told her to please the god Krishna. Upon being pleased, Krishna granted her divine Siddhi powers and ritually worshipped her, making her an established goddess.

Kashyapa married Manasa to sage Jaratkaru, who agreed to marry her on the condition that he would leave her if she disobeyed him. Once, when Jaratkaru was awakened by Manasa, he became upset with her because she awakened him too late for worship, and so he left her temporarily.

== Manasamangal Kavya ==
The Manasamangal Kāvya is the primary text for the followers of Goddess Manasa. It is a sub-genre of the Mangalkavyas which are devotional paeans to local deities such as Manasa, composed in Bengal between the 13th and the 18th centuries. The Manasa Mangalkavya by Vijay Gupta (Bijoy Gupta, late 15th century) and Manasa Vijaya (1495) by Bipradas Pipilai trace the origin and myths of the goddess however these stray from Puranaic references probably due to creative licenses exercised. At least fifteen Mangalkavyas dedicated to Manasa are known. Scholar D. C. Sen traced fifty-one versions of her tale. The Padmapurana by Sukavi Narayandev (17th century) is well-known in Assam, especially performed in Ojapali dance.

=== Birth and Early Life ===
According to Manasa Vijaya, Manasa was born when Shiva's seed touched a statue of a girl sculpted by Vasuki’s mother. Vasuki accepted Manasa as his sister, and granted her the charge of poison that was produced when King Prithu milked the Earth as a cow. When Shiva saw Manasa, he was attracted to her, but she proved to him that he was her father. Shiva took Manasa to his home where his wife, Chandi, suspected Manasa of being Shiva's concubine or co-wife, and insulted Manasa and burnt her left eye, leaving Manasa half-blind. Later, when Shiva was dying of poison, Manasa cured him. On one occasion, when Chandi kicked her, Manasa rendered her senseless with a glance of her poison eye. Finally, tired of quarrels between Manasa and Chandi, Shiva deserted Manasa under a tree, but created a companion for her from his tears of remorse, called Neto or Netā.

Later, the sage Jaratkaru married Manasa, but Chandi ruined Manasa's wedding night. Chandi advised Manasa to wear snake ornaments and then threw a frog in the bridal chamber which caused the snakes to run around the chamber. As a consequence, the terrified Jaratkaru ran away from the house. After few days, he returned and Astika, their son, was born.

=== Legend of Behula - Lakhinder ===
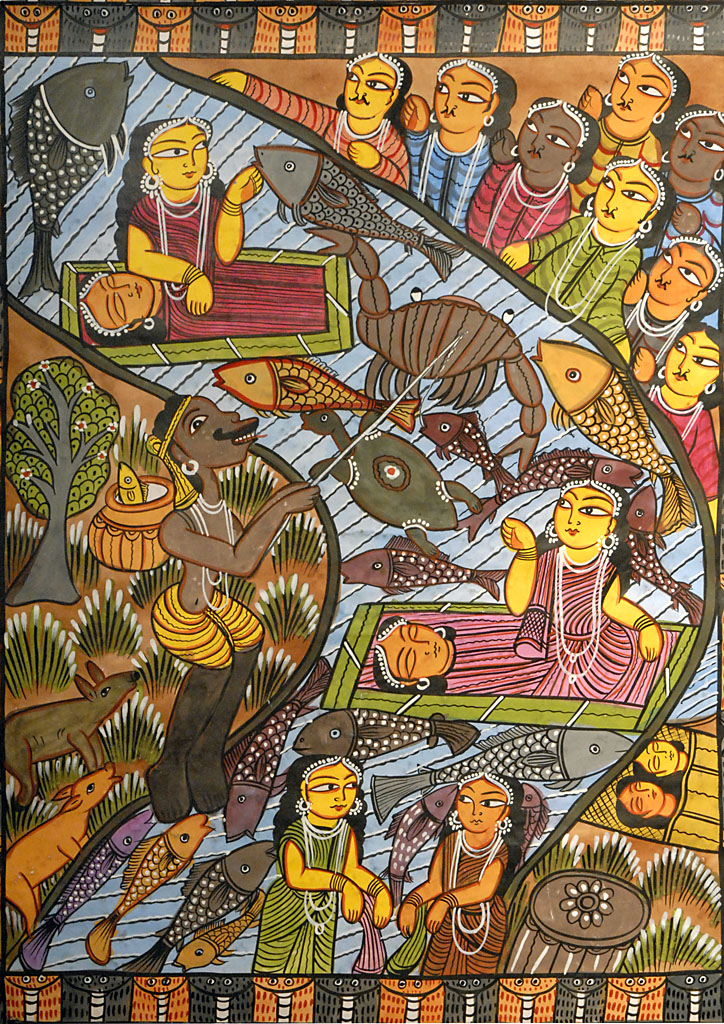
A scene from Manasa Mangal.

Accompanied by her adviser, Neto, Manasa descended to earth to see human devotees. She was initially mocked by the people but then Manasa forced them to worship her by raining calamity on those who denied her power. She managed to convert people from different walks of life, including the Muslim ruler Hasan, but failed to convert Chand Sadagar. Manasa wanted to become a mainstream goddess like Lakshmi or Saraswati. To get there, she had to achieve the worship of Chand Sadagar who was extremely adamant and took oath not to worship Manasa. Thus to gain his fear and insecurity, she killed his six sons. At last Manasa conspired against two dancers of Indras Court who loved each other, Anirudha and Usha. Anirudh had to take birth as Lakhinder, Chand and Sanaka's seventh son. Usha took birth as Behula and married him. Manasa killed him but Behula floated on water for nine months with the dead body of her husband and finally brought back the lives of the seven sons and the lost prosperity of Chand. At last, he yielded by offering a flower to the goddess with his left hand without even looking at her. This gesture made Manasa so happy that she resurrected all of Chand's sons and restored his fame and fortunes. The Mangal kavyas say that after this, the worship of Manasa was popular forever.

The Manasa Mangalkavya attributes Manasa's difficulty in attracting devotees to an unjust curse she gave to Chand in his previous life. Chand then retaliated with a counter-curse that worshipping her would not be popular on earth unless he worshipped her also.

=== Historical and Social analysis ===
Ananda K. Coomaraswamy and Sister Nivedita say, "[The] legend of [Chand Sadagar and] Manasā Devī, [...] who must be as old as the Mykenean stratum in Asiatic society, reflects the conflict between the religion of Shiva and that of female local deities in Bengal. Afterwards Manasā or Padmā was recognized as a form of Shakti, [...] and her worship accepted by Shaivas. She is a phase of the mother-divinity who for so many worshippers is nearer and dearer than the far-off and impersonal Shiva...".

David Curley talks about how, in pre colonial Bengal, Manasamangal Kāvya was not only a historical archive but a mode of self reflection through which pre modern Bengali society processed change in their culture, economy and even politics. For example, Merchants and traders were seen as either predators or easy targets in a risky economy. This was because of the uncertainty created by the different views that the local population had on long-distance trades. During these times, there are stories in the Kavyas of merchants like Chand Sadagar and Dhanapati, who performed business deals and religious worship by exchanging tributes and goods whilst honouring a higher power, to preserve honour and defuse possible economic or physical danger.

Historian Curley also talks about how these texts reflect upon how local rulers, also referred to as “Little Kings”, redefined political authority. Instead of relying solely on military strength and violence, they started to employ more peaceful methods of unity as well as funding the local deity to earn the faith of the local population.

== Regional Variations of Worship ==
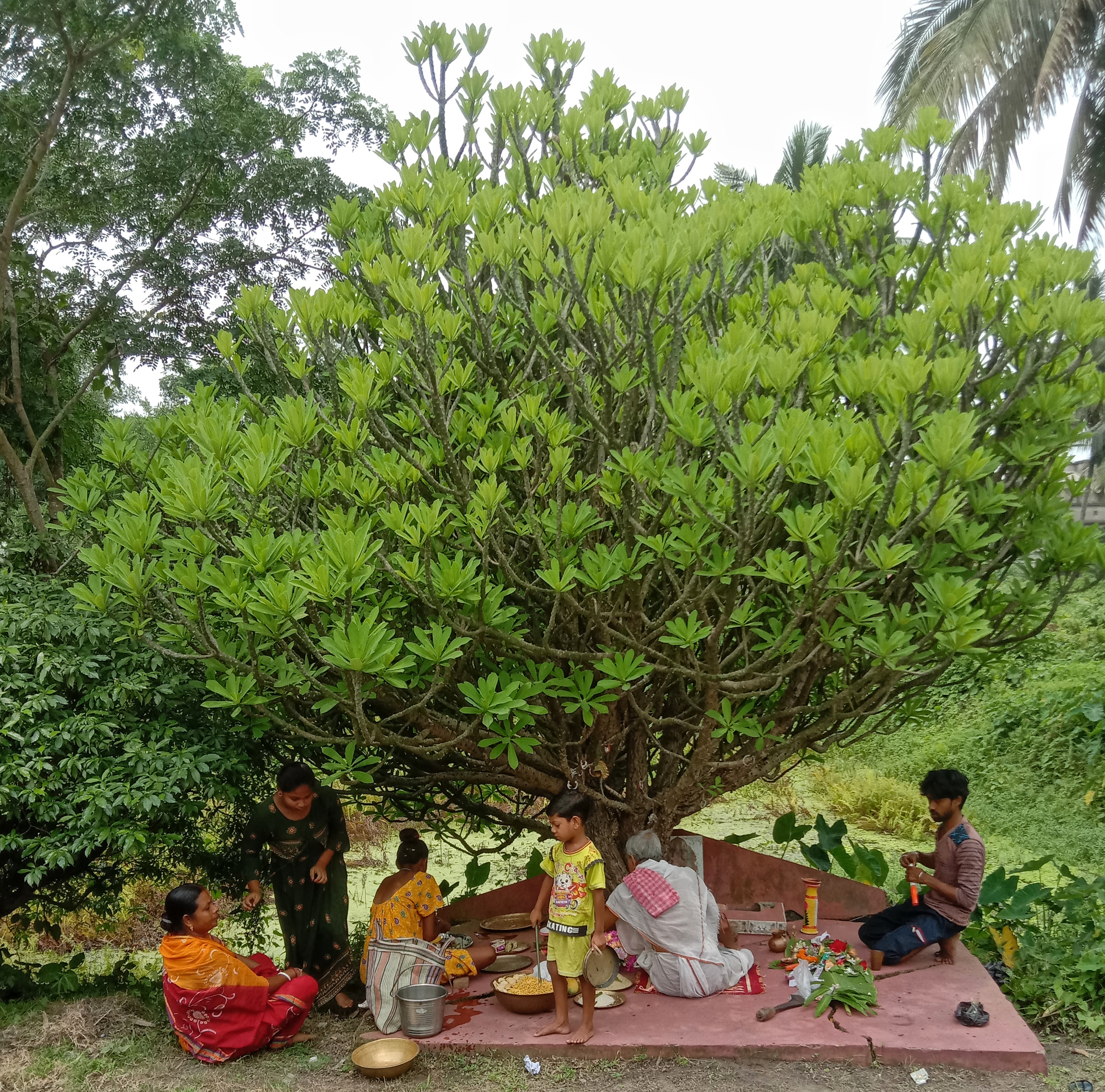
Manasa puja on the day of Dashahara at a bedi of Euphorbia neriifolia, in West Bengal.

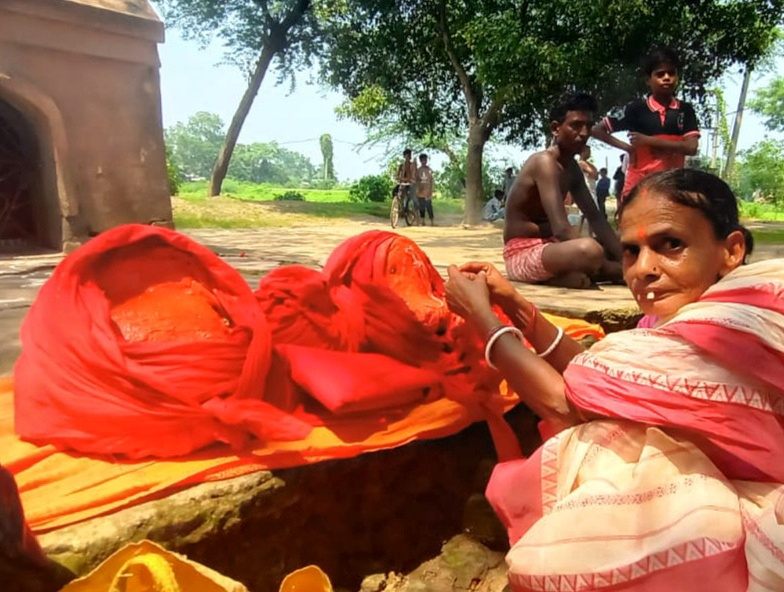
Women with the Manasa Sila (murti) during puja at Birbhum in 2021

Generally, Manasa is worshipped without an image. A branch of a cactus tree, an earthen pot or an earthen snake image is worshipped as the goddess, though images of Manasa are worshipped too. She is worshipped for protection from and cure of snake bites.

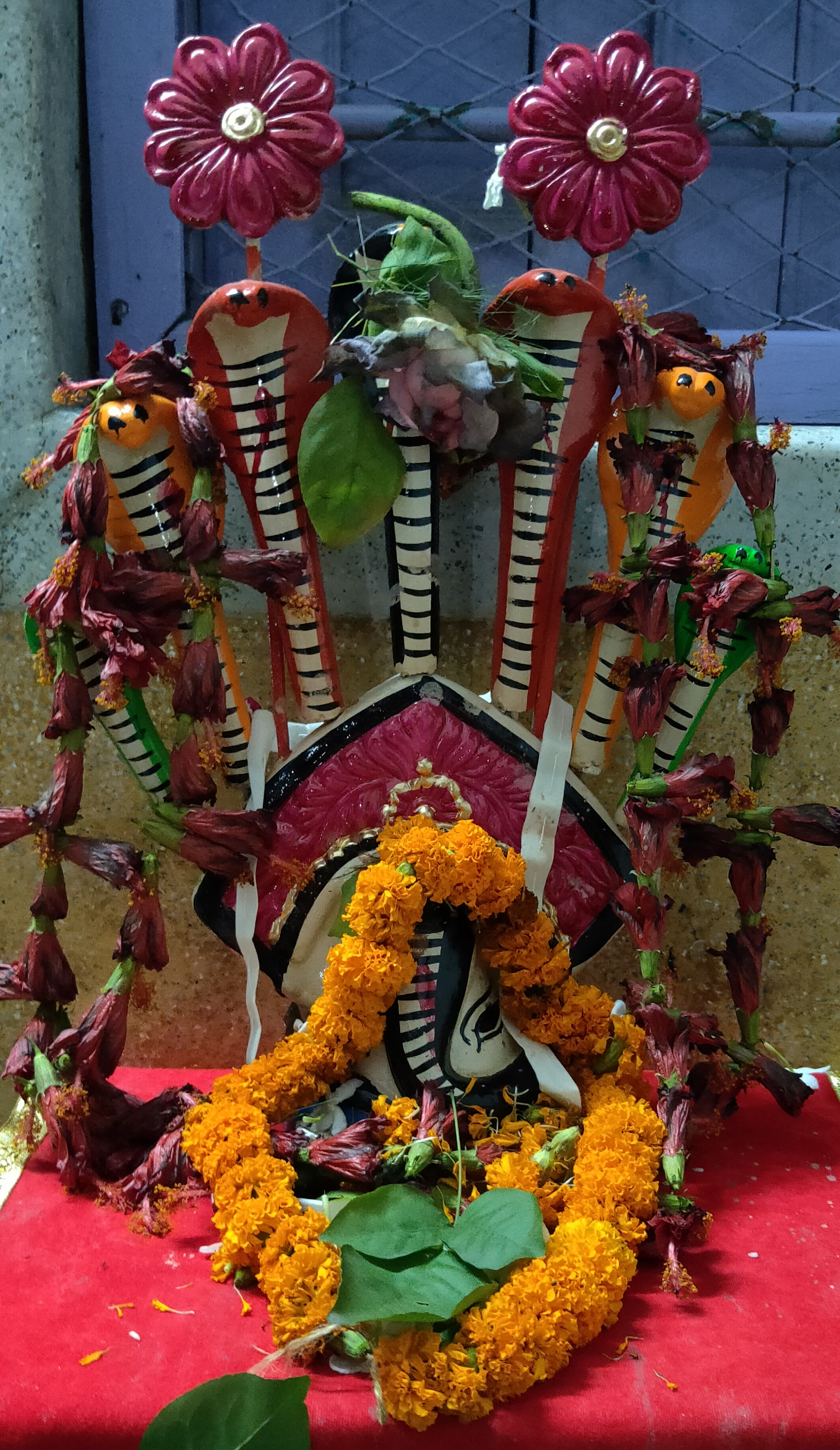
Snake Idol of Goddess Manasa

In South Bengal, she is ritually worshipped in the local temples as well as in the houses. Almost every Hindu household has a dedicated shrine for goddess Manasa along with Lord Vishnu (Hari), the duo represented by the branch of cactus tree and tulsi tree respectively.

The goddess is widely worshipped in the rainy season (especially months of Shravan and Bhadra), when the snakes are most active. Manasa is also a very important fertility deity, and her blessings are invoked for child bearing. She is commonly worshipped alongside her female companion Neta, who is considered a manifestation of her destructive power. Described as a vindicative goddess in Bengal's Mangalkavyas, Manasa is required to be pleased to avoid her wrath, manifested as snake bite, disease, childlessness or starvation.

In North Bengal, among the Rajbanshis, Manasa (called Bishohora, Bishohori or Padmavati) is one of the most important goddesses, and her thaan (shrine) may be found in the courtyard of almost every agrarian household. Among the lower-caste Hindus of East Bengal (present-day Bangladesh) too, she is worshipped with great pomp.

Manasa is an especially important deity in Bengal for the mercantile castes. This is because Chando of the Manasamangal was the first to initiate her worship, and Behula, the heroine of the Manasamangal was a daughter of the Saha clan (a powerful trading community).

Manasa is the prime deity of Anga Region, specially in Anga's capital, Champa (now Bhagalpur). It is believed that the story of Chand Saudagar and Behula started from this very place. In the old quarters of Champanagar in the city, stands an enormous temple of Manasa. Several artefacts and sculptures found in and around the place made locals believed that it was where Chand Saudagar had his Rajbari. A recent excavation has also found "Loha- Bashor ghor" or "Bashor ghor", the building made specifically for the wedding night of Lakhendar and Behula. The Angika lokgatha, "Behula Bishari Lokgatha" and the regional art, Manjusha Chitrakatha is full flegedly based on the chronicles of Manasa and the hardships of Behula. Every year, from 16 to 19 August, Bhagalpur springs up like a scented flower to worship the local guardian Manasa and commemorate the wedding of Behula

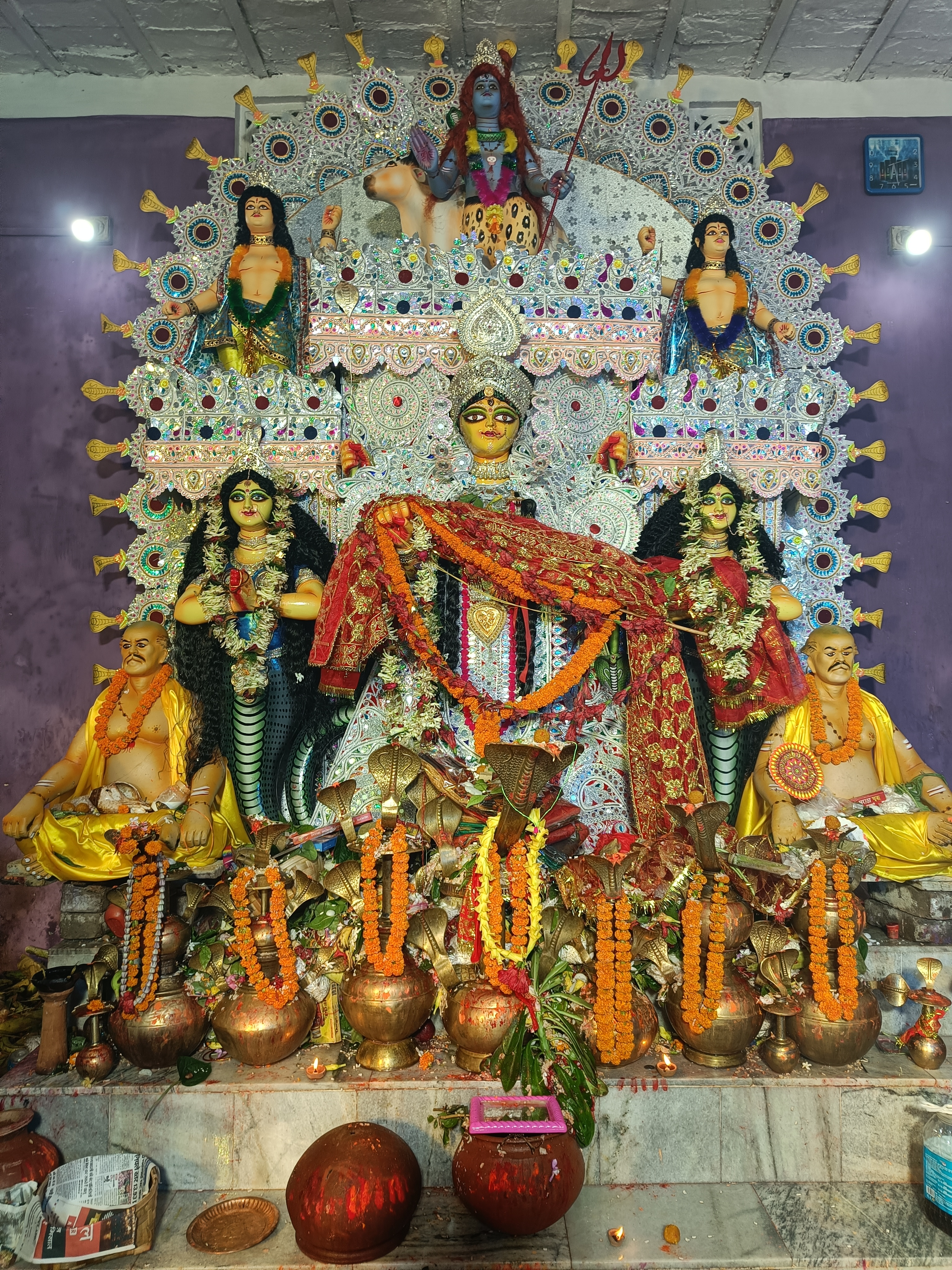
Mansa Puja at Deepnagar chowk in Bhagalpur

Manasa is also worshipped extensively in Assam, and a form of Oja-Pali (musical folk theatre) is dedicated entirely to her myth.

Manasa is ceremonially worshipped on Nag Panchami - a festival of snake worship in the Hindu month of Shravan (July–August). Hindu women observe a fast (vrata) on this day and offer milk at snake holes. Manasa devi is worshipped between November and February each year since 120 years at the Manasa Devi mandir at Lala bagan, Kolkata.

== Notable temples ==
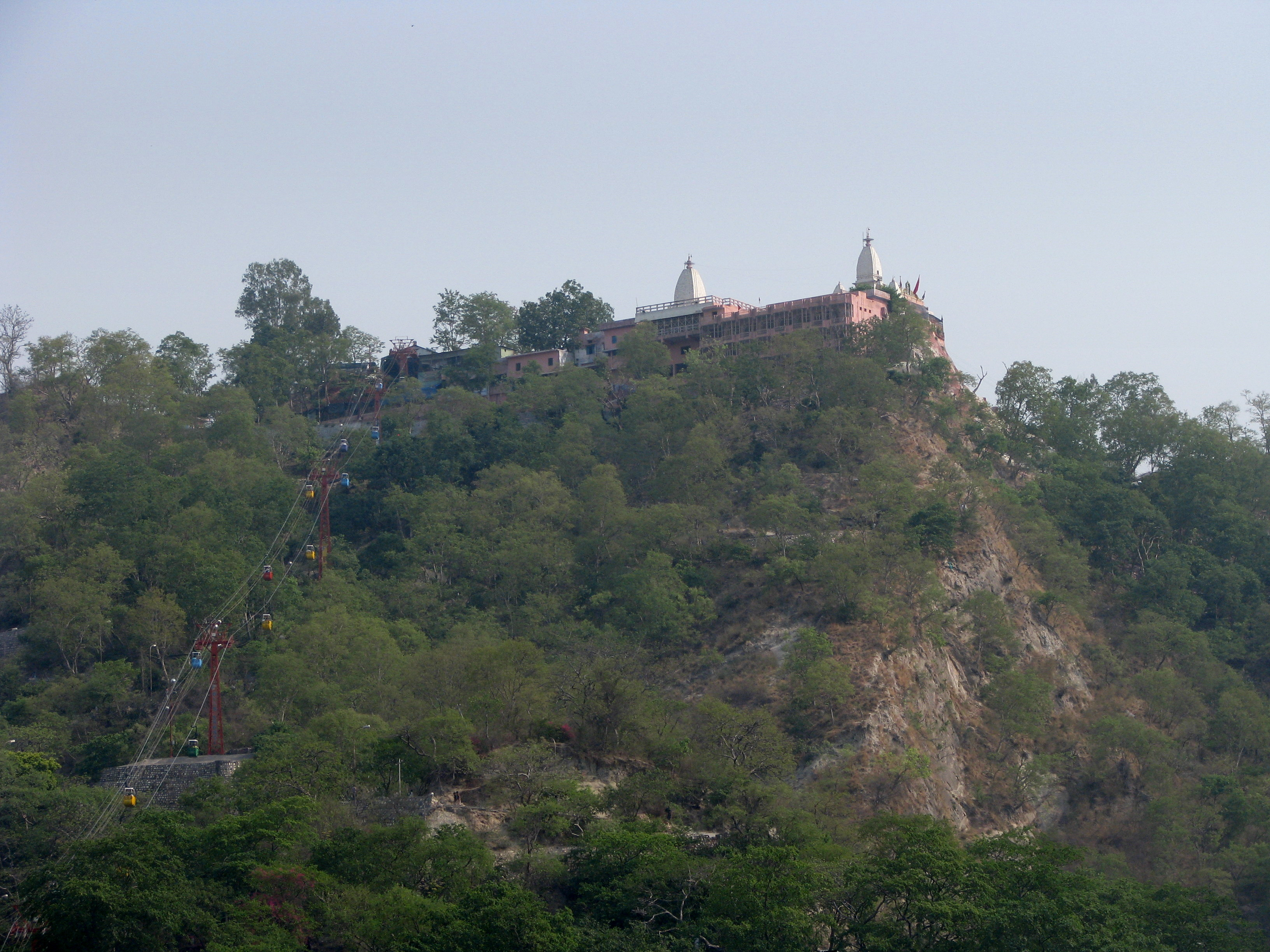
Mansa Devi Temple, Haridwar

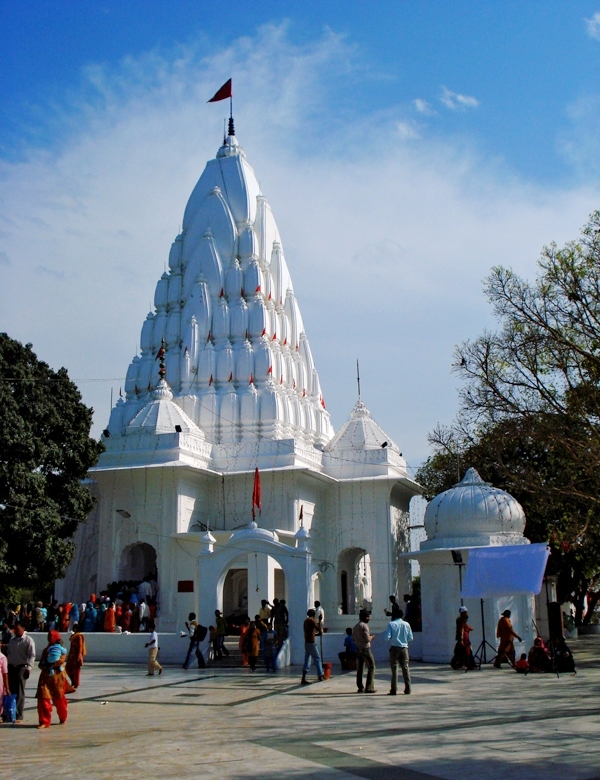
Mata Mansa Devi Mandir, Panchkula, near Chandigarh.

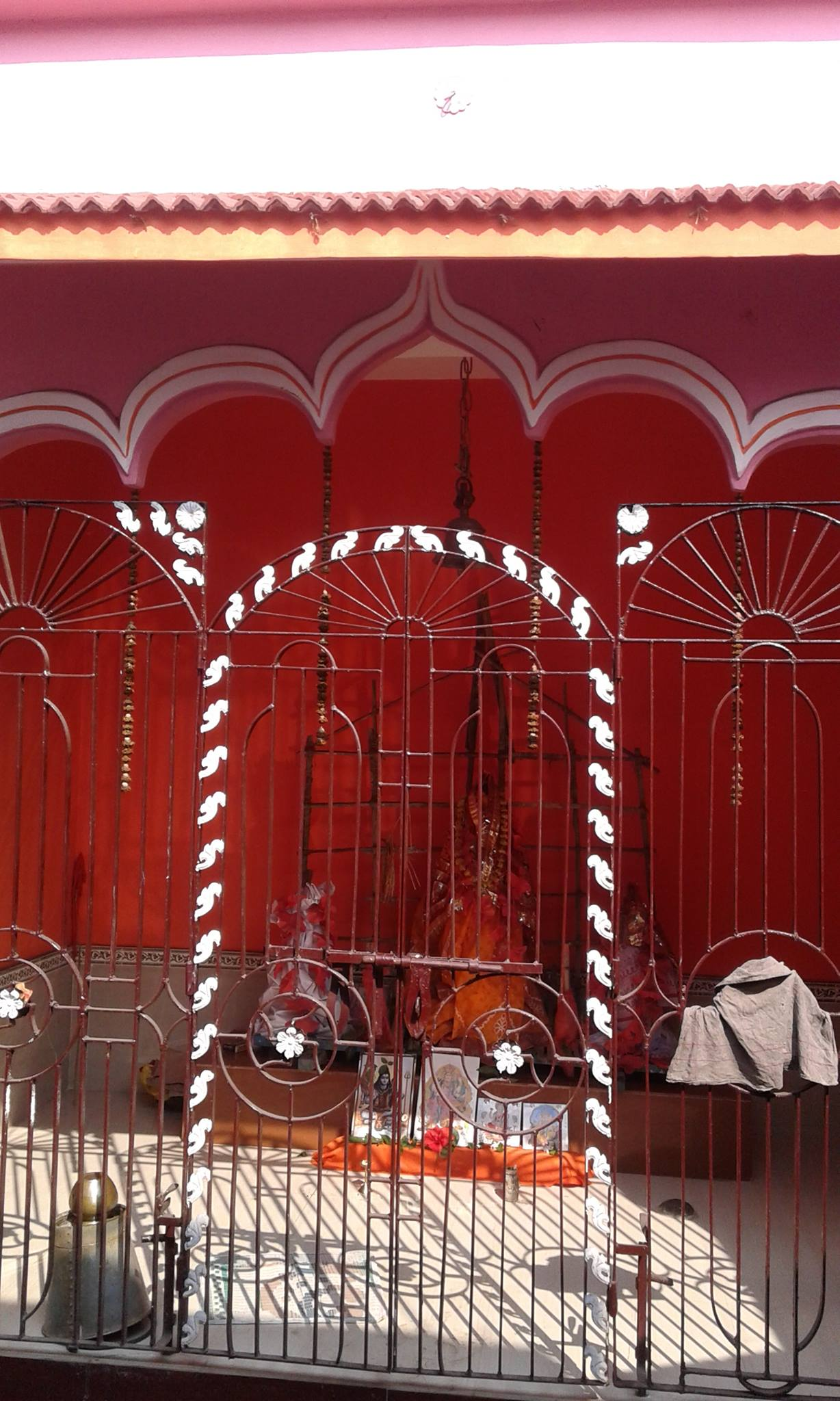
Mansa Devi Temple, Kandra, Jharkhand

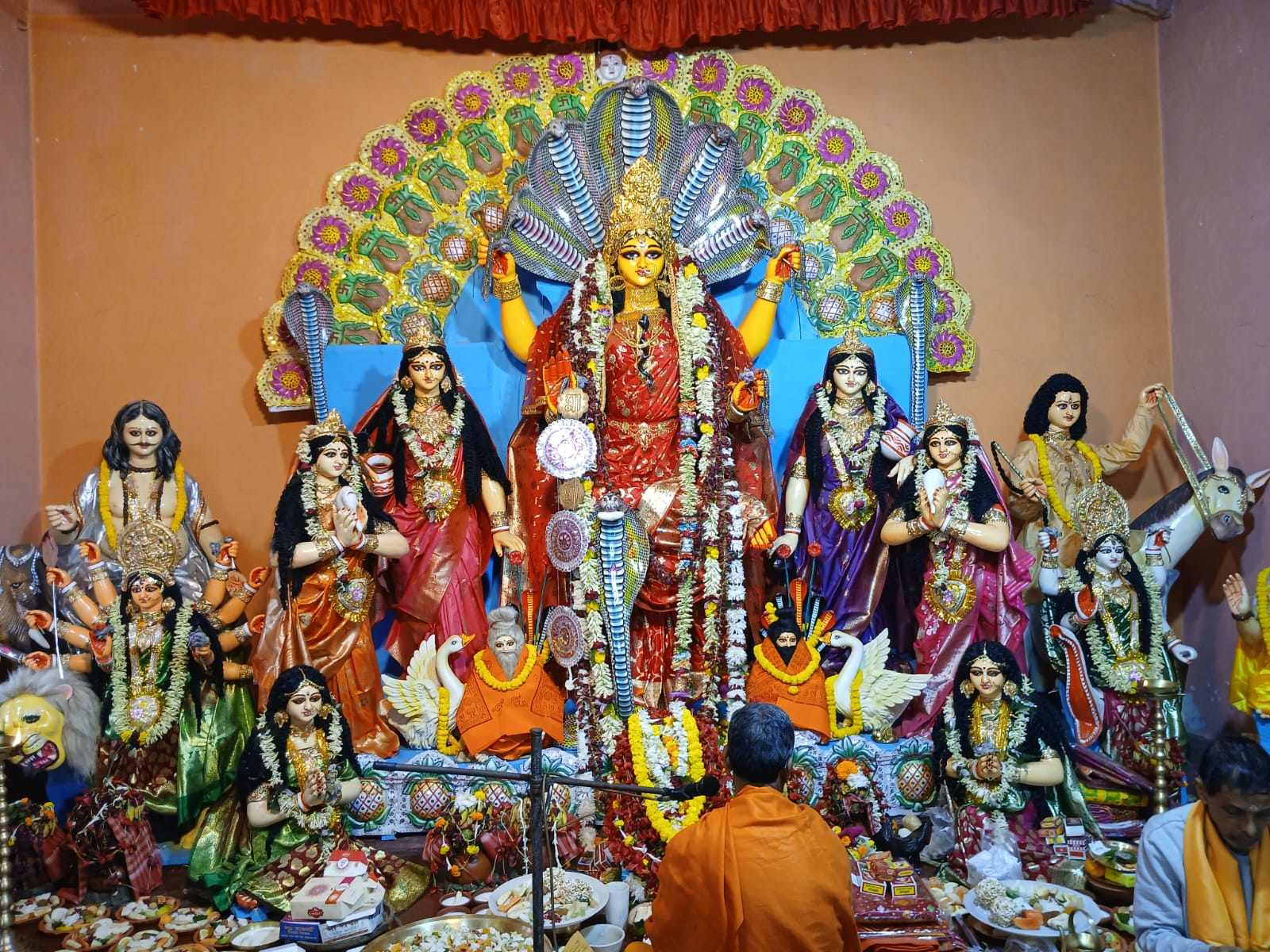
Manasha Puja at Lala Bagan, Simla Street, Kolkata.
- Shri Manasa Devi Temple (Swayambu), Kasimpet(Manasavaram), Karimnagar, Telangana
- Ma Manasha Mandir, Fulidanga, Tarapith - West Bengal
- Mansa Bishari Temple, Bhagalpur, Bihar
- Manasa Debi Temple, Varanasi
- Mansa Devi Temple, Mukkamala, West Godavari, Andhra Pradesh
- Mansa Devi Temple, Naidupeta, Nellore, Andhra Pradesh
- Mansa Devi Temple, Tilaru, Srikakulam, Andhra Pradesh
- Mansa Devi Temple, Dornipadu, Kurnool, Andhra Pradesh
- Mansa Devi Temple, Kanumalapalle, Kadapa, Andhra Pradesh
- Mansa Devi Temple, Chinadugam, Srikakulam, Andhra Pradesh
- Mansa Devi Temple, Kurnool, Andhra Pradesh
- Mansa Devi Temple, Nellore, Andhra Pradesh
- Mansa Devi Temple, Thurpu Rompidodla, Nellore, Andhra Pradesh
- Mansa Devi Temple, Vadluru, West Godavari, Andhra Pradesh
- Ma Manasha Mandir, Lake Town, Kolkata, West Bengal
- Ma Manasha Mandir, Halshi Bagan, (Lala Bagan) Simla Street, Kolkata, West Bengal
- Ma Manasa Mandir, Gopinagar, Khamarchandi, Haripal, Hooghly, West Bengal
- Ma Manasa Mandir, Jakpur, Paschim Medinipur, West Bengal

== See also ==
- Shesha
- Vasuki
- Kadru
- Takshaka
- Karkotaka

== Notes ==
=== Bibliography ===
- McDaniel, June (2004). Offering Flowers, Feeding Skulls: Popular Goddess Worship in West Benegal. Oxford University Press, US. p. 368. ISBN 0-19-516790-2.
- Wilkins, W. J. (2004). Hindu Mythology, Vedic and Puranic (First published: 1882 ed.). Kessinger Publishing. p. 428. ISBN 0-7661-8881-7.
- McDaniel, June (2002). Making Virtuous Daughters and Wives: An Introduction to Women's Brata Rituals in Bengali Folk Religion. SUNY Press. p. 144. ISBN 0-7914-5565-3.
- Dimock, Edward C. (1962). "The Goddess of Snakes in Medieval Bengali Literature". History of Religions. 1 (2): 307–321. doi:10.1086/462451. JSTOR 1062059. S2CID 162313578.
- Dowson, John (2003). Classical Dictionary of Hindu Mythology and Religion, Geography, History. Kessinger Publishing. ISBN 0-7661-7589-8.
- Chakravarty, Saumitra (2022). The Goddess Re-discovered: Gender and Sexuality in Religious Texts of Medieval Bengal. Taylor & Francis. ISBN 978-1-000-63287-3.
