= Naga Panchami =

Hindu festival honouring serpents

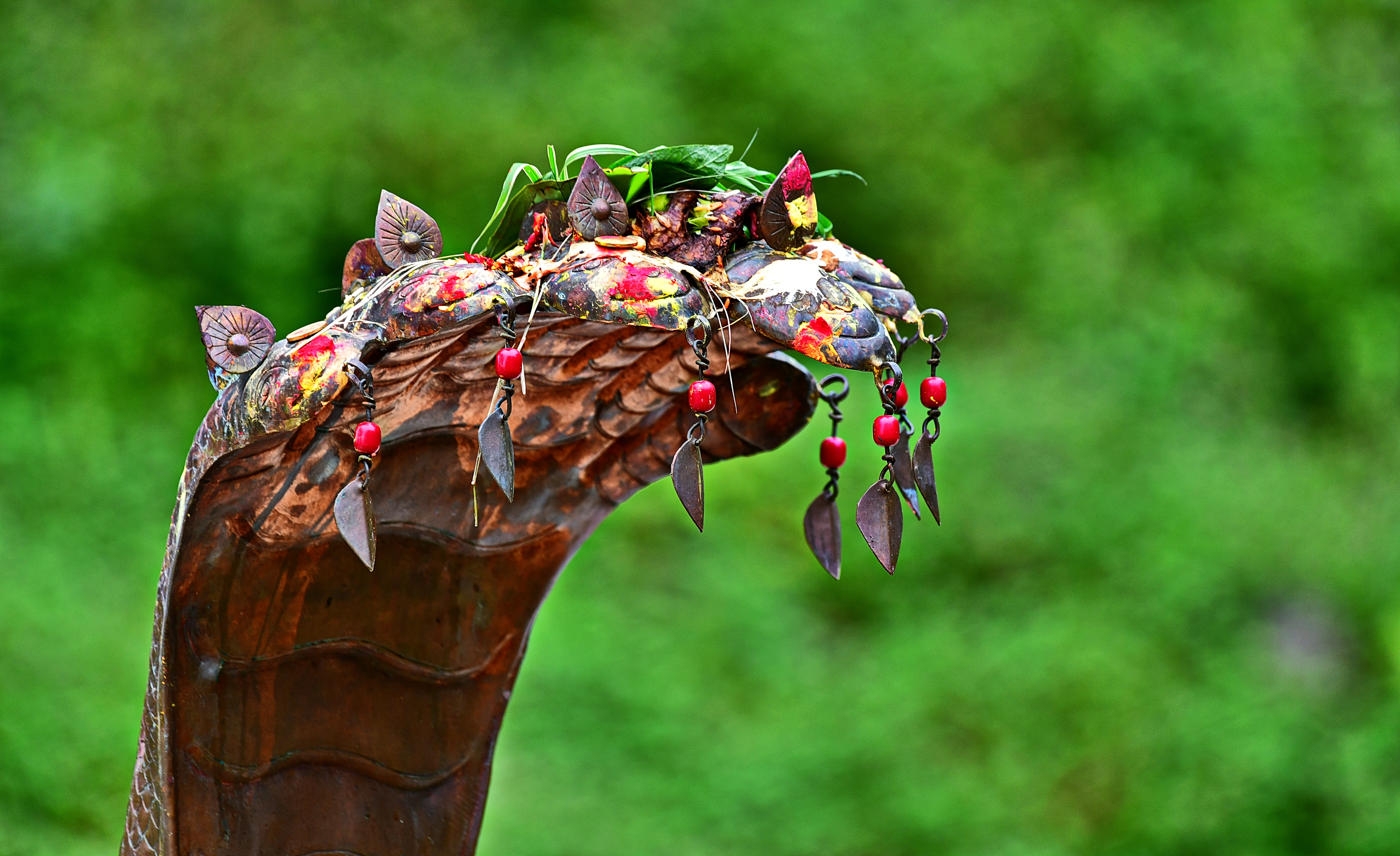
- Naga worshipped at Nagasthan, a Naga temple at Chandragiri, Kathmandu during Naga Panchami
- Also called: Naga Puja
- Observed by: Hindus, Jains, and Buddhists
- Type: Religious, India and Nepal
- Significance: Honors the divine serpent deities (Nagas), symbolizing protection, strength, and the balance of nature.
- Observances: Veneration of cobras or their images
- Date: Shraavana Shukla Panchami
- 2026 date: 17 August, Tuesday

Explanatory note on Hindu festival dates
- The Hindu calendar is lunisolar but most festival dates are specified using the lunar portion of the calendar. A lunar day is uniquely identified by three calendar elements: māsa (lunar month), pakṣa (lunar fortnight) and tithi (lunar day). Furthermore, when specifying the masa, one of two traditions are applicable, viz. amānta / pūrṇimānta. If a festival falls in the waning phase of the moon, these two traditions identify the same lunar day as falling in two different (but successive) masa. A lunar year is shorter than a solar year by about eleven days. As a result, most Hindu festivals occur on different days in successive years on the Gregorian calendar.

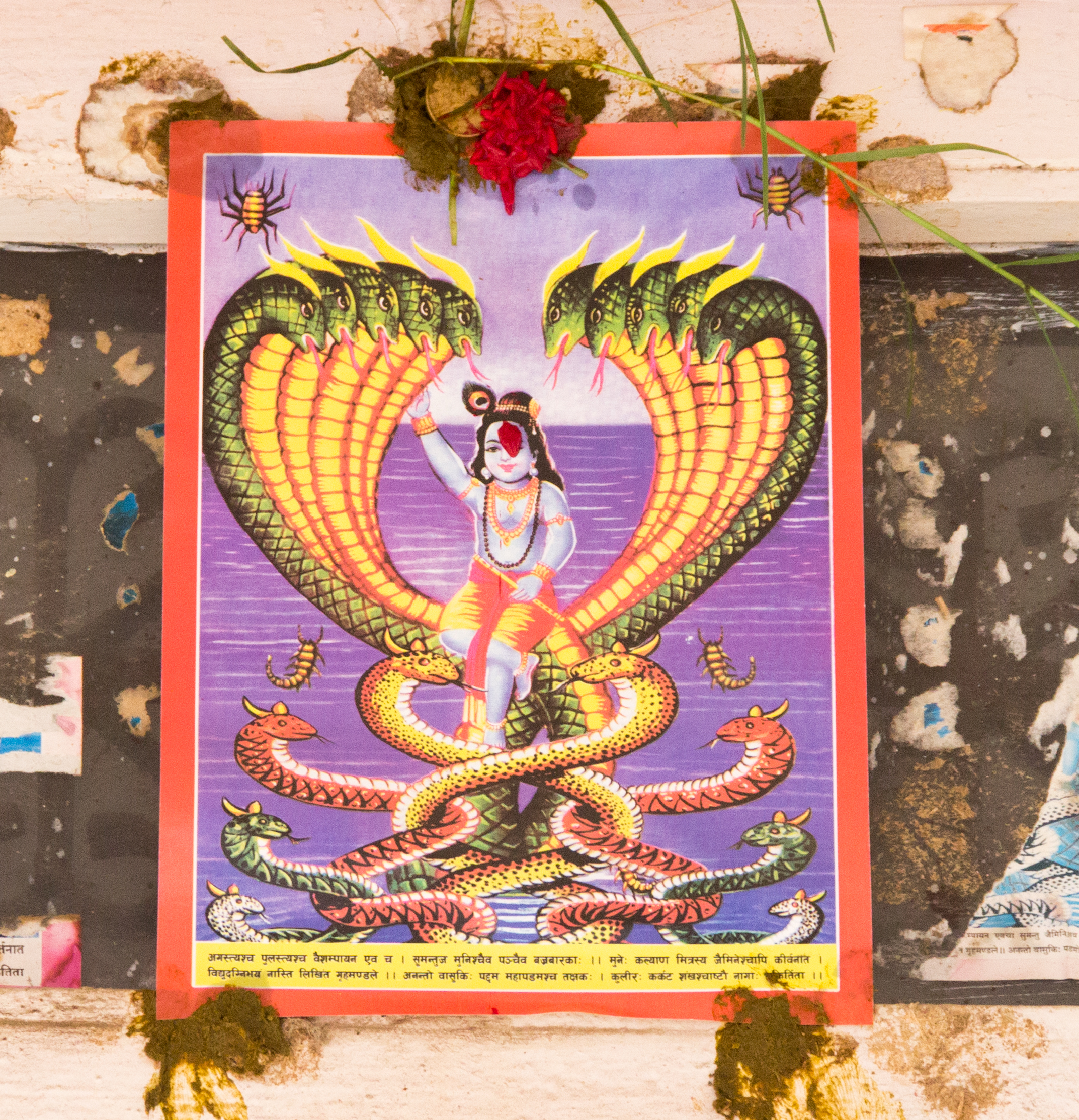
Naga Panchami poster - an image depicting Lord Krishna dancing on Nagas is pasted on the main doors of Nepalese households.

Naga Panchami (Sanskrit: नागपञ्चमी, IAST: Nāgapañcamī; lit. 'Fifth Day of the Serpents') is a day of traditional worship of nagas (or najas or nags) or snakes (which are associated with the mythical Nāga beings) observed by Hindus, Jains, and Buddhists throughout Nepal and some parts of India, and other countries where Hindu, Jain, and Buddhist adherents live. The worship is offered on the fifth day of bright half of lunar month of Shravana (July/August), according to the Hindu calendar. Some Indian states, such as Rajasthan, Bihar and Gujarat, celebrate Naga Panchami on the dark half (Krishna Paksha) of the same month. As part of the festivities, a Naga or serpent deity made of silver, stone, wood, or a painting is given a reverential bath with milk and their blessings are sought for the welfare of the family. Live snakes, especially cobras, are also worshipped on this day, especially with offerings of milk and generally with the assistance of a snake charmer.

In the Mahabharata epic, the sage Astika stops King Janamejaya from sacrificing and eventually decimating the serpent race (Sarpa Satra). This sacrifice was performed by Janamejaya to avenge the death of his father Parikshita, who was killed by Takshaka, the king of the snakes. The day that the sacrifice was stopped was on the Shukla Paksha Panchami day in the month of Shravana. During this sacrifice, the Mahabharata as a whole was first narrated by the sage, Vaisampayana. That day has since been observed as Naga Panchami.

== Etymology ==
Panchami is the fifth day among the fifteen days of the moon's waxing and/or waning. This special day of the serpent worship always falls on the fifth day of the moon's waning in the Lunar Hindu month of Shrāvana July/August. Hence this is called Naga Panchami (Naga: cobra; or simply, serpent).

== Legends ==
There are many legends in Hinduism and folklore narrated to the importance of worship of snakes. According to Hindu Puranas and the Mahabharata, Kashyapa, grandson of the universal creator Lord Brahma, married two daughters of Prajapati Daksha, Kadru and Vinata. Kadru then gave birth to the race of Naga, while Vinata gave birth to Aruna, who became the charioteer of the sun god, Surya, and also gave birth to the great eagle Garuda, who became the carrier of Vishnu. Naga Panchami is also a day when akharas, traditional Indian wrestling gyms, hold special celebrations to honor the mystical symbolism of the snake as a symbol of virility and kundalini energy.

== History ==
Indian scriptures such as Agni Purana, Skanda Purana, Narada Purana and the Mahabharata give details of history of snakes extolling worship of snakes.

In the Mahabharata epic, Janamejaya, the son of King Parikshita of the Kuru dynasty was performing a snake sacrifice known as Sarpa Satra, to avenge for the death of his father from a snake bite by the snake king called Takshaka.

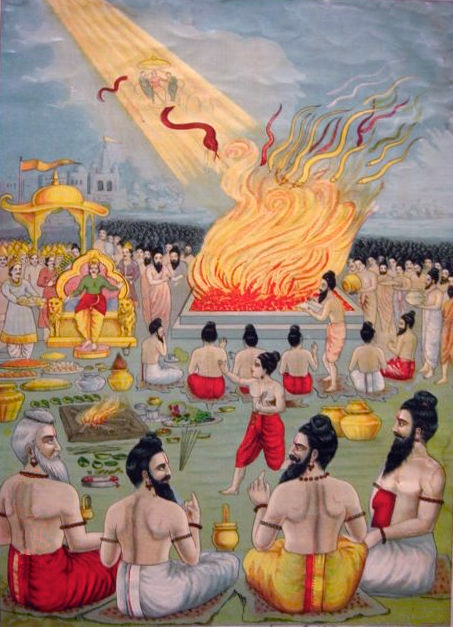
Sarpa Satra, the snake sacrifice where Astika, young Brahmin stops the yagna

A sacrificial fireplace had been specially erected and the fire sacrifice to kill all snakes in the world was started by a galaxy of learned Brahmin sages. The sacrifice performed in the presence of Janamejaya was so powerful that it caused all snakes to fall into the Yagna kunda (sacrificial fire pit). When the priests found that only Takshaka who had bitten and killed Parikshita's father and had escaped to the nether world of Indra seeking his protection, the sages increased the tempo of reciting the mantras (spells) to drag Takshaka and also Indra to the sacrificial fire. Takshaka had coiled himself around Indra's cot but the force of the sacrificial yagna was so powerful that even Indra along with Takshaka were dragged towards the fire.

This scared the gods who then appealed to Goddess Manasa, the queen of the snakes, to intervene and resolve the crisis. She then requested her son Astika to go to the site of the yagna and appeal to Janamejaya to stop the Sarpa Satra yagna. Astika impressed Janamejaya with his knowledge of all the Shāstras (scriptures) who granted him to seek a boon. It was then that Astika requested Janamejeya to stop the Sarpa Satra. Since the king was never known to refuse a boon given to a Brahmin, he relented, despite protests by the rishis performing the yagna. The yagna was then stopped and thus the lives of Indra and Takshaka and his other serpent race were spared. This day, according to the Hindu Calendar, happened to be Nadivardhini Panchami (the fifth day of the bright fortnight of the lunar month of Shravana during the monsoon season) and since then the day has been a festival day of the Naga as their life was spared on this day. Indra also went to Manasadevi and worshipped her.

According to the Garuda Purana, offering prayers to snakes on this day is auspicious and will usher good tidings in one's life. The day also carries a message of victory of good over evil, as snakes are considered divine and protective, as seen in Shesha, and Vasuki. This is to be followed by feeding Brahmins.

=== Gregorian Calendar Dates ===
Dates in the Gregorian calendar:

Last 5 Year's Nag Panchami Date's and Day : 2021: 13 August, Friday.

2022: 2 August, Tuesday.

2023: 21 August, Monday.

2024: 9 August, Friday.

2025: 29 July, Tuesday.

2026: 17 August, Monday( This Year's Nag Panchami ).

Next 5 Year's Nag Panchmi dates :

2027: 6 August, Friday.

2028: 26 July, Wednesday.

2029: 14 August, Tuesday.

2030: 4 August, Sunday.

2031: 24 July, Thursday.

== Worship ==
On the day of Naga Panchami, Naga, cobras, and snakes are worshipped with milk, sweets, flowers, lamps, and even sacrifices. Naga or serpent deities made of silver, stone, wood, or paintings on the wall are first bathed with water and milk and then worshipped with the reciting of the following mantras.

Devanagari
Romanisation (IAST)
Approximate translation

नाग प्रीता भवन्ति शान्तिमाप्नोति बिअ विबोह्
सशन्ति लोक मा साध्य मोदते सस्थित समः

Nāg prītā bhavanti śāntimāpnoti bia viboh
saśanti loka mā sādhya modate sasthitaḥ samaḥ

Let all be blessed by the Nāg [i.e. snake goddesses];
let all achieve Peace and live peacefully, without any turbulence.

अनंतं वासुकीं शेषं पद्मनाभं च कंबलम्
शंखपालं धृतराष्ट्रं च तक्षकं कालियं तथा
एतानि नव नामानि नागानाम् च महात्मन:
सायंकाले पठेन्नित्यं प्रात:काले विशेषत:
तस्य विषभयं नास्ति सर्वत्र विजयी भवेत्

anaṃtaṃ vāsukīṃ śeṣaṃ padmanābhaṃ ca kaṃbalam
śaṃkhapālaṃ dhṛtarāṣṭraṃ ca takṣakaṃ kāliyaṃ tathā
etāni nava nāmāni nāgānām ca mahātmana:
sāyaṃkāle paṭhennityaṃ prāta:kāle viśeṣata:
tasya viṣabhayaṃ nāsti sarvatra vijayī bhavet

I invoke hither, with much reverence, the nine principal Snake Deities:
Ananta, Vasuki, Shesha, Padmanabha, Kambala,
Shankhapala, Dhritarashtra, Takshaka and Kaliya.
If prayed-to daily in the morning, these illustrious Goddesses shall keep
one protected from all evils, and shall help one achieve Victory in life.

Fasting is observed on this day and Brahmins are fed. The piety observed on this day is considered a sure protection against the fear of snake bite. At many places, real snakes are worshipped and fairs held. On this day digging the earth is taboo as it could kill or harm snakes which reside in the earth.

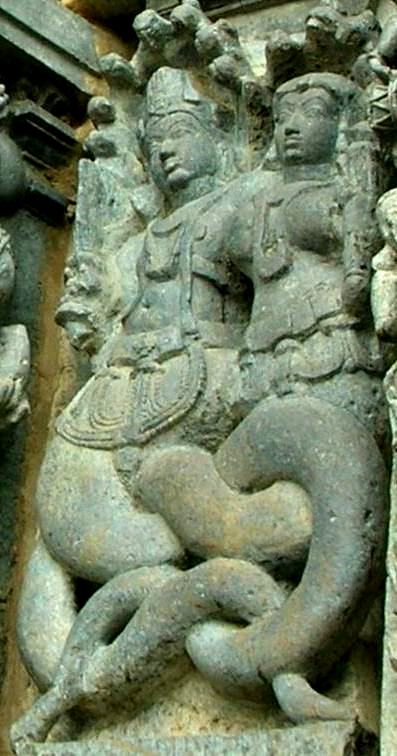
Naga in Nagalok

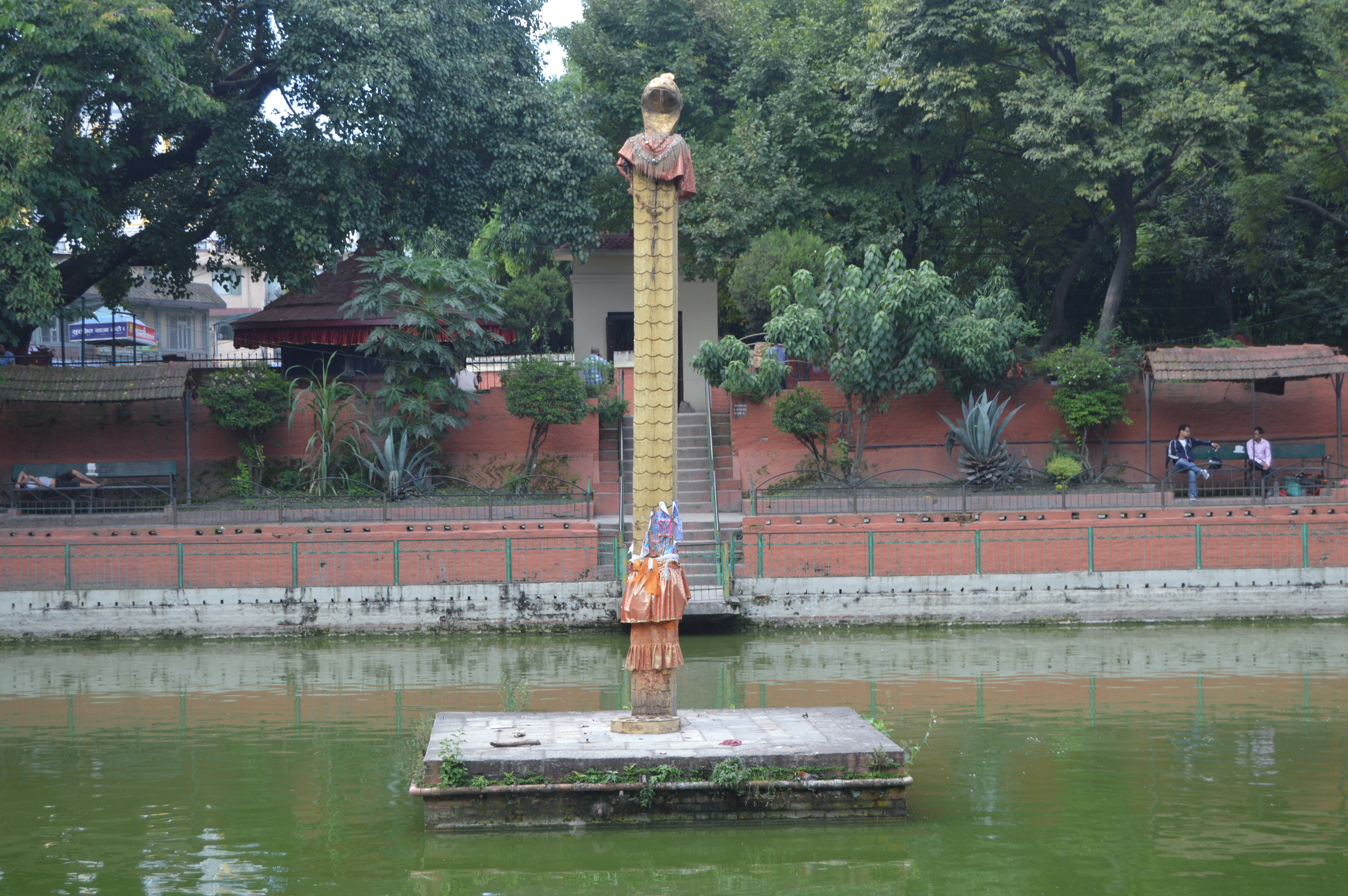
Naga at Nagpokhari, Naxal, Kathmandu

In some regions of the country milk is offered along with crystallized sugar, rice pudding. A special feature is of offering a lotus flower which is placed in a silver bowl. In front of this bowl, a rangoli (coloured design pattern) of snake is created on the floor with a brush made of wood or clay or silver or gold with sandalwood or turmeric paste as the paint. The design pattern will resemble a five hooded snake. Devotees then offer worship to this image on the floor. In villages, the anthills where the snakes are thought to reside, are searched. Incense is offered to the anthill as prayer along with milk (a myth of folk lore to feed milk to the snakes) to ensnare snakes to come out of the anthill. After this, milk is poured into the hole in the anthill as a libation to the snake god.

On this occasion doorways and walls outside the house are painted with pictures of snakes, auspicious mantras (spells) are also written on them. It is believed that such depictions will ward off poisonous snakes.

Naga Panchami is also the occasion observed as Bhratru Panchami when women with brothers worship snakes and its holes, and offer prayers to propitiate Naga so that their brothers are protected and do not suffer or die due to snake bite.

Naga Panchami is also celebrated as Vishari Puja or Bishari Puja in some parts of the country and Bisha or Visha means "poison".

== Folktales ==
Apart from the scriptural mention about snakes and the festival, there are also many folktales. One such tale is of a farmer living in a village. He had two sons and one of whom killed three snakes during ploughing operations. The mother of the snake took revenge on the same night by biting the farmer, his wife and two children and they all died. The following day the farmer's only surviving daughter, distraught and grieved by the death of her parents and brothers, pleaded before the mother snake with an offering of a bowl of milk and requested for forgiveness and to restore the life of her parents and brothers. Pleased with this offering the snake pardoned them and restored the farmer and his family to life.

In folklore, snakes also refer to the rainy season - the varsha ritu in Sanskrit. They are also depicted as deities of ponds and rivers and are said to be the embodiment of water as they spring out of their holes, like a spring of water.

== Regional traditions ==
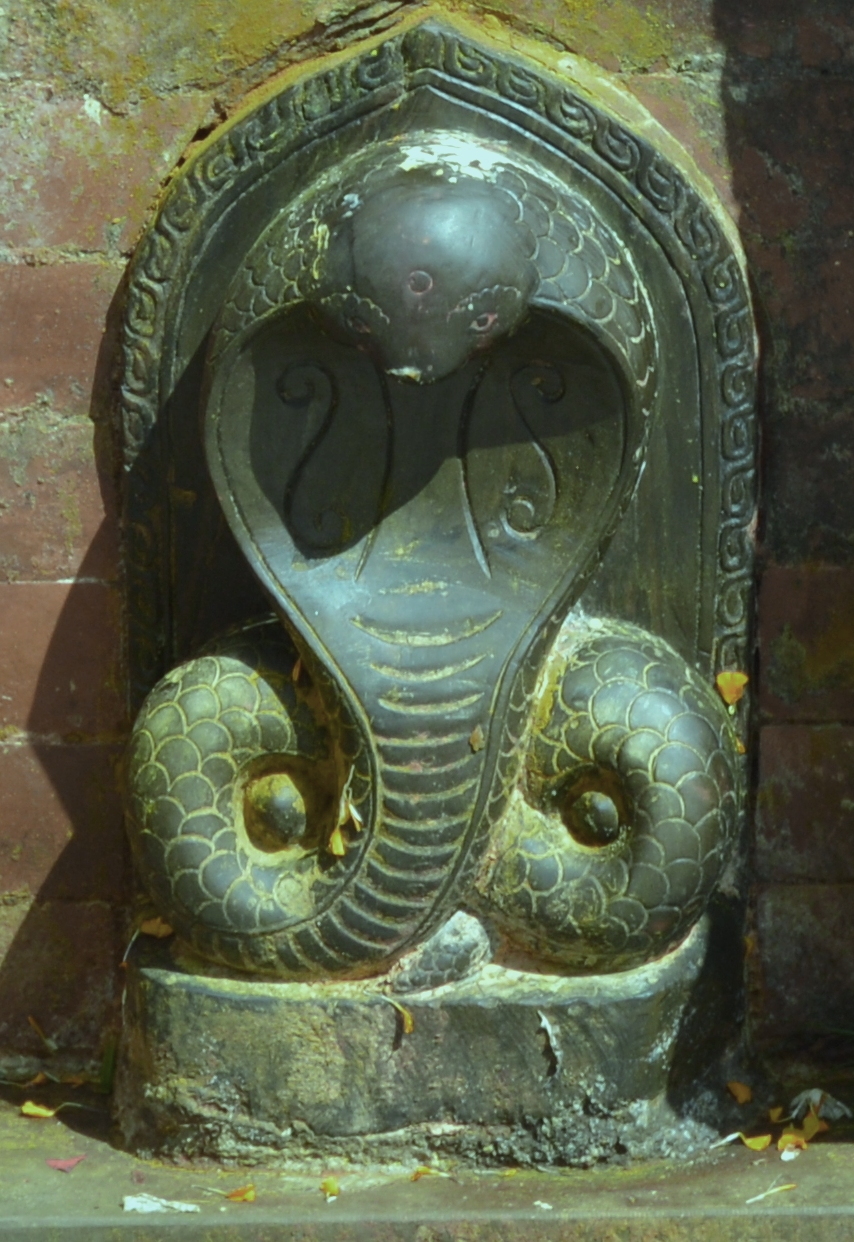
Naag or serpent

As it is believed that snakes have more powers than humans and on account of its association with Shiva, Devi, Vishnu and Subramanya, a degree of fear is instilled resulting in deification of the cobra and its worship throughout the country by Hindus.

Snake has connotation with the Moon’s nodes known in Hindu astrology. The head of the snake is represented by Rahu ("Dragon's head") and its tail by Ketu ("Dragon's tail"). If in the zodiacal chart of an individual all the seven major planets are hemmed between Rahu and Ketu in the reverse order (anticlockwise) it is said to denote Kalasarpa dosha (Defect due to black snakes), which forebodes ill luck and hardship in an individual's life and therefore appeased by offering worship to the snakes on Naga Panchami day.

=== Central India ===
In Central India, in Nagapur, Maharashtra State snakes have special identity. The name of the city is derived from the word Naga which means snake as the place was infested with snakes. Nagapur was the homeland of 'Naga' people who embraced Buddhism, supported it with great efforts in its early period, and propagated it throughout India. Nagaoba Temple in Mahal is where worship is offered on Naga Panchami day; the temple was found under the neem tree known as “Nagaoba ka vota", under a platform. Another important event held on this occasion is an arduous trekking pilgrimage known as Nagadwar Yatra to Pachmarhi. On this occasion food prepared as offering to the snake god is cooked in a kadai.

==== Naga Chandreshwar Ujjain ====
This is a sub temple located in the third floor of Mahakaleshwar Jyotirlinga temple in Ujjain. The speciality of this shrine is it is open only one day of the year on Naga Panchami day and remains shut on the rest of the year. The murthy of Nagachandreshwar is unique with Shiva and Parvati seated on ten hooded snake surrounded by Nandhi Ganesha and other murthies. It is believed that the great snake Taksha lives here and praying during Naga Panchami rids the devotee of various afflications and doshas such as Naga Dosha, Sarpa Dosha and any form of Doshas.

=== North and Northwestern India ===
Naga Panchami is celebrated all over North India. In Kashmir, from historical times snakes have been worshipped by Hindus, and the places of worship are reported as 700.

In north western India, in cities such as Benares, it is the time when Akharas (venues of wrestling practice and competitions) as part of Naga Panchami celebrations are bedecked; on this occasion the ahkaras are cleaned up thoroughly and walls painted with images of snakes, priests preside, and the gurus are honoured along with the sponsors. Its significance is that the wrestlers stand for virility and Naga symbolizes this “scheme of virility”. Akharas are decorated with snake images showing snakes drinking milk.

In Narasinghgarh akhara in Varanasi there is special shrine dedicated to Naga Raja (King of Snakes) where a bowl is suspended above the image of the snake and milk is poured into it so that it trickle over the snake god as a form of an offering.

On this day snake charmers are everywhere in towns and villages displaying snakes in their baskets which will have all types of snakes such as pythons, rat snakes, and cobras mingled together. Some of the snake charmers hang limp snakes around their neck and crowds gather to witness these scenes. The snakes in the basket are also worshipped on the occasion.

However, in Punjab this festival is celebrated in a different month and in a different format, in the month of Bhadra (September–October) and is called Guga Nauvami (ninth day of lunar month during bright half of Moon). On this occasion an image of snake is made with dough and kept in a “winnowing basket” and taken round the village. Villagers offer flour and butter as oblation to the image. At the end of the parade, the snake is formally buried and women worship the snake for nine days and give offering of curds.

=== Western India ===
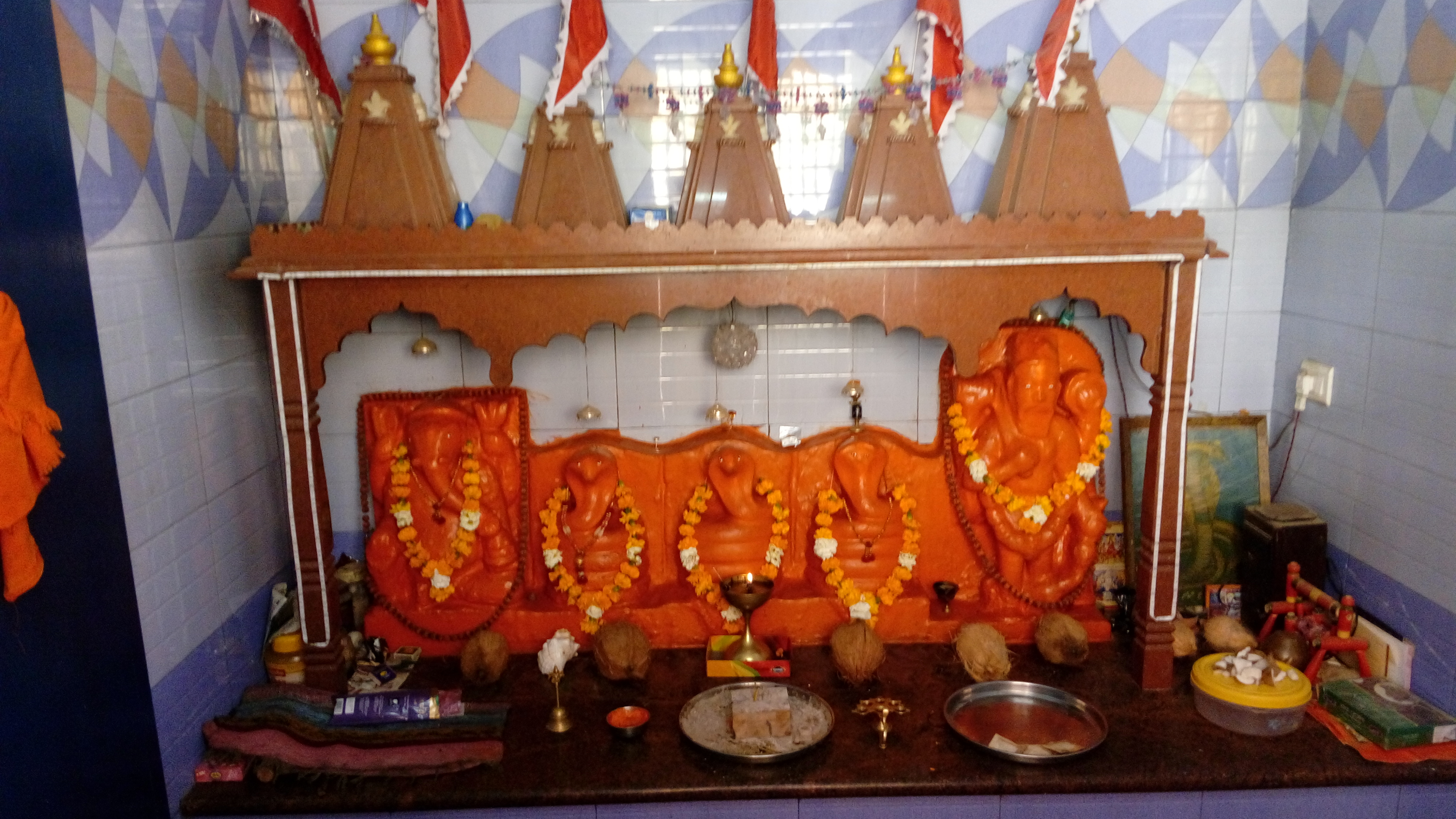
Deity of Bhujang Naga Temple

As in the rest of the country, the Naga Panchmi is celebrated in Western India and is known as the Ketarpal or Kshetrapal, meaning, a protector of his domain.

In this part of the country, snake is named Bhujang, which is also the Sanskrit name for snake, in the Kutch region. The name is attributed to the city of Bhuj which is located below the hill named Bhujiya, after Bhujang, as it was the abode of snakes. On top of this hill there is a fort known as the Bhujia Fort where a temple has been built for the snake god and a second temple is at the foot of the hill known as Nani Devi.

Bhujia Fort was the scene of a major battle between Deshalji I, the ruler of Kutch and Sher Buland Khan, Mughal Viceroy of Gujarat who had invaded Kutch. It was the early period of Deshalji's reign. When the army of Kutch was in a state of losing the battle, a group of Naga Bawas opened the gate of Bhujia Fort by a clever ploy of visiting Naga temple for worship and joined the fray against Sher Buland Khan's army. Eventually Deshalji I won the battle. Since that day Naga Bawa and their leader have a pride of place in the procession held on Naga Panchami day.

Within the fort, at one corner, there is a small square tower dedicated to Bhujang Naga (snake god), who in folklore is said to have been the brother of SheshNaga. It is said Bhujang Naga came from Than of Kathiawar and freed Kutch from the oppression of demons known as daityas and rakshasas. The Snake Temple was also built at the time of the fortification of the hill during Deshalji I's reign and provided with a chhatri. Every year on Naga Panchami day a fair is held at the temple premises. In the Sindhi community Naga Panchami is celebrated in honour of Gogro.

=== Eastern and Northeastern India ===
In eastern and north eastern States of India such as West Bengal, Jharkhand Orissa and Assam, the goddess is worshipped as Manasa. According to the Hindu mythology, Manasa is a snake goddess who was also called Jaratkaru and wife of Brahmin sage also named Jaratkaru. On this occasion, sh twig of manasa so sale plant (euphorbia lingularum) symbolizing the goddess Manasa is fixed on the ground and worshipped, not only in the month of Shravan, as in the rest of the country, but also in the month Bhadra Masa. Festival is held within the precincts of the house.

=== South India ===
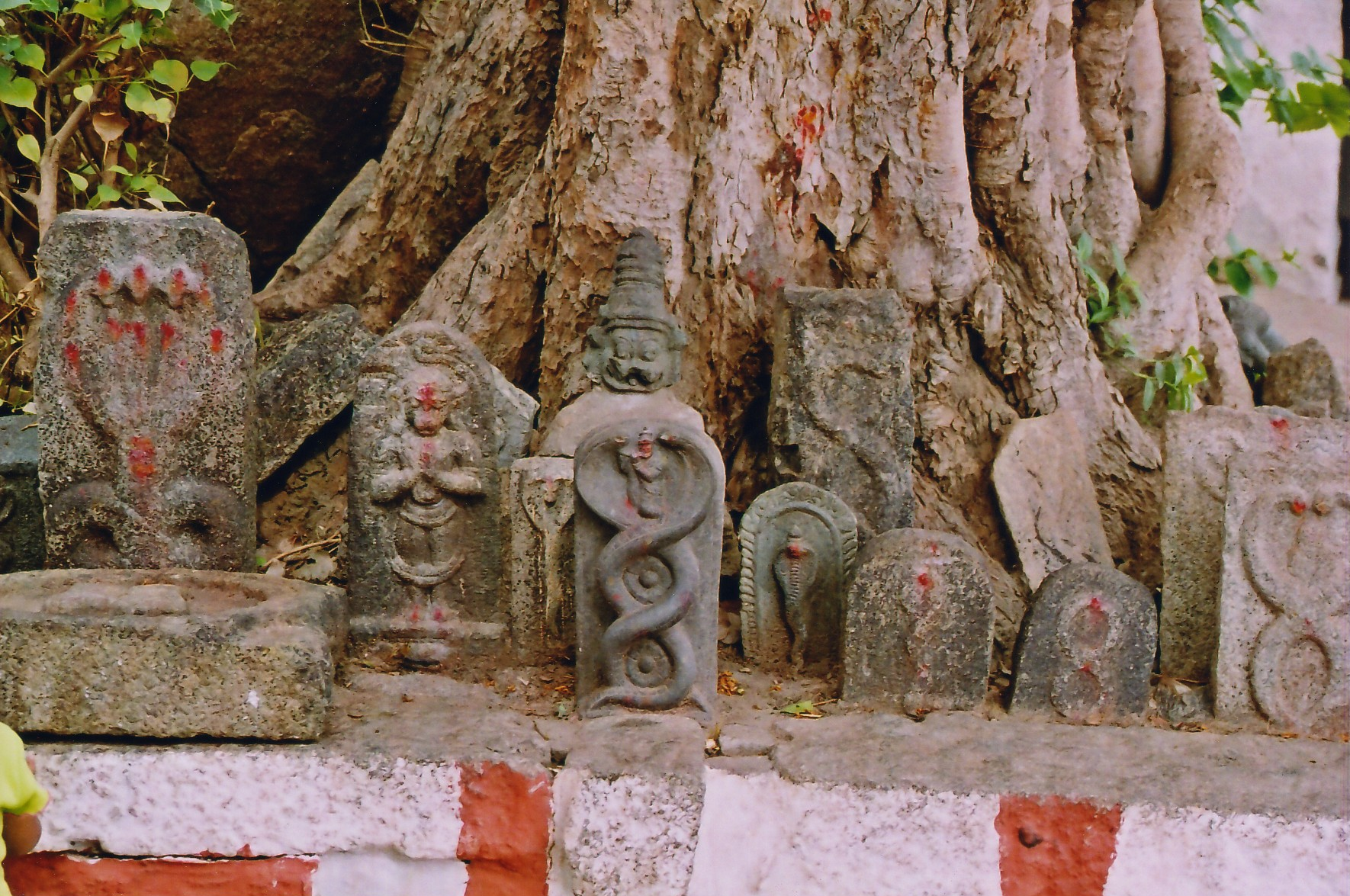
Stone statues of snakes worshipped in South India

In South India, snake is identified with Subramanya (Commander of the celestial army) and also with Shiva and Vishnu.

In Karnataka, the preparation for the festival starts on the New Moon day of Bhimana Amavasya, five days prior to the festival day of Panchami. Girls offer prayers to the images made out of white clay painted with white dots. They take a vow by tying a thread dipped in turmeric paste on their right wrist and offer prayers. An image of snake is drawn on the floor in front of the house and milk is offered as oblation. On the night previous to the festival they keep complete fast or take a salt free diet. After the pooja, a food feast is held.

In South India, both sculpted and live snakes are worshipped. Every village has a serpent deity. It is worshipped as a single snake or nine snakes called Nava Naga but the popular form is of two snakes in the form of an “Aesculapian rod”. Every worshipper in South India worships the anthill where the snakes are reported to reside. Women decorate the anthill with turmeric paste and vermillion and sugar mixed with wheat flour. They bedeck it with flowers with the help of threads tied to wooden frames. In Maharashtra, they go round the anthill in a worship mode five times singing songs in praise of snake gods.

Another form of worship practiced by women, who have no children for various reasons, install stone statues of snakes below the peepal tree and offer worship seeking blessings of the snake god for bestowing them with children. This is done as it is believed snakes represent virility and have the gift of inducing fecundity curing barrenness.

In Coorg in Karnataka, an ancestral platform called noka is installed with rough stones which are believed to be the ancestral incarnation in the form of snakes but they are not necessarily worshipped on Naga Panchami day.

In Kerala, Ezhavas and Nairs are Serpent-worshipers. A shrine is normally established for snake god at the southwest corner of the ancestral house, along with temple for the para-devata. . For Naga Panchami day, Women fast the previous day. They then on the Naga Panchami Day, take bath at dawn and pray at the tharavad Sarpa kavu. They take the Thirtham milk home. A Chembarathi (Hibiscus) flower is dipped in the milk and sprinkled on the brother's back and then do an arthi. Then a thread dipped in turmeric is tied on the right wrist of the brother. After that a feast is served.

== Observance in Nepal ==
Hand drawn Nag Panchami poster above the main door of a Nepali house in the United States

The ritual is widely observed in Nepal, particularly for the fight between Garuda and a great serpent.

In the Changu Narayan Temple in Kathmandu, there is statue of Garuda which is said to have been established by Garuda himself and on the Naga Panchami day the image is said to sweat reminiscing his great fight with a giant snake; people collect the sweat and use it for curing leprosy.

Nepali diaspora communities have also taken the ritual outside of Nepal to different countries of their settlement.

== Observance in Pakistan ==
Sindhis, ethnic group found predominantly in Pakistan, celebrate Naga Panchami by honouring Gogro, a mythical character that protects against snake bites.

== See also ==
- Jangam
- Jogi (caste)
- Nagaradhane
- Snake handling
- Snake worship
