= Kamrupi dholiya =

Kamrupi Dhuliya are traditional folk drummers from Undivided Kamrup district who play large and wide big drums called Bor Dhul mostly in ethnic festivals, traditional wedding or especially folk religious traditions of aboriginal Saivitie or Sakti cults mostly. It is a part of the native culture of the Kaibarta-Jalkeot community of Lower Assam.

Though associated with playing the Bor Dhul, they are also known for mixing traditional Martial Acrobatic skills during the act. Spontaneity of expressions and quickness of mind and feet were the hallmarks of Kamrupi Dhuliya's. Drumming is accompanied by songs and other skills sometimes.

The Bor Dhul make a deep low-pitched tribal drumming sounds and is mostly played by the indigenous Kaibarta-Jalkeot ethnic group of Lower Assam (a marginalized aboriginal community of Assam) and the cultural traditions related with the Kamrupi Dhulia like Deodha-Joki, Bah Puja, Mas Mara, Xomor Kola (native Martial Acrobatics) etc. are intrinsically a part of the Kaibarta ethnic culture.

== See also ==
- Kamrupi Lokgeet
