= Naag Pokhari =

17th century pond in Kathmandu, Nepal

- नाग पोखरी (Nepali)
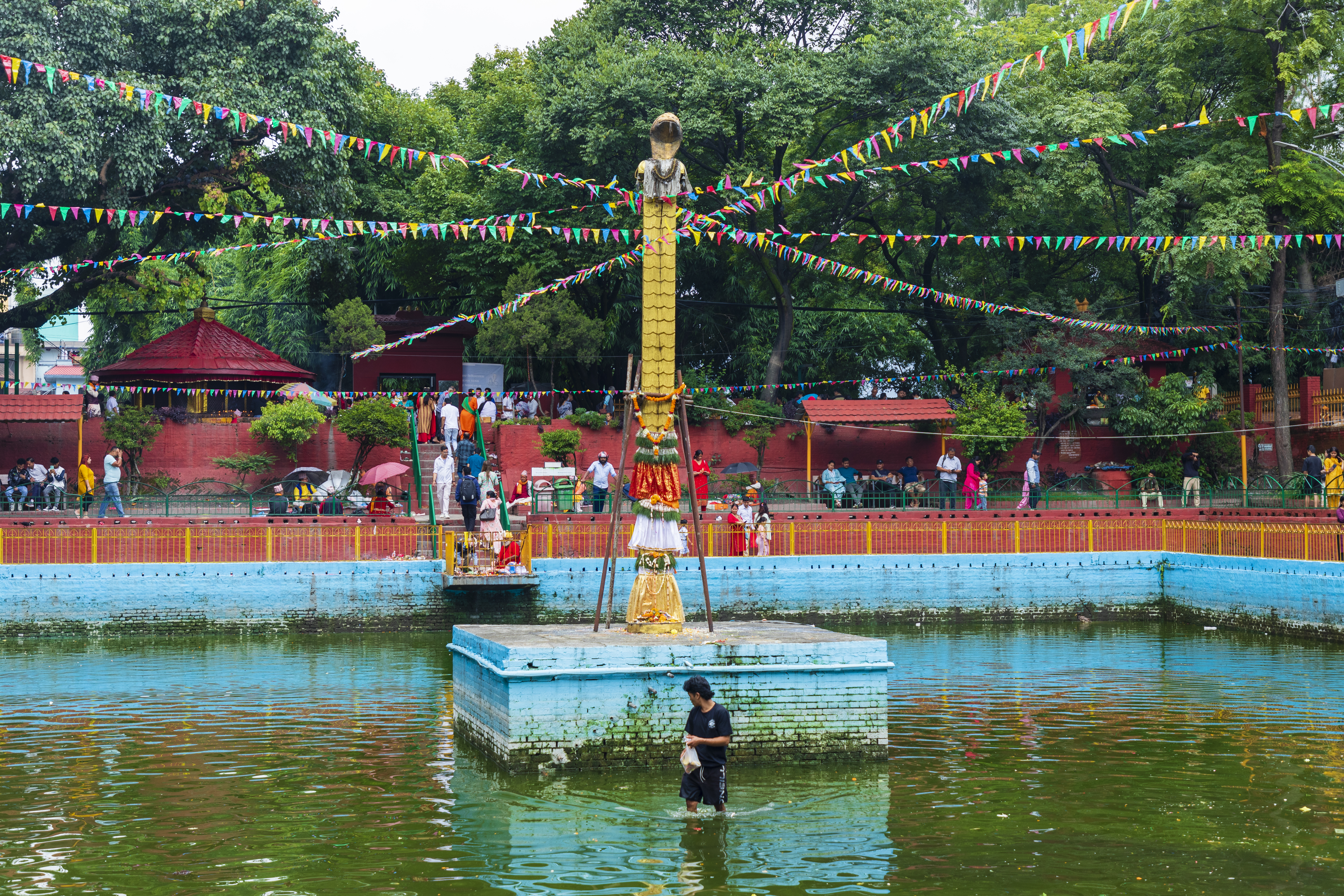
- Naag Pokhari

- Location of Naag Pokhari in Nepal
- Location: Kathmandu, Nepal
- Coordinates: 27.71346°N 85.32342°E
- Type: Pond
- Max. length: 125 feet (38 m)
- Max. width: 65 feet (20 m)
- Average depth: 7 feet (2.1 m)

Naag Pokhari (Nepali: नाग पोखरी) meaning snake's pond is a historic artificial pond located in the eastern side of the royal palace, Kathmandu. The pond was constructed in the 17th century by Queen Subarna Prabha.

The pond is 125 ft (38 m) long, 65 ft (20 m) wide and has a depth of about 7 ft (2.1 m) ft. It has a park around it. A tall statue of golden snake is mounted at the center of the pond. The pond is used to celebrate Naga Panchami and has religious significance for the Hindus.

== Gallery ==
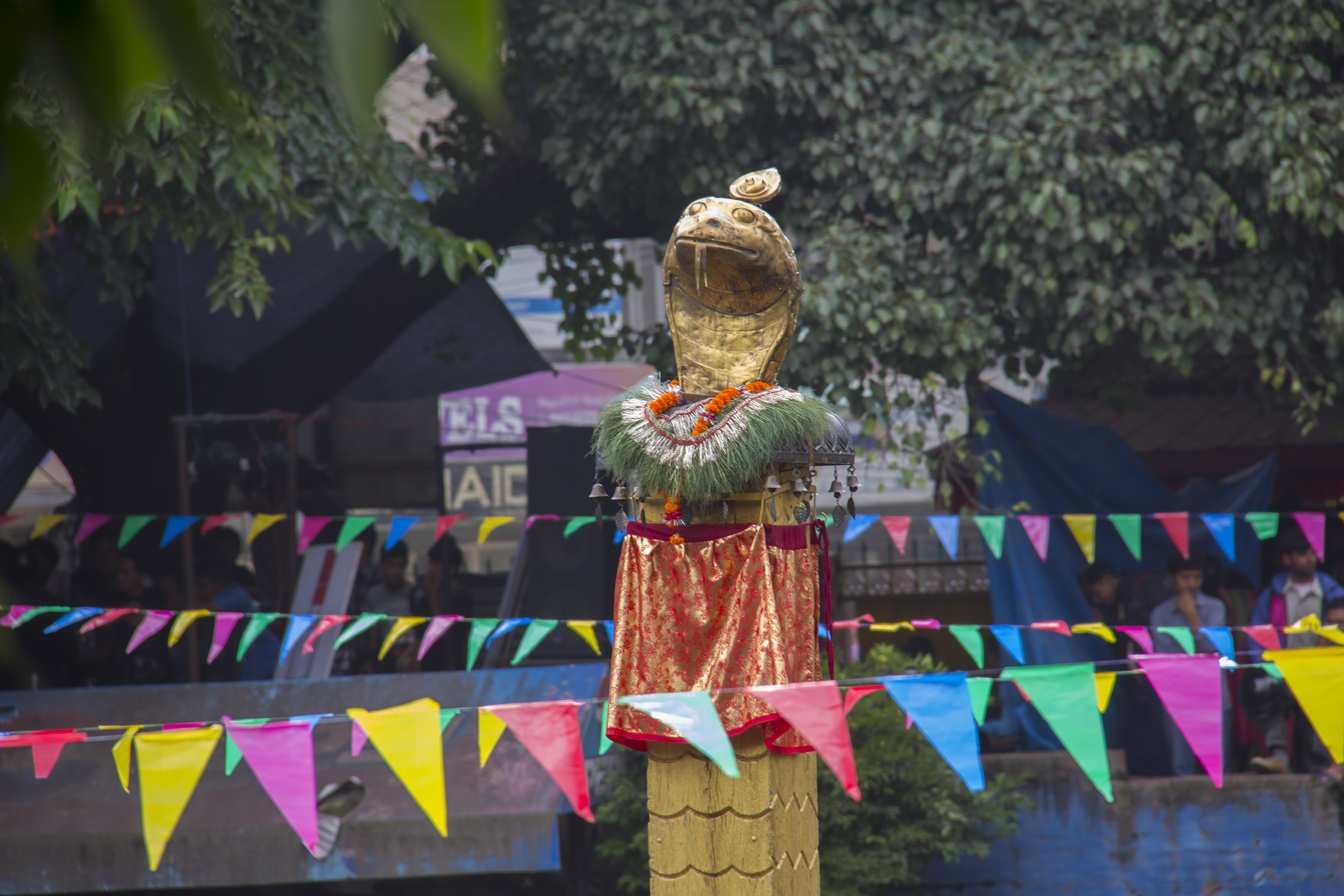

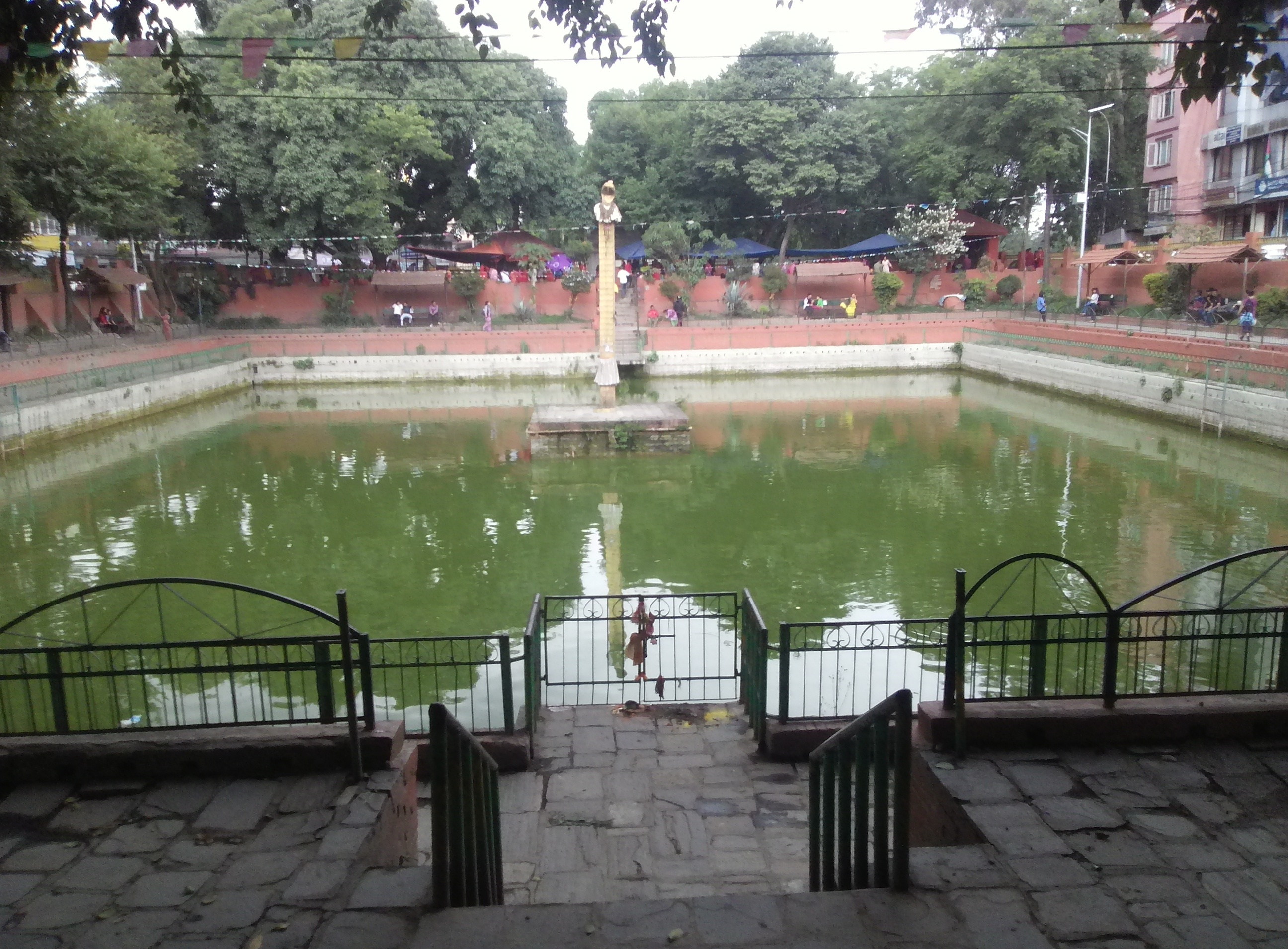

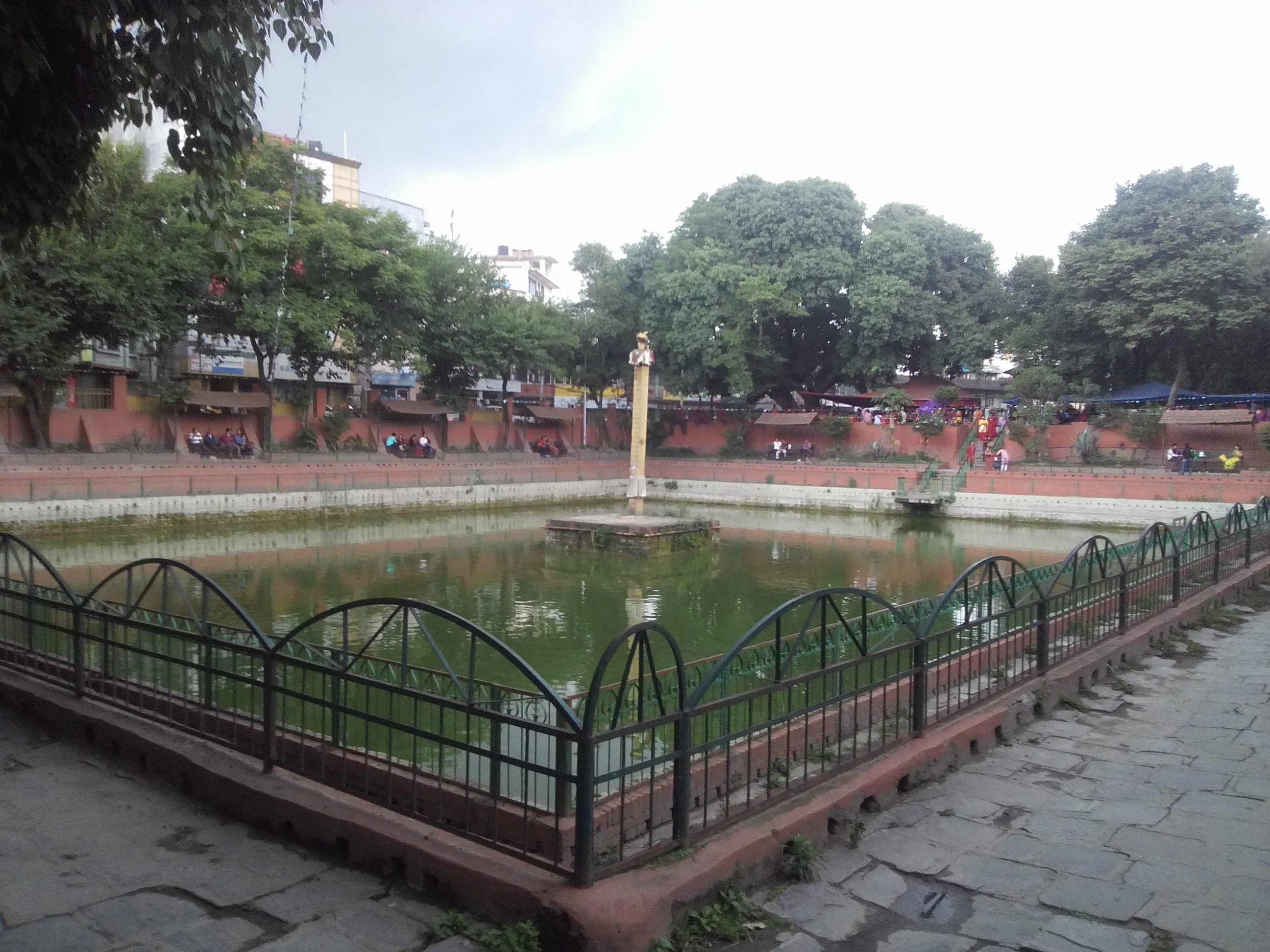

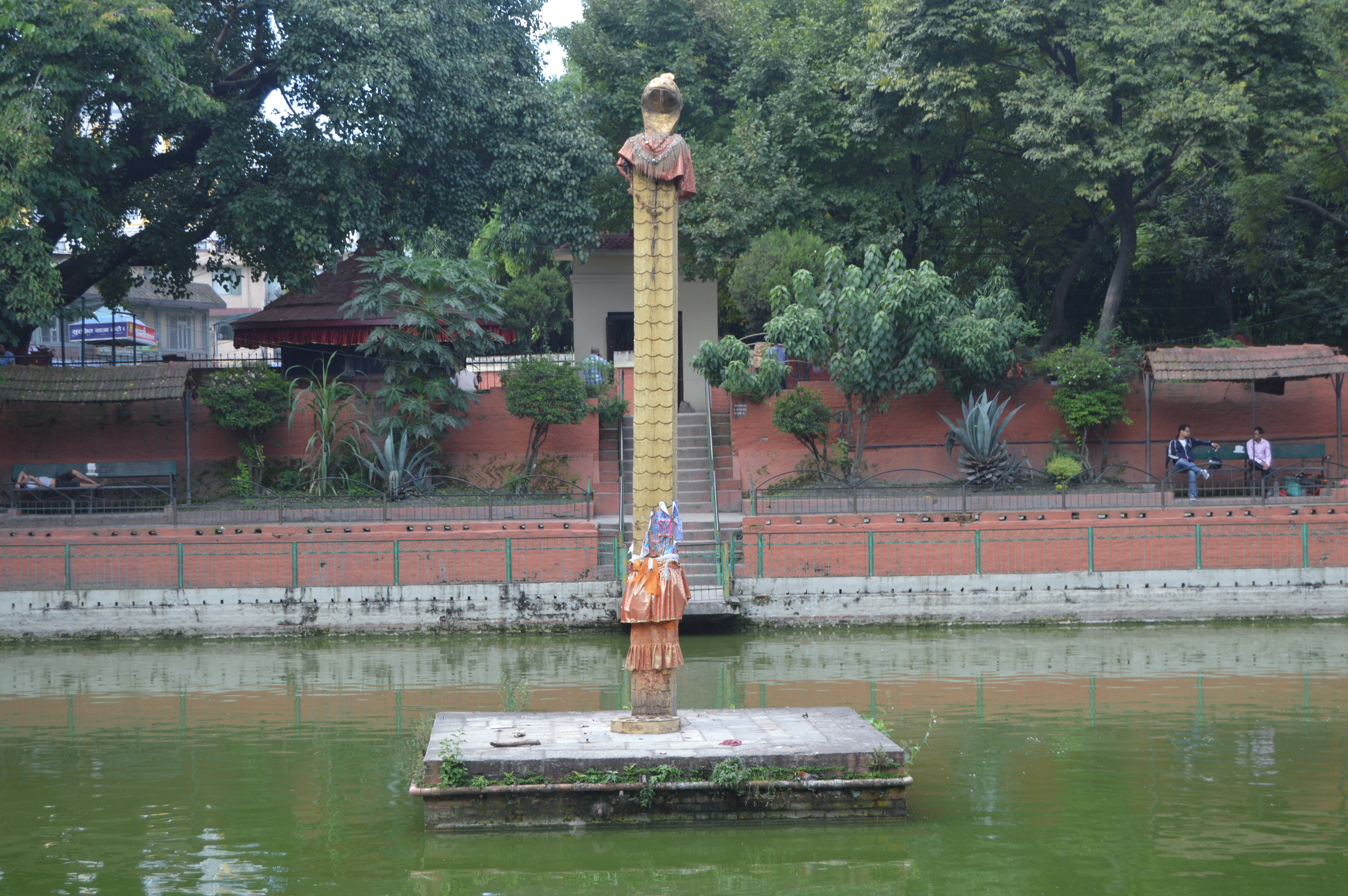
