= Gogro =

Character in Sindhi folklore

Gogro is a mythical character venerated by Sindhis to protect against snake bites.

== Worship ==
Sindhis celebrate Nag Panchami by honouring Gogro. Traditionally, in Sindh, whenever the snake charmer brought snakes, they were given some Dakhshina (alms) and also milk for the snakes. The folklore of Gogro comes from Kutch and Gujarat.

== Origins ==
In Thatta, near Pir Pitho, there was a kingdom of king Gopichand. The King's daughter, Vachhalbai, saw a flower flowing in the river. She got the flower with her friend's help. A saintly person's soul lived in that flower. As Vachhalbai smelled the flower, the soul entered her stomach. After a few months the king came to know about pregnancy of his daughter and was also told about the incident.

However, the King knew no one would believe the story. He therefore, asked four of his soldiers to take Vachhalbai in a chariot and leave her in a deserted jungle. On the way, one ox was bitten by a snake and the soldiers could not proceed with one only ox.

At this point, Vachhalbai heard a voice emanating from her stomach: "Mother, chant this mantra and sprinkle water on the dead ox." Vachhalbai and the soldiers were surprised but they did what they were told, and the ox recovered immediately. The soldiers saluted Vachhaalbai with respect and left her in the deserted place.

In time Vachhalbai gave birth to a child who was called 'Gogro'. When he cried in hunger, all the snakes used to collect there to feed him in turn with their poison. This poison gave strength to the child, who with his power dug a ditch and produced a spring of water. Gogro used to play with snakes and drink their poison.

One day a Rajput king's caravan passed by. The Rajput king was dying of thirst. Gogro gave him water on the condition that he must leave seven boys to live in the jungle. In order to save his life, king Chawan left seven boys there.

Feeding the seven boys proved to be difficult. Gogro started taking more poison from the snakes. This created a discontent among the snakes and a small snake 'Han Khanu' was determined to kill Gogro; but it had a very little poison. The great python 'Ajgar' gave poison to him. The cobra said that it is a sin to kill our master. Further, he said that if Han Khanu killed Gogro, he would devour Han Khanu. Since that time the biggest of snakes - python - has no poison and the cobra wherever it sees Han Khanu devours it.

Gogro had such a power that if he turned his eyes to the place where a snake bit, the whole poison evaporated. That is why the Han Khanu bit Gogro on his jaw where Gogro could not see the place. While dying Gogro said to his friends "When I die you cook me and eat me up." His friends cut him in two pieces and cooked him but did not feel like eating. So they threw the full pot in the river. Some thieves got hold of this pot and ate all the pieces. As Gogro's realised soul went into their stomach they also become realised souls and their third eye opened up, through which they could see the future. These thieves were called 'Mamooyoon Fakirs'. Many references are made to this by Dr.Gurbaxani in his poems.

Before Mahatam Gogro died he told all his friends not to bite the people without a reason and also told the people to consider snakes as their friends.
