= Kamrupi literature =

Kamrupi literature is the literature written in the modern Kamrupi dialects of Assamese language.

== Legends ==
The story of Behula and Chand Sadagar appears to be common to both Bengal and Kamarupa. The ballads connected with this story must have been current in western Kamarupa and the rest of northern Bengal long before the verses were reduced to writing by Sukavi Narayan in the thirteenth century and by Durgabar in the early part of the sixteenth century.

The ballads of Sukavi Naravan's composition are still sung in Kamrup and they are known as Suk Nanis or Suk-Narayanis to this day. Sukavi Narayan was very likely a poet of Kamarupa who described the sea-voyages of a Kamrupi trader named Chand Sadagar whose home was in Chaygaon in modern Kamrup, on the south bank of the Brahmaputra but, strangely enough, both Sukavi Narayan and Chand Sadagar have been claimed as natives of Bengal. The songs of Durgabar are still known as Durgabari.

== Further development ==
There is much controversy as to the authorship and date of a work known as Dipiki Chanda. Internal evidence points to the compilation of the work after the death of Sankara Deva. The author is said to have been a king called Purusottama Gajapati. Several Assamese writers have attempted to locate him somewhere in Assam but all have failed to notice the fact that Purusottama Gajapati was a well-known powerful king of Odisha who ruled from 1476 to 1497 A.D. and whose kingdom, or rather empire, extended from the Hugli district in modern Bengal as far as the Guntur district of the Andhra Pradesh. He was the son of Kapilendra Gajapati and the father of Pratapa Rudra, the last powerful Gajapati who ruled from 1497 to 1541 A. D. and who was a contemporary of Sri Chaitanya. Purusottama Gajapati was a devout Vaisnava and he may have written the work known as Dipika Chanda in order to ridicule the later Buddhist sect and the Tantrik system. There was close connection between Kamarupa and Odisha in the sixteenth century on account of the existence, in the latter country, of the famous temple of Jagannatha at Puri. It is possible that an Kamrupi Vaisnava came across the book and translated it into Kamrupi verse. The title Gajapati could not have been assumed by an ordinary king. It was assumed by Kapilendra, the father of Purusottama, who possessed, according to the Muslim account Burhan-i-maasir, two hundred thousand war elephants.

== Preservation of literary material ==
The Assam Government collection of Sanskrit and Assamese manuscripts now deposited in the library of the Kamarupa Anusandhan Samiti, includes quite a good number of works. These are mostly works on astronomy, astrology, mathematics, proverbs, riddles, mantras, medicine, history or traditions and also tantras.

== Nature of literary work ==
The Yuddha Jayanava Dasa, Jyotisha Chakra, Jataka Chandrika, Kerali, Jyotisha Darpan, Jyotisha Ratnamala and the Jyotisha Muktavali are all astrological works pertaining to preparation of horoscopes. The Mantra Prakasa and the Mandaladhyaya are Tantrik works. The Samudrika is a treatise on palmistry. The Shatachakra by Purnananda Paramahamsa is also a Tantrik work dealing with astral physiology.

Besides the above there are numerous works on Hindu religion and religious rites based upon the Smrita Sastras of the works in the vernacular language of Kamarupa the most important are Bhamvati, an astrological work by Kaviraj Chakravarti, the Ghora Nidana, a treatise on horse and treatment of equine diseases, Gukarati, a collection of mantras to ward off charms practised by Tantrik Buddhists who defy the authority of the Vedas, the Hara-Gauri Sambada, an important book which, like the Yogini Tantra, gives, in the guise of prophesies, the history of ancient Kamarupa, the Jyotish Churamani by Churamani Kayastha, a work on Arithemetic and land-Surveying, the Kamratna Tantra," an Assamese translation of a Tantrik work of that name ascribed to Gorakshanath, a celebrated Buddhist Siddha who flourished in the fourteenth century and the Kitabata Manjari by Bakul Kayastha written in Saka 1356 equivalent to 1434 A.D. This last named work is a poetical treatise on arithmetic, Surveying and book-keeping. The book teaches how accounts are to be kept under different heads and how stores belonging to the royal treasury are to be classified and entered into a stock-book.
