= Mahalakshmia jo sagro =

Mahalakshmia jo Sagro (Sindhi: مَھالڪشميءَ جو سڳڙو / महालक्ष्मीअ जो सॻड़ो) is a festival observed by Sindhi Hindus. It is dedicated to the, Mahalakshmi, the goddess of wealth, prosperity, and good fortune.

The festival is observed in August or September, depending on the Hindu lunar calendar. It lasts for sixteen days, beginning on the eighth day of the Shukla Paksha (waxing lunar fortnight) of the month of Bhadrapada and concluding on the eighth day of the Krishna Paksha (waning lunar fortnight) of the same month.

Observances include fasting and the tying of a sacred thread, known as sagro around the wrist. One the final day, devotees perform a puja to Mahalakshmi, after which the scared thread is untied.

Shodasha Mahalakshmi Vrata

This festival is also celebrated as Shodasha Mahalakshmi Vrata is a sixteen-day religious observance dedicated to the Hindu goddess Mahalakshmi celebrating her sixteen divine forms. It begins on Bhadrapada Shukla Ashtami, the eighth day of the waxing lunar fortnight. The same lunar date is also observed as Radhashtami, and consequently the beginning of the Mahalakshmi Vrata coincides annually with Radha Ashtami. The vrata traditionally continues until the Ashtami of the following waning lunar fortnight.

During the observance, devotees worship Mahalakshmi over a period of sixteen days. Traditional descriptions of the vrata prescribe the preparation of a sacred thread made from sixteen threads and tied with sixteen knots, which is worn on the arm. Mahalakshmi is worshipped daily until the concluding Ashtami, when an udyapana, or concluding ceremony, is performed and the sacred thread is removed.

The sixteen-day Mahalakshmi Vrata is observed in India and is also known in Nepal. Regional traditions differ in their specific rituals and terminology.
