= Sindh Literature Festival =

Annual literary festival in Pakistan

Sindh Literature Festival Sindhi: سنڌ ادبي ميلو
- SLF
- Status: active
- Genre: Festival
- Frequency: Annually (2 Days)
- Venue: Beach Luxury Hotel Karachi (2016 - 2019); Arts Council of Pakistan Karachi (2022) – 2023); Liaquat Memorial Library Karachi (2024 - 2024)
- Location: Karachi
- Country: Pakistan
- Years active: 2016-present
- Inaugurated: 2016
- Founder: Naseer Gopang; Zohaib Kaka
- Most recent: 03-04-05 March 2023
- Next event: 14–15 December 2024
- Attendance: approx. 9,450 (2016); 15,123 (17); 34,312 (2019); 50,920 (2021); 70,002 (2021); 90,592 (2022); 95,000 (2023)
- Leader: Naseer Gopang & Zohaib Kaka
- Organiser: Sindh Literary Foundation (2016 - Present)
- Sponsor: Endowment Fund Trust & Government of Sindh
- Website: https://sindhliteraturefestival.com

Sindh Literature Festival or Sindh Adabi Melo (Sindhi: سنڌ ادبي ميلو) is an annual two-day festival that aims to promote and preserve the heritage of Indus while bring up social change through the celebration of indigenous languages, arts, history, education, archaeology, and anthropology. First held in 2016, the festival provides a platform for both established and emerging intellectuals to connect with their fans and engage in meaningful discussions.

The festival brings together a diverse array of participants, including literary figures, progressive writers, journalists, political leaders, labor leaders, lawyers, social experts, as well as wildlife, human, women, and trans rights activists, environmentalists, artists, and students from across Pakistan. as well as international delegates. In addition to its cultural and literary significance, the event serves as a venue for formulating policies aimed at social progress and protecting the region's cultural and indigenous assets. The Sindh Literature Festival plays a vital role in preserving region's cultural identity and contributing to the broader discourse on literature, heritage, and societal development.

Along with live coverage, a variety of stories, reports, programs, and packages are also produced. A number of TV channels and newspapers publish news and columns. Different sessions including book launches and discussions on various topics, theater, music, and mushaira are also planned over the course of three days.

== Background ==
Naseer Gopang and Zohaib Kaka are both journalists who are in charge of the festival. SLF was founded by Naseer Gopang and Zohaib Kaka is the festival advisor and managing director.

== History, timeline ==
=== 2016 ===
The festival was first held in November 2016 at Beach Luxury Hotel Karachi. A number of prominent public figures have participated in the event including Sufi singers Abida Parveen, Saif Samejo, Amb Jogi, journalists Hamid Mir, Wusatullah Khan, politicians Raza Rabbani, Ayaz Latif Palijo, Sassui Palijo, Aitzaz Ahsan, actresses Sanam Baloch, Sabreen Hisbani and others.

=== 2017 ===
The second event was held in 2017 from 27–29 October at Beach Luxury Hotel Karachi. The event comprises a number of sessions that aim at highlighting the social issues of Sindh, Sindhi Culture, issues related with Sindhi language, developments in Sindhi literature. Book stalls, handicraft stalls, mushaira sessions, and musical sessions of folk singers are also arranged during the event.

=== Controversy ===
In 2017, during Sindh Literature Festival, Jaleel read a story خدا گم ٿي ويو (Khuda gum thee wayo, The God disappeared). Video of the session went viral on social media in March 2021. The video irked religious fundamentalists and they took his views as blasphemy of God. Jaleel and organisers was threatened to death by religious extremists. His opponents used Twitter and other social media networks to get him arrested and hanged publicly. While his supporters showed solidarity with him.

=== 2019 ===
For the third time festival was jointly organised by the Sindh Literary Foundation, information department of the Sindh government and the Endowment Fund Trust from 22–24 February 2019 at Beach Luxury Hotel Karachi as in previous events. This time festival had many sessions on culture, language, politics, sufism and literature. Karachi's past was one of the main discussions of event.

=== 2021 ===
Annual gathering scheduled in March 2020 was canceled due to the COVID-19 pandemic, then it was scheduled from 12 to 14 March 2021 in Arts Council of Pakistan Karachi.

=== 2022 ===
Fifth SLF held from 18–20 March 2022, under the theme Centennial Celebration of Mohen-jo-Daro in Arts Council of Pakistan Karachi. The 5th Sindh Literature Festival (SLF) was organized from 18 to 20 March 2022, at the Arts Council of Pakistan, Karachi. This event was attributed to the “Mohenjo-Daro” of Sindh as the Centennial Celebration of the discovery of Mohenjo-Daro, an ancient archaeological site of immense historical significance in the world. For the occasion, a special theme song Mohenjo-Daro was prepared to sing the glory of this prehistoric city of Indus Civilization, written by renowned Sindhi poet Ali Akash, and composed by musician Saad Alavi. The opening ceremony of SLF started with this song, received well and cheered by the audience.

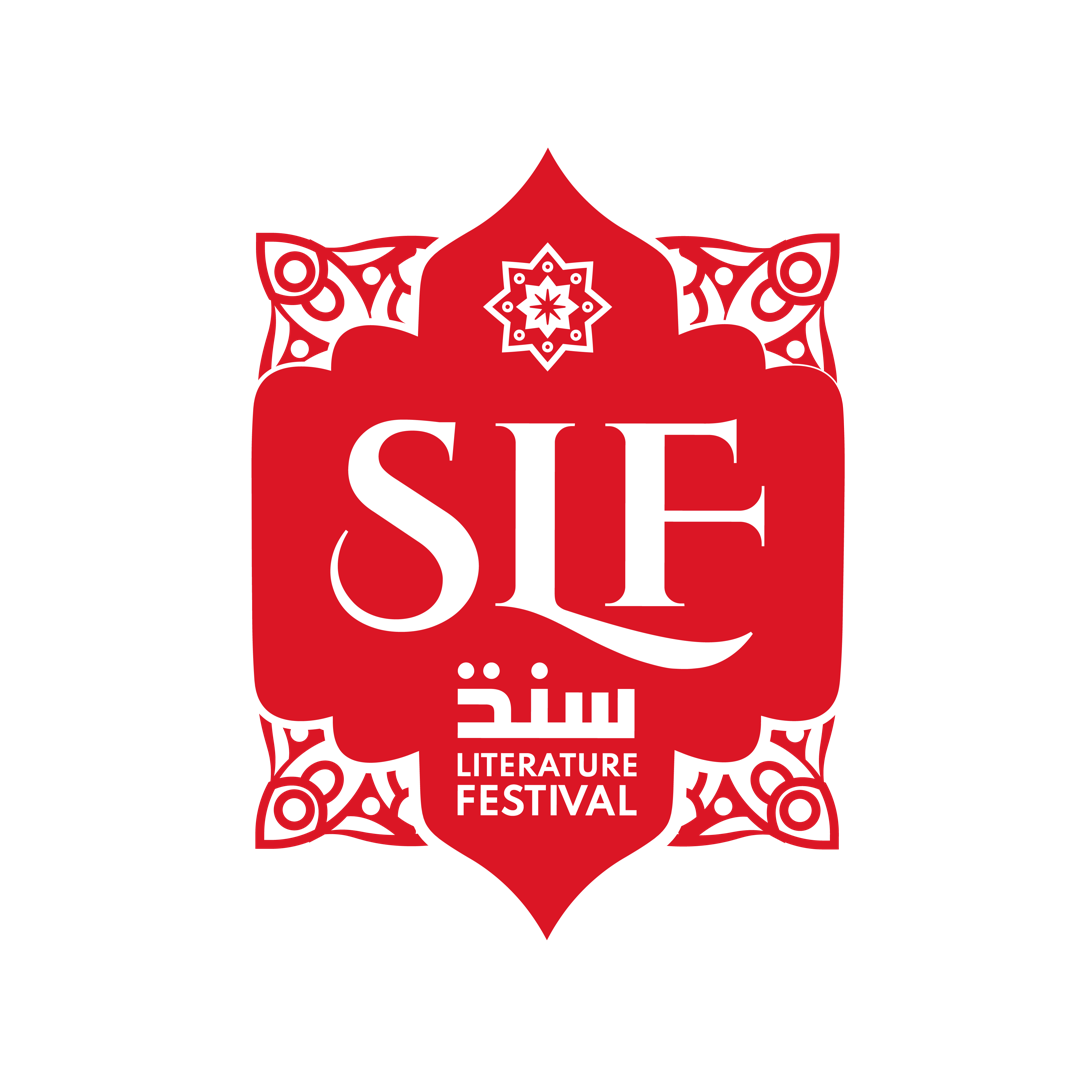
Old Logo of SLF (Before Dec 2023)

The main stage of the 5th Sindh Literature Festival was also designed to represent the importance of Mohenjo-Daro. In the 5th SLF, 28 sessions were conducted on various themes including a special session regarding the splendor “Mohenjo-Daro”, in which archaeologists from Pakistan and abroad participated; ten books were launched; and a “multilingual” Mushaira, a poetic sitting participated by poets of different languages of all provinces of Pakistan, was also part of the event. Besides that, two musical nights added the aroma of the festivity to the program. The festival was attended by a large number of people of all ages especially families and youth. The event was covered remarkably by print, electronic and social media. On the 1st day, an international session was held.

=== 2023 ===
Naseer Gopang and Zohaib Kaka, the Managing Director of SLF, announced the saving dates for the 6th Sindh Literature Festival on social media. It is scheduled to take place on March 3, 4, and 5, 2023. 6th SLF is focusing on the topic of "Aalam Sabh Abaad Kareen" in order to raise public awareness about global warming and climate change. The Festival will be included sessions, music, arts, and other festivities.

=== 2024 ===
The 7th Sindh Literature Festival (SLF) will take place on December 14 and 15, 2024, at the Liaquat Memorial Library in Karachi. This year's theme is "Save Indus, Save Life." The festival will feature sessions about the Indus River and include a special poetry recital to honor its cultural and historical importance. The event aims to raise awareness about the river's significance to the region's ecology, economy, and heritage.
