= Wusatullah Khan =

Wusat Ullah Khan
- وسعت اللہ خان
- Born: 01-01-1962; Rahim Yar khan
- Occupations: Journalist, columnist, talk show host
- Years active: 1979-present
- Employer(s): BBC Urdu, Dawn News
- Notable work: Sailab Diaries (2010), Baat say Baat (BBC Urdu column), Zara Hut Kay (Dawn News talk show)

Wusat Ullah Khan Urdu: وسعت اللہ خان is a Pakistani journalist, columnist and host. Has been associated with BBC Urdu since 1991. He authored a book on the 2010 Pakistan floods named Sailab Diaries (Flood Diaries). He is also a co-host of a talk-show Zara Hut Kay for Dawn News.

== Works ==
- Sailab Diaries, a book on the 2010 Pakistan floods
- Baat say Baat, a weekly column for the BBC Urdu
- Zara Hut Kay, a daily talk show co-hosts for Dawn News
