= Glossary of Hinduism terms =

The following list consists of notable concepts that are derived from Hindu culture and associated cultures’ (Indian, Nepali, Balinese) traditions, which are expressed as words in Sanskrit or other Indic languages and Dravidian languages. The main purpose of this list is to disambiguate multiple spellings, to make note of spellings no longer in use for these concepts, to define the concept in one or two lines, to make it easy for one to find and pin down specific concepts, and to provide a guide to unique concepts of Hinduism all in one place.

Separating concepts in Hinduism from concepts specific to Indian culture, or from the language itself, can be difficult. Many Sanskrit concepts have an Indian secular meaning as well as a Hindu dharmic meaning. One example is the concept of Dharma. Sanskrit, like all languages, contains words whose meanings differ across various contexts.

== A ==
Arti
Hindu ritual for welcoming someone.
Abhisheka
Hindu bathing ritual offered to someone who is worshipped.
Acharya
Hindu religious expert in any field.
Adharma
Something against Dharma.
Advaita
non-dual, such as in Advaita Vedanta Philosophy.
Agastya
Hindu sage.
Agni
Fire god.
Ahamkara
Sanskrit term for "ego".
Ahimsa
A religious principle of non-violence and respect for all life. Ahimsa (अहिंसा ahiṁsā) is Sanskrit for avoidance of himsa, or injury. It is interpreted most often as meaning peace and reverence toward all sentient beings. Ahimsa is the core of Hinduism, Jainism, and Buddhism. Its first mention in Indian philosophy is found in the Hindu scriptures called the Upanishads, the oldest dating about 800 BC. Those who practice Ahimsa are often vegetarians or vegans.
Akshaya Tritiya
Annual spring festival for Hindus and Jains.
Añjanā
Mother of Hanuman.
Antahkarana
Totality of mind.
Antyesti
Last death ritual.
Ashram
Hindu monastery.
Asura
A semi-divine, power-seeking being.
Ashvins
Hindu twin gods for medicine, health and science.
Ashvatthama
The son of Drona.
Aruna
The charioteer of Surya the Sun God.
Aryan
Group of Vedic people.
Astika
Orthodox (of Indian religions/schools of thought).
Atman
Self or spirit.
Aupasana
Yajna performed during a Hindu wedding.
Avarna
A person not belonging to any class in Varna system.
Avatar
Material appearance or incarnation of a deity on earth.
Ayurveda
A medical system of Indian subcontinent.

== B ==
Bajrang Bali
Other name of Hanuman.
Bhagavad Gita
A knowledge of the attaining the supreme told to Arjuna by Krishna on the Kurukshetra battlefield.
Bhagavan
Bhagavan is a term used to refer to a God.
Bhagavata
Worship of Bhagavat Vishnu.
Bhagavati
A word for female Hindu deities.
Bhajan
A Hindu devotional song as a spiritual practice.
Bhakti
A Hindu word for faith, devotion or love to god.
Bharat
India, and also used as a male name.
Bharata
Brother of Rama.
Bhargava
The descendants of the great rishi, Bhrigu.
Bhasmasura
Ancient legendary character in Hinduism.
Bhavana
Sense for calling into existence.
Bhumi
Earth goddess
Brahma
The Creator God.
Brahmaloka
The celestial abode of Brahma.
Brahmacharya
The first phase of a person's life where he goes to live with his guru to learn the different studies.
Brahman
The Supreme Transcendental Awareness which pervades and yet transcends the manifest universe. Not to be confused with the god Brahma or the varna Brahmin.
Brahmin
The class or varna of people consisting of priests, teachers, sages, and gurus.
Brahma Sutras
Sanskrit texts attributed by Sage Vyasa.
Brahmastra
Supernatural weapon as per Hindu texts.
Braj
Region associated with Radha and Krishna.
Buddhi
Intelligence or soul.

== C ==
Catur Sloki
Four most important verses among Hindu texts.
Chakra
Focal points in body activated during meditation.
Charu
Pure and spiritual person.
Chyavana
A great Bhargava rishi.
Chiranjivi
One who is immortal.
Chitta
Mind and its fluctuations.
Chintan
A peaceful mantra or smaran.

== D ==
Daitya
A race of Asuras.
Dakini
Female spirit of demon as per Hindu mythology.
Dāna
Virtue of generosity.
Dasharatha
Father of Rama.
Dashavatara
The series of 10 Avatars of Vishnu.
Deva
Term for deity in Hinduism.
Devi
Term for female deity in Hinduism.
Dharma
Following the divine and great path.
Dharmaśāstra
Hindu theological texts in Sanskrit.
Dhritarashtra
Father of Kaurava.
Dhyana
Meditation.
Dhaumya
A great sage who had three disciples – Aruni, Upamanyu and Veda.
Dilīpa
Hindu king of Ikshvaku dynasty.
Dhruva
Ascetic devotee of Vishnu.
Drona
Guru (or teacher) of Kauravas and Pandavas.
Dvaita
A branch of Hindu philosophy, founded by Shri Madhvacharya that advocates dualism and stresses a strict distinction between God and souls.
Dyaus
Rigvedic god of the aether and sky

== E ==
Ekalavya
Young Nishada prince and character in Mahabharata.
Ekayāna
Oneness of god in Hinduism.
Elapatra
A character in the Sarpa Satra.

== G ==
Gandhara
Ancient Indian Mahajanapadas.
Gandhari
Wife of Dhritarashtra and mother of Kaurava.
Gandhari people
Ancient Hindu tribes in Mahabharata.
Gandharva
Rigvedic tribe.
Ganesha
The god of new beginnings, wisdom, and luck, commonly identified for his elephant head.
Ganga
A holy river in Northern India, believed to be a goddess by Hindus (see Ganga in Hinduism).
Gayatri Mantra
A revered mantra in Hinduism, found in the Yajur Veda.
Ghanta
Metal bell used during Hindu worship ritual.
Gita
holy text/song/book, typically Bhagavad-gita, and many including Anugita, Ashtavakra Gita, Avadhuta Gita, Devi Gita, The Ganesha Gita, Gita Dhyanam, Gita Govinda, Guru Gita, Hamsa Gita, Yogi Gita.
Goloka
Spiritual abode of Radha Krishna.
Gopi
Milkmaids of Braj region who are revered as the consorts and devotees of Krishna.
Gotra
Ancestral lineage among Hindus.
Grahana
Eclipse in Hindu mythology.
Grihastha
The second of the four phases (Purushartha) of a man, when a person gets married and settles down in life and begets children.
Guru
A spiritual teacher. In contemporary India, the title and term "Guru" is widely used within the general meaning of "wise man".

== H ==
Hanuman
A vanara who helped Rama, the seventh avatar of Vishnu, in rescuing his wife Sita from the Rakshasa king Ravana.
Hindu scripture
Sacred texts of Hinduism mostly written in Sanskrit. Hindu scripture is divided into two categories: Śruti – that which is heard (i.e. revelation) and Smriti – that which is remembered (i.e. tradition, not revelation).
Hinduism
A worldwide religious tradition that is based on the Vedas and is the direct descendant of the Vedic religion. It encompasses many religious traditions that widely vary in practice, as well as many diverse sects and philosophies.

== I ==
Indra
The supreme God of Vedism; the primary deity of the Rigveda and national god of the Vedic Aryans. He is the king of the gods and is associated with weather, war, and sovereignty. He is also the Lord of Svargaloka.
Idandra
The esoteric name of Indra/God in Vedic philosophy referenced in the Aitareya Upanishad. It translates to "the perceiver of all this" or "one who sees this." It represents the pure power of observation, divine illumination, and the ultimate realization of the Self.
Ishvara
A Hindu philosophical concept of God referring to the Supreme Being which is the lord and the ruler of everything. Hinduism uses the term Ishvara exclusively to refer to the Supreme God in a monotheistic sense.

== J ==
Japa
A spiritual discipline in which a devotee repeats a mantra or the name of God. The repetition can be aloud, just the movement of lips or in the mind.
Jiva
A living being.
Jivanmukta
A liberated living individual.
Jnana
Knowledge.
Jnana Yoga
Knowledge Yoga.

== K ==
Kailasha
The celestial abode of the destroyer deity, Shiva.
Kali
Kaivalya: Independence (a goal in Yoga Sutra).
Kali
A dark, black aspect of the mother-goddess Devi whose consort is Shiva.
Kali Purusha
The demonic and evil personification of Kali Yuga.
Kali Yuga
Last of four yugas in Hindu cosmology.
Kalki
The tenth avatar of Vishnu who is yet to come and will appear as a man on a horse at the end of Kali Yuga.
Kama
Best understood as aesthetics, the definition of Kama involves sensual gratification, sexual fulfillment, the pleasure of the senses, love, and the ordinary enjoyments of life regarded as one of the four ends of man (purusharthas).
Karma
A Sanskrit term that encompasses the entire cycle of cause and effect.
Karma Yoga
The practise of disciplining action. Karma yoga focuses on the adherence to duty (dharma) while remaining detached from the reward. It states that one can attain Moksha (salvation) by unselfishly doing his duties.
Kartikeya
A god born out of a magical spark created by Shiva, his father. God of war, victory, and knowledge.
Krishna
The eighth avatar of Vishnu, one of the most worshipped by many Hindus. Krishna is famous for his lecture to Arjuna written in the Bhagavad Gita.
Krishna Paksha
15 days after purnima (full moon) day to Amavasya (new moon) day
Kshatriya
The class or varna in Hindu tradition, consisting of the warriors, soldiers, and rulers of society.
Kshira Sagara
The ocean of milk, an abode of Vishnu.
Kubera
One of the gods of wealth and riches.
Kumbha Mela
a huge Hindu religious pilgrimage/gathering/festival every 12 years at the Ganges and other sacred rivers, which many sanyasis (especially sadhus) attend.
Kurma
The second avatar of Vishnu where he took the form of a tortoise.

== L ==
Lakshmi
Goddess of prosperity, wealth and good fortune. She is the consort of Vishnu and an aspect of Devi.

== M ==
Mahabharata
One of the two major ancient Sanskrit epics of India, the other being the Ramayana. The Mahabharata is of religious and philosophical importance in India; in particular, the Bhagavad Gita, which is one of its chapters (Bhishmaparva) and a sacred text of Hinduism.
Mahacharya
Honorific spiritual title meaning "great teacher", used in Hinduism, Buddhism, and Jainism.
Maharishi
A great enlightened one or seer including ancient gurus/teachers/writers and speakers/poets/singers of sacred literature, especially the Vedas.
Manas
Root for Indo-European words such as mind
Mandir
Temple.
Manidvipa
Abode of the supreme goddess in Shaktism.
Mantra
A religious syllable or poem, typically from the Sanskrit language. They are primarily used as spiritual conduits, words, and vibrations that instill one-pointed concentration in the devotee. Other purposes have included religious ceremonies to accumulate wealth, avoid danger, or eliminate enemies. Mantras are performed through chanting.
Mātali
The charioteer of Indra.
Matsya
The first avatar of Vishnu, where he came in the form of a fish.
Mitra
One of the Adityas.
Moksha
Refers to liberation from the cycle of death and rebirth. In higher Hindu philosophy, it is seen as a transcendence of phenomenal being, of any sense of consciousness of time, space, and causation (karma).
Mount Meru
A sacred mountain.: Muscular Hinduism: A movement to increase Hindu physical fitness.

== N ==
Naraka
Realm of punishment, the abode of Yama.
Narasimha
The fourth avatar of Vishnu. He is a mixed form of a man and a lion.
Nastika
Unorthodox (such as Dharmas which claim anatman).
Nirvana
Literally "extinction" and/or "extinguishing", is the culmination of the yogi's pursuit of liberation. Hinduism uses the word nirvana to describe the state of moksha, roughly equivalent to heaven.

== O ==
Om
("Om", also Aum, ॐ) is the most sacred syllable in Hinduism, first coming to light in the Vedic Tradition. The syllable is sometimes referred to as the "Udgitha" or "pranava mantra" (primordial mantra); not only because it is considered to be the primal sound, but also because most mantras begin with it.

== P ==
Paramukta
A supremely liberated living individual
Parashurama
The sixth Avatar of Vishnu, where he came in the form of an axe-wielder to kill the corrupt kings at the time.
Parvati
Goddess of power and devotion, the consort of Shiva and mother of Ganesha.
Patala
The netherworld.
Pativrata
The conjugal fidelity of a wife towards her husband.: Phalguna: One of the months of the Hindu calendar.: Pitrs: The spirits of departed ancestors.
Prabhamandala (or Siras-cakra)
The head halo, or aureoles, of a Hindu deity (see also Halo (religious iconography)).
Prabhavali
The full-body halo, or aureoles, of a Hindu deity.
Pralaya
Phenomenon of dissolution.
Purana
Any of many Hindu legend/mythology texts.
Purushartha
The four chief aims of human life. Arranged from lowest to highest, these goals are sensual pleasures (kama), worldly status and security (artha), personal righteousness and social morality (dharma), and liberation from the cycle of reincarnation (moksha).

== R ==
Radha
Hindu goddess of love and devotion. Radha is the chief consort of god Krishna who resides in Goloka. She is also revered as the avatar of Lakshmi.
Rama
The Seventh Avatara of Vishnu. The life and heroic deeds of Rama are written in the Sanskrit epic, The Ramayana.
Ramayana
Part of the Hindu smriti, written by Valmiki. This epic of 24,000 verses in seven kandas (chapters or books) tells of a Raghuvamsa prince, Rama of Ayodhya, whose wife Sita is abducted by the rakshasa Ravana.
Rishi
An enlightened one or seer.
Ṛta
The vedic principle of natural order which regulates and coordinates the operation of the universe and everything within it.
Rudra
A Rigvedic god of the storm, the hunt, death, nature and the wind. Rudra is an early form of Shiva and a name of Shiva in the Shiva sahasranama.
Rukmini
The Hindu goddess of fortune. The chief wife of the Hindu deity Krishna, an avatar of Lakshmi.
Ruru
The son of Pramati and grandson of Chyavana. He married Pramadvara, granddaughter of Vaivasvata Manu.

== S ==
Sadhana
Spiritual exercise by a Sadhu or a Sadhaka to attain moksha, which is liberation from the cycle of birth and death (Samsara), or a particular goal such as blessing from a deity.
Samadhi
A term used in yogic meditation. Samadhi is also the Hindi word for a structure commemorating the dead.
Samkhya
A school of philosophy emphasising a dualism between Purusha and Prakrti.
Samsara
Refers to the concept of reincarnation or rebirth in Indian philosophical traditions.
Samudra Manthana
The legend of the churning of the ocean.
Sanatana Dharma
The Eternal Order/Truth/Law (An endonym of Hinduism).
Sannyasa
Hindu ascetic/monastic (monk or nun) such as a Sanyasi, Sadhvine or Sadhu, Swami.
Satyabhama
is the Hindu Goddess and third queen of Krishna she is the personification of the goddess Bhumi and one of the incarnations of Lakshmi.
Saraswati
The goddess of education and knowledge, and consort of Brahma.
Shakta
A Hindu denomination which follows the Bhagavati/Devi/Shakti (Goddess).
Shakti
An aspect of Devi and a personification of God as the Divine Mother who represents the active, dynamic principles of feminine power.
Shiva
God of destruction, birth, death, time, and the arts; the Supreme Being/Ultimate Reality in Shaivism. A form of Ishvara or God in Shaivism. Śiva is commonly known as "the destroyer" and is the third god of the Trimurti.
Sīmābandha
(Sanskrit सीमाबन्ध, literally “boundary, edge + bounded”) a restriction in access to a specific area, often for training &/or purification in esoteric Hinduism (and Buddhism).
Sita
The wife of Rama, a Vishnu's seventh avatar.
Shudra
The class or varna in Hindu tradition, consisting of farmers, servants, and laborers.
Shukla Paksha
15 days after Amavasya (new moon) day to Purnima (full moon) day
Sloka
A verse of lines in Sanskrit, typically recited as a prayer.
Smarta
A Hindu denomination, which follows Advaita philosophy and considers that all gods are manifestations of Ishvar.
Smriti
A newer/secondary canon of Hindu texts/scriptures including auxiliary Vedic texts, epics, Dharma Sutras & Shastras, Artha Shastras, Puranas, poetry, reviews/commentary, digests.
Śruti
A canon of Hindu scriptures. Shruti is believed to have no author; but rather a divine recording of the "cosmic sounds of truth", heard by rishis.
Sthala purana
A regional account of a temple legend.
Sthala Vriksha
A sacred tree associated with a temple.
Stotra
devotional hymn/song/mantras to a deva/devi.
Śūnyatā
(शून्यता, romanized: śūnyatā), translated most often as "emptiness",[1] "vacuity", and sometimes "voidness",[2] or "nothingness"; a philosophical concept. Within Hinduism, Jainism, Buddhism, and other philosophical strands, the concept has multiple meanings depending on its doctrinal context. It is either an ontological feature of reality, a meditative state, or a phenomenological analysis of experience.
Sutra
Refers to an aphorism or a collection of such aphorisms in the form of a book or text.
Svarga
The celestial abode of the devas.
Svayambhu
The concept of self-birth or self-manifestation.

== T ==
Tantra
The esoteric Hindu traditions of rituals and yoga. Tantra can be summarised as a family of voluntary rituals modeled on those of the Vedas, together with their attendant texts and lineages.
Theertham
literally refers to water. In Hindu sacred literature, it is referred to as the physical holy water body associated with a temple or deity.
Torana
(Sanskrit: तोरण; [tawr-uh-nuh]) is a free-standing ornamental or arched gateway for ceremonial purposes in Hindu, Buddhist and Jain architecture of the Indian subcontinent. Toranas can also be widely seen in Southeast Asia and parts of East Asia; Chinese Shanmen gateways, Japanese Torii gateways, Korean Iljumun and Hongsalmun gateways, Vietnamese Tam quan gateways, and Thai Sao Ching Cha was derived from the Indian Torana. They are also referred to as vandanamalikas.

== U ==
Upanishad
Part of the Hindu Śruti scriptures which primarily discuss meditation and philosophy, seen as religious instructions by most schools of Hinduism.

== V ==
Vaikuntha
The celestial abode of the preserver deity, Vishnu.
Vaishya
The class or varna in Hindu tradition consisting of merchants, traders, artisans, and landowners.
Vamana
The fifth Avatara of Vishnu. He is the first Avatar of Vishnu which had a completely human form, although it was that of a dwarf brahmin.
Vanaprastha
A person who is living in the forest as a hermit after giving up material desires.
Varaha
The third avatar of Vishnu, who came in the form of a boar.
Varna
Varna, according to Hindu scriptures, refers to the classification of people based on their qualities. The term is derived from the Sanskrit word, vr, which means "to describe," "to classify" or "to cover."
Varuna
A god of the sky, of rain and of the celestial ocean, as well as a god of law and of the underworld.
Vasu
Group of eight deities associated with fire and light.
Vayu
The god of air and wind who is also father of Bhima and Hanuman.
Veda
Collectively refers to a corpus of ancient Indo-Aryan religious literature that is considered by adherents of Hinduism to be revealed knowledge. Many Hindu believe the Vedas existed since the beginning of creation.
Vedanta
Vedic Philosophy.
Vijnana
Mind or knowing The Divine.
Vishnu
God of Preservation. A form of God, to whom many Hindus pray. For Vaishnavas, He is the only Ultimate Reality or God. In Trimurti belief, He is the second aspect of God in the Trimurti (also called the Hindu Trinity), along with Brahma and Shiva. Known as the Preserver, He is most famously identified with His avatars, especially Krishna and Rama.
Vrata
Fast.

== Y ==
Yajna
A Vedic ritual of sacrifice performed to please the Devas, or sometimes to the Supreme Spirit Brahman. Often it involves a fire, which represents the god Agni, in the center of the stage and items are offered into the fire.
Yajnopavita
Sacred thread worn by Hindus, especially by Brahmin after the rite of Upanayana.
Yama
The lord of death in Hinduism, first recorded in the Vedas.
Yamas
A yama (Sanskrit), literally translates as a "restraint", a rule or code of conduct for living virtuously.
Yamuna
A sacred Hindu river goddess and the fourth queen of Krishna, she is considered one of the incarnations of Lakshmi.
Yantra
A geometric picture, typically holy/religious.
Yoga
Philosophy of spiritual practices performed primarily as a means to Liberation. Traditionally, Karma Yoga, Bhakti Yoga, Jnana Yoga, and Raja Yoga are considered the four main yogas. In the West, yoga has become associated with the asanas (postures) of Hatha Yoga, popular as fitness exercises.
Yogamaya
A goddess, regarded to be the embodiment of the divine energy of Vishnu.
Yoga Sutra
One of the six darshanas of Hindu or Vedic schools and, alongside the Bhagavad Gita and Hatha Yoga Pradipika, are a milestone in the history of Yoga.
Yuga
In Hindu philosophy (and in the teachings of Surat Shabd Yoga) the cycle of creation is divided into four yugas (ages or eras).
Yuga Dharma
One aspect of Dharma, as understood by Hindus. Yuga dharma is an aspect of dharma that is valid for a Yuga. The other aspect of dharma is Sanatan Dharma, dharma which is valid for eternity.

== See also ==
- Outline of Hinduism
- Index of Hinduism-related articles
