= Wheel of life (disambiguation) =

Wheel of life generally refers to the Bhavacakra, an instructional figure in Buddhism.

It might also mean:

- Saṃsāra understood as a cycle of life and death (as understood through various religions)
- Wheel of Life, a 2003 album by progressive rock group Karmakanic
- A sculpture with the name The Wheel of Life (Livshjulet) in Vigeland installation in Frogner Park, Oslo, Norway
- The Wheel of Life, a boulder problem in Hollow Mountain Cave in the Grampians of Australia
- Zoetrope, device that produces an illusion of action from a rapid succession of static pictures
- Wheel of Life, a coaching tool used in life coaching and management coaching to assess coaching priorities
- The Wheel of Life (1929 film), an American film by Paramount
- The Wheel of Life (1942 film), a Spanish film

== See also ==
- Samsara (disambiguation)
