= Torana Gate, Malaysia =

Gate in Kuala Lumpur, Malaysia

Torana Gate
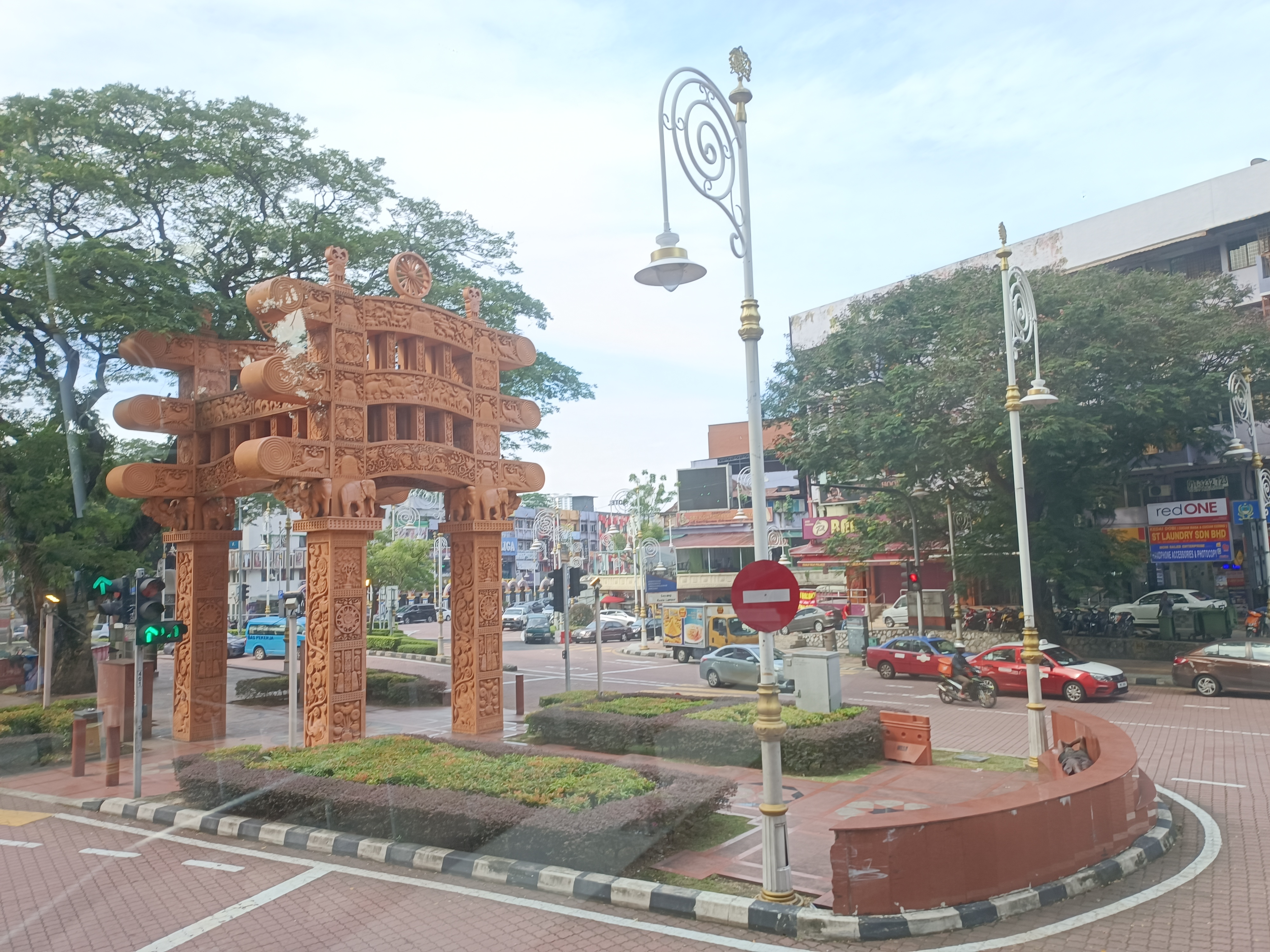
- The Torana Gate in 2022
- Location: Brickfields, Kuala Lumpur, Malaysia
- Designer: Akshaya Jain & Associates
- Type: Torana
- Width: 7.3 metres (24 ft)
- Height: 10.4 metres (34 ft)
- Completion date: 20 August 2015
- Opening date: 23 November 2015
- Dedicated to: Friendship between India and Malaysia

Torana Gate is a torana in Brickfields, Kuala Lumpur. The gate is a gift from the Government of India to Malaysia, as a mark of continued friendship between the two countries. It was influenced by Hindu and Buddhist architecture of the Indian subcontinent.

== History ==
Indian Prime Minister Manmohan Singh announced the construction of the Torana Gate during a state visit to Malaysia in 2010. The Indian Ministry of External Affairs invited 16 firms for its design competition, and appointed architects Akshaya Jain & Associates to design the gate. The design is identical to the Great Stupa at Sanchi, Madhya Pradesh.

The gate was reimagined, redesigned & made by Odyssey Stone, India and installed by developer MRCB Engineering Sdn Bhd on 20 August 2015. The Torana Gate was inaugurated on 23 November 2015 jointly by Indian & Malaysian Prime Ministers.

== Design ==
The reliefs on the Torana Gate, though broadly derived from the carvings at the Torana Gates of Sanchi, are yet different and intended to portray Indian art in a contemporary manner, adapted to suit the locational context by Founder Ruchika Grover of Odyssey Stone, India. A large number of decorative elements have been used on the columns and architraves including carved panels as well as sculpted blocks. The paved area around the Torana Gate, up to the piazza around the existing fountain, consists of patterned granite flooring. The pedestrian spine along the central axis is designed with a variety of geometrical motifs in varied shades of granite. The curvilinear ceiling of the Torana structure was designed with ribs running in both directions. These structural ribs, creating 24 coffers, support carved stone panels, which are square and have intricate floral carvings.

== Gallery ==
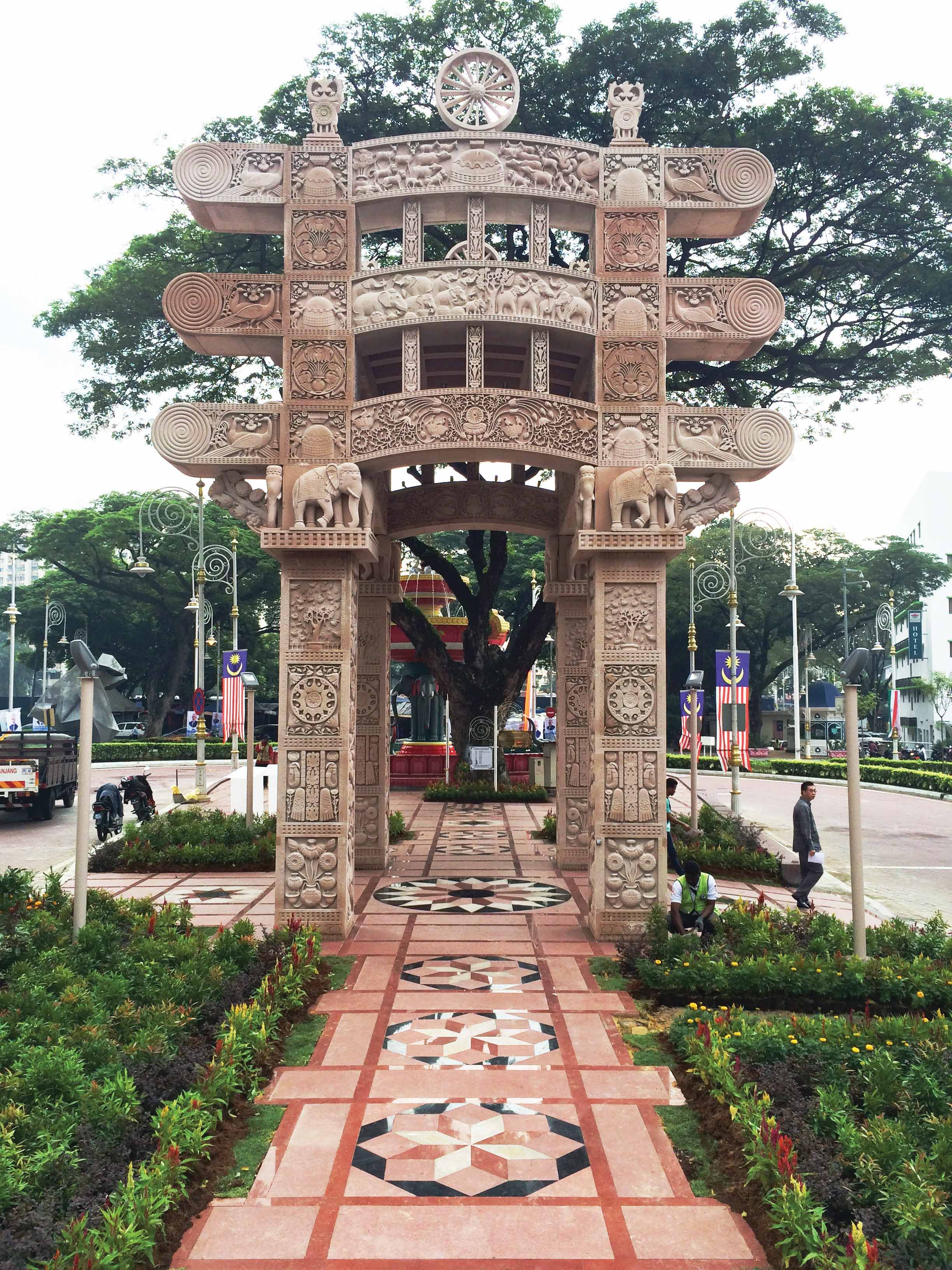
Torana Gate in Kuala Lumpur, Malaysia

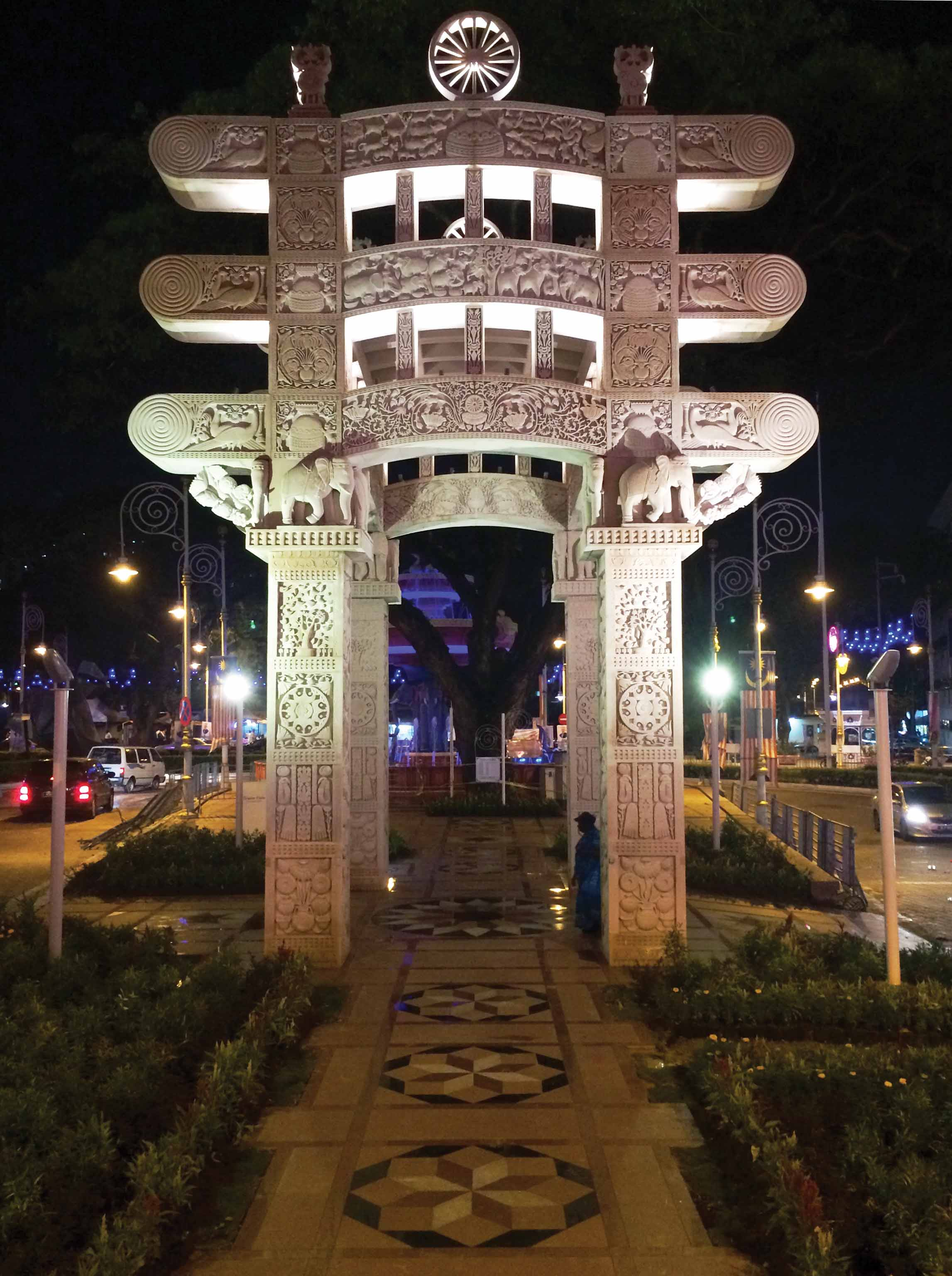
Night view of Torana Gate

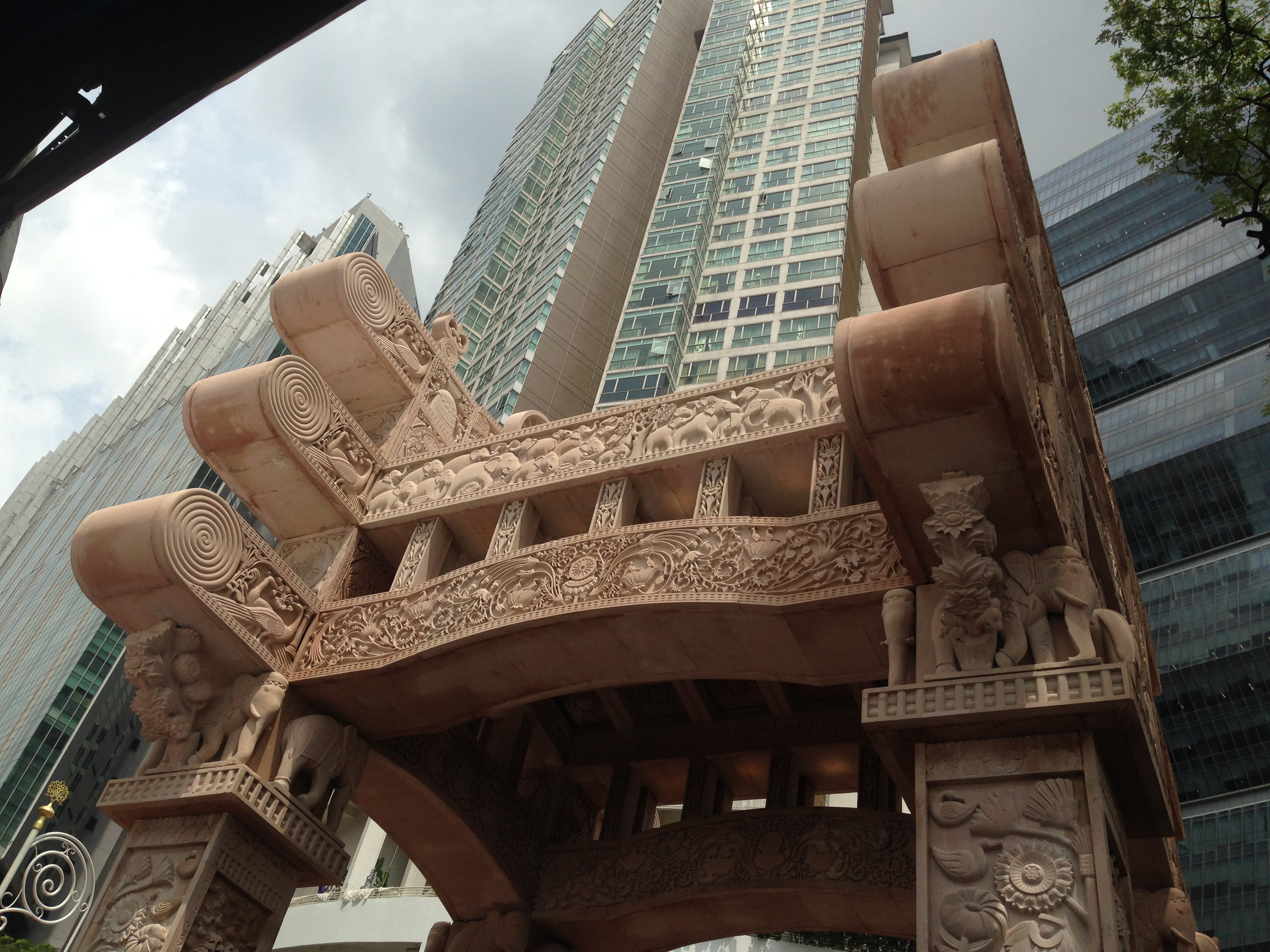
Detailed carvings on the Torana Gate

== See also ==
- India–Malaysia relations
- Torana
