= Samskara =

Samskara, saṃskāra, saṅskāra or sanskara may refer to:

- Samskara (rite of passage), Hindu and Jain rites of passage
- Samskara (Ayurveda), a technique in Ayurvedic medicine
- Samskara (Indian philosophy), the concept of imprints or impressions left on the mind by experience in Indian philosophies
- Saṅkhāra, the Buddhist concept of "formations"
- Samskara (film), an Indian film based on the novel by U. R. Ananthamurthy

== See also ==
- Samsara (disambiguation)
- Sanskrit, an ancient Indian language
