= Sansar =

Sansar may refer to:

- Samsara, a concept in Indian religions
- Sansar (1951 film), directed by S. S. Vasan
- Sansar (1971 film), directed by Dilip Bose
- Sansar (1975 film), a Turkish film of 1975
- Sansar (1987 film), directed by T. Rama Rao
- Sansar Chand (c. 1765–1823), ruler of the state of Kangra
- Sansar (video game), a social virtual reality platform

== See also ==
- Samsara (disambiguation), alternate transliteration
