= Samsara (disambiguation) =

Saṃsāra is a religious concept of reincarnation in Indian religions.

For saṃsāra in specific religions, see:

- Saṃsāra (Hinduism), the concept in Hinduism
- Saṃsāra (Buddhism), similar but distinct concept in Buddhism
- Saṃsāra (Jainism), cycle of births and deaths as per Jainism

== Film and television ==
- Samsaram (1950 film), a 1950 film directed by L. V. Prasad
- Samsaram (1951 film), the Tamil remake of Samsaram (1950)
- Samsaram (1975 film), a 1975 film produced and directed by T. Prakash Rao
- Samsaram (1988 film), a 1988 film directed by Relangi Narasimha Rao
- Samsara (1988 film), a 1988 film directed by Huang Jianxin
- Samsara: Death and Rebirth in Cambodia, a 1989 short documentary film directed by Ellen Bruno
- Samsara (2001 film), a 2001 film about a Buddhist monk's quest, directed by Pan Nalin
- Samsara (2011 film), a 2011 non-narrative documentary film directed by Ron Fricke
- Samsara (2024 film), a 2024 silent film directed by Garin Nugroho
- "Samsara" (Red Dwarf), a 2016 TV series episode

== Music ==
- Samsara (Yakuza album), 2006
- Samsara (The Breathing Process album), 2018
- "Samsara", a song by Rupert Hine from the 1981 album Immunity
- "Samsara", a song by Parkway Drive from the 2010 album Deep Blue
- "Samsara", a song by Chimaira from the 2011 album The Age of Hell
- "Samsara", a song by High on Fire from the 2012 album De Vermis Mysteriis
- "Samsara", a song by Monuments from the 2014 album The Amanuensis
- "Samsara", a song by Reflections from the 2020 album Willow
- "Samsara", a song by Fairyland from the 2025 album The Story Remains
- "Samsara 2015", a 2014 song by Martin Tungevaag

== Other uses ==
- Samsara Foundation, Thailand
- Samsara (company), American technology company
- Samsara (perfume), created in 1989 by Jean-Paul Guerlain
- Samsara (yacht), luxury yacht owned by J.K. Rowling

== See also ==
- Sansar (disambiguation), alternate transliteration
- Samskara (disambiguation)
