= Torana (architecture) =

Free-standing ornamental or arched gateway

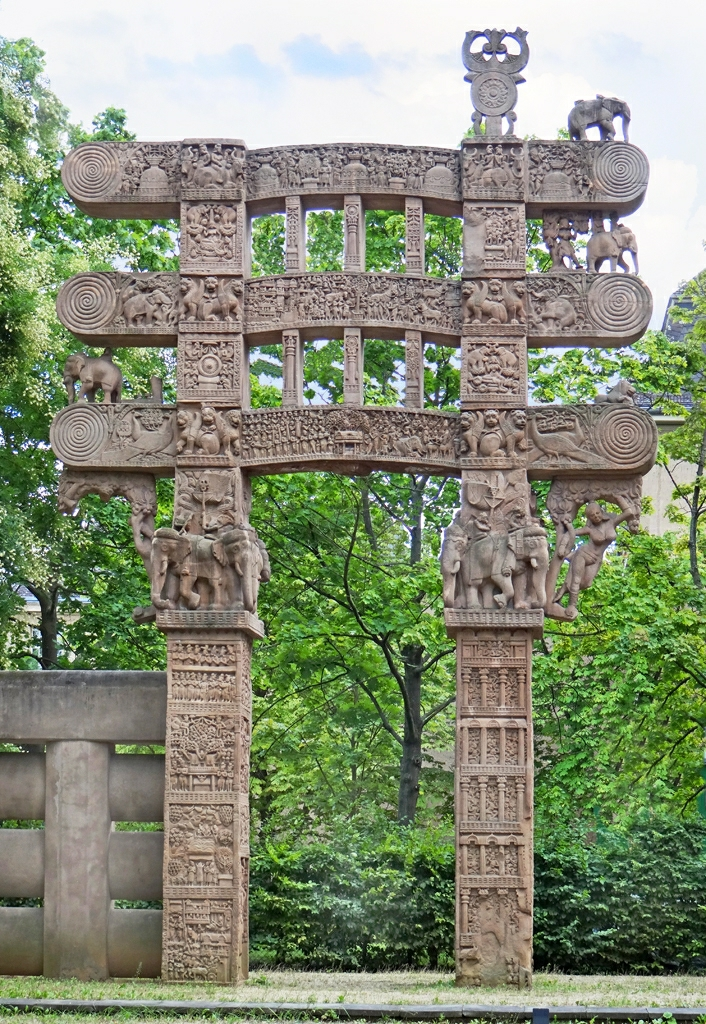
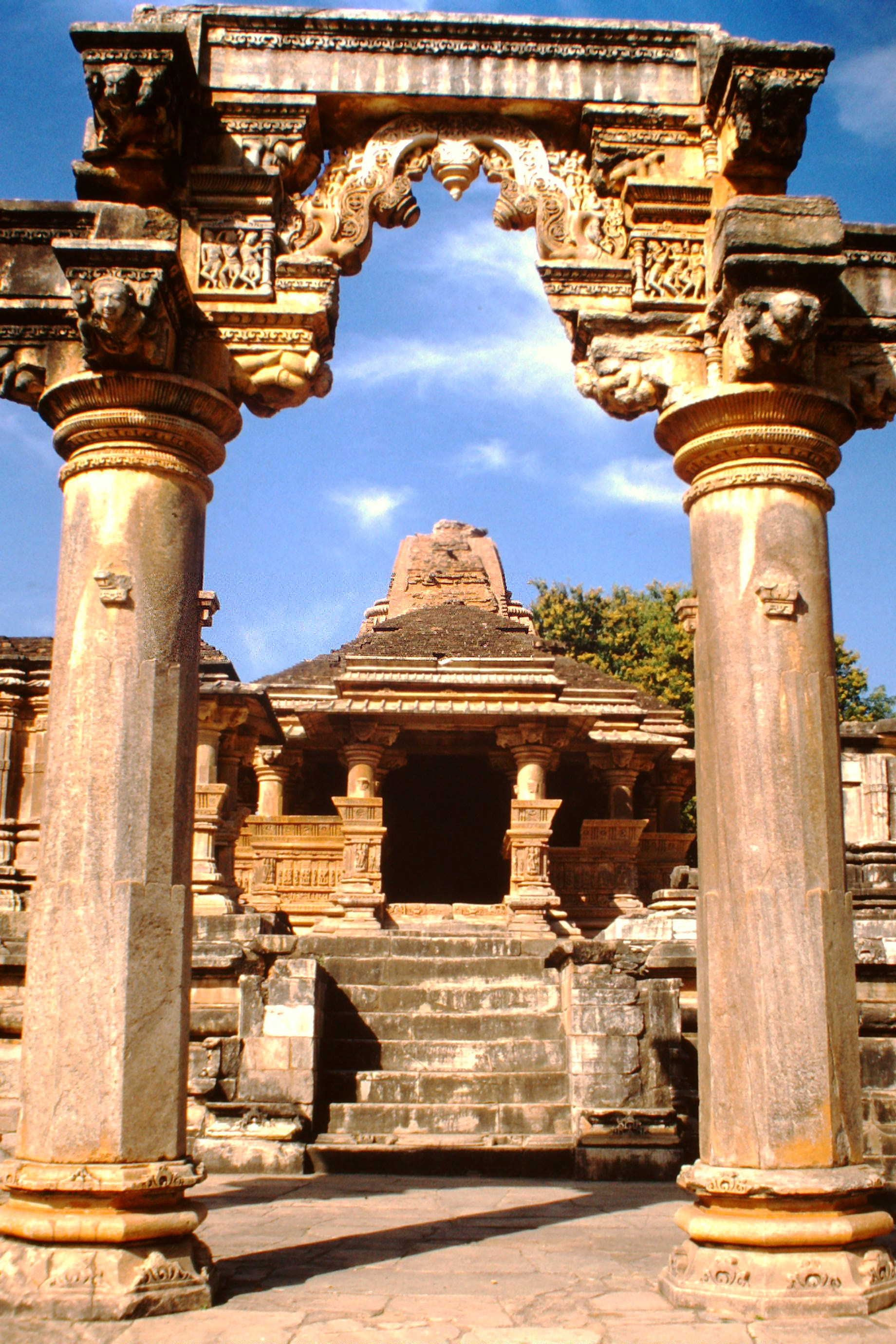
Multiple kinds of Torana

A torana (Sanskrit: तोरण, romanized: Toraṇa) is a free-standing ornamental or arched gateway for ceremonial purposes in Hindu, Buddhist and Jain architecture of the Indian subcontinent. Toranas can also be widely seen in East Asia and parts of Southeast Asia. Chinese Paifang gateways, Korean Hongsalmun gateways, Japanese torii gateways,, Vietnamese Tam quan gateways, and Thai Sao Ching Cha may have derived from the Indian torana. They are also referred to as vandanamalikas.

== History ==
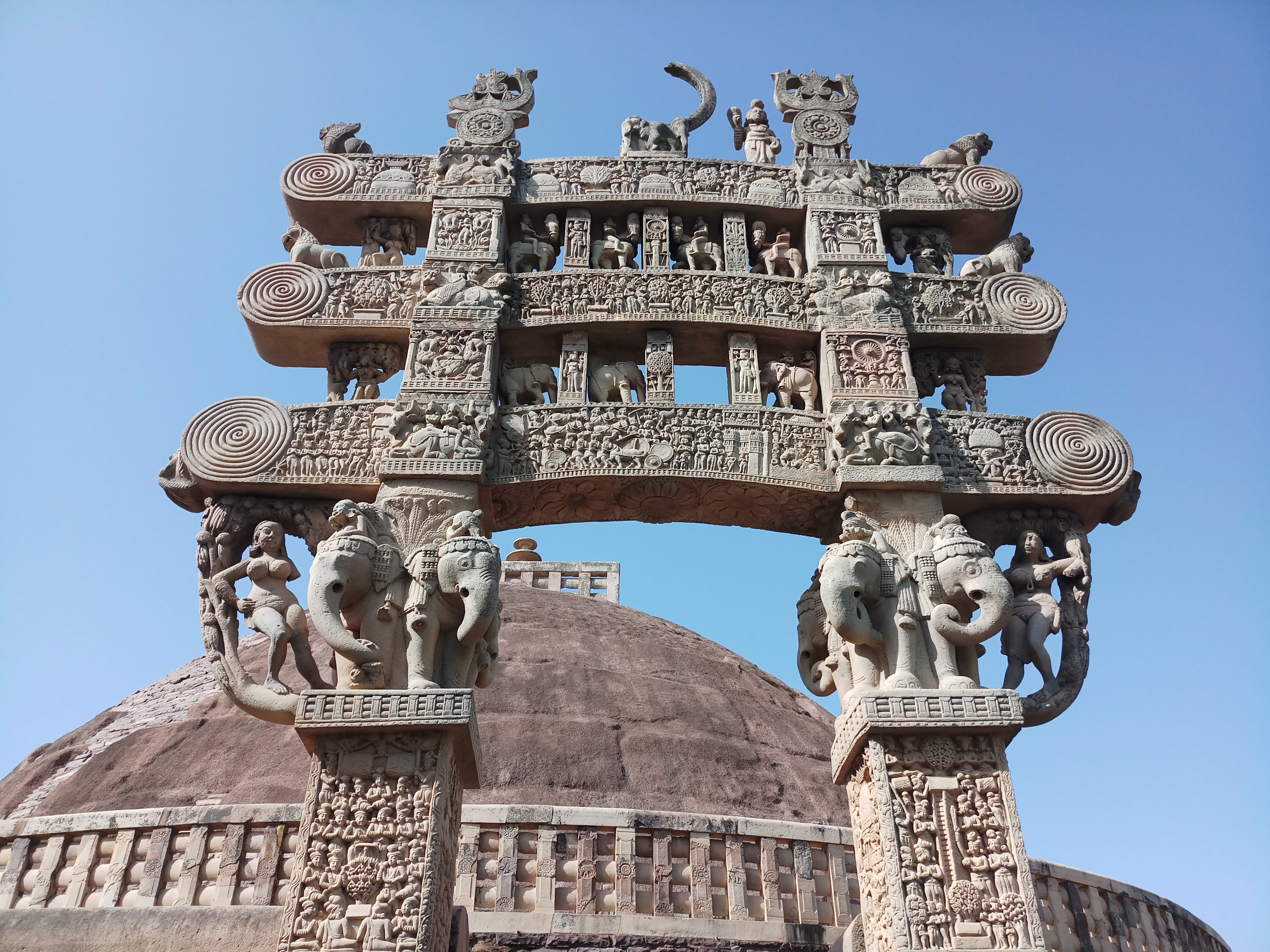
Torana of Sanchi Stupa. The stupa dates to the period of the Mauryan Empire (3rd century BC), but the torana itself dates to the Satavahana period, in the 1st century BCE. The site is now a UNESCO World Heritage Site.

Indologist art historian and archaeologist Percy Brown has traced the origin of torana from the grama-dvara (village-gateways) of the vedic era (1500 BCE – 500 BCE) village which later developed as a popular adornment for cities, places, and sacred shrines. According to the vedic text, the Arthasastra, gateways of different forms were to adorn the entrance to a city or a palace.

A granite stone fragment of an arch discovered by K. P. Jayaswal from Kumhrar, Pataliputra has been analysed as a pre Mauryan Nanda period keystone fragment of a trefoil arch of gateway with mason's marks of three archaic Brahmi letters inscribed on it which probably decorated a torana. The wedge shaped stone with indentation has mauryan polish on two sides and was suspended vertically.

In the Mauryan Empire, the archaeological evidence shows the toranas of Sanchi Stupa dates back to the 3rd century BCE. The form of the Sanchi torana appears to reflect earlier examples in wood, which was popular in Indian architecture before the 3rd century BCE.

In Kalinga architecture we can see the torana in many temples built from the 7th to 12th centuries. Jagannath Temple, Puri, Rajarani Temple and Mukteswar Temple are the few example of Kalinga architecture having torana.

In Gujarat, several toranas were built under the Chaulukya dynasty (10th-12th century), mostly associated with temples, such as Kirti Toran in Vadnagar.

== Types of torana ==
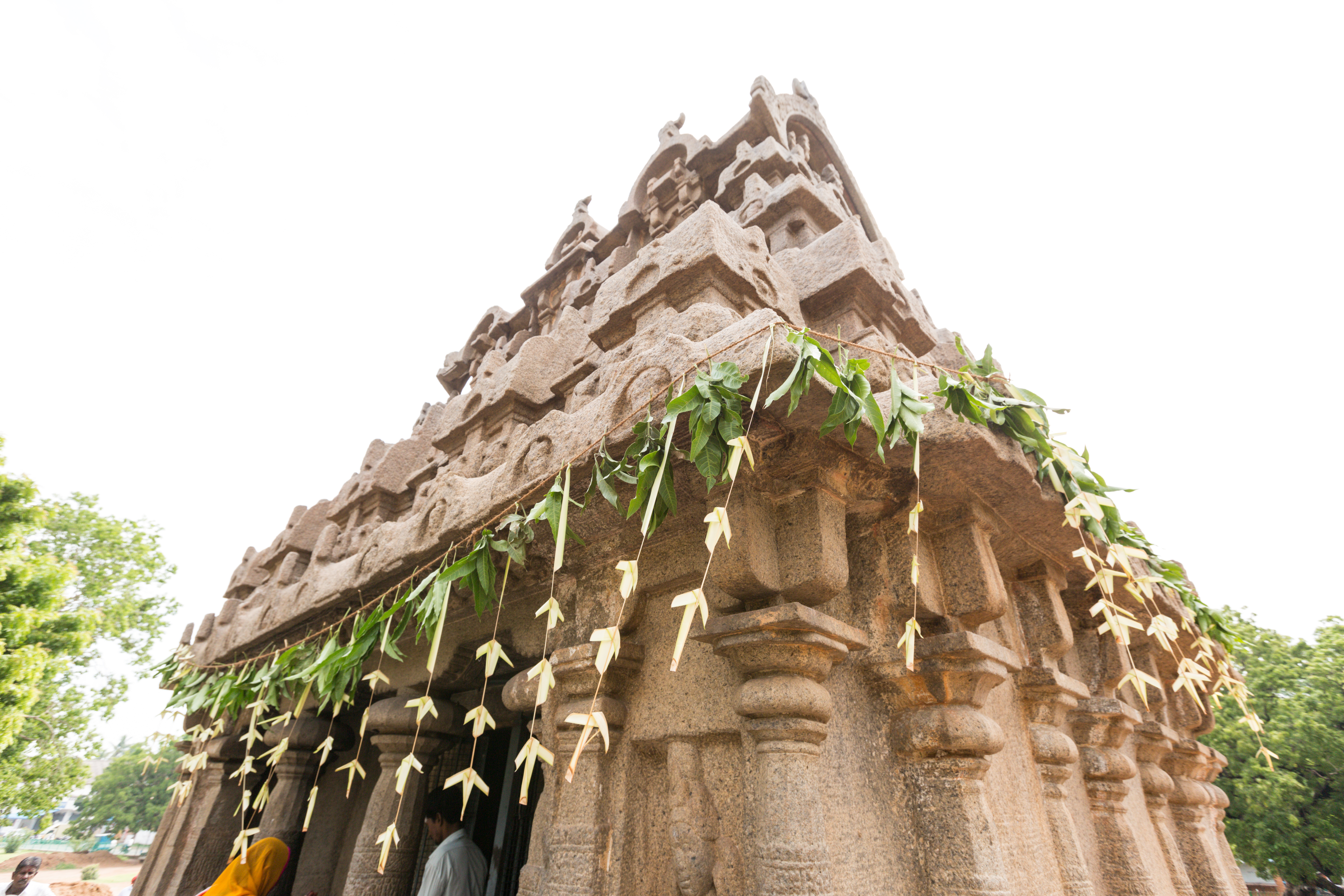
Traditional torana hanging made from mango leaves and palm leaves. They are typically tied over doors, altars at home, during festives and on temples.

There are many different types of toranas, such as, patra-torana (on the scrolls or gateway adornment made of leaves), puspa-torana (made of flowers), ratna-torana (made of precious stones), stambha-torana (made on pillars), citra-torana (made of paintings), bhitti-torana (adornment made on walls, such as over the wall recess or false portals and windows, could even be a specific type of wall painting) and dvara-toranas (appended adornment over a gateway (e.g. toran) or an adorned gateways itself). These are mentioned in the medieval Indian architectural treatises.

== Socio-religious significance of torana ==
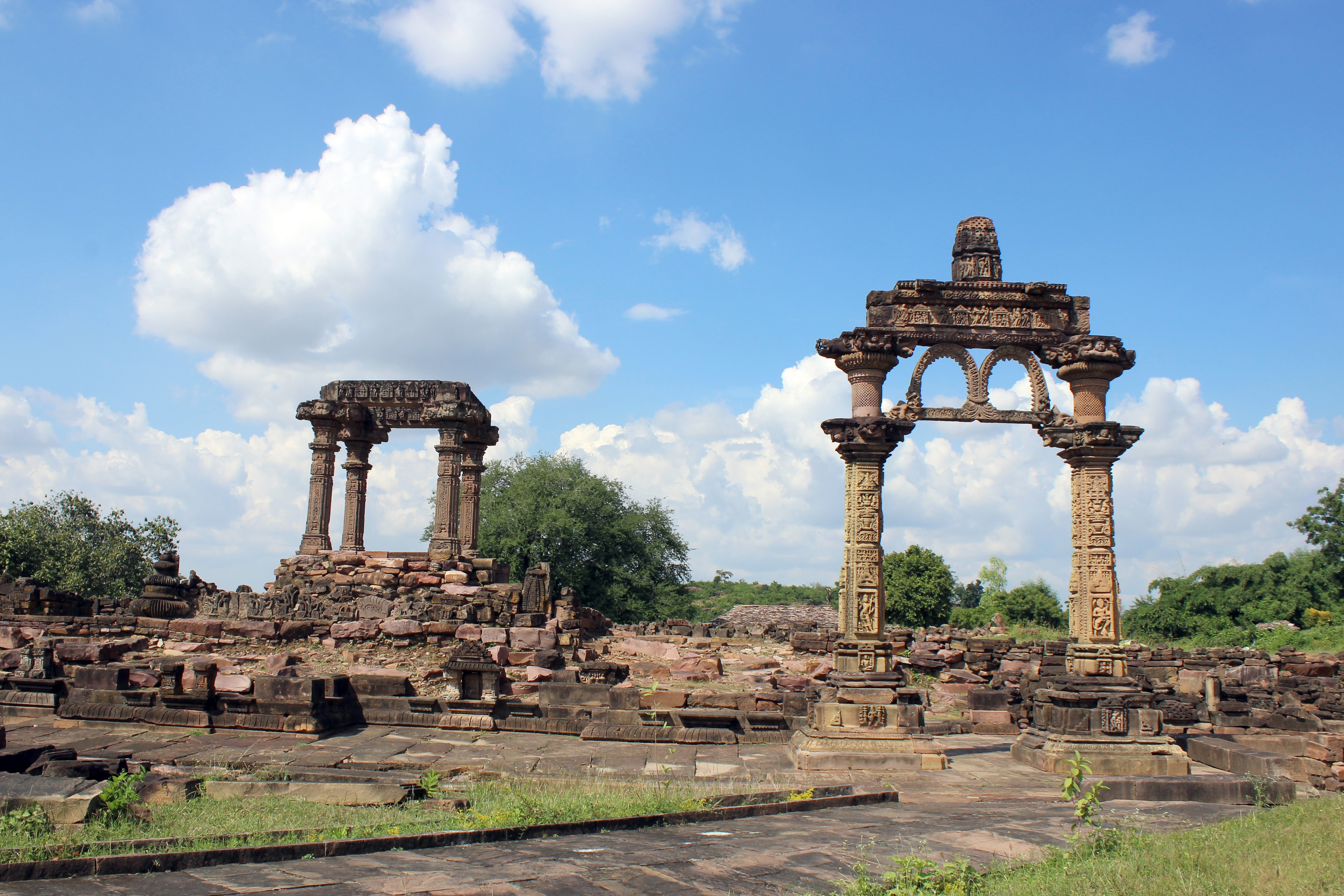
Hindola Torana. 9th century torana in Madhya Pradesh, India.

Torana is a sacred or honorific gateway in Buddhist and Hindu architecture. Its typical form is a projecting cross-piece resting on two uprights or posts. It is made of wood or stone, and the cross-piece is generally of three bars placed one on the top of the other; both cross-piece and posts are usually sculpted.

Toranas are associated with Buddhist stupas like the Great Stupa in Sanchi, as well as with Jain and Hindu structures, and also with several secular structures. Symbolic toranas can also be made of flowers and even leaves and hung over the doors and at entrances, particularly in Western and Southern India. They are believed to bring good fortune and signify auspicious and festive occasions. They can also serve didactic and narrative purposes or be erected to mark the victory of a king.

During the Vesak festival of Sri Lanka it is a tradition to erect electrically illuminated colorful Vesak toranas in public places. These decorations are temporary installations which remain in public display for couple of weeks starting from the day of Vesak.

== Thorana (Vesak) ==
During the Vesak festival of Sri Lanka it is a tradition to erect electrically illuminated colorful Vesak Pandols (Thorana) in public places (usually organized by communities, trade organisations). These decorations are temporary installations which remain in public display for couple of weeks starting from the day of Vesak. Moreover, these large structures attracts so many locals in Sri Lanka, and also foreign people from around the world.

== Usage outside India ==
=== East and Southeast Asia ===
Many places that were part of the Greater India and Indosphere were Indianised, as great deal of cultural exchange with India took place in ancient times, examples of cultural and religious practices influenced by the Indian practices include Thai, Chinese, Korean, Japanese and other South Asian, East Asian and Southeast Asian cultures. For example, Benzaiten is a Japanese name for the Hindu goddess Saraswati, and the ancient Siddhaṃ script, which disappeared from India by 1200 CE, is still written by monks in Japan.

Ancient Indian torna sacred gateway architecture has influenced gateway architecture across Asia specially where Buddhism was transmitted from India; Chinese paifang gateways Japanese torii gateways, Korean hongsalmun gateway, and Sao Ching Cha in Thailand have been derived from the Indian torana. The functions of all are similar, but they generally differ based on their respective architectural styles.

Torana Gate, Malaysia, a torana gateway) in Brickfields in Kuala Lumpur, is a gift from the Government of India to Malaysia, construction of which in design identical to the Sanchi Stupa was completed in 2015.

==== Torii in Japan ====
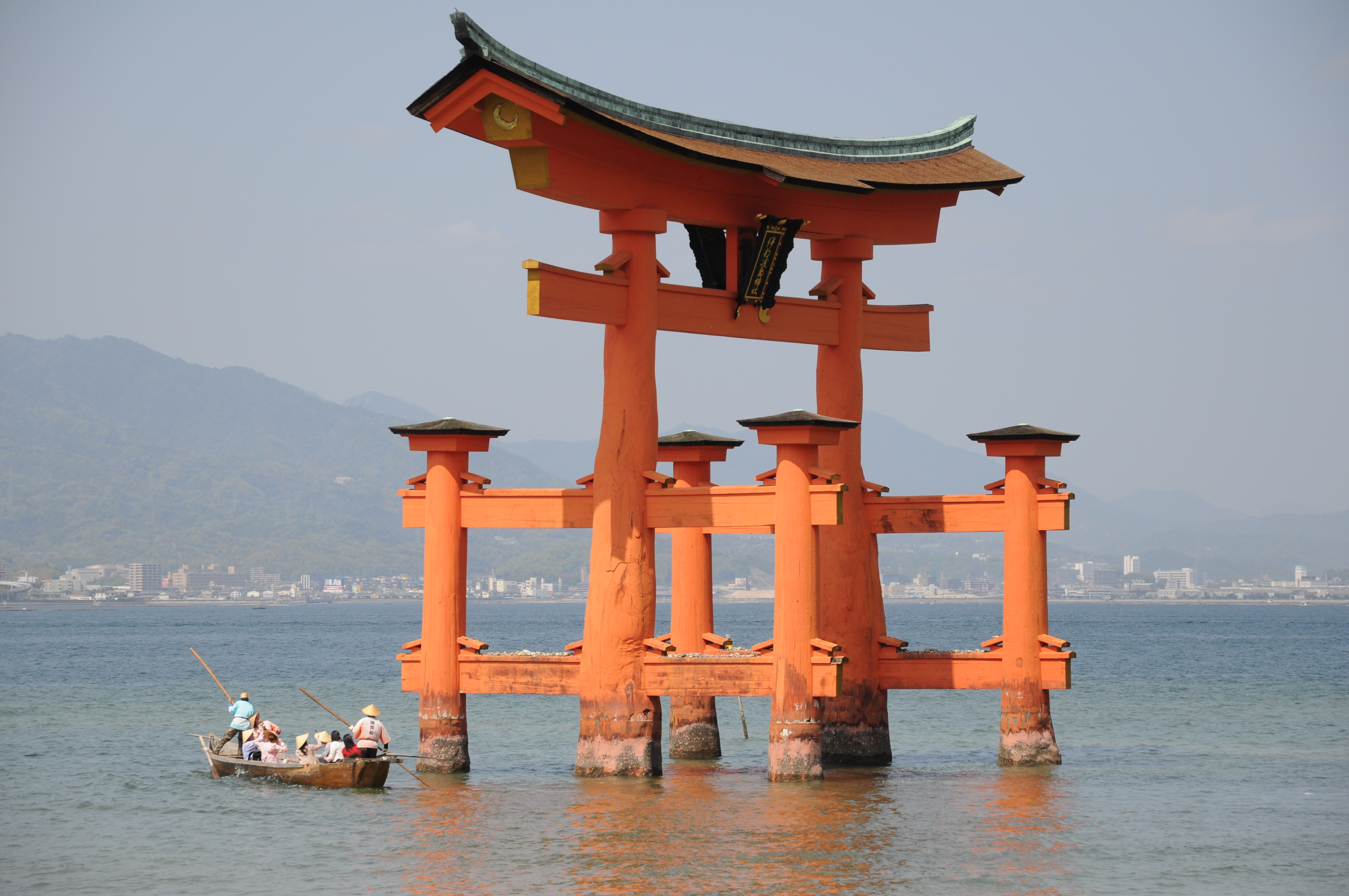
The famous torii at Itsukushima Shrine, a UNESCO World Heritage Site in Japan, where the Indian Hindu goddess Saraswati is worshipped as the Buddhist-Shinto goddess Benzaiten.

The torii, a gateway erected on the approach to every Shinto shrine, was derived from the Indian torana. According to several scholars, the vast evidence shows how the torii, both etymologically and architecturally, were originally derived from the torana, a free-standing sacred ceremonial gateway which marks the entrance of a sacred enclosure, such as Hindu-Buddhist temple or shrine, or city.

==== Hongsalmun gateways and Iljumun gates in Korea ====
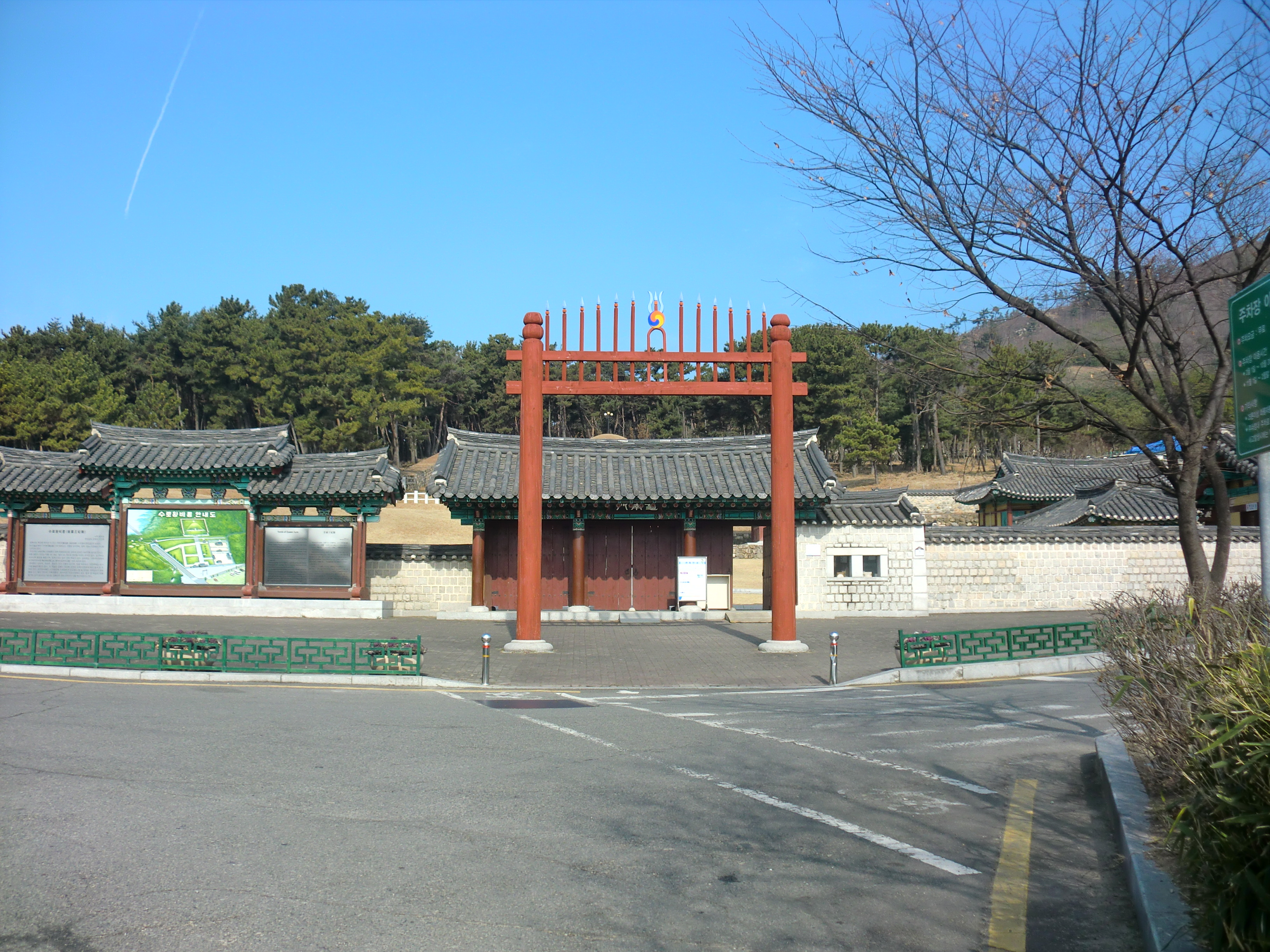
Hongsalmun, in red, at the tomb of legendary Korean Emperor Suro of Geumgwan Gaya and his legendary wife Queen Heo Hwang-ok believed to be an Indian princess and mother of all Koreans of Heo and Kim clans.

The hongsalmun is a gate for entering a sacred place in Korea. It is arranged by two round poles set vertically and two transverse bars. It has no roof and door-gate, and placed on the middle top gate is a symbol of the trisula and the taegeuk image. Hongsalmun are usually erected to indicate Korean Confucian sites, such as shrines, tombs, and academies such as hyanggyo and seowon.

==== Paifang in China ====
The paifang, also known as a pailou, is a traditional style of Chinese architectural arch or gateway structure. Originally derived from Indian torana through the introduction of Buddhism to China, it has evolved into many styles and has been introduced to other East Asian countries such as Korea, Japan, and Vietnam.

== Gallery ==
=== Toranas in India ===
Hindu, Buddhist and Jain toranas
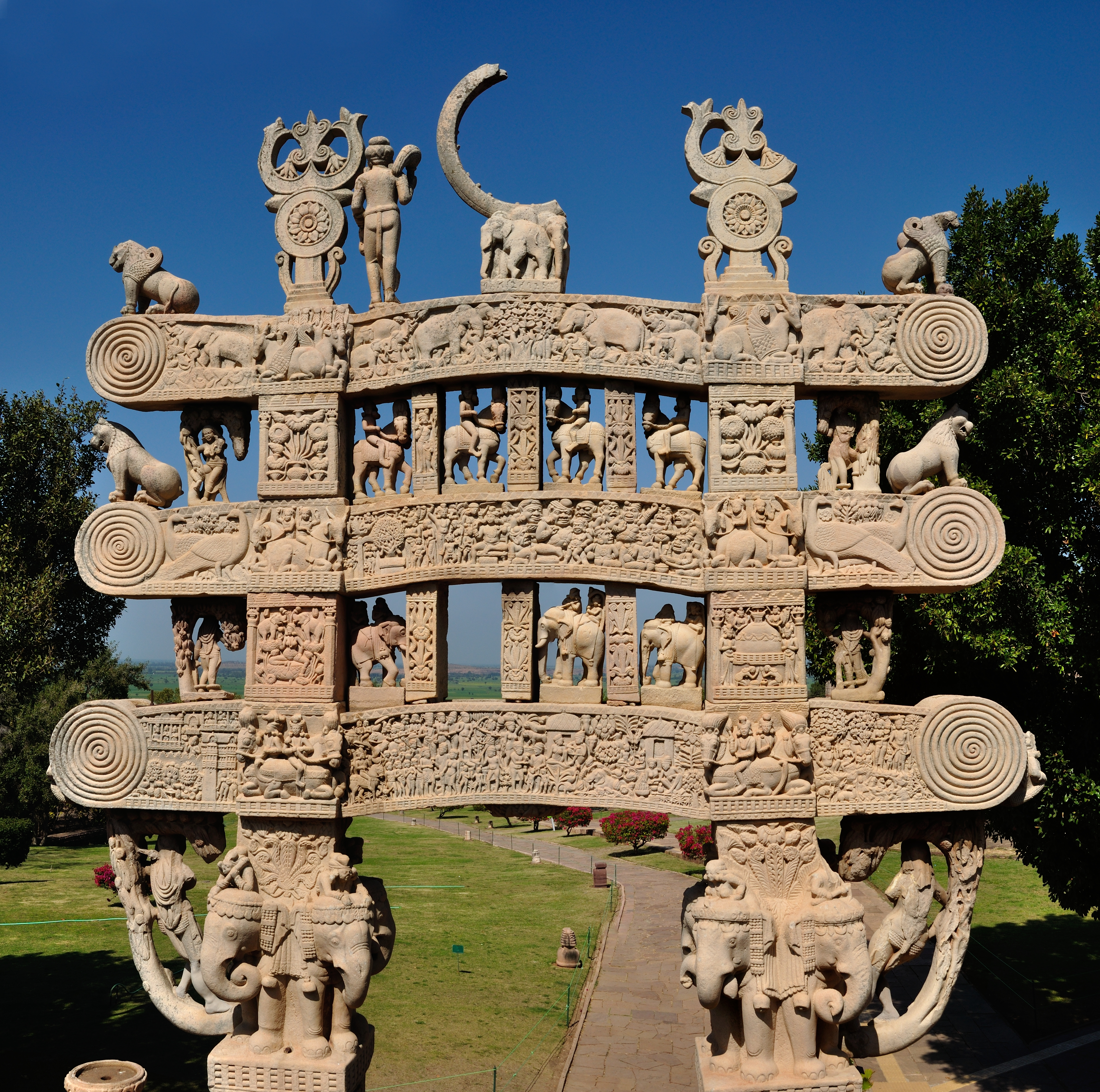
Rear side of North Torana of Stupa-1 at Sanchi Hill, 3rd century BCE to 1st century BCE, India.

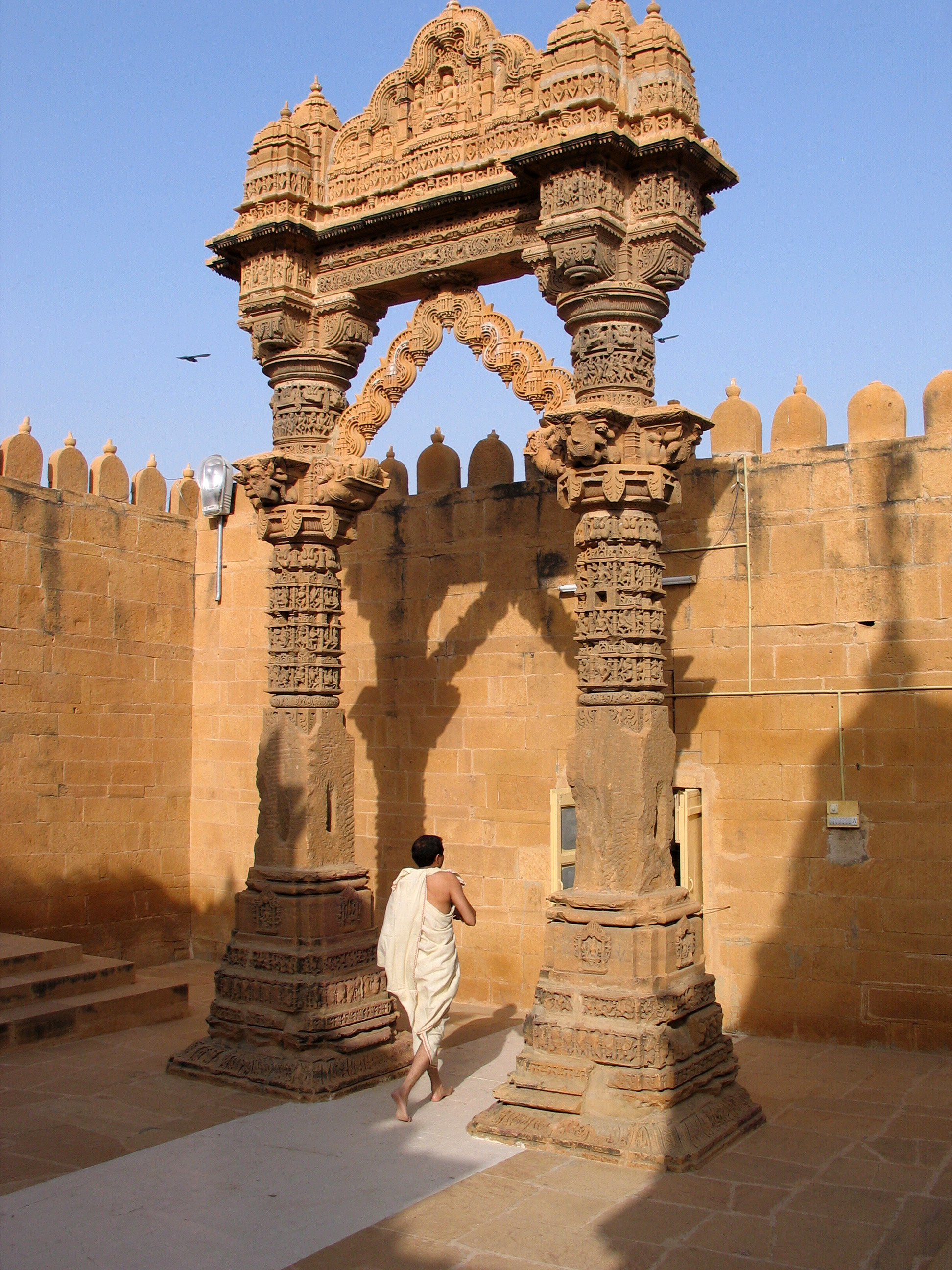
Jain Torana at Lodhurva Jain temple, rebuilt in 1615 CE after repeated destruction by Islamic invaders Mahmud of Ghazni (1025 CE) and Muhammad Ghori (1178 CE), near Jaisalmer, India.

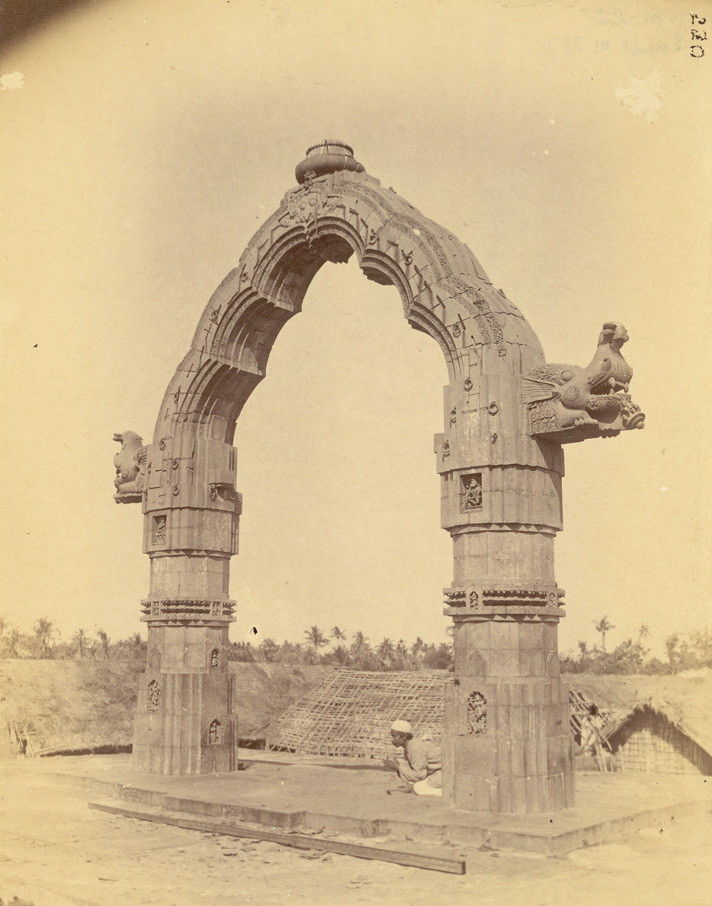
A photo of Torana taken in 1890 of 10th century Jagannath Temple, Puri, India.

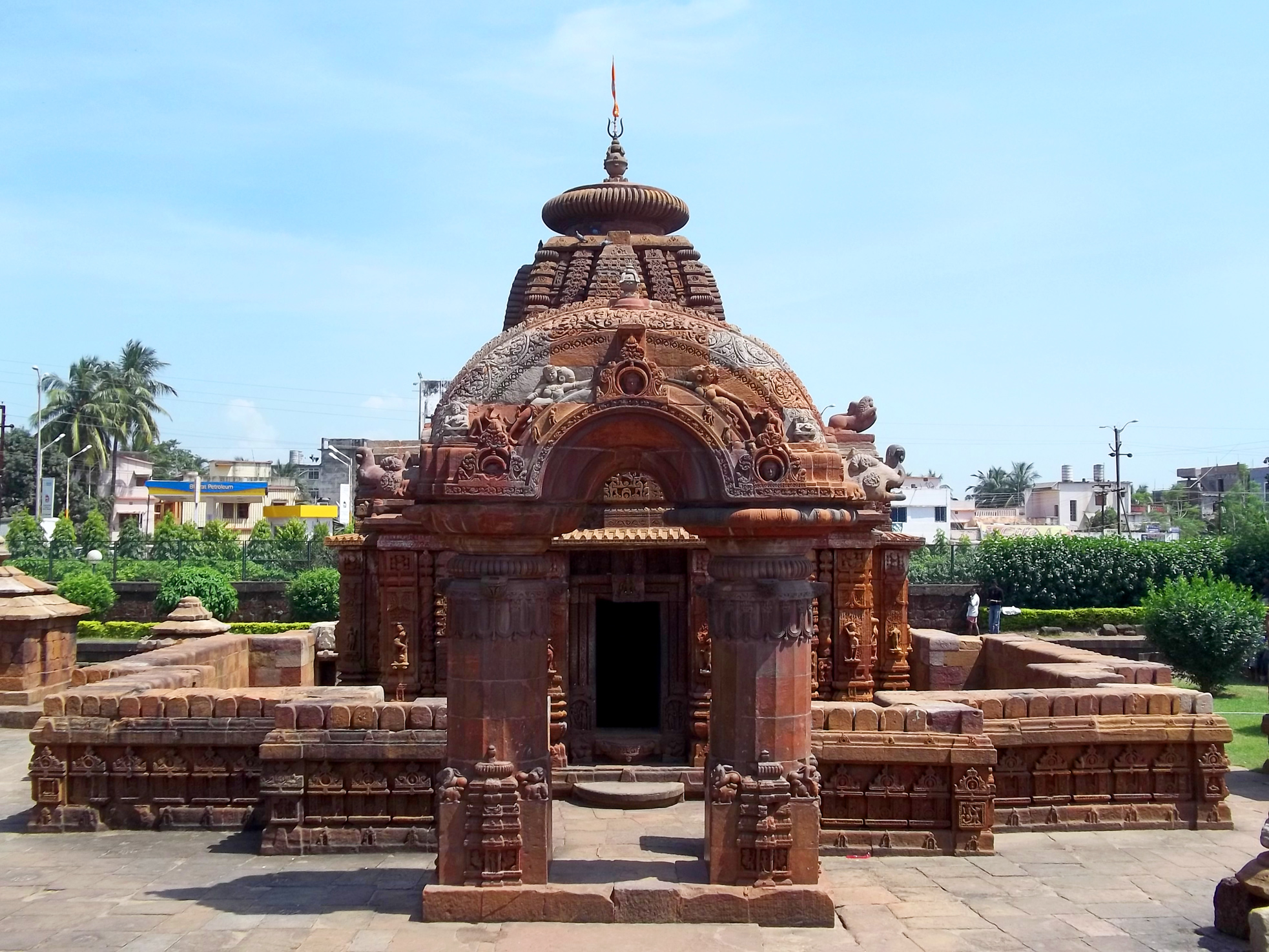
Torana of the 10th century Muktesvara deula, India.

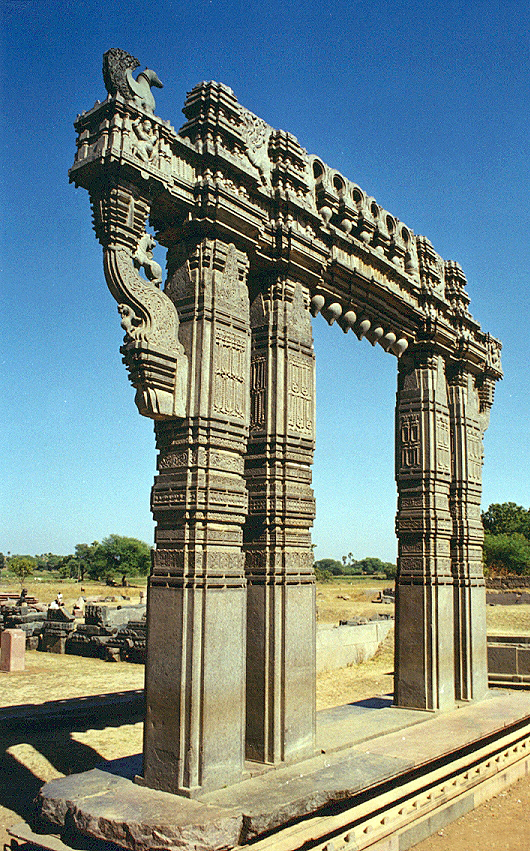
Hindu Torana from the 12th century Kakatiya dynasty, at Warangal Fort, India.

=== Toranas overseas ===
Hindu, Buddhist and Jain toranas outside India
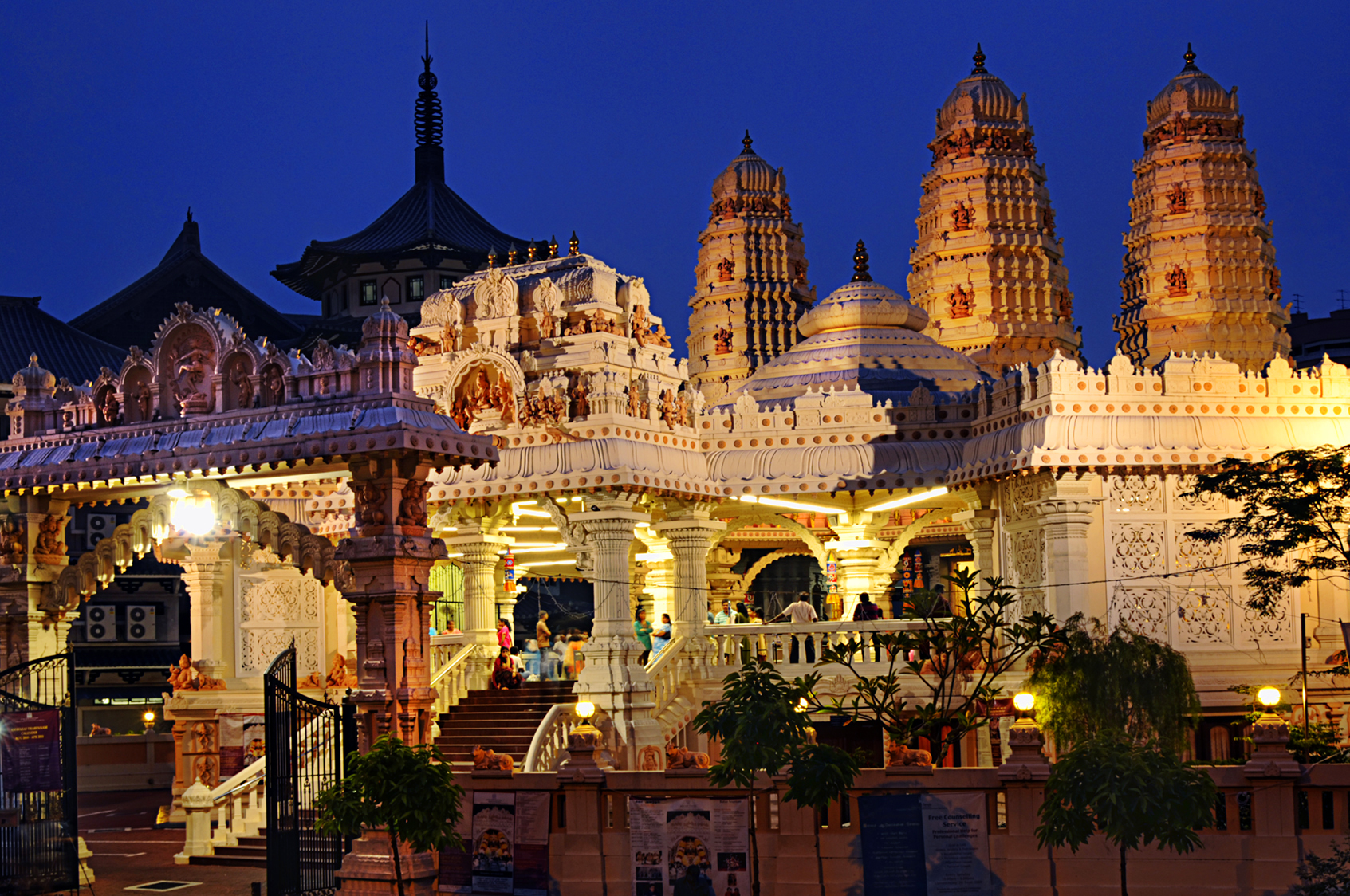
Torana of Sri Sivan Temple on the left, built in 1993, 5 minutes walk from Exit-C of Paya Lebar MRT station, Singapore.

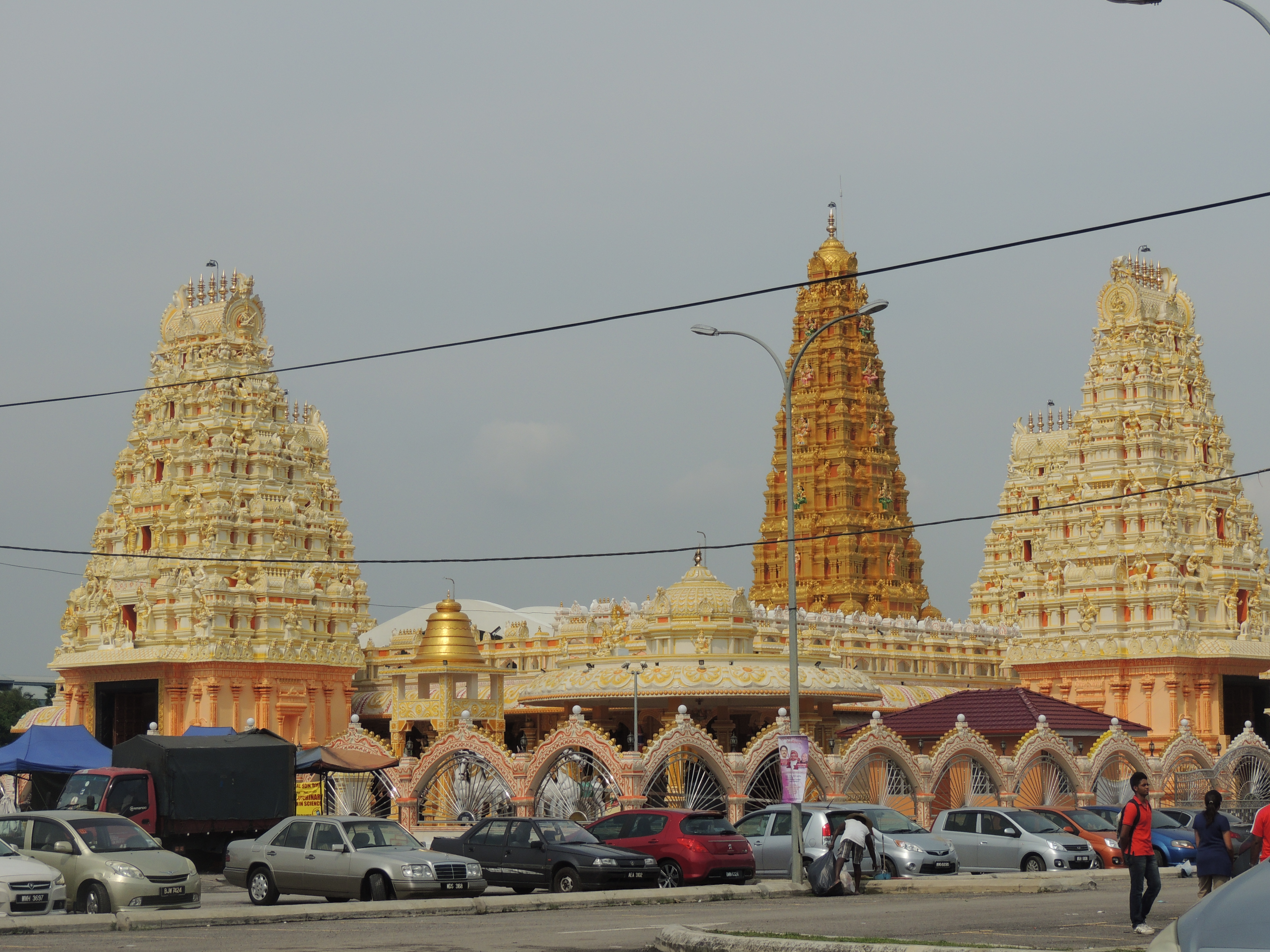
Torana at front of South Indian-style Hindu Sri Sunderaraja Perumal Temple, built in 1892, at Klang in Selangor, Malaysia.

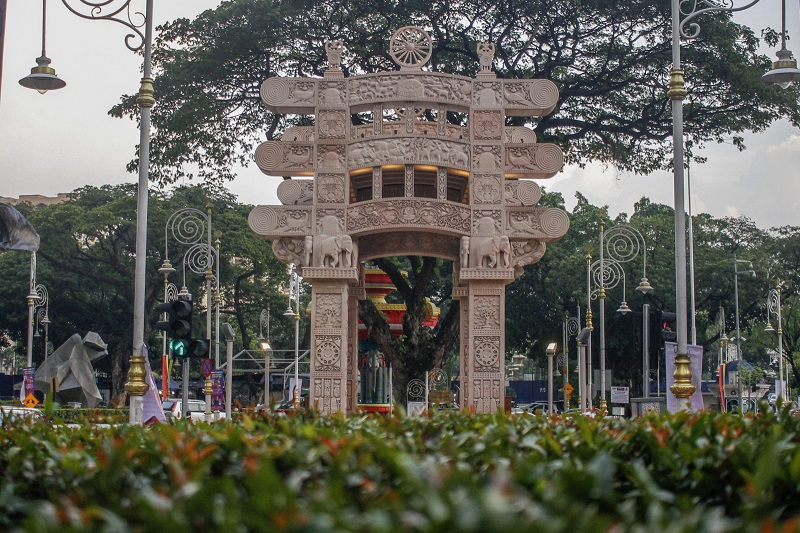
Torana Gate, built in 2015, at Brickfields in Kuala Lumpur, Malaysia.

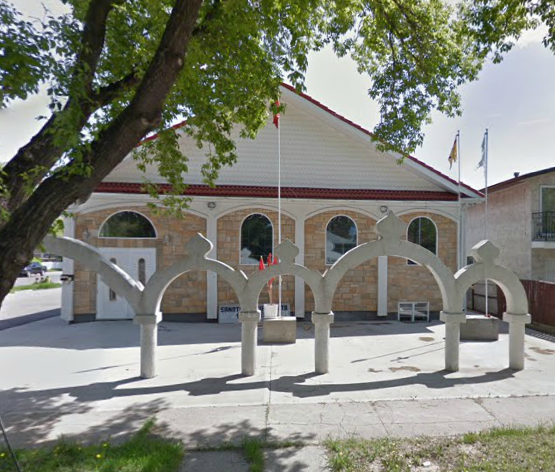
Torana at front of Fiji Sanatan Society of Alberta, built in 1984, at Edmonton in Alberta province, Canada.

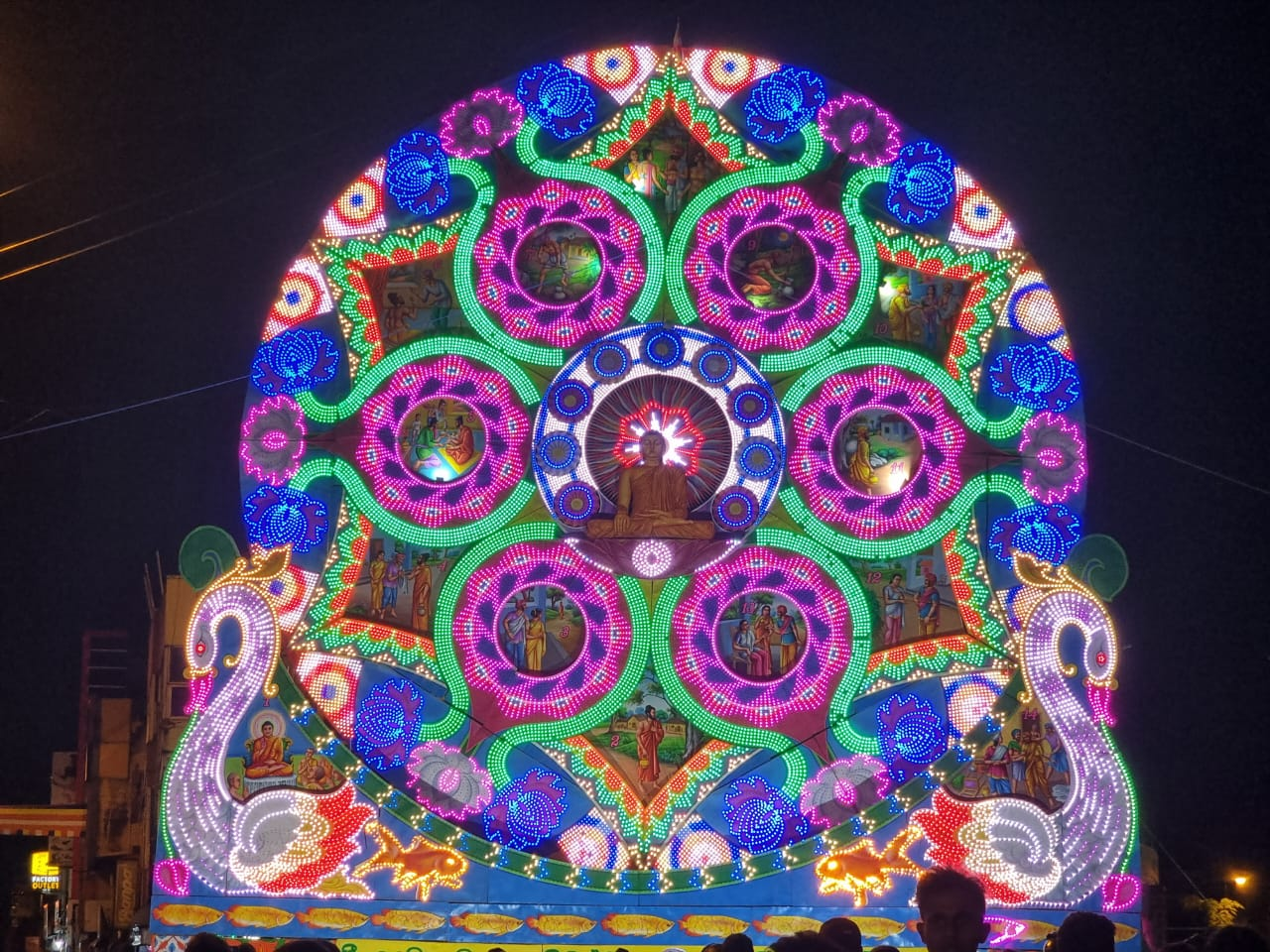
Grandpass Vesak Thorana (Pandol) 2022

=== Derived styles ===
Related styles
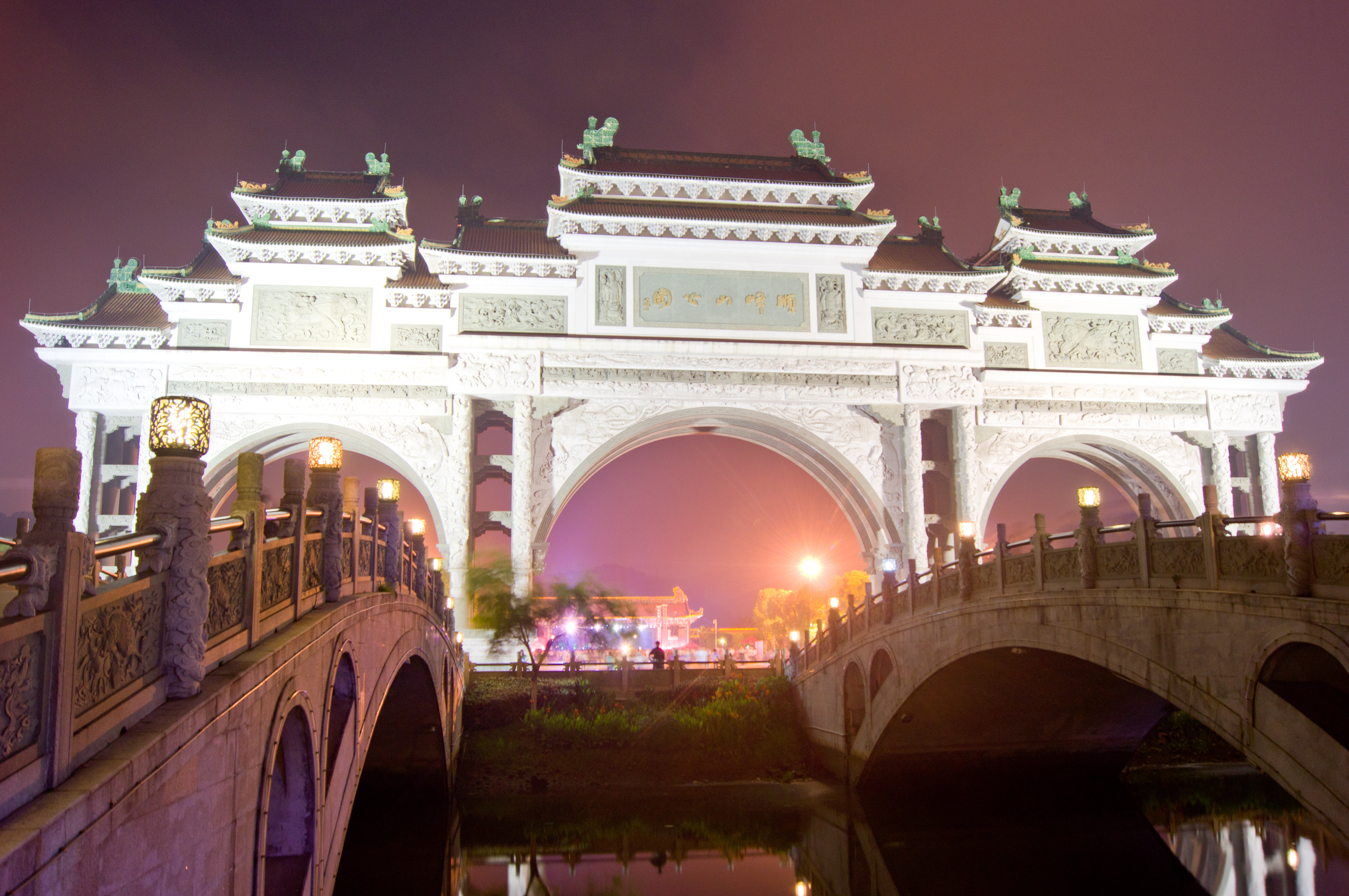
A Chinese paifang

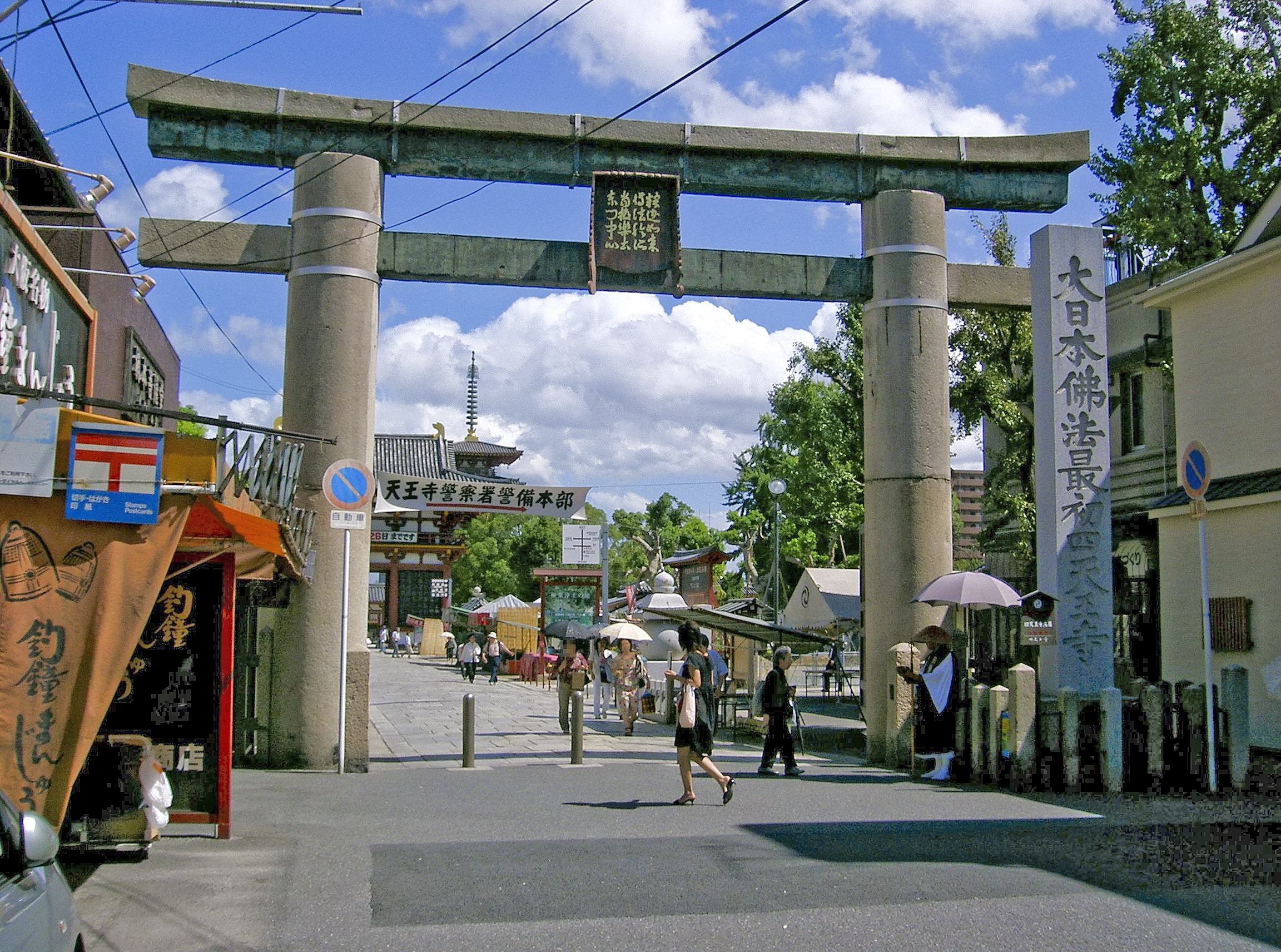
A Japanese torii at the entrance of Shitennō-ji, a Buddhist temple in Osaka

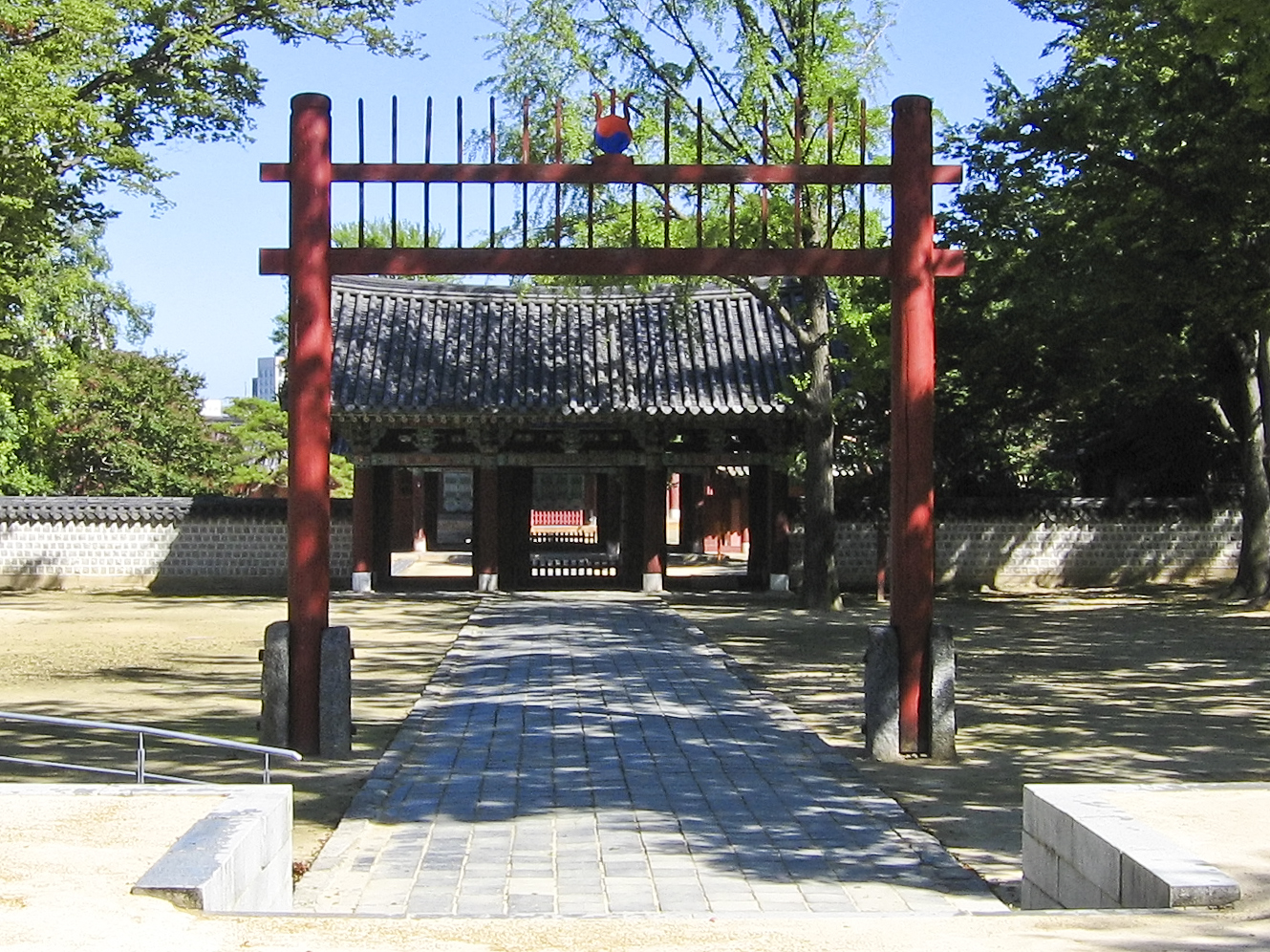
A Korean hongsalmun

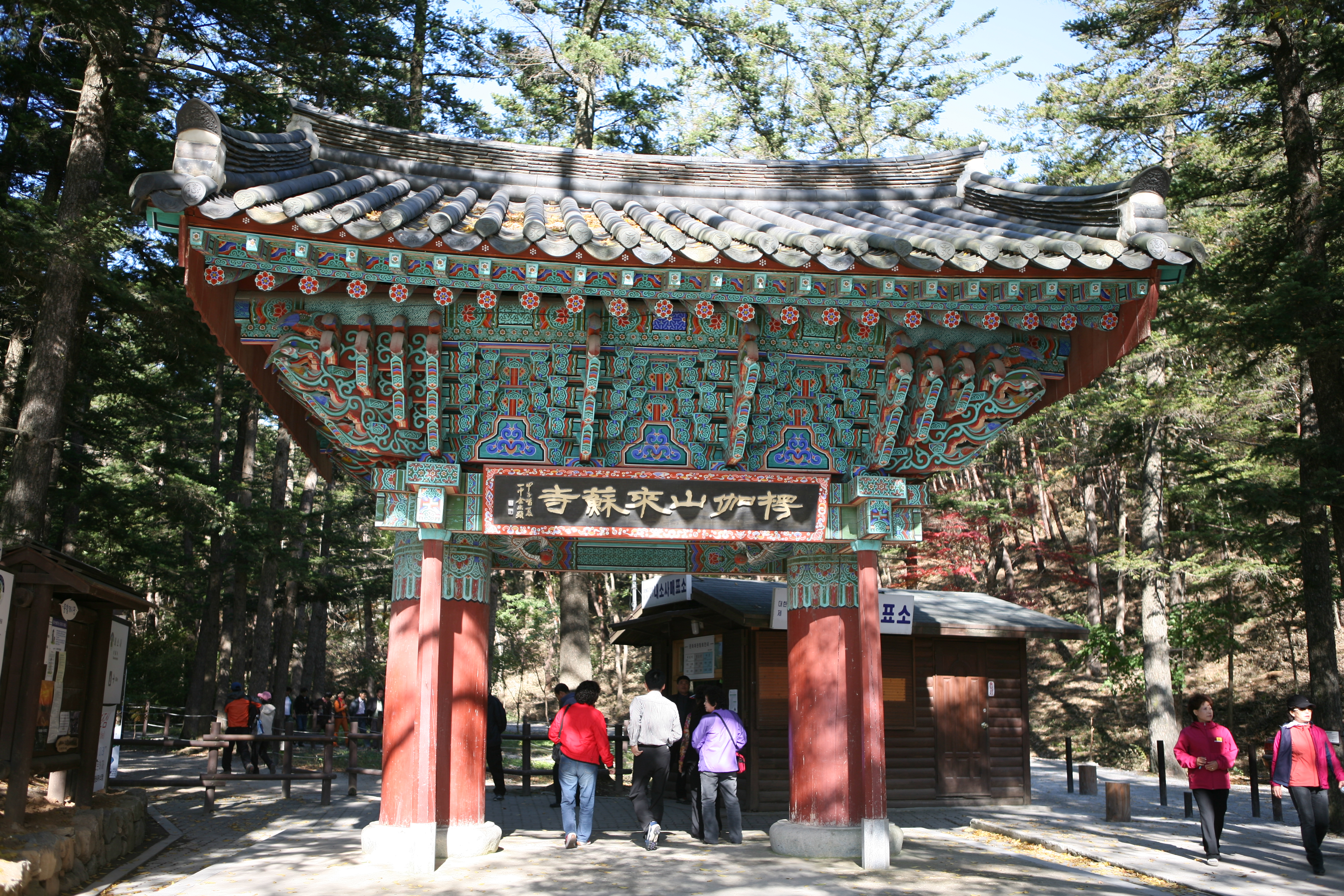
A Korean Iljumun

== See also ==
- Glossary of Hinduism terms
- Toran, ceremonial Indian door decoration
- Torii, in Japan architecture
- Paifang, in Chinese architecture
- Hongsalmun, in Korean architecture with both religious and other usage
- Iljumun, portal in Korean Buddhist architecture
- Shanmen, in Chinese Buddhist architecture
- Tam quan, in Vietnamese Buddhist architecture
