= Aupasana =

Hindu ritual

Aupasana is a yajna performed daily by Hindus who have been initiated during marriage.

Hindu marriage is conducted with offerings made in the fire. Aupasana, which must be performed every day, is commenced in this fire and it must be preserved throughout one's life. The seven pakayajnas (see: Shrauta), rites including upanayana and shraaddha, must be conducted in the aupasana fire. The son lights his aupasana fire during his marriage from his father's aupasana fire. The son's fire, like his father's, must be maintained throughout his life. Thus, without any break, the sacred fire is kept burning in the family generation after generation.

All rites in which the aupasana fire is used and pertain to an individual and his family are "Grhyakarmas". The seven pakayajnas also belong to this category. They are related exclusively to the family and are not very elaborate. Even so, they are conducive to the good of the world outside also. Grhyasutras deal with such rites. They belong to the Smritis and are called "Smarta-karmas".
