= Gita Dhyanam =

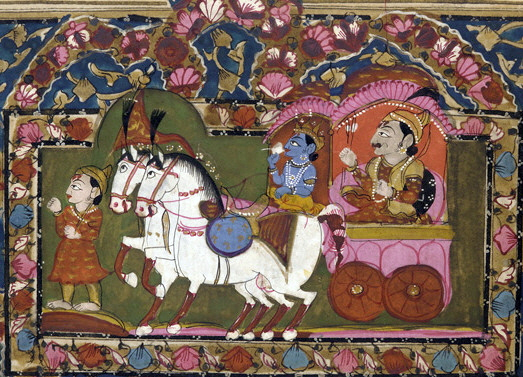
The setting of the Bhagavad Gita: Krishna and Arjuna at Kurukshetra, 18–19th century painting.

The Gītā Dhyānam (Sanskrit: गीता ध्यानम्), also called the Gītā Dhyāna or the Dhyāna Ślokas associated with the Gītā, is a 9-verse Sanskrit poem that has often been attached to the Bhagavad Gita, one of the most important scriptures of Hinduism. In English, its title can be translated literally as "meditation on the Gita," and it is also sometimes called the Invocation to the Gita.

The nine Gita Dhyanam verses offer salutations to a variety of sacred scriptures, figures, and entities, characterize the relationship of the Gita to the Upanishads, and affirm the power of divine assistance. Although differing accounts are given of its origins, the poem is widely circulated in India, and its verses have been quoted by many Hindu leaders.

== Verses ==
Selected verses with translation

English translation

4. The Upanishads are the cows milked by Gopāla, the son of Nanda, and Arjuna is the calf. Wise and pure men drink the milk, the supreme, immortal nectar of the Gita. [4]

8. I bow down to Sri Krishna, the source of all joy, whose compassion brings speech from the lips of the dumb and carries the lame over mountains. [8]

Sanskrit verses

4. सर्वोपनिषदो गावो दोग्धा गोपालनन्दनः।

पार्थो वत्सः सुधीर्भोक्ता दुग्धं गीतामृतं महत्॥ ४ ॥

8. मूकं करोति वाचालं पङ्गुं लंघयते गिरिम् |

यत्कृपा तमहं वन्दे परमानन्द माधवम् ॥ ८ ॥

Sanskrit (transliterated)

4. sarvopaniṣado gāvo dogdhā gopālanandanaḥ |

pārtho vatsaḥ sudhirbhoktā dugdhaṁ gītāmṛtaṁ mahat ॥ 4 ॥

8. mūkaṁ karoti vācālaṁ panguṁ laṅghayate girim |

yatkṛpā tamahaṁ vande paramnandamādhavam ॥ 8 ॥

The Gītā Dhyānam's first verse opens by affirming an act of meditation (anusandadhāmi): "Om. I meditate on the Bhagavad Gītā, which gave enlightenment to Arjuna... by the Lord himself" The Gītā is also affirmed as a mother (bhagavatīm, amba) who rescues from ceaseless change (bhava dveṣiṇīm). The next verse offers salutations to Vyāsa, the traditional recorder of the Gītā. Several additional verses offer salutations (namaḥ, bowing down) to Kṛṣṇa (verses 3, 5, 8), or to the supreme Godhead (devāya, verse 9).

The commonly quoted fourth verse characterizes the Gītā as a distillation of the wisdom of the Upanishads. It uses the image of the Upanishads as like cows, and Arjuna (the person to whom the Gītā is told) as like a calf who is receiving their milk. This and another selected verse are shown in the table at right, in English translation, Sanskrit original, and romanized transliteration.

The eighth verse affirms faith that God (represented in the Gītā as Kṛṣṇa) can work benevolent miracles, such as giving speech to the dumb. This verse, shown in the table, is also commonly quoted.

The remaining Gītā Dhyānam verses extoll the virtues of the Mahābhārata, the larger scripture in which the Gītā is embedded, or describe the challenges and foes overcome by Arjuna, to whom Kṛṣṇa spoke the Gītā (verses 6 and 7).

== Sources ==
Sarvepalli Radhakrishnan and Nataraja Guru each stated that the Gītā Dhyānam is from the Vaiṣṇavīya Tantrasāra. Swami Chinmayananda wrote that the Gītā Dhyānam was "attributed traditionally to the pen of Madhusudana Sarasvati." Swami Ranganathananda wrote that the Gītā Dhyānam verses

are current all over India, and now, in foreign countries also. We don't know who composed them. Some people believe it was Sridhara Swami, a commentator on the Gita and on the Srimad Bhagavatam, who lived about three or four centuries ago.

== Influence ==
Nataraja Guru stated that the Gītā Dhyānam "is found prefixed to most Indian editions of the Gita." Swami Ranganathananda stated that in studying the Gita, "generally, before commencing the study of the text, we study what are called Gita Dhyana Slokas, 'the nine Meditation Verses on the Gita.'"

Hindu leaders have quoted or alluded to verses from the Gītā Dhyānam. Swami Vivekananda wrote from Chicago, following his attendance at the 1893 World Parliament of Religions, that "I am doing the Lord's work, and wherever He leads I follow. मूकं करोति वाचालं etc. - He who makes the dumb eloquent and the lame cross a mountain, He will help me."

Mahatma Gandhi, when praising work done at a school for orphans, wrote that "Seeing the school, I bowed my head in reverence and wondered what love could not do. It can make the dumb speak and the lame climb a mountain."

Swami Ranganathananda wrote with regard to the 8th verse that "Many saints and sages in India have used this verse again and again to express the power of Divine Grace."

== Translations ==
Swami Chinmayananda has published a word-for-word English translation of the Gītā Dhyānam, along with extensive commentary:

- Chinmayananda, Swami (1998). Shreemad Bhagawad Geeta chapter I & II: original Sanskrit text with Roman transliteration, word-for-word meaning, translation and commentary (revised ed.). Mumbai, India: Central Chinmaya Mission Trust. ISBN 81-7597-084-7. ISBN 978-81-7597-084-7 (pp. 1-27)

Other translations into English include:

- Easwaran, Eknath (1975). The Bhagavad Gita for daily living: Commentary, translation, and Sanskrit text. Berkeley, CA: Blue Mountain Center of Meditation. ISBN 0-915132-03-6. OCLC 1322141. (pp. 393–399)
- Sivananda, Swami (2000) [1942]. The Bhagvad-Gita (PDF) (Web ed.). Rishikesh, India: Divine Life Society. OCLC 463526912. Archived from the original (PDF) on 27 September 2011. (pp. 7–8).
- Besant, Annie; Bhagavan Das (1905). The Bhagvad-Gita: With Samskrit text, free translation into English, a word-for-word translation, and an introduction on Samskrit grammar. London and Benares: Theosophical Publishing Society. OCLC 463526912. (pp. xxxii-xxxiii).

The Gītā Dhyānam has also been translated into Italian:

- Sivananda, Swami Saraswati (2005). La bhagavad gita. Traduzione integrale dal sanscrito e commento. L. Porpora (trans.). Edizioni Mediterranee. ISBN 978-88-272-1791-7. ISBN 88-272-1791-6 (pp. 32–33)
