= Chintan =

Chintan is an Indian name. Notable people with the name include:

- Chintan Gaja (born 1994), Indian cricketer
- Chintan Upadhyay (born 1972), Indian artist
- Chintan Vikas (born 1989), Indian singer
