= Hongsalmun =

Traditional Korean gate

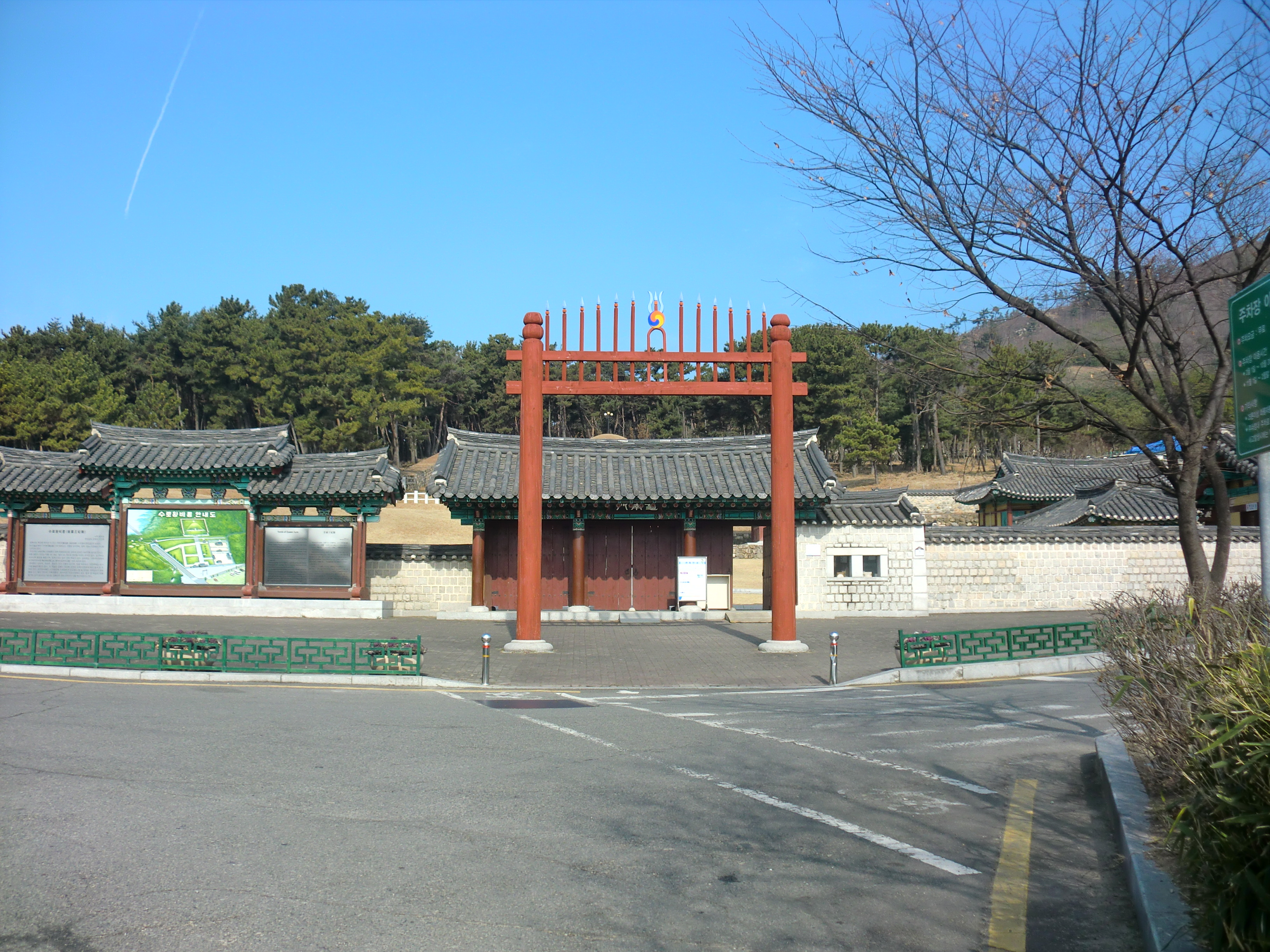
- The hongsalmun at the lleung Royal Tomb (Joseon dynasty royal tombs)

Korean name
- Hangul: 홍살문
- Hanja: 紅살門
- RR: hongsalmun
- MR: hongsalmun

In Korean architecture, a hongsalmun (Korean: 홍살문; Hanja: 紅살門) is a gate for entering a sacred place. Also called hongjeonmun or hongmun, it is usually erected to indicate Korean Confucian sites, such as shrines, tombs, and academies such as hyanggyo and seowon. It is also installed in front of palaces and villages that produced loyal subjects and filial sons. It was first made in the Silla dynasty.

== Features ==
Hongsalmun literally means 'gate with red arrows', referring to the set of pointed spikes on its top. In the past, spikes in between columns did not exist. The color is said to be red because of the belief that the color repels ghosts. The gate is composed of two round poles set vertically and two transverse bars. These pillars are usually over nine meters in height. There is no roof and no door-gate. In the middle top gate the symbol of the trident and the taegeuk image are placed.

The hongsalmun gate opens to a path that leads toward the front of hyanggyo and the hamabi or the "memorial dismount stone". The gate can also be found inside a seowon, a privately owned complex that served as a Confucian shrine and preparatory school.

== Gallery ==
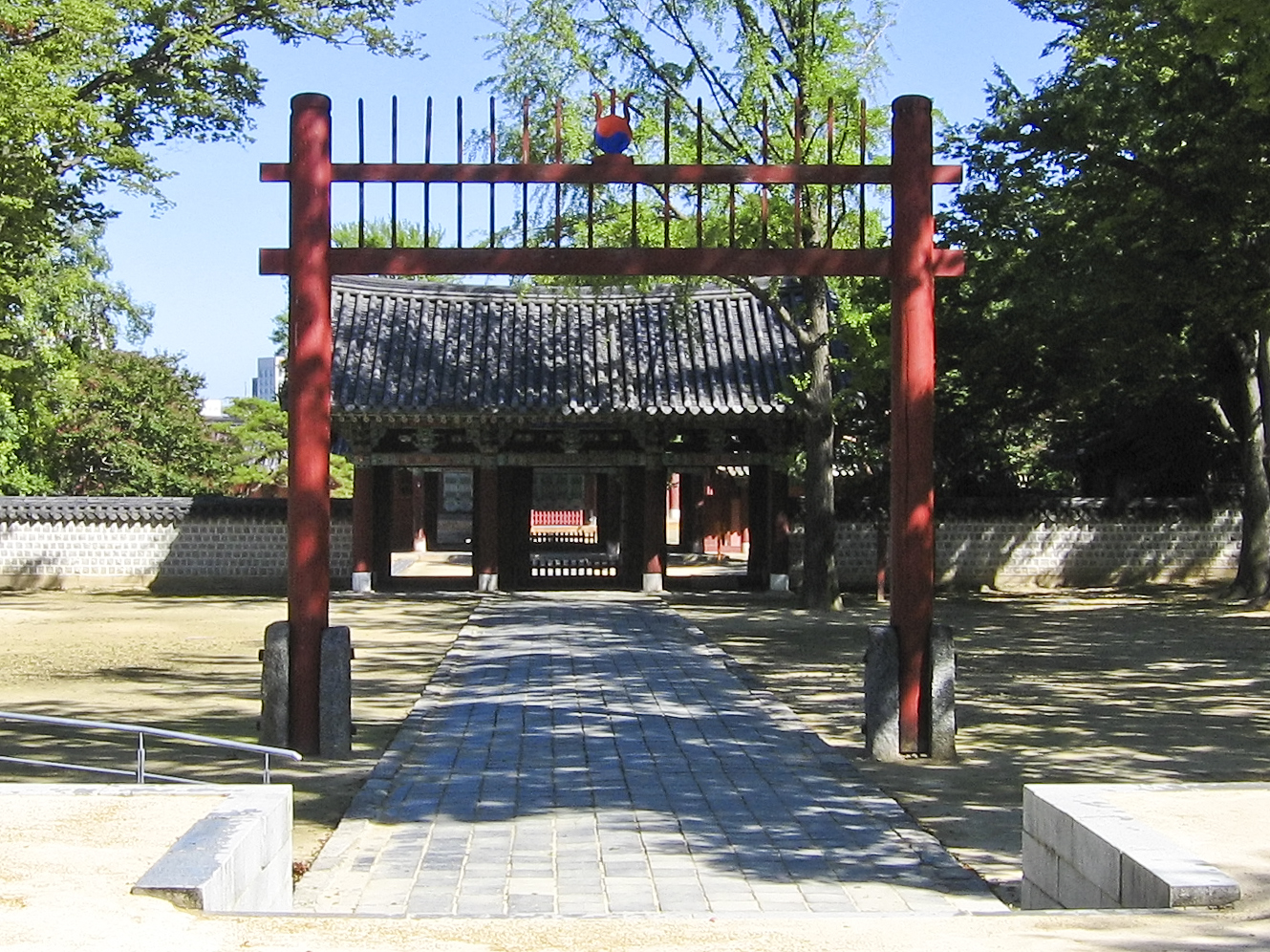
The hongsalmun at the shrine of the clan Yi of Jeonju

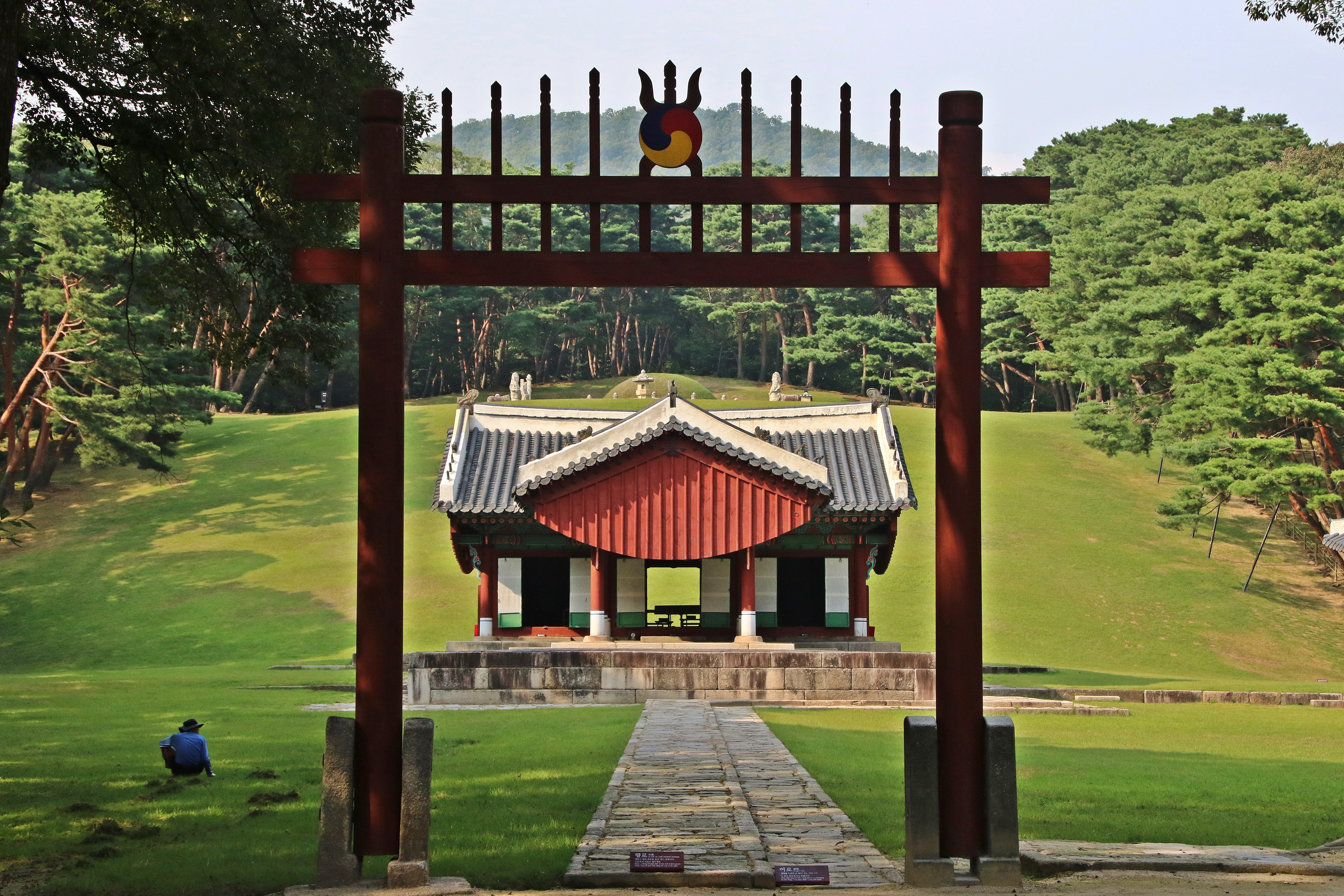
The hongsalmun at the lleung Royal Tomb (Joseon dynasty royal tombs)

== See also ==
- Iljumun, religious portal
- Torana, a type of Hindu-Buddhist gate
- Torii, in Japanese temple architecture
- Paifang, in Chinese temple architecture
- Tam quan, in Vietnamese temple and pagoda architecture
