= Saṃsāra in Hinduism =

Continual cycle of birth, death, and rebirth

In Hinduism, saṃsāra involves the continual cycle of birth, death, and rebirth. Individuals go through this cycle until achieving moksha, or liberation. Samsara is also referred to as bhavsagar in Puranic texts.

== In scriptures ==
The Katha Upanishad, a middle Upanishadic-era script dated to the second half of the first millennium BCE, is among the earliest expositions about saṃsāra and moksha. It gives an analogy of a tree in which Brahman is the root and the birds producing differentiated noise represent samsara.

In the Upanishads, samsara is not just an individual's cyclical movement, but the entire universe being in constant change. Through saṃsāra, the atman passes through different lives in various embodied forms. During the existence of one universe, a living being takes on 8,400,000 births. The concept of samsara is also rooted in the Shvetashvatara Upanishad, which describes the material world as impermanent. It also uses the analogy of a wheel to emphasize the endless and cyclical nature of samsara.

In the Bhagavata Purana, beings in samsara are real ontologically, but unreal in comparison to transcendent reality because they are temporary. It offers an analogy of merchants to compare to the self. The merchants travel through a dense forest to collect wood to sell. However, they get lost and face difficulties. Similarly, the self wanders in samsara looking to fulfill selfish desires.

== Nature of Suffering ==
Shankara compares suffering in samsara to being in a dream. Ramanuja sees the experience in samsara and once freed from samsara as the same for all beings. Freedom from samsara holds the same level of bliss for everyone. Madhva describes three types of beings in samsara: 1) those who will eventually be freed, 2) those who reincarnate forever, and 3) those destined for hell.

There are three categories of suffering in samsara.

1. ādhyātmika (related to the body)
  1. Example: disease and anxiety
2. ādibhautika (related to the elements)
  1. Example: extreme weather
3. ādidaivika (accidental; unknowable cause)

Miseries cannot be avoided, but they can be dissolved by removing ignorance.

== Cause and End ==
From a cosmological view, samsara applies to Brahma, too, who disappears and reappears every 100 Brahma years.

According to Yajnavalkya, desire toward the world is what causes saṃsāra to continue. Shankara, too, writes that desire is the root of rebirth. Saṃsāra is closely tied to karma, which influences the circumstances of life. According to the Bhagavata, the self learns from impressions from past lives and progresses in samsara. Time is what drives the cycle of samsara. Hindu theologians discuss karma and samsara together, since all actions are binding and prevent moksha.

The concept of samsara translates to a significant view of social mobility. At the cosmic level, status is temporary and can change drastically from one life to another. However, mobility is not valued in itself as any status is bound in worldly suffering and disappears at death.

In Hinduism, release from samsara is only possible through birth as a human. While moksha is release from samsara, however, the two are not necessarily opposed because one may experience moksha during one's life. The purpose behind Hindu cremation rituals is to allow the individual to attain a higher life form in the next birth, or be freed from the cycle altogether. The Mokshopaya sees true knowledge about samsara as critical for moksha. Moksha requires correct knowledge of one's own self as the atman, and of the illusory objects of samsara. Another approach toward liberation from samsara is articulated through yoga. Restraint of the senses is put forward as a way to reduce attachment to samsara.

== Depictions ==
In the form of Shiva as Nataraja, samsara is depicted as a circle of flames.
