= Uttanka =

Sage in the Mahabharata

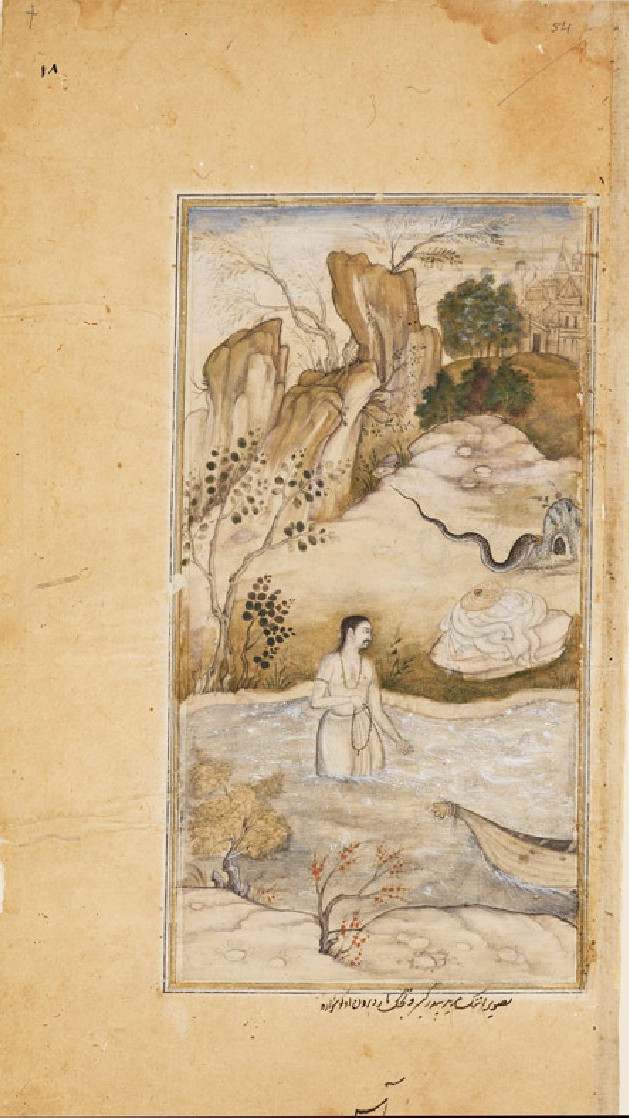
Takshaka steals earrings from Uttanaka. Illustrated by Asi in a folio of Razmnama.

Uttanka (Sanskrit: उत्तङ्क) is a rishi (sage) featured in Hindu literature. He is described to have resided in the Maru desert. The primary source of this account is found in the Hindu epic Mahabharata.

In the earliest version, Uttanka is described as the disciple of the sage Veda. In the second version, his guru is Gautama. In both legends, he is a learned sage who goes through many hurdles in procuring the earrings demanded by his guru's wife as the fee for the teacher (gurudakshina).

Uttanka asks the king Saudasa who was cursed by Vasistha to become a cannibal for earrings without any fear and manages to receive it from his wife Madayanti, who before giving it to him warns that the earrings are celestial, and that he should not by any means put it heedlessly. If he were to do so it would be stolen by higher beings who are always looking for a chance to have them. During his return, from hunger he tries to pluck fruits from a tree and drops those earrings and a Nagas (serpents) steal the earrings, and later the gods Indra and Agni help Uttanka to retrieve them from the realm of the serpents. Uttanka is said to have advised King Janamejaya to take revenge against Takshaka, the king of the Nagas, as the latter was responsible for his father Parikshit's death by snake bite.

Uttanka is one of the few persons described to have seen the Vishvarupa (universal form) of the god Krishna. Krishna blessed Uttanka with a boon that would quench his thirst whenever he remembered him. From then on, the rare clouds that bring showers in the desert have been called "Uttanka's clouds".

== Gurudakshina ==
Uttanka's legend is narrated in the Hindu epic Mahabharata in two versions. The first is the original narrated in the Paushya Parva chapter of the first Book, Adi Parva. The other version is in the Utankopakhyana (named after Uttanka) in the Ashvamedhika Parva, the 14th Book of the epic. A work in Malayalam, also called Utankopakhyana, is another recounting of the story from the 14th book, but uses the name Utanka, not Uttanka. The Ashvamedhika Parva version is believed to be a later retelling of the original account in the Adi Parva.

=== Adi Parva ===
According to the Adi Parva, Uttanka was one of three chief disciples of the sage Veda, who in turn was a student of Ayoda Dhaumya.

Once, Veda left his ashram (hermitage), entrusting all of the administrative duties to Uttanka. Veda's wife was then in her menstrual period. The women of the ashram urged Uttanka to cohabit with her so that her fertility period would not be wasted, but Uttanka refused to oblige as he was duty bound to his guru and he considered the act immoral. When this episode was conveyed to Veda upon his return to the ashram, he was pleased with his disciple and blessed Uttanka.

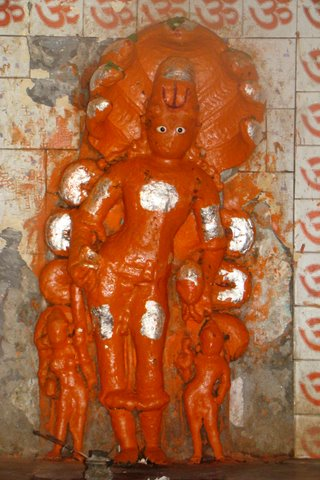
Takshaka (pictured) stole the earrings that Uttanka acquired to be given as gurudakshina.

After Uttanka completed his education, he asked his guru Veda about gurudakshina (fee to the teacher). Veda suggested that he should ask his wife and give him the gift that she desired. The guru's wife harboured a grudge against Uttanka, as he had refused to fulfil her desire in her fertility period. She asked Uttanka to get the earrings of King Pushya's queen in three days so that she could wear them during a religious fast on the fourth day. Uttanka set out to accomplish the task. On the way, he encountered a giant who was riding a huge bullock and sought his blessings. The giant asked Uttanka to eat the dung and drink the urine of the animal. Uttanka hesitated but ultimately complied after being informed that his guru, Veda, had acted likewise. Uttanka then went to King Pushya and conveyed to him the wish of his guru's wife for the earrings of his queen so that he could pay his gurudakshina. The king asked Uttanka to meet his wife in her chambers. However, he could not find the queen there. Pushya informed Uttanka that his queen does not appear before any impure person who has not performed the ritual ablutions. After performing the ablutions, Uttanka met the queen and asked her for the earrings, which she granted. She warned Uttanka that Takshaka, the king of Nagas (serpents), was after the divine earrings and he should therefore take guard against him.

After Uttanka had met the queen, he was invited to dine with the king. The food was cold and had a hair in it. Enraged, the sage cursed the king that he would lose his sight. In turn, the king cursed Uttanka that he would not have any children. However, they reconciled and withdrew their curses.

As Uttanka was returning to Veda's ashram, he decided to take a bath in a water tank. He left his things on the bank of the river and went to take a bath. At that time, Takshaka came there in the disguise of a naked mendicant and stole the earrings. Uttanka tried to pursue the mendicant, but Takshaka had reverted to his original form of a serpent and slithered away into a hole in the ground, reaching Naga-loka, the abode of the Nagas. Uttanka then tried to dig through the hole. Indra, the king of the gods, saw Uttanka in the process of digging and sent his weapon Vajra (thunder-bolt) to help him carve a tunnel to the realm of the Nagas. When Uttanka entered the snake world, he started praising the virtues of the snake king Takshaka and his clan, but to no avail as Takshaka was not moved to give up the earrings. Uttanka then saw two beautiful women weaving with white and black threads on a wheel fixed on the wall. The wheel had twelve spokes and was being turned by six young people. A horse with a rider stood near the wheel. Uttanka praised the functioning of the weaving process, the rider and the horse, and equated the rider to Indra. Pleased with this praise, the rider asked Uttanka to state in what way he could help him. Uttanka requested that he be given the power to bring the snakes under his control. The rider then instructed Uttanka to blow at the back of the horse. Uttanka did as suggested. Then flames emerged from all parts of the horse's body and filled the realm of the serpents with fire and smoke. The terrified Takshaka came out of hiding and gave up the earrings to Uttanka. Uttanka then wondered whether he could reach his guru Veda's ashram to hand over the earrings to the guru's wife before the prescribed time. The rider, noting Uttanka's concern, gave Uttanka his horse, which took Uttanka to the ashram. He reached the ashram just before sunset as the guru's wife was in the process of casting a curse on Uttanka for not arriving in time. When Uttanka narrated his experience in procuring the earrings, the guru and his wife blessed him. Veda then explained to Uttanka the significance of the sights he had seen in Nagaloka. The two women engaged in weaving were Dhata and Vidhata; they were creating the world and all its creatures. The threads were day and night. The wheel with twelve spokes was the year with 360 days. The six boys were the seasons. The giant and bullock were Indra and his elephant Airavata. Its dung was amrita (elixir of life), which kept Uttanka alive in Nagaloka. The rider and horse in Nagaloka were Indra and the fire-god Agni. Veda also explained to Uttanka that his friend, Indra, had helped him during his journey.

After handing over the earrings and taking leave of his guru, Uttanka went to Hastinapur, the kingdom of King Janamejaya. He resolved to teach a lesson to Takshaka who had caused him trouble. He informed Janamejaya that it was Takshaka who had killed his father Parikshit and advised Janamejaya to perform a snake sacrifice to exterminate the serpents. Uttanka was one of the rishis who participated in the Sarpa Satra yagna initiated by the king. Sarpa Satra was meant to draw all serpents to the sacrificial fire to certain death by the chanting of mantras. After the serpents started falling into the sacrificial fire, Takshaka was not to be found anywhere. Uttanka then recited the mantras with great vigour to draw Takshaka to the fire. In mortal fear, Taskshaka took shelter with Indra and got himself tied to the throne of Indra for protection. Uttanka, who realised that Takshaka had taken refuge with Indra, intensified his mantras to ensure that not only Takshaka but also Indra along with his throne were drawn to the fire. Indra freed the snake from the throne and escaped. However, when Takshaka was about to drop to death into the sacrificial fire, Astika, a young boy well versed in scriptures, son of the sage Jaratkaru intervened with Janamejaya. Astika ensured that the Sarpa Satra was stopped and the life of Takshaka was saved.

=== Ashvamedhika Parva ===
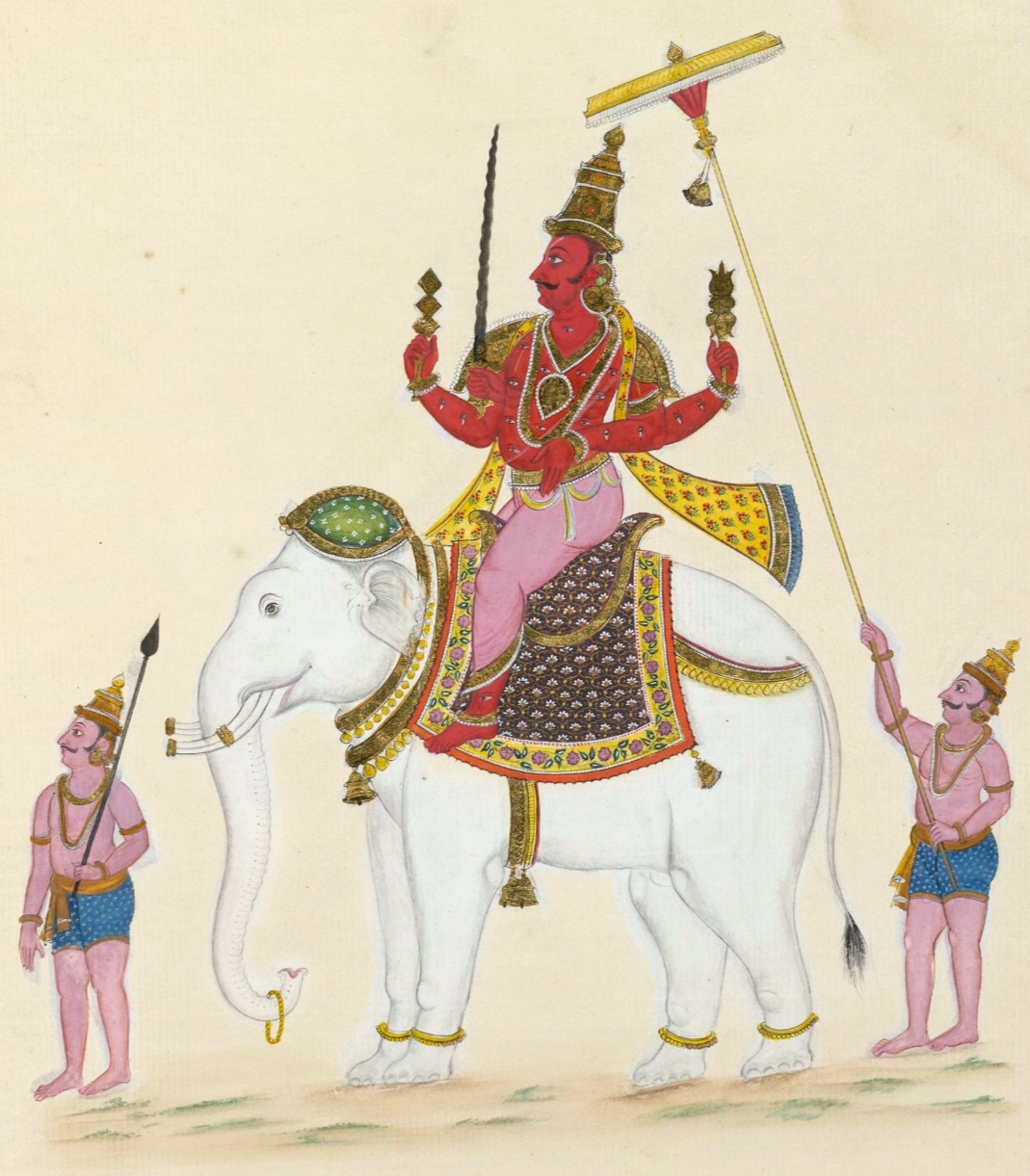
The god Indra (pictured) is described as having helped Uttanka recover the stolen earrings.

In the Ashvamedhika Parva the tale is narrated with some variation. Uttanka is described as a brahmin who belonged to the Bhrigu race that lived in a hermitage in the Maru desert. Uttanka was the disciple of the sage Gautama, whom he served for a hundred years. Uttanka was very dear to Gautama, who did not let him go even after Uttanka had completed his education. Uttanka grew old over time. One day Uttanka collapsed while carrying a huge bundle of firewood. Gautama's daughter cried looking at the sight. When called by his guru, Uttanka accosted Gautama, and with tears in his eyes asked him why he alone had been retained in the hermitage when thousands of other disciples had been discharged after training. Gautama restored Uttanka's youth, gave his daughter in marriage to Uttanka and then permitted him to leave.

Uttanka wanted to give the sage his gurudakshina. The guru told him to meet his wife Ahalya and inquire as to her wish. Ahalya suggested that he bring her the divine earrings of Madayanti, King Mitrasaha Saudasa's wife, as gurudakshina. The king had turned into a cannibalistic rakshasa by a curse and was known as Kalmashapada. Uttanka met Kalmashapada, who approached Uttanka to eat him, but Uttanka stopped him and explained that he was duty-bound to get Madayanti's earrings as gurudakshina and that he, Uttanka, would return to Kalmashapada after fulfilling his obligation. Kalmashapada agreed and directed him to his wife, who refused to part with her earrings until Uttanka brought some token from Kalmashapada as proof of his consent. Upon returning from Kalmashapada with a token, Madayanti gave him the earrings. The queen warned Uttanka that her earrings were coveted by Nagas, Yakshas, rakshasas and the gods, who would try to steal them. Uttanka was therefore advised not to allow the earrings to touch the ground to prevent the snakes from taking possession of them.

On the way back to the ashram, Uttanka had tied the earrings in a deerskin. While travelling, he stopped and climbed a tree to pluck some fruit for his refreshment. He tied the deerskin to a branch, but the deerskin became untied and the earrings fell on the ground. A snake immediately got hold of the earrings and vanished into an ant-hill. In grief, Uttanka fell from the tree. For 35 days, he dug the ant-hill with a stick to get the snake out and retrieve the earrings. The earth began to shake due to the repeated strikes. At that time, Indra – riding his chariot – saw Uttanka's futile efforts. As in the Adi Parva, Indra used his Vajra to enable Uttanka to enter the beautiful Nagaloka. There, Uttanka saw a horse with the "tail which had black and white hair, a copper-coloured muzzle, and eye of the same colour that seemed to flame forth in splendor". The horse told Uttanka to blow from behind, as in the Adi Parva version. The horse was the fire god Agni who was the guru of Gautama, who had offered his help to retrieve the earrings. When Uttanka followed the directive of the horse, flames and smoke emerged from every pore of the horse and choked the dwellings of the snakes. Thus choked, the serpents, headed by Vasuki came out, worshipped Uttanka and surrendered the earrings and asked that they be pardoned. When Uttanka returned to the hermitage of Gautama to give the earrings to Ahalya, he narrated the sequence of events that occurred in procuring the earrings.

== Meeting Krishna ==
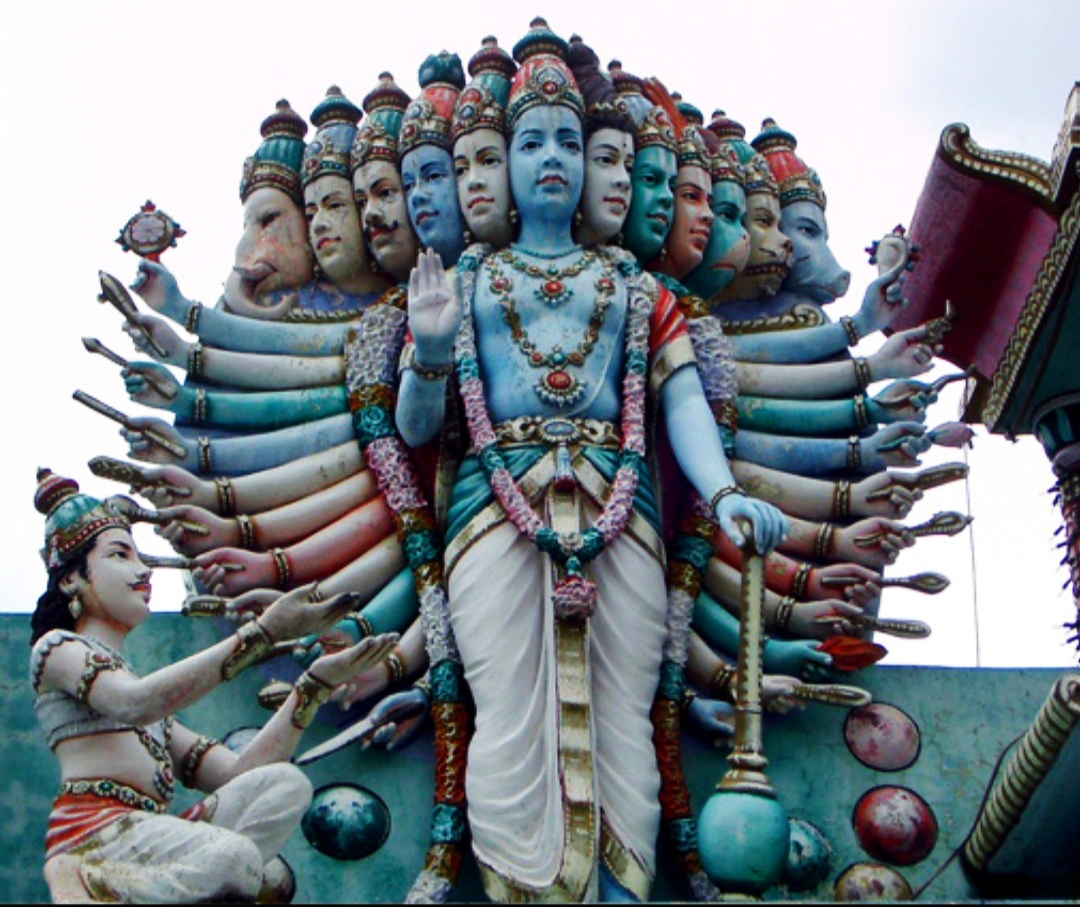
Vishvarupa of Krishna as seen by Arjuna. Krishna is also described as having shown this form to Uttanka.

The Ashvamedhika Parva narrates Uttanka's meeting with the god Krishna. As Krishna was returning to his kingdom Dwarka, he noticed the wandering ascetic Uttanka. Uttanka met Krishna and asked for news. Krishna told about the devastation in the Kurukshetra War. Uttanka was agitated and was about to curse Krishna for not bringing about a compromise between the warring cousins Pandavas and Kauravas. Krishna explained the necessity of war for restoration of dharma and revealed his Vishvarupa form to Uttanka. The sage bowed to Krishna. Krishna told Uttanka to ask for a boon. Uttanka asked Krishna to grant him the boon of finding water whenever he was thirsty. Krishna granted the boon to Uttanka. Uttanka was one of the blessed people to have had an opportunity to see Sri Krishna's vishvarupa. The other people who also had this privilege were Akrura, Arjuna, Dhritarashtra, Sanjaya, Yashoda and Veda Vyasa.

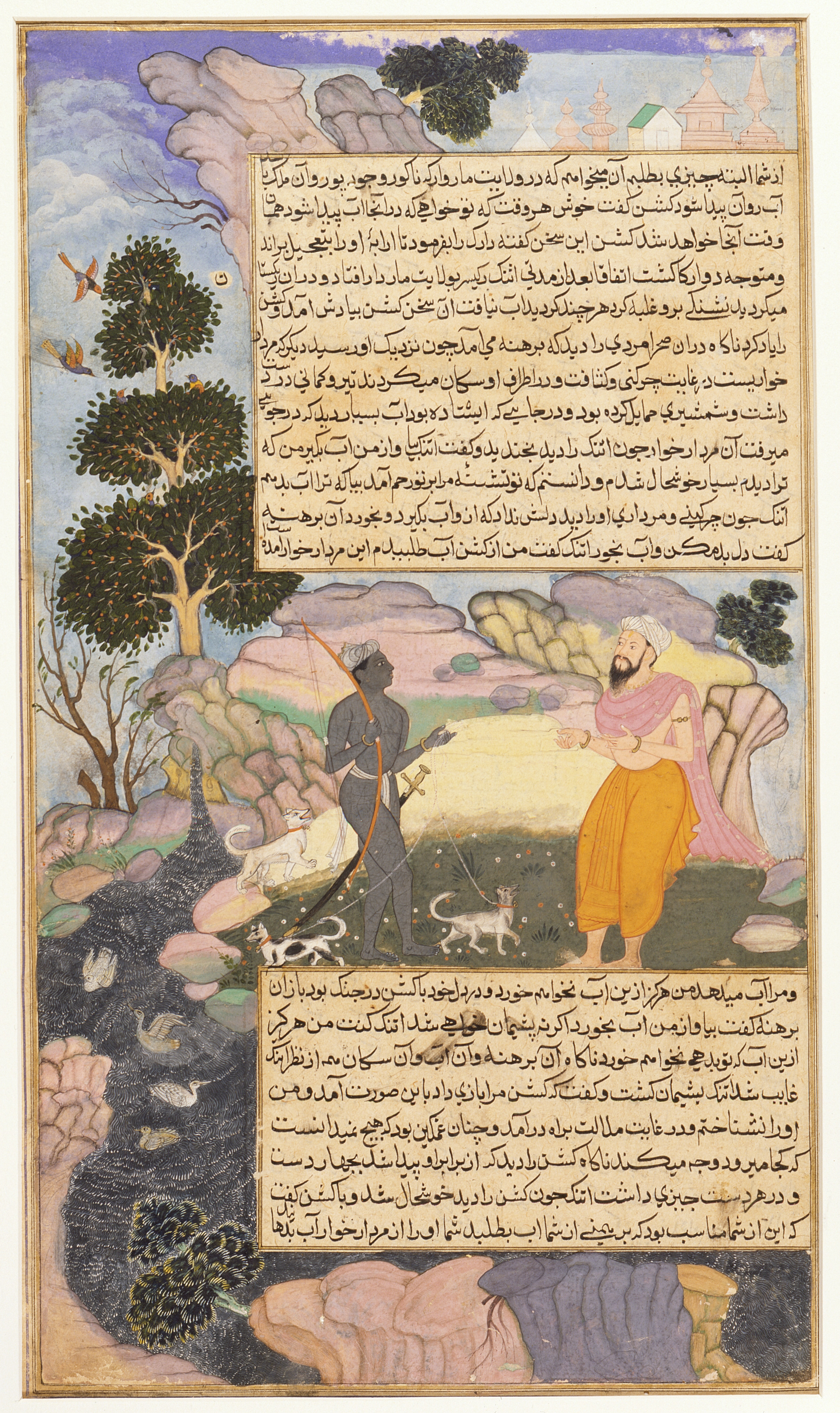
The Brahman Uttanka Meets Indra, who is Disguised as an Outcast Chandala, Folio from a Razmnama (The Book of War)

Wandering in the desert, the sage became thirsty and, hoping to get water, thought of Krishna, who gave order Indra and asked him to give amrita to Uttanka but Indra was not willing to give it to mortals. In the end, Indra had told Krishna that he would offer Uttanka the amrita as a Chandala, provided the sage did not refuse it. Krishna had agreed to Indra's condition. Indra appeared as hunter called Chandala but Uttang refused to take water from him and he disappeared. Uttanka, realizing his mistake that ordinary men cannot appear in this desert, either he was a Deva or messenger of Krishana. So Uttanka started to finish himself, Then when Krishna appeared on the scene and stopped him to burn his body by Tapa, Krishna explained that he had requested Indra to give him amrita, Krishna then informed Uttanka that his refusal to accept amrita from the Chandala was improper. Finally, Indra had relented and had told Krishna that he would offer Uttanka the amrita as a Chandala, provided the sage did not refuse it. Krishna had agreed to Indra's condition. Krishna promised to keep his boon of providing water to the sage. He then blessed Uttanka that rain clouds would appear at his bidding and bring rain showers in the desert. These clouds appear rarely, and in the desert rain clouds are still known as Uttanka's clouds (Uttanka Megha).

== Other legends ==
The Vana Parva book of the Mahabharata narrates that an asura (demon) named Dhundhu lived under the sands of the desert of Ujjalaka, in Marudhanva. Dhundu terrorized the whole world. Upset by Dhundu's action, Uttanka – whose ashram was in Ujjalaka – performed tapas (austerities) dedicated to Vishnu. Pleased, Vishnu told Uttanka that the Ikshvaku king Kulavalashva, possessing part of his power, would slay the demon. The sage went to the king Vrihadaswa, who was retiring into woods, recounted him Vishnu's prophecy. King then commended his son Kuvalasva to obey the behest of Utanka, himself retired into forest. King Kuvalasva, with more than twenty-one thousands troop accompanied by his son and Brahmana Uttanka, set out for that region. While travelling, Vishnu filled him with part of his own energy. The demon Dhundhu had a boon from Grandsire, of not being killed by anyone possessing divinity. He was living in western region, beneath sea of sands. King with his man excavated it, and found huge body Asura lying beneath it. Surrounded by all, the Danava was assaulted with sharp weapons. And enraged, the Asura baffled all of their weapons, and started to vomit fiery flames, achieving wonderful feat of consuming all of his troops in a moment. The King, possessed of mighty energy, then approached him, extinguished his flames with force, discharging stream of water, and consumed him in a moment by using Brahma weapon. Out of all sons being slaughtered, three of his son survived. He was then granted several boons by gods and Rishis, who became gratified with that encounter. As a result, Kulavalashva became known as Dhundhumara, the slayer of Dhundhu.

The Naradiya Purana narrates that Uttanka lived in an ashram in Ujjalaka. In his old age, he left for a pilgrimage and travelled to various temples. Once, the sage saw a hunter named Gulika stealing the golden plates of the temple of Vishnu at Sauvira. Gulika tried to kill the sage. Then Uttanka informed Gulika that the sin of murder would be to live through many births to expiate his sin. Hearing this the hunter was penitent and fell dead. Uttanka then sprinkled water from the holy Ganges on the hunter's corpse, which restored Gulika who then attained Vaikuntha, the abode of Vishnu. As advised by Vishnu, Uttanka went to Badari, performed tapas and attained Vaikuntha himself.
