= Nāgakanyā =

Female serpent being in Indian religious traditions

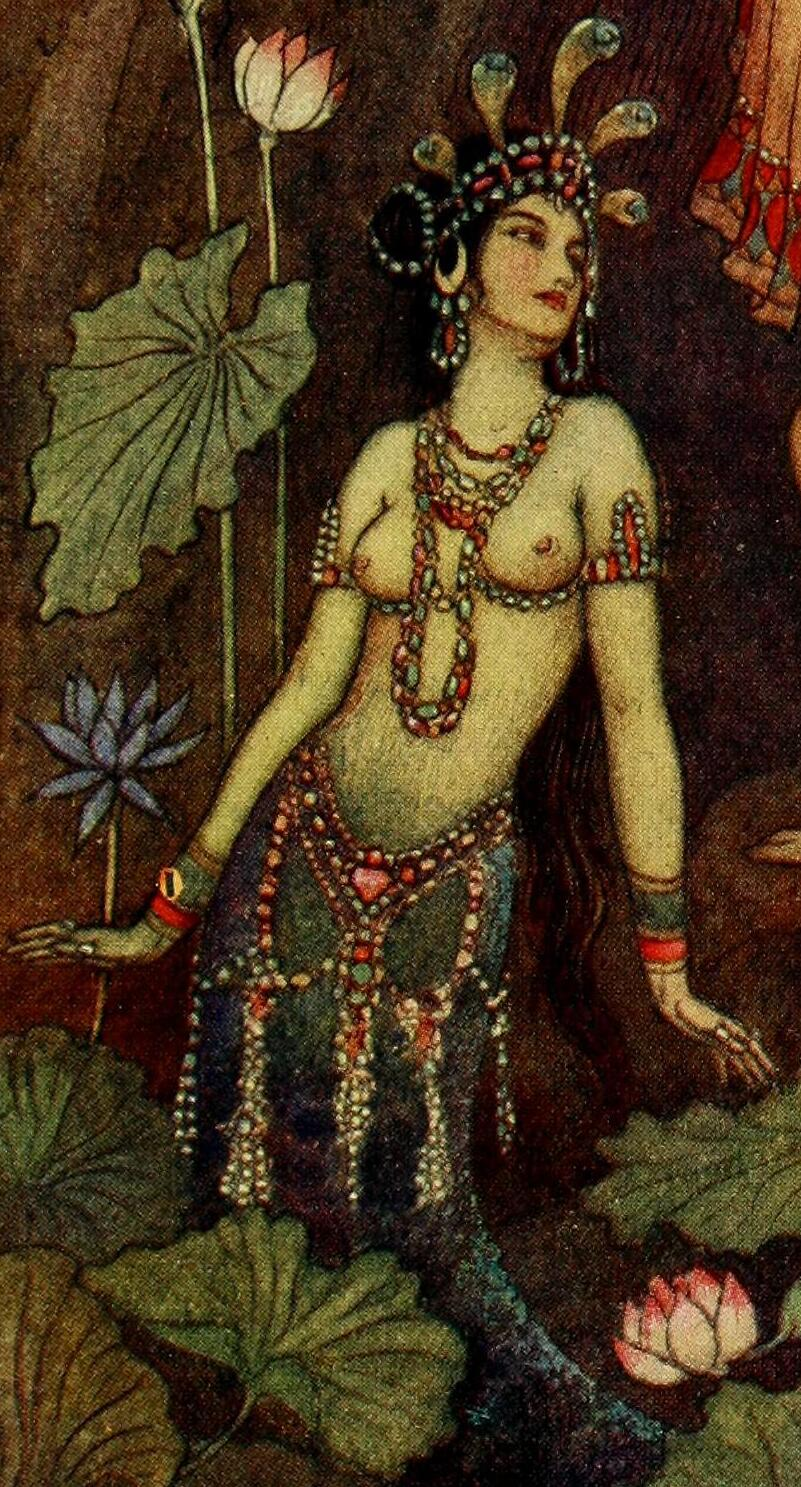
Ulupi, a Nāga princess in the Mahabharata.

Nāgakanyā (नागकन्या, "serpent maiden") is a Sanskrit name for a female Nāga, a serpent being in Indian religious traditions. Nāga maidens appear in Hindu, Buddhist, and Jain stories. They also appear in Tibetan and Southeast Asian traditions.

== Appearance ==
Nāga maidens are shown in several forms. Some look human but have cobra hoods above their heads. Others have human upper bodies and serpent tails. They are also called nāginīs.

Nāga maidens are sometimes shown beside Nāga kings. They also appear in Nepalese religious art. A bronze figure at the National Museum of Nepal shows Nāgakanyā sitting on a makara beneath nine cobra hoods. She holds a conch in her right hand.

== As a goddess ==
Nāgakanyā is also shown as a goddess in Indian art. A sandstone statue from central India shows her sitting on a lion throne beneath seven cobra heads. She holds lotus flowers. The statue was described as a goddess of fertility who brings water and life.

== In Hinduism ==
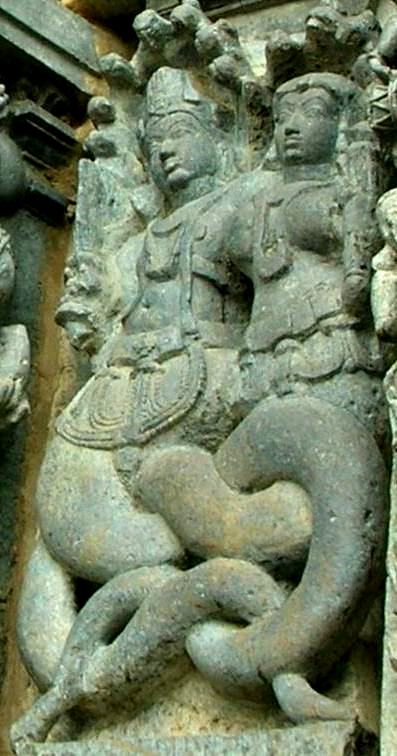
Serpent figures at the Chennakeshava Temple, Belur.

In the Mahabharata, Ulupi is a Nāga princess and the daughter of Kauravya, a serpent king. She meets Arjuna during his exile and takes him to her underwater home. They marry and have a son named Iravan, who later fights in the Kurukshetra War.

Another Nāga maiden is Jaratkaru, the sister of Vasuki. She marries a sage who has the same name. Their son, Astika, later stops King Janamejaya from killing the Nāgas in a great sacrifice.

== In Buddhism ==
In the Lotus Sutra, the eight-year-old daughter of the Nāga king Sāgara is praised for her wisdom by Manjushri. Shariputra and the bodhisattva Prajñākūṭa doubt that she can quickly become a Buddha. She offers a precious jewel to the Buddha, changes into a male, and attains Buddhahood in a southern world.

Akiko Koyama found that some Sanskrit manuscripts of the Lotus Sutra describe the Dragon Girl becoming a bodhisattva while still female. She found that older manuscripts were more likely to use the female form.

In Chinese Buddhism, Sāgara's daughter is called Longnü (龍女), or Dragon Girl. She also appears as an attendant of Guanyin.

== In Tibetan traditions ==
In Tibetan, a female Nāga is called a klu mo (ཀླུ་མོ). Nāga maidens appear in Tibetan stories, including the Epic of King Gesar. In one account, Gesar's mother is a klu mo named Klu-mo-vgog-mo. She dreams of a yellow man who becomes Gesar's father. He is identified as the mountain god Anyesrmachen.

== In Jainism ==
Nāga maidens also appear in Jain stories. In Hemachandra's Triṣaṣṭiśalākāpuruṣacaritra, King Brahmadatta meets a Nāga maiden near a pool. He sees her approach a boa constrictor in the form of a female serpent and strikes them with a whip. She later tells her husband, a Nāga prince, that the king attacked her. The prince confronts Brahmadatta but leaves after hearing his account.

In another story, King Sumukha sees a woman named Vanamālā, the wife of a weaver. He wonders whether she is a Nāga maiden who has come to Earth.

== In Southeast Asian traditions ==
In Cambodian legends, a prince named Preah Thaong marries a Nāga princess named Neang Neak. Her father, the Nāga king, drinks the water covering the land and gives the new land to the couple.

In another version, the princess is called Somā and the prince is Kauṇḍinya. These stories are also told in accounts of the founding of Funan.

== Comparisons with Chinese mythology ==
Priyadarshi Mukherji compared Nüwa and Fuxi with Indian Nāgas and Nāginīs. He noted that Nüwa has a snake's lower body in Han dynasty brick paintings. He compared these figures with carvings of intertwined Nāgas and Nāginīs at the Belur temple in India. He also described both pairs as symbols of childbirth.

Christina Miu Bing Cheng also compared Nüwa and Fuxi with Indian Nāga figures. She noted that Han dynasty tomb art shows Nüwa and Fuxi with human heads and intertwined serpent tails, resembling Nāgas and Nāginīs in Indian art.

== See also ==
- Nāga
- Longnü
- Ulupi
- Jaratkaru
- Neang Neak
- Sagara (Dragon King)
