= Adi Parva =

First book of the Mahabharata

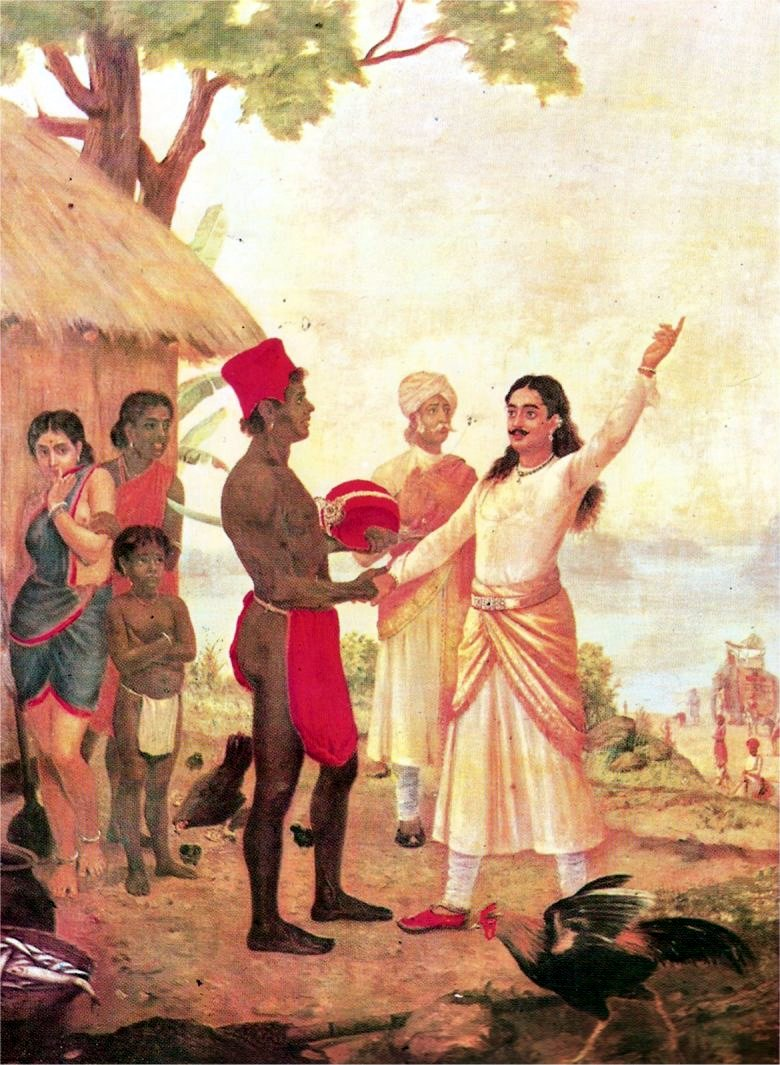
Bhishma taking his bhishma pratigya (oath) is shown in Adi Parva, painting by Raja Ravi Varma

The Adi Parva ("Book of the Beginning") is the first of the eighteen parvas (books) of the Indian epic Mahabharata. "Ādi" (आदि) in Sanskrit means "first". Adi Parva traditionally has 19 parts and 236 adhyayas (chapters). The critical edition of Adi Parva has 19 parts and 225 chapters.

Adi Parva describes how the epic came to be recited by Ugrasrava Sauti to the assembled rishis at the Naimisha Forest after first having been narrated at the sarpasatra of Janamejaya by Vaishampayana at Taxila. It includes an outline of contents from the eighteen books, along with the book's significance. The history of the Bhāratas and the Bhrigus are described. The main part of the work covers the birth and early life of the princes of the Kuru kingdom and the persecution of the Pandavas by Dhritarashtra.

== Structure and chapters ==
The Adi Parva consists of 19 upa-parvas (parts, little books). Each part is also called a parva and is further subdivided into chapters, for a total of 236 chapters.

=== Anukramanika Parva (chapter: 1) ===
Sauti meets the Rishis led by Shaunaka in Naimisha Forest. They express a desire to hear Mahabharata. He explains the stories of creation to them. He narrates the story of how the Mahabharata was written. This parva describes the significance of Mahabharata, claims comprehensive synthesis of all human knowledge, and why it must be studied.

=== Sangraha Parva (chapter: 2) ===
Story of Samantha Panchaka. Definition of Akshauhini in an army. Outline of contents of 18 books of Mahabharata.

=== Paushya Parva (chapter: 3) ===
Story of Sarama's curse on Janamejaya, of Aruni, Upamanyu and Veda (The disciples of Sage Dhaumya) and of Uttanka, Paushya and sage Veda.

=== Pauloma Parva (chapters: 4–12) ===
History of the Bhargava race of men. Story of Chyavana's birth.

=== Astika Parva (chapters: 13–58) ===
Story of the Churning of the Ocean. Theories on dharma, worldly bondage and release. Story of the Sarpa Satra including Janamejaya's vow to kill all snakes, step to annihilate them with a sacrificial fire, decision to apply Ahimsa (non-violence) to snakes and all life forms. Story of birth of Astika. Story of how Vaishampayana came to narrate the Mahabharata to Janamejaya.

=== Adivansavatarana (Anshavatarana) Parva (chapters: 59–64) ===
History of Pandava and Kuru princes. Stories of Shantanu, Bhishma and Satyavati. Stories of Karna's birth, Lord Krishna's birth and of and Animandavya. Appeal to Brahma that the gods should reincarnate to save the chaos that earth has become.

=== Sambhava Parva (chapters: 65–142) ===
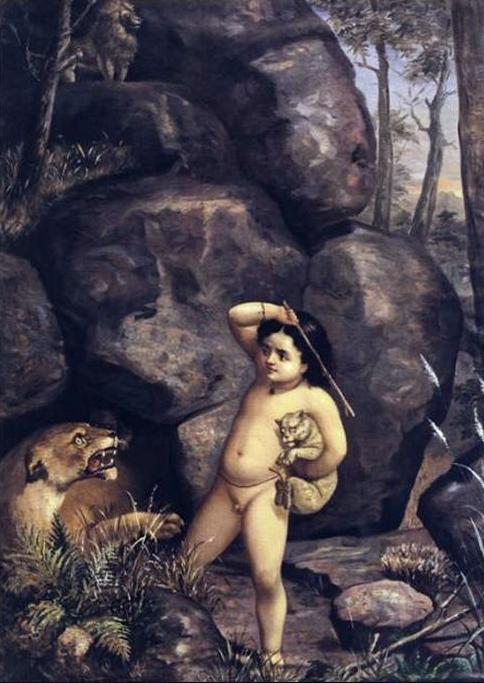
Bharata, the son of Sakuntala, after her love marriage with Dushyanta. Their courtship and love affair is described in Sambhava Parva.

Theory of life on earth and of gods. Story of Dronacharya, Kripacharya, Ashwatthama and other sages. Story of Dushyanta and Shakuntala. Story of Bharata's birth. Sakuntala goes to Dushyanta with the boy. He first refuses to remember her and their marriage but later apologizes and accepts. Bharata becomes prince. Stories of Yayati, Devayani and Sharmishtha. Stories of Yadu, Puru and the Paurava race of men. The Pandava brothers retreat into the forest, chased by Dhritarashtra. The stories the Swayamvara of Kunti, marriage of Madri and marriage of Vidura. Attempts to reconcile the conflict between Kauravas and Pandavas.

=== Jatugriha (Jatugriha-daha) Parva (chapters: 143–153) ===
Kanika counsels Dhritarashtra on how to rule a kingdom and on how deception is an effective tool for governance and war, against enemies and potential competition. Kanika narrates his symbolic tale about jackal, tiger, mouse, mongoose and deer and he advises that a weak ruler should ignore his own weaknesses and focus on other people's weakness and pretend to be friends while being cruel and destructive to others, particularly when the competition is good and stronger. Dhritarashtra schemes to build a home for Pandavas in the forest, from lacquer and other flammable materials as a friendly gesture, but with plans to burn them alive on the darkest night. Kanika's theory is called wicked and evil by Vidura, a sage of true knowledge and the good, who is also the advisor and friend to Pandavas. Vidura and Pandavas plan escape by building a tunnel inside the flammable house. The fire is lit and the Pandavas escape. Dhritarashtra falsely believes Pandavas are dead. Duryodhana is pleased and sets on ruling the kingdom.

=== Hidimva-vadha Parva (chapters: 154–158) ===
The story of the wanderings of Pandava brothers after the escape from the fire. Story of Bhima and the Rakshashi Hidimba. She falls in love with Bhima and refuses to help her brother. The story of the battle between Bhima and Hidimba's demon brother, Hidimbasur, showing the enormous strength of the giant brother Bhima. Bhima and Hidimba have a son named Ghatotkacha.

=== Vaka-vadha (Baka-vadha) Parva (chapters: 159–166) ===
The life of Pandavas brothers in Ekachakra. Story about Bhima slaying another demon Bakasura, who has been terrorizing people of Ekachakra. Heroine of Mahabharata, Draupadi, is born in holy fire. Word spreads that the Pandavas may be alive.

=== Chaitraratha Parva (chapters: 167–185) ===
Pandavas set out for Panchala. Arjuna fights with a Gandharva. Stories of Tapati and the conflict between Vashistha and Vishwamitra. Stories of Kalmashapada, Parashara and Aurva. Dehumanization and persecution of Bhargava race of men.

=== Swayamvara Parva (chapters: 186–194) ===
The Pandavas arrive in Panchala. Draupadi's swayamvara. The Pandavas arrive at the swayamvara in disguise of Brahmanas. Arjuna excels in the swayamvara and wins Draupadi's heart and hand. Krishna recognizes the individuals in disguise as the Pandava brothers. The suitors object the marriage of Draupadi and Arjuna, a fight ensues. Bhima and Arjuna defeat all the suitors and then takes Draupadi to their cottage. Kunti thinking Draupadi as alms commands her to be shared by the five brothers. Dhrishtadyumna gets to know the true identity of Pandavas.

=== Vaivahika Parva (chapters: 195–201) ===
Drupada is delighted at discovering that the Pandavas are alive. The Pandavas come to Drupada's palace. The story of Draupadi's previous lives and Indra punished by Shiva. The marriage of Draupadi with the Pandavas.

=== Viduragamana Parva (chapters: 202–209) ===
Vidura's attempt to reconcile the evil Kaurava brothers and the good Pandava brothers. Various speeches by Karna, Bhishma, Drona and Vidura. Pandavas return to Hastinapur with the blessings of Krishna. The construction of the city Indraprastha.

=== Rajya-labha Parva (chapters: 210–214) ===
Story of Sunda and Upasunda and of Narada.

=== Arjuna-vanavasa Parva (chapters: 215–220) ===
Arjuna violates dharma. He accepts voluntary exile. Arjuna marries Ulupi and Chitrangada, and rescues Apsaras. Story highlights his special powers and competence. Arjuna and Krishna become close friends. Arjuna goes to Dwarka, lives with Krishna.

=== Subhadra-harana Parva (chapters: 221–222) ===
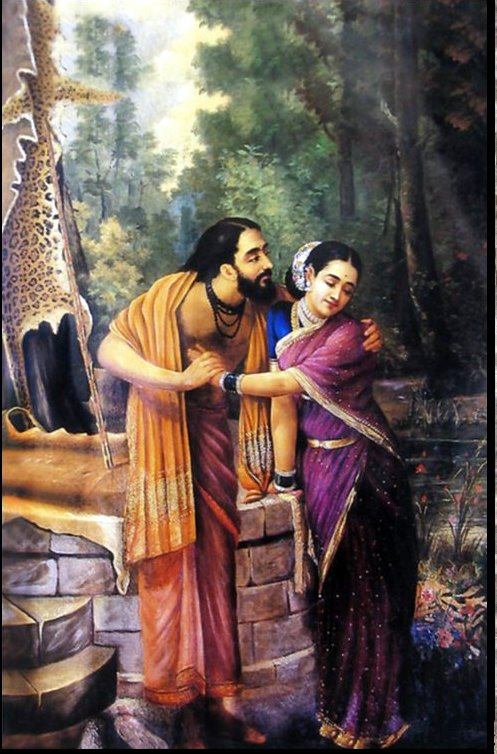
Arjuna and Subhadra

Arjuna falls in love with and takes away Subhadra, Krishna's sister. The upset Vrishnis prepare war with Arjuna, but finally desist.

=== Harana-harana (Harana-harika) Parva (chapter: 223) ===
Arjuna returns from exile, with Subhadra. They marry. Their son Abhimanyu is born. Story of the Draupadeyas, the five sons of Draupadi.

=== Khandava-Daha Parva (chapters: 224–236) ===
The reign of Yudhishthira. Krishna and Arjuna go to the banks of Yamuna, where they meet Agni, disguised as a Brahmin, who demands to consume the Khandava forest, to cure his digestive ailment. Stories of Swetaki, and Agni. Agni gives Arjuna the Gandiva bow and the ape-bannered chariot, while Krishna receives the discus. Agni starts consuming the forest when Indra and other deities obstruct. The fight of Krishna and Arjuna with celestials, their combined abilities, and their victory. Story of Aswasena (Son of Takshaka), Mandapala and his four bird sons. Maya rescued by Arjuna.

== English translations ==
Adi Parva and other books of Mahabharata are written in Sanskrit. Several translations of the Adi Parva are available in English. Translations whose copyrights have expired and are in the public domain include those by Kisari Mohan Ganguli and Manmatha Nath Dutt.

The translations are not consistent in parts and vary with each translator's interpretations. For example:

ययातीक्ष्वाकुवंशश्च राजर्षीणां च सर्शः|
सम्भूता बहवो वंशा भूतसर्गाः सविस्तराः||४५||
भूतस्थानानि सर्वाणि रहस्यं त्रिविधं च यत्|
वेदयोगं सविज्ञानं धर्मोऽर्थः काम एव च||४६||
धर्मकामार्थशास्त्राणि शास्त्राणि विविधानि च|
लोकयात्राविधानं च सम्भूतं दृष्टवानृषिः||४७||
इतिहासाः सवैयाख्या विविधाः श्रुतयोऽपि च|
इह सर्वमनुक्रान्तमुक्तं ग्रन्थस्य लक्षणम्||४८||विस्तीर्यैतन्महज्ज्ञानमृषिः सङ्क्षेपमब्रवीत्|
इष्टं हि विदुषां लोके समासव्यासधारणम्||४९||
मन्वादि भारतं केचिदास्तीकादि तथापरे|
तथोपरिचराद्यन्ये विप्राः सम्यगधीयते||५०||
विविधं संहिताज्ञानं दीपयन्ति मनीषिणः|
व्याख्यातुं कुशलाः केचिद्ग्रन्थं धारयितुं परे||५१||
तपसा ब्रह्मचर्येण व्यस्य वेदं सनातनम्|
इतिहासमिमं चक्रे पुण्यं सत्यवतीसुतः||५२||

— Anukramanika Parva, Adi Parva, Mahabharata Book i.1

Translation by Manmatha Nath Dutt:

The wisdom of this work, like the stick used for applying collyrium,
has opened the eyes of the world which were covered by the darkness of ignorance.
As the sun drives away the darkness, so does this Bharata,
by its discourses on Dharma, Artha, Kama and Moksha, drive the ignorance of men.
As the full moon with its mild light opens the buds of the water-lily,
so does this with the light of Sruti expand the human intellect.
The whole house of the womb of nature is properly and completely lighted by the lamp of history which destroys the darkness of ignorance.
This work is a tree, the chapter of contents is its seed, the divisions Paulama and Astika are its roots, the Sambhava is its trunk,
the books (Parva) Sava and Aranya are the roosting perches, Arani is the knitting knot.
Virata and Udyoga the pith, Bhishma the main branch, Drona the leaves, Karna its beautiful flowers,
Sailya their fragrance, Stri and Aishika are its cooling shades, Shanti its great fruit.
Ashwamedha is its immortal sap, Asramavasika the place where it grows, and Mausula is the epitome of the Vedas.
This tree will be highly respected by all virtuous Brahmans. This tree of Bharata will be as inexhaustible as the clouds and be the means of livelihood of many illustrious poets.
Sauti continued: I shall speak to you about the ever lasting, fruitful and flowery productions of this tree. They are of pleasant and pure taste, and they are to be tasted even by immortals.

— Anukramanika Parva, Translated by Manmatha Nath Dutt, Adi Parva, Mahabharata Book i.1

Translation by Kisari Mohan Ganguli:

The wisdom of this work, like unto an instrument of applying collyrium, hath opened the eyes of the inquisitive world blinded by the darkness of ignorance. As the sun dispelleth the darkness, so doth the Bharata by its discourses on religion, profit, pleasure and final release, dispel the ignorance of men. As the full-moon by its mild light expandeth the buds of the water-lily, so this Purana, by exposing the light of the Sruti hath expanded the human intellect. By the lamp of history, which destroyeth the darkness of ignorance, the whole mansion of nature is properly and completely illuminated.

This work is a tree, of which the chapter of contents is the seed; the divisions called Pauloma and Astika are the root; the part called Sambhava is the trunk; the books called Sabha and Aranya are the roosting perches; the books called Arani is the knitting knots; the books called Virata and Udyoga the pith; the book named Bhishma, the main branch; the book called Drona, the leaves; the book called Karna, the fair flowers; the book named Salya, their sweet smell; the books entitled Stri and Aishika, the refreshing shade; the book called Santi, the mighty fruit; the book called Aswamedha, the immortal sap; the denominated Asramavasika, the spot where it groweth; and the book called Mausala, is an epitome of the Vedas and held in great respect by the virtuous Brahmanas. The tree of the Bharata, inexhaustible to mankind as the clouds, shall be as a source of livelihood to all distinguished poets."

Sauti continued, "I will now speak of the undying flowery and fruitful productions of this tree, possessed of pure and pleasant taste and not to be destroyed even by the immortals."

— Anukramanika Parva, Translated by Kisari Mohan Ganguli, Adi Parva, Mahabharata Book i.1

The total number of original verses depend on which Sanskrit source is used, and these do not equal the totalnumber of translated verses in each chapter, in both Ganguli and Dutt translations. Mahabharata, like many ancient Sanskrit texts, was transmitted across generations verbally, a practice that was a source of corruption of its text, deletion of verses as well as the addition of extraneous verses over time. Some of these suspect verses have been identified by change in style and integrity of meter in the verses. The structure, prose, meter and style of translations vary within chapters between the translating authors.

Debroy, in his 2011 overview of Mahabharata, notes that updated critical edition of Adi Parva, with spurious and corrupted text removed, has 19 parts, 225 adhyayas (chapters) and 7,205 shlokas (verses).

== Quotations and teachings ==
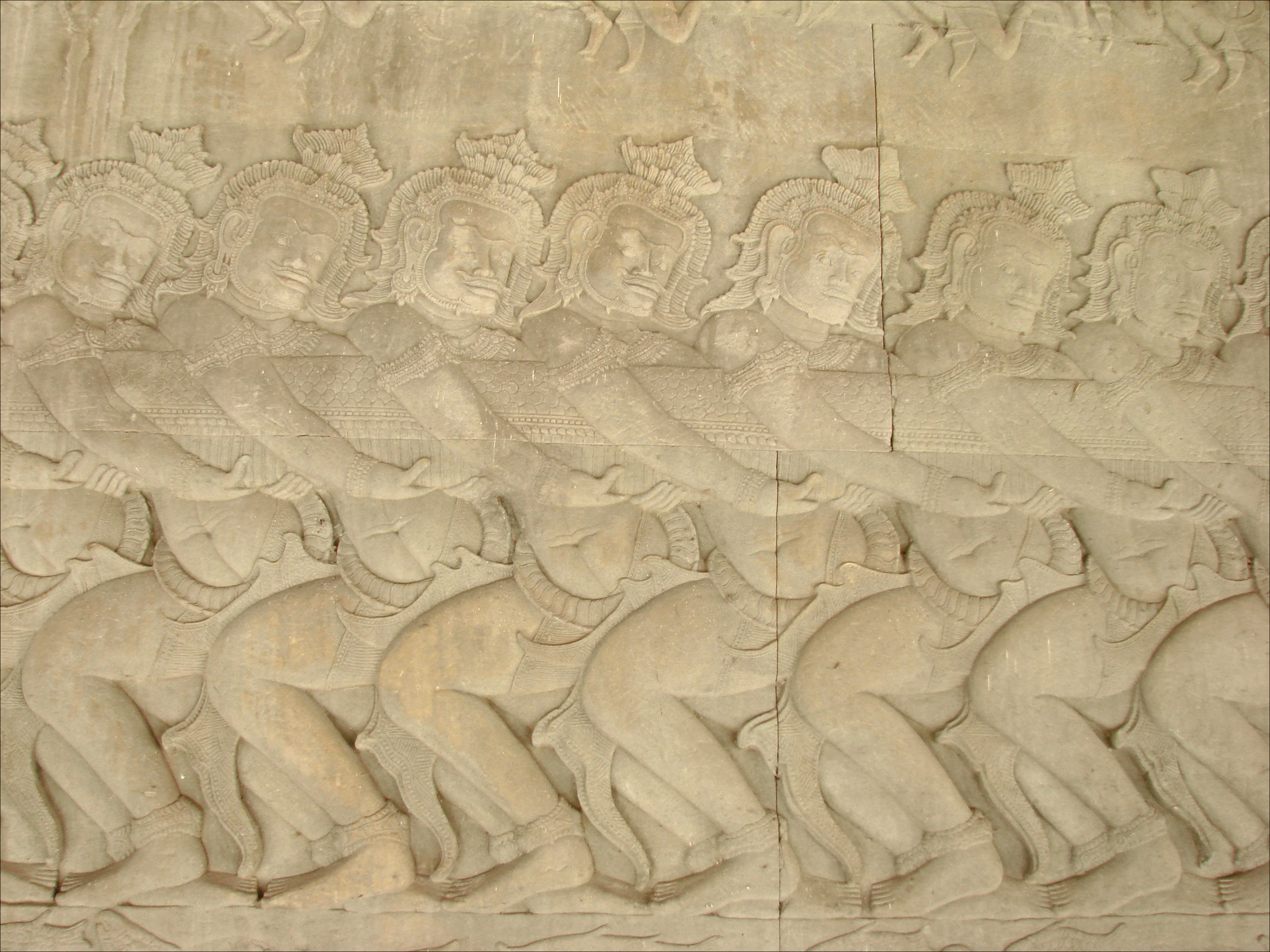
The creation of universe by the churning of the ocean - this story is told in many ancient Indian scripts, including the initial chapters of Adi Parva. Above picture is from the Mahabharata wall of Angkor Wat, Cambodia depicting the Samudra manthan story

Anukramanika Parva, Chapter 1:

Time creates all things
and time destroys them all.
Time burns all creatures
and time again extinguishes that fire.

— Anukramanika Parva, Adi Parva, Mahabharata Book i.1

Tapa is not a sin,
Study is not a sin,
Ordinances of Vedas are not sins,
Acquisition of wealth by exertion is not a sin,
When they are abused, then do they become the sources of evil.

— Anukramanika Parva, Adi Parva, Mahabharata Book i.1

Sangraha Parva, Chapter 2:

As all the senses are dependent on the wonderful workings of the mind,
so all the acts and moral qualities depend on this treatise(Mahabharata).

— Sangraha Parva, Adi Parva, Mahabharata Book i 2

Paushya Parva, Chapter 3:

You are the infinite, you are the course of Nature and intelligent soul that pervades all,
I desire to obtain you through knowledge, derived from hearing and meditation.

— Paushya Parva, Adi Parva, Mahabharata Book i.3

Adivansabatarana Parva, Chapter 62:

This (Mahabharata) is equal to the Vedas, it is holy and excellent,
it is the worthiest of all that should be listened to. It is a Purana, adored by the Rishis,
It contains many useful instructions on Artha and Kama. This sacred history makes the heart desire to attain salvation.

— Adivansabatarana Parva, Adi Parva, Mahabharata Book i.62

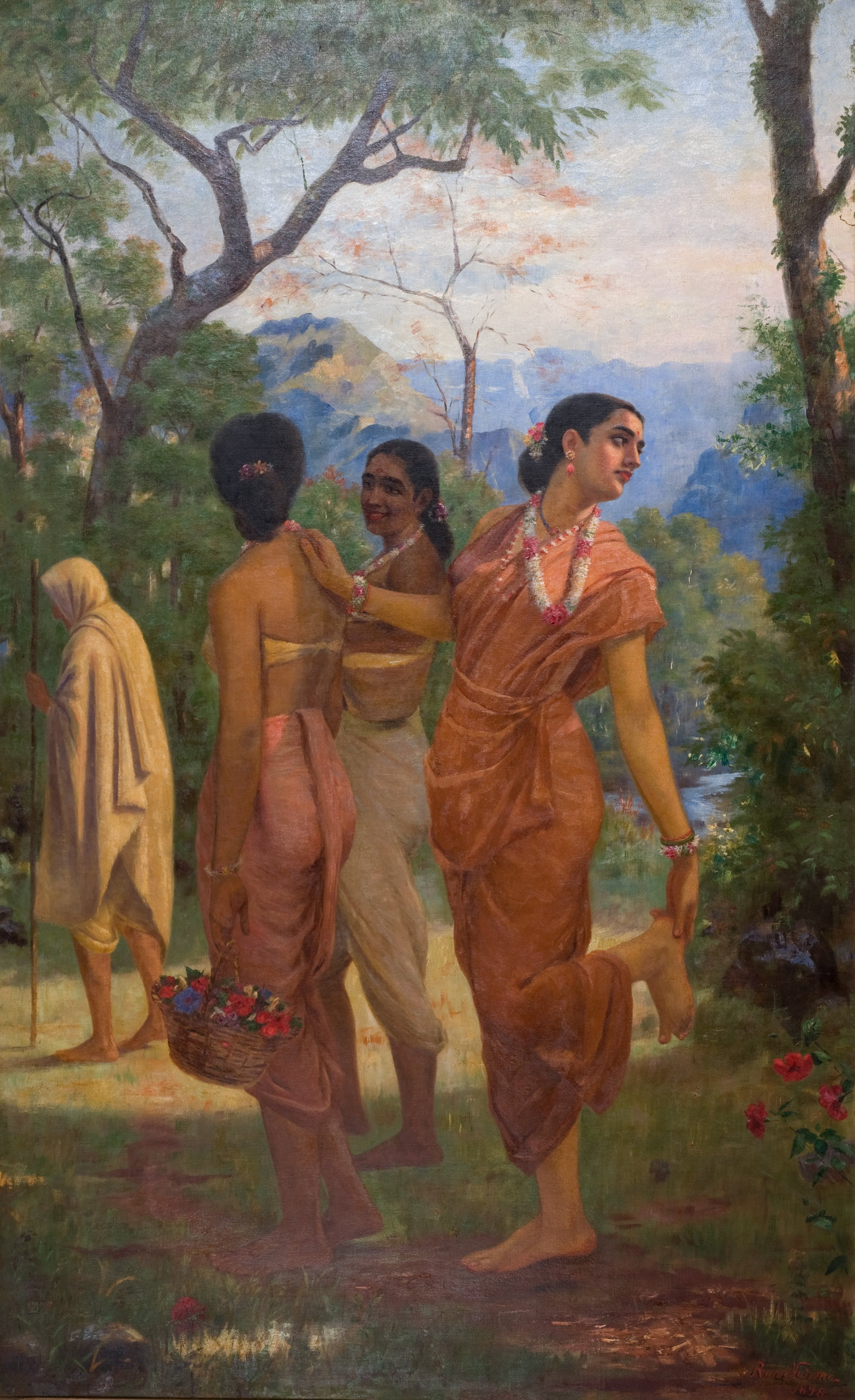
The life of Sakuntala with friends are described in chapters of Sambhava Parva in Adi Parva.

Sambhava Parva, Chapter 73:

Dushyanta said to Sakuntala: Marry me according to the Gandharva form, for this form of marriage is said to be the best.
Sakuntala: O king, my father has gone from the hermitage to collect fruits. Kindly wait for a moment. He will bestow me upon you.
Dushyanta: O beautiful lady, O faultless beauty, I desire you yourself should accept me,
Know that I exist for you. Know also, my heart is completely in you,
One is certainly one's own friend, one can certainly depend on one's own self,
Therefore, according to the ordinance(scriptures), you yourself should bestow your own self on others.

— Sambhava Parva, Adi Parva, Mahabharata Book i.73

Sambhava Parva, Chapter 74:

No man, even in anger, should ever do anything that is disagreeable to his wife;
for happiness, joy, virtue and everything depend on the wife.
Wife is the sacred soil in which the husband is born again,
even the Rishis cannot create men without women.
What is a greater happiness to a father than what the father feels when his son,
running to him, clasps him with his tiny little arms, though his body is full of dust and dirt.

— Sambhava Parva, Adi Parva, Mahabharata Book i.74

Sambhava Parva, Chapter 79:

He who subdues his anger, he who does not regard the bad word of others,
he who is not angry even when there is a cause, certainly acquires the four objects for which we live(namely Dharma, Artha, Kama and Moksha).
Between the two men, one performing sacrifices continually every month for one hundred years and one who does not feel any anger,
the man who does not feel any anger is the greater man.
Boys and girls, who are incapable of distinguishing between right and wrong,
quarrel among one another; the wise never imitate them.

— Sambhava Parva, Adi Parva, Mahabharata Book i.79

Sambhava Parva, Chapter 133:

Drupada said to Drona: Friendship never remains in the world in anyone's heart without being worn out,
Time wears it out, anger destroys it.
The poor cannot be the friend of the rich, the unlearned cannot be the friend of the learned,
the coward cannot be the friend of the brave, how then do you desire the continuance of our old friendship?

— Sambhava Parva, Adi Parva, Mahabharata Book i.133

Viduragamana Parva, Chapter 206:

Drona said to Dhritarashtra: Friends summoned for consultation should always speak what is right, true.

— Viduragamana Parva, Adi Parva, Mahabharata Book i.206

== See also ==
- Next book of Mahabharata: Sabha Parva
