= Nagaraja =

Serpent-kings in Hindu mythology

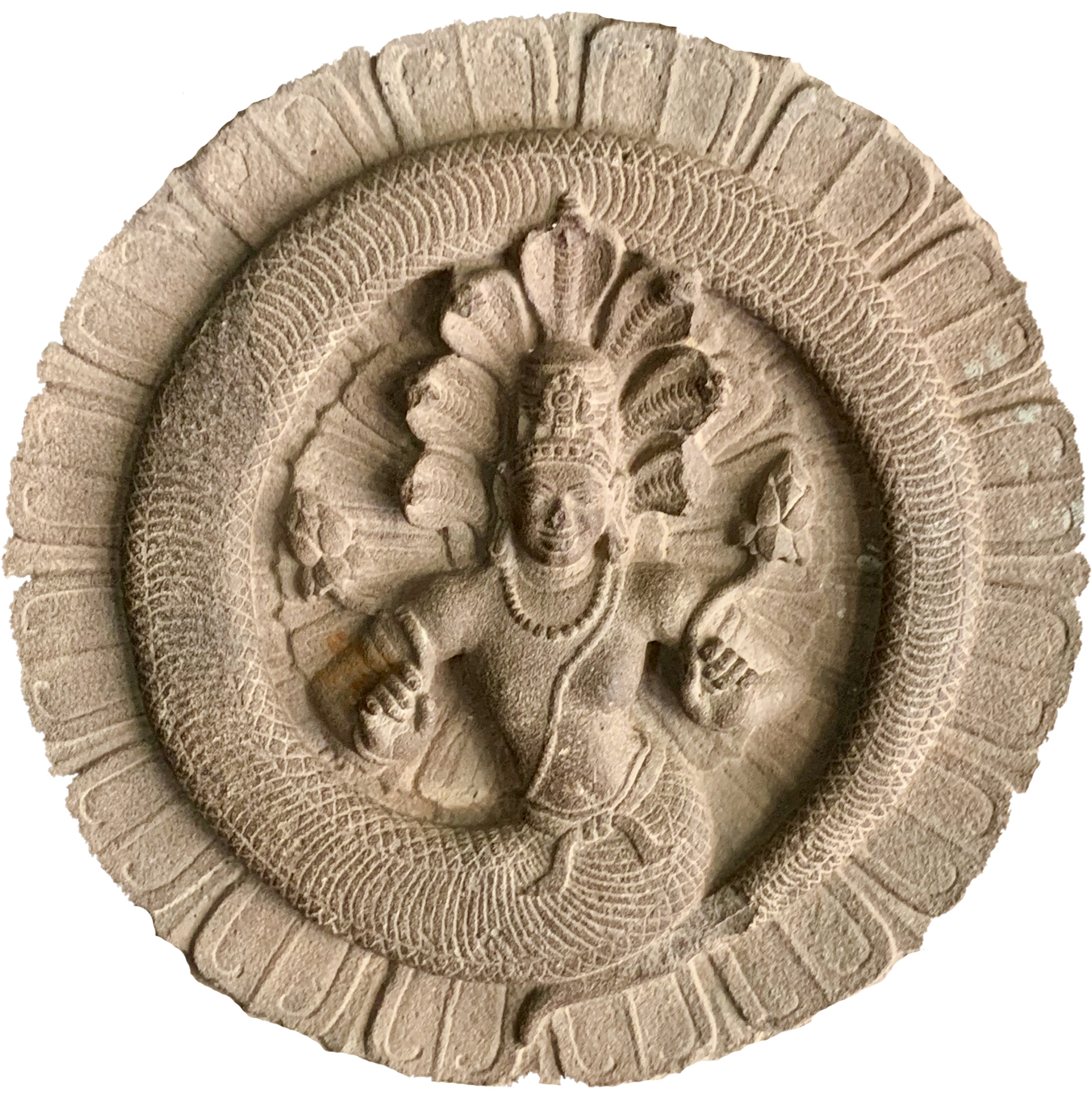
- 8th-century Nagaraja carving, Alampur, Telangana
- Devanagari: नागराज
- Sanskrit transliteration: Nāgarāja
- Wylie transliteration: Klu'i rgyal po
- Affiliation: Nāga
- Abode: Patala

A Nagaraja (Sanskrit: नागराज nāgarāja, lit. 'king of the nagas') is a king of the various races of the nāga, the divine or semi-divine, half-human, half-serpent beings that reside in the netherworld (Patala), and can occasionally take human form. Rituals devoted to these supernatural beings have been taking place throughout South Asia for at least two thousand years.

== Hinduism ==
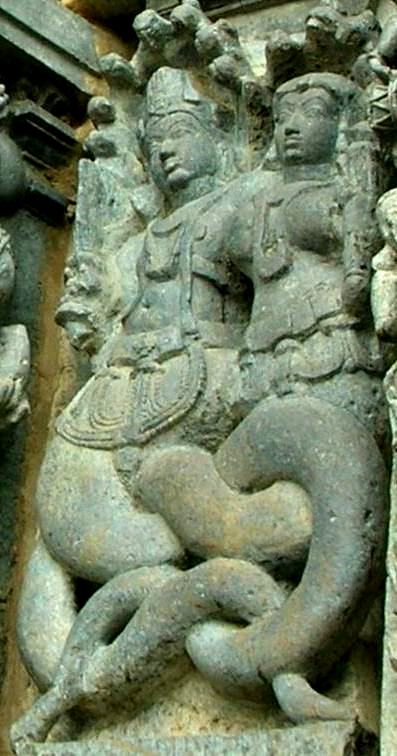
A statue of Nagaraja

Hindu texts refer to three main beings by this title: Shesha, Takshaka, and Vasuki. All of them are the children of the rishi Kashyapa and Kadru.

=== Shesha ===
Shesha, also sometimes known as Ananta, is the eldest brother, and the first serpent king of all serpents. A devotee and a mount of Vishnu, he serves as the deity's bed and is named as the noblest of all nagas. He is the being that supports the earth, on the behest of the creator god, Brahma, obtaining the boon to stand ever firmly on the concept of dharma.

=== Vasuki ===
Vasuki is the second serpent king in Indian religions. He is a devotee of Shiva, who always wears the nāga around his neck.

=== Takshaka ===
Takshaka is the third, and the present serpent king. In the Mahabharata, he ruled the Khandava forest, which was then burnt by the Pandava Arjuna. Later, Takshaka slew Parikshit, the grandson of Arjuna.

These serpents are a group of a thousand brothers, and they also have a sister, whose name is Manasa.

== Temples ==
A temple of the Nagaraja Vasuki is present in Gujarat's district of Thangadh.

At Nagercoil, in Kanyakumari district's of Tamil Nadu, a temple dedicated to Nagaraja exists.

There is another famous temple named Mannarasala in Alleppey district of Kerala. The deity in this temple embodies both Anantha and Vasuki into one. A temple devoted to nagraja exists in kaippattoor of Ernakulam district in Kerala, India. It is known as thekkanattil nagaraja kshetram.

A temple devoted to Nagaraja exists in Poojappura of the Thiruvananthapuram District in Kerala, India. It is known as the Poojappura Nagarukavu Temple. The uniqueness of this temple is that here the family of the Nagaraja, including Nagaramma (queen of nagas), and Nagakanya (princess of the naga kingdom) are placed inside a single temple.

Thiruvananthapuram also houses the Thuppanathu Kavu, located at Vazhamuttam. The three serpent deities evoked in this ancient temple are the Nagaraja Vasuki, the naga yakshi (serpent nature spirit), and the naga kanyaka (serpent damsel). Turmeric powder, noorum palum (Lime and Milk), and nagaroottu are offered to them. Accompanied by the naga deities and Goddesses at Thuppanathu Kavu are the goddess Vanadurga and the goddess Rajarajeswari.

Kukke Subramanya is a Hindu temple located in the village of Subramanya, Karnataka. In this temple Kartikeya is worshipped as Subramanya, the lord of all serpents. The epics relate that the divine serpent Vasuki and other serpents found refuge under Subramanya when threatened by Garuda.

== Buddhism ==
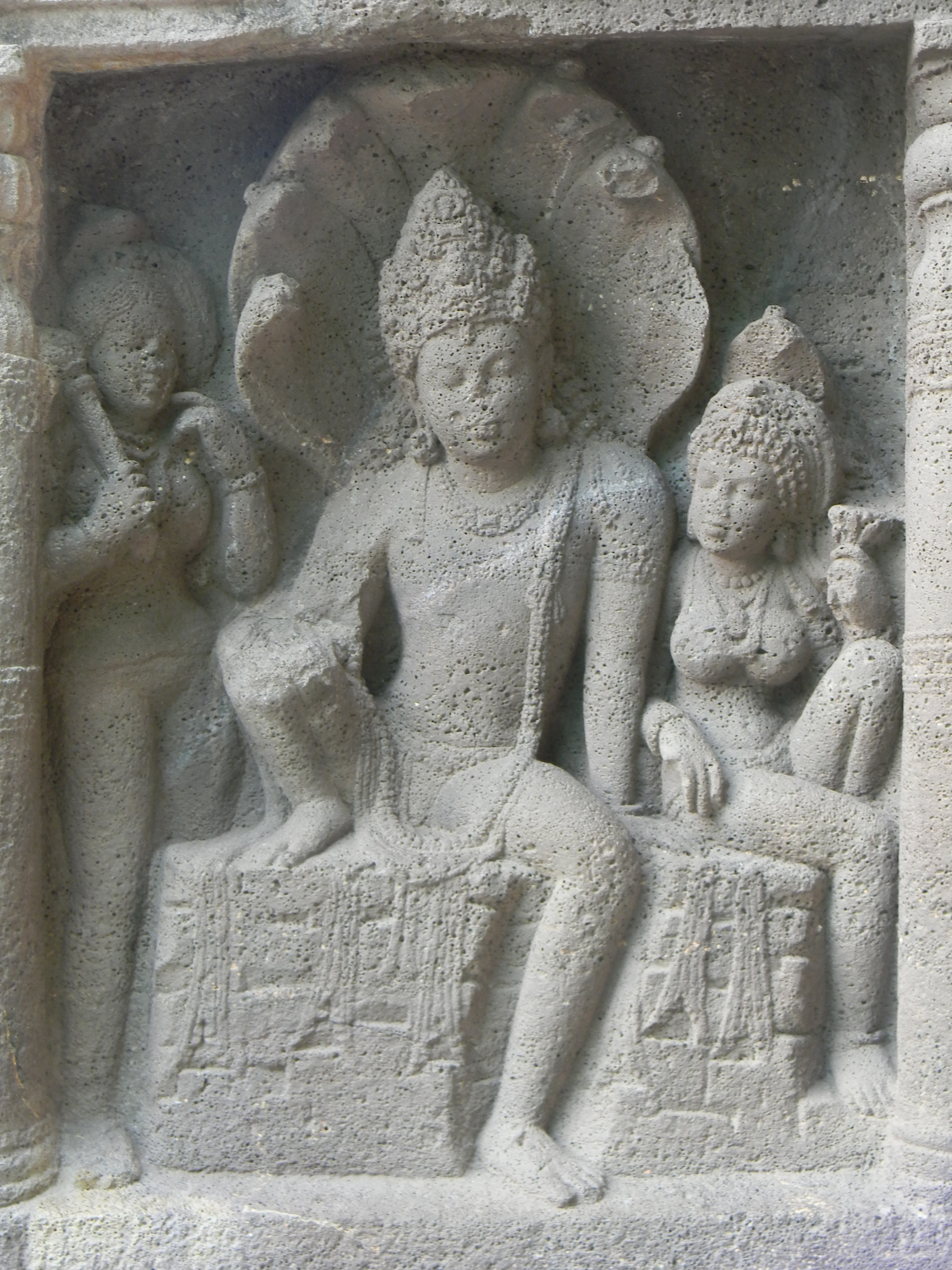
A Nagaraja with his wife in Buddhist Ajanta Caves.

There are many Nagarajas mentioned throughout various Buddhist texts. There are four major royal races of Nagarajas in Buddhism as the Virupakkhas, the Erapathas, the Chabyaputtas and the Kanhagotamakas. Nāga Kings appears in the audience for many of Gautama Buddha's sermons in Buddhist scriptures. The duties of the Nāga Kings included leading the nagas in protecting the Buddha, other enlightened beings, as well as protecting the Buddha Sasana.

Some of the most notable Nagarajas occurring in Buddhist scriptures are Virupaksa, Mucalinda, Dhrtarastra, Takshaka, Vasuki, Nanda, Upananda, Sagara, Balavan, Anavatapta, Varuna and Utpala.

=== Virupaksa ===
Virūpākṣa (Sanskrit; Pali: Virūpakkha) is a major deity in Buddhism. He is one of the Four Heavenly Kings and a dharmapala. He lives on the western part of Sumeru. He is leader of the nāgas.

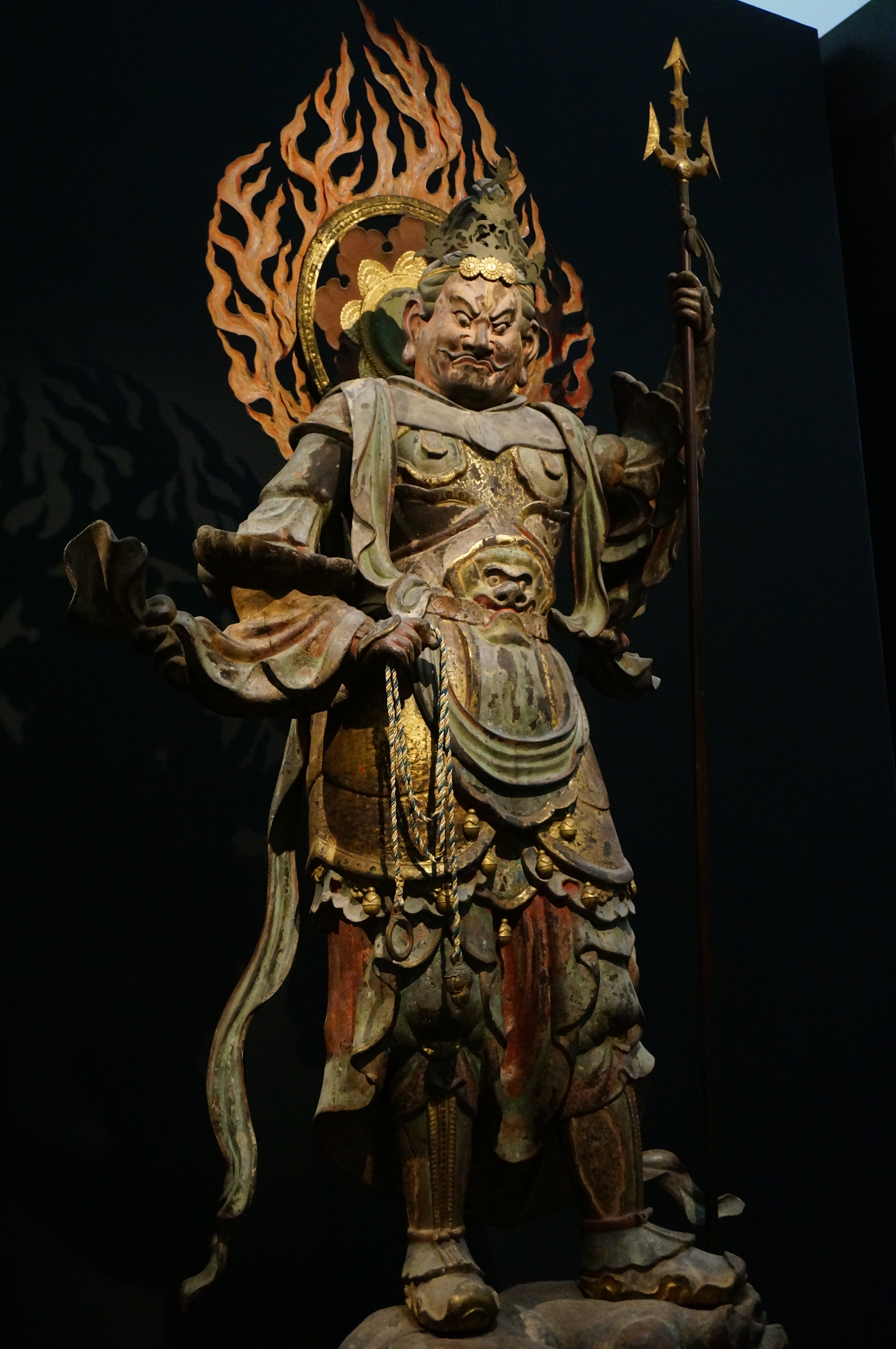
Statue of Kōmokuten (Virūpākṣa). Jōruri-ji, Japan.

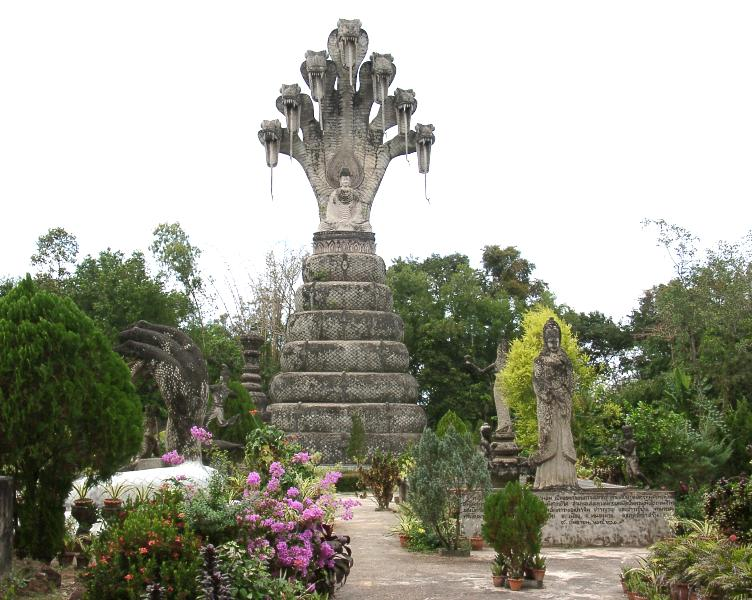
A statue of Mucalinda sheltering Gautama Buddha (naga Prok attitude). Sculpture in Nong Khai, Northeastern Thailand.

=== Mucalinda ===
It is said that four weeks after Gautama Buddha began meditating under the Bodhi Tree, the heavens darkened for seven days, and a prodigious rain descended. However, the mighty King of Serpents, Mucalinda, came from beneath the earth and protected with his hood the one who is the source of all protection. The subject of Buddha meditating under the protection of Mucalinda, also known as naga Prok attitude, is very common in Southeast Asian Buddhist art.

=== Dhrtarastra ===
Buddhist literature features a Nāga King named Dhṛtarāṣṭra(Sanskrit; Pali: Dhataraṭṭha). He was the father of Gautama Buddha in a past life when the latter was a bodhisattva named Bhūridatta. He is mentioned in several Buddhist texts such as the Bhūridatta Jātaka, the Mahamayuri Vidyarajni Sutra and the Mahāmegha Sūtra.

=== Apalala ===
Apalāla (Pali, Sanskrit) is a water-dwelling Nāga-king in Buddhist mythology. The story of conversion to Buddhism by the Buddha (Pali: Apalāladamana) can be found in Buddhist texts such as Samantapāsādikā and Divyāvadāna; this is one of the most popular legends in Buddhist lore and art.

=== Talasikhin ===
In some Buddhist traditions a figure called Duo-luo-shi-qi or Talasikhin is described as a Dragon King who dwells in a palace within a pond outside the legendary kingdom of Ketumati and drizzles in it during midnight.

== See also ==
- Long Wang (Dragon King)
- Kuzuryū
- Nagraj
- Ur (Mandaeism)
- Taxakeshwar – Nagaraja temple in Madhya Pradesh
- Naga Panchami – An auspicious day for naga Worship all over India
- Adishesha
- Vasuki
- Manasa
