= Sarpa Satra =

Sacrifice described in Hindu scriptures

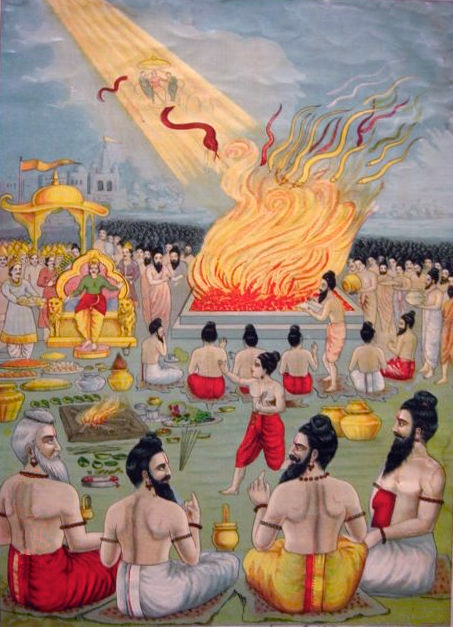
The snake sacrifice of Janamejaya, as Astika tries to stop it.

According to legend, Sarpa Satra or Snake sacrifice was a yagna performed by King Janamejaya of the Kuru kingdom who had ascended to the throne of Hastinapura upon the death of his father Parikshit. The legend states that Parikshit, the lone descendant of the House of Pandu, son of Abhimanyu and grand son of Arjuna of the Mahabharata fame, had died of snakebite. He had been cursed by a sage to die so, the curse having been consummated by the serpent-chieftain Takshaka. Janamejaya bore a deep grudge against the serpents for this act, and thus decided to wipe them out altogether. He attempted this by performing a great Sarpa Satra – a sacrifice that would destroy all living serpents. At that time, a learned sage named Astika, a boy in age, came and intervened to stop the yagna; Astika's mother manasa was a Naga and father was Jaratkaru a saintly Brahmin. Janamejaya had to listen to the words of the learned Astika and set Takshaka free. He also stopped the massacre of the snakes (Nagas) and ended all the enmity with them. From then onward the snakes (Nagas) and Kurus lived in peace.

== Background ==
The earliest background to this revengeful act of the snake sacrifice or Sarpa satra to kill snakes is traced to Arjuna, grandfather of Parikshit and great grandfather of Janamejaya. He had caused the death of the wife of the snake chieftain Takshaka and millions of other snakes by setting the forests of Khandava on fire to establish the kingdom of the Pandavas at Indraprastha.

According to the Mahabharata legend, snakes were cursed by their mother Kadru when they refused to obey her request to cheat by turning the tail of the white horse Uchchaihshravas to a black colour to win a bet against her sister and cowife Vinata. Then her sons led by Vasuki held deliberations on the way to stop the snake sacrifice or Sarpa Satra yagna that may be initiated by Janamejaya to kill the race. Takshaka was also one of Kadru's sons who had opposed his mother's request. He had been thrown out of the house by his mother. He then moved out to form his own band of snakes.

Elapatra who was one of the son of Kadru listening to the discussions held by the snakes and the comments made by Vasuki told them that nobody could prevent the sacrifice from being held by Janamejaya as it was ordained by gods to eliminate the evil snakes which had multiplied in number, and by their unchecked biting and killing of people were the cause of misery to people in the world. But the noble snakes would, however, be saved by the intervention of sage Jaratkaru's son Astika. He also told the snake king Vasuki and others that that was the reason for the gods not interfering when Kadru cursed her sons to be destroyed in the Sarpa Satra yagna. Elapatra also informed that Brahma had willed that Jaratkaru, the noble and learned saint would marry the sister of Vasuki whose name was also Jaratkaru and the son born to them, who would be known as Astika, would stop the Sarapa Satra yagna. Vasuki and the other snakes, there after paid close attention to the movements of the sage Jaratkaru who was roaming in the forests. They were advised to note any utterance of the saint seeking a bride for himself to marry.

As the sage Jaratkaru was busy with his ascetic penances, Parikshit, the king of the Kuru Dynasty who was on a hunting spree in the forests, was thirsty and came across sage Samika sitting in deep penance. Parikshit asked him for water but the sage did not respond as he was in deep meditation. But the king was annoyed and he killed a snake with a stick and in a rage put the dead snake around the neck of the sage. The sage did not show any emotion nor did he curse the king. Parikshit seeing the sage in that state repented for his act and returned to his kingdom. Then the sage's son Sringin, who saw a dead snake around his father's neck, was deeply disturbed and raged against his colleague, Krisa, for taking it as a joke.

Krisa informed his friend that Parikshit, the son of Abhimanyu, who was on a hunting expedition in the forest had perpetrated this act. Hearing this Sringin cursed that Parikshit would die of snake bite inflicted by the chief of snakes, Takshaka, within seven nights. He then informed his ascetic father of the curse that he had given to Parikshit. The sage, Samika, was displeased with the curse and told his son Sringin that it was improper to curse a noble king who was the protector of all, particularly when the king had acted out of impulse as he was thirsty and was seeking water from him. But his son stood by his curse. However, sage Samika sent one of his disciples, Gaurmukha, to inform the king Parikhsit of the curse of his son, though he himself was opposed to it. Parikhsit became repentant for his act of hurting the sentiments of a noble sage but was not disturbed to hear about his death by snakebite. The king then took all protective action to save himself of any snake bite and in consultation with his ministers securely confined himself. On the seventh day, when the chief of snakes Takshaka was going towards Hastinapur to kill Parikshit, the learned sage Kashyapa who had heard the story of the curse on the king was also on his way to save the king of the snakebite. Takshaka met him on the way and told him that nothing could prevent him in killing the king and that no body could even save him. He then challenged Kashyapa by totally burning a banyan tree to ashes with his poison and asking the sage to revive it. Kashyapa revived the tree and Takshaka realised that Kashyapa could be lured by riches of gold and other gifts. Kashyapa by his deep thoughts also perceived that Parikshit's life span had come to an end and that he would not live further. He then accepted the gifts offered by Takshaka and went away. Then Takshaka went to Hastinapur in the disguise of a Brahmin and realising that the king was protected by spells, decided to approach the king by deceit. He sent an emissary with a plate of fruits, Kusa grass and water to be offered to the king which was accepted by the king. As the evening sun had set on the seventh day, the king decided to eat the fruit thinking that his hour of death was stalled. He found an insect in the fruit and picked it up and placed it on his neck saying that if it was Takshaka the snake let it bite him. It was truly Takshaka in the disguise of an insect who then appeared in his true form, coiled himself around the neck of the king, bit the king and killed him.

The last rites of the king were performed by a Brahmin priest as the King's son was a minor. The minor son was appointed the king and given the name Janamejaya meaning "the slayer of all enemies." Janamejaya ruled the Kuru empire of his great grandfather Yudhisthira. He ruled the kingdom wisely and heroically like a monarch. He married Vapushtama, the daughter of king of Varanasi (Kashi).

During this period, Jaratkaru who was roaming around the forest met a group of manes, who were his ancestors and who were hanging upside down waiting for salvation to go to heaven. They informed Jaratkaru that their only descendant was Jaratkaru and if he gets married and begets a son then only they would be relieved of their present state and then go heaven. Jaratkaru revealed his identity to the manes and requested them to tell him the way he could help them. They then told him to get married and beget a son. He promised to act on their advice and then roamed around the forest seeking a bride. He addressed the forest space, nobody in particular, to find a father who could offer his daughter whom he could marry. Vasuki, who was waiting to hear such an utterance from Jaratkaru, was informed of the pleading of Jaratkaru. Vasuki then came forward and offered his sister named Manasa (also called by the name Jaratkaru in some texts) to Jaratkaru to marry. Vasuki also promised the sage that he would maintain his sister for all time as he had brought her up only to marry him. Hearing this Jaratkaru agreed to marry Vasuki's sister and moved to stay in the house of Vasuki, where he was provided with suitable accommodation to live with his wife. He took a promise from his wife that she would do nothing which will hurt him or upset his daily chores and in case she does not follow his injunctions he would then desert her. On one particular day, when he was tired, he slept on his wife's lap. As he was sleeping soundly she did not wake him up for his evening prayers. As the sun was about to set his wife Jaratkaru, preferring to invite his wrath than prevent him from performing his religious rites, whispered to her husband and woke him up and told him to perform his evening's religious rites as the twilight was setting on the west. The sage arose and became very furious for not waking him up in time and told his wife that the time had now come for him to leave her. She then pleaded with the sage to bestow her with a child as she was married to him by her relatives only for this purpose, to overcome the curse of their mother Kadru. He then made her conceive and told her that the son who would be born would be 'highly virtuous, and a master of the Vedas and their branches'. He then left her and retired to the forest to do penance.

Vasuki, who was informed by his sister of what had transpired with her husband, told her that it would be better to await the birth of her child who will benefit their race than go in pursuit of her husband and invite his wrath. Soon a son was born to her under the care of her brother and other snake relatives, whom they named Astika, meaning "whoever is" as his father Jaratkaru had uttered "There is" when he was in his mother's womb. Astika, right from the young age, showed celestial features. He was brought up in the house of Vasuki, his uncle. He became proficient in Vedic scriptures, and was taught by sage Chyavana, son of Maharishi Bhrigu. He was rigid in his habits without any indulgences and was saintly.

== Snake sacrifice ==
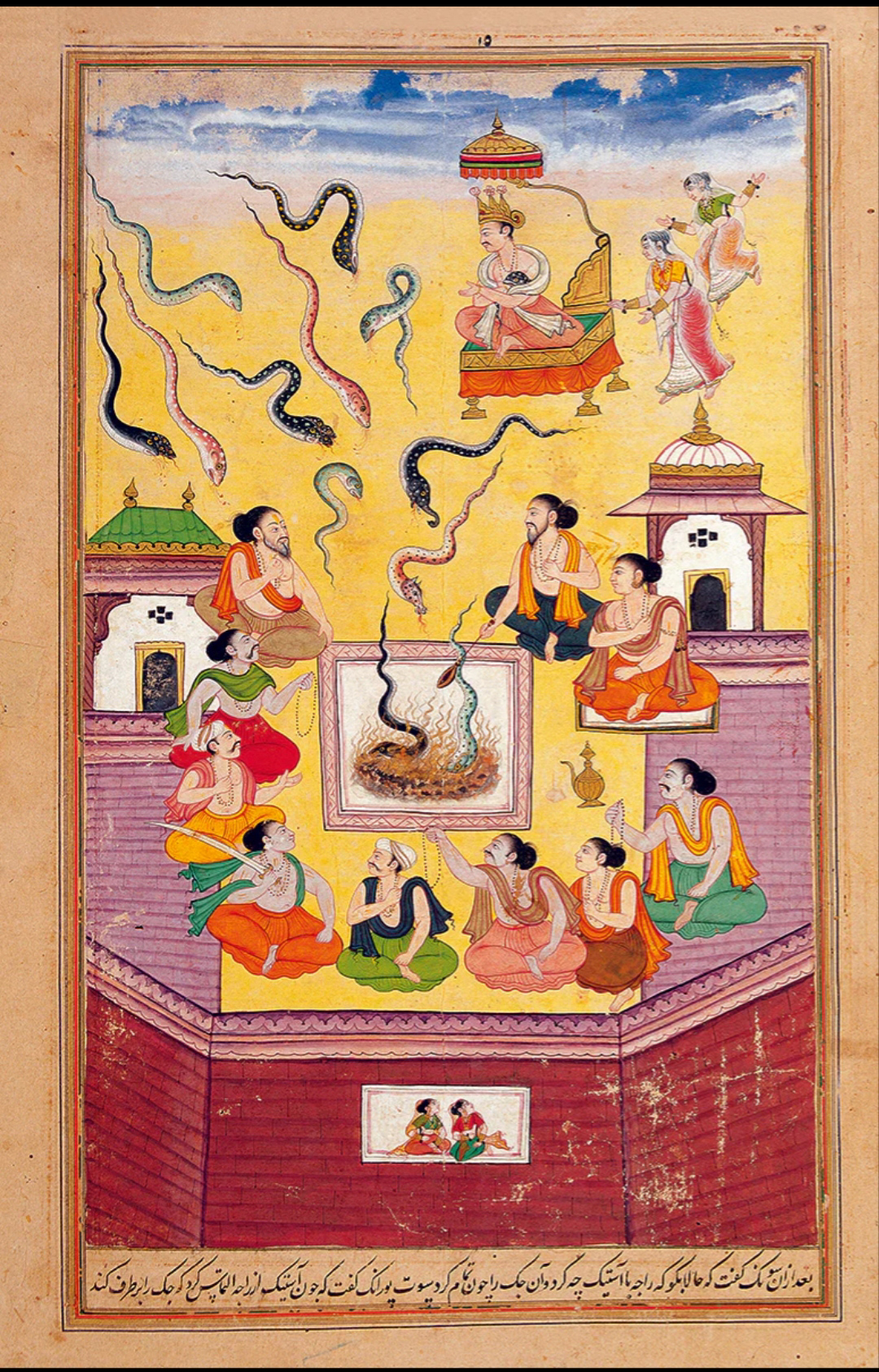
Sarpayaga from Razmnama

When King Janamejaya wanted to know the reasons for his father Parikshit's death, details were made known by his council of Ministers. Uttanka, one of the priests in the court of Janamejaya, who had also been cheated by Takshaka, gave a detailed account of Parikshit's death and urged Janamejaya to take revenge by holding the snake sacrifice. Knowing these details, Janamajaya was deeply disturbed and vowed to avenge the death of his father. Janamejaya then decided to perform the snake sacrifice to destroy not only Takshaka, his enemy who had killed his father, but the entire race of snakes. The Ritwiks told him that such a sacrifice also finds mention in Puranic literature.

Then preparations were made to hold the snake sacrifice and a land was chosen for this purpose. A special platform was constructed at the site as per Vedic injunctions in consultation with the learned Brahmanas. However, there was one disturbing comment made by the builder of the platform, a suta, who said that the site chosen was not suitable and that the sacrifice would be left incomplete. Janamajeya, disturbed by this prediction, set up a strong security around the sacred platform and posted guards to prevent any outsiders from entering the premises of the yagna.

As the snake sacrifice was begun by pouring clarified butter into the fire, in the presence of Janamejaya, by the Rithwicks, great saints and priests chanting appropriate hymns, snakes of all sizes and shapes started falling into the agni (fire). Takshaka, the main snake intended to be killed by the sacrifice, became scared and took shelter under Indra who promised to protect him, and told Takshaka not to be fearful. However, Vasuki, the king of snakes was perturbed by the development noting that his family of snakes was getting depleted drastically, leaving only a few, and also feared that he himself could be drawn into the fire. He then went in appeal to his sister Jaratkaru seeking the help of her son Astika who was born to help stop the sacrifice.

As Astika wanted to know the background to the issue, his mother narrated to him from the time of the curse of Kadru, her marriage to Jaratkaru and that the son born to her would relieve them of the curse of Kadru. Vasuki also appealed to his nephew to save the race of the snakes. Astika then promised that he would help to stop the snake sacrifice and then proceeded towards the place where the fire sacrifice was being held. He persuaded the gate keepers to allow him to enter the premises of the yagna where the king Janamejaya, the Ritwiks, and the Sadasyas were engaged in the grand snake sacrifice.

On entering the place of the yagna platform Astika offered greetings to Janamejaya and extolled his virtues and achievements in glorious terms. He also extolled the Ritwiks and Sadasyas who were involved in performing the sacrifice. Janamejaya, who was pleased with the way the young Astika addressed him and the assembled sages and Ritwicks with his erudite knowledge, asked Astika to seek a boon which he would definitely honour since he was a Brahmin. The Sadasyas also recommended that the young boy should be respected by the king and bestowed with boons; but the boon should be given only after Takshaka, the enemy of the king was dragged into the fire.

The Ritwicks were asked to intensify their chanting and fire offerings to draw Takshaka to the fire. The Ritwicks told Janamajeya that Takshaka was given shelter by Indra and hence were unable to draw him to the fire. This was also confirmed by Astika. Janamejaya ordered that Indra be dragged into the fire along with Takshaka. And the Hotris (priests) intensified their hymnal chantings and libations (fire offerings). Indra was dragged toward the fire and Takshaka was hiding in Indra's upper garment. As soon as Indra saw the fire sacrifice he was frightened and fled from the scene leaving Takshaka in mid air getting dragged towards the fire.

In another version it is said that when only Indra appeared before them the Brahmins were furious and threatened Indra that he would be dragged into the sacrificial fire if he does not surrender Takshaka. But Indra drew his thunderbolt weapon to hurl at the Brahmins. As he drew the thunderbolt Takshaka who was hiding behind Indra was exposed. Fearing for his life Indra then fled from the scene of the yagna. When the Hotris performing the yagna saw Takshaka hanging just above the fire they told Janamejaya to grant the promised boon to Astika. Then urged by Janamejaya, Astika asked the king to stop the fire sacrifice and that no more snakes should perish in the fire. Janamejaya appealed to Astika that he would give him all riches of gold, and other things but he should allow the fire sacrifice to continue. Astika did not relent and the Sadasyas assembled asked Janamejaya to grant Astika, the boon. As the sacrifice continued the number of snakes that fell into the fire became countless, which were of all shapes and sizes and belonged to many races; Takshaka's children were all consumed to the fire.

As the fire sacrifice was in progress Takshsaka was held in mid air because Astika had said " 'Stay,' 'Stay,' 'Stay'" and his command was more powerful than the mantras uttered by the Hotris. The Sadasyas then repeatedly urged Janamejaya to stop the yagna. Finally, Janamejaya agreed to stop the sacrifice. Thus, Astika was successful in saving the life of Takshaka and the remaining serpent race. Janamejaya was extremely pleased with Astika and wished him well as he returned home. He told Astika to join him as a Sadasya and participate in the great Horse-sacrifice which he proposed to hold in the future.

Thus the "complete extermination" of the snake race (Nagas) started by Janamejaya came to an end with the timely intervention of Astika who brokered peace between the Kurus and the snakes (Nagas). The snakes which were saved celebrated the happy event, thanked Astika and asked him: "O learned one, what good shall we do unto thee? We have been very much gratified, having been all saved by thee. What shall we accomplish for thee, O child!" Astika told them that they should desist from causing harm to anyone during day or night. Any one narrating the story of Astika should have full immunity from snake bite and any snake disobeying this injunction shall have "his hood divided a hundredfold like the fruit of Sinsa tree". Janamejaya who felt happy with the outcome of the snake sacrifice rewarded the Ritwiks, the Sadasyas, Suta Lohitaksha who had predicted about the stoppage of the yagna, and also all those who participated in the yagna.

After the yagna was stopped Vaishampayana who was sitting beside Vedavyasa, the author of Mahabharata, started narrating the epic story of Mahabharata to Janamejaya, where Astika and other Brahmins had also assembled at the venue.

== In popular culture ==
- Glimpses Animations (a unit of Crazons Creative Studios) created a 70-minute long animated movie on the whole series of events.
