= Taxakeshwar Temple, Mandsaur =

Hindu temple

Taxakeshwar Temple, Mandsaur is a Hindu temple dedicated to Lord Taxak, in Mandsaur, Mandsaur District, Madhya Pradesh, India. The temple is around 22 km from Bhanpura, in Nawli village.

== Legend ==
It is believed that King Parikshit was bitten by Takshak as a result of a curse. He called Lord Dhanvantari for removal of poison. Takshak became worried that the medicinal effect would nullify the curse. Takshak changed into the form of wood and f4ll on the path of Dhanavantri. This made Dhanavantri itchy on the back and as she picked up the wood to rub, Takshak converted into a snake and bit her. Takshakeshwar Temple is situated where Takshak bit Dhanavantri.
