= Astika (sage) =

Sage in Hinduism

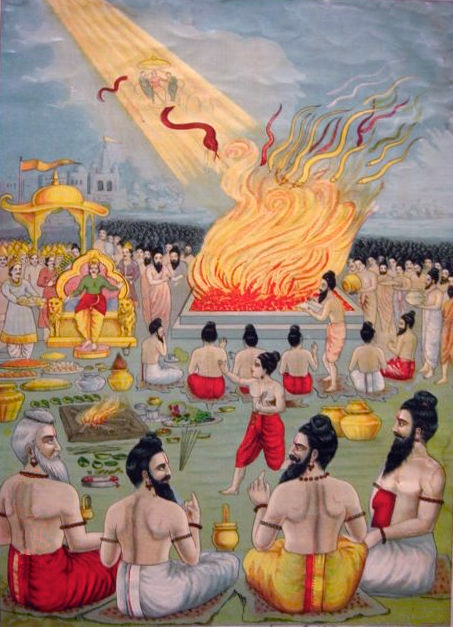
- The snake sacrifice of Janamejaya, as Astika (boy in red) stops the king

Information
- Family: Jaratkaru (father); Manasa (mother)

Astika (Sanskrit: आस्तीक, romanized: Āstīka) is a rishi (sage) featured in Hinduism. He is the son of Jaratkaru by the serpent goddess, Manasa.

== Legend ==
=== Birth ===
According to the Devi Bhagavata Purana, a sage named Jaratkaru was wandering a forest when he came across his Pitrs (spirits of his forefathers), hanging over a precipice of blades of grass. His forefathers explained to him that they suffered because Jaratkaru had no children, and was the last of his line. In a bid to save his Pitrs from their ordeal, Jaratkaru decided to marry a woman who shared his name. He visited the naga king Vasuki, and married his sister, Manasa, one of whose names was Jaratkaru. At the site of Pushkara, one evening, Jaratkaru slept upon the lap of his wife, and had not performed his prayers at dusk. Facing the dilemma of having to disturb the sleep of her husband so that he may perform his duty, she chose to rouse him. Furious, Jaratkaru decided to leave his wife for this act. When Manasa begged for his forgiveness, Jaratkaru informed her that she was pregnant with his child, and proclaimed that he would be brilliant and devoted. Thus, he was named Astika. Astika completed his education under Sage Chyavana, the son of Bhrigu. According to the Devi Bhagavata Purana, since his mother was a disciple of Shiva, Astika also became a disciple of the deity.

=== Snake sacrifice ===
According to the Mahabharata, Astika saved the life of the serpent Takshaka. This occurred when the king Janamejaya organised a snake sacrifice known as the Sarpa Satra, where he made great sacrifices of serpents, to avenge for the death of his father Parikshit, due to snakebite of Takshaka. Ultimately, he induced and prevailed upon the king to end his persecution of the serpent race. His father left him before his birth. In popular tradition, the day these serpents were saved is regarded to be the Shukla Paksha Panchami in the month of Shravana, and is celebrated as the festival of Naga Panchami.

== Bibliography ==
- Garg, Gaṅgā Rām (1992). Encyclopaedia of the Hindu World. Concept Publishing Company. ISBN 978-81-7022-376-4.
- Dictionary of Hindu Lore and Legend (ISBN 0-500-51088-1) by Anna L. Dallapiccola
