= Thuppanathu Kavu =

Hindu temple in Kerala, India

Thuppanathu Kavu is a Hindu temple dedicated to goddess Raja Rajeswary. It is located in Vazhamuttom, Kerala.

Raja Rajeswary is one of the most popular deities in the area. Pilgrims from all over South India visit and worship her. Her major festival is Patham Udhaya Pongala, which takes place in her temple during the month of Medam (April–May).
