= Dictionary of Hindu Lore and Legend =

2002 book by Anna L. Dallapiccola

The Dictionary of Hindu Lore and Legend (2002) is a book written by Anna L. Dallapiccola, and contains information on over one thousand concepts, characters, and places of Hindu mythology and Hinduism, one of the major religions of the Indian subcontinent. The writer has remained associated with the university of Heidelberg, Germany as a Professor of Indian Art; with the University of Edinburgh, Great Britain as Honorary Professor; and with De Montfort University, Leicester as a visiting professor. She is a Fellow of the Royal Asiatic Society.

== Sources ==
ISBN 0-500-51088-1
