= Vasuki =

Indian mythological serpent king

- Nagaraja
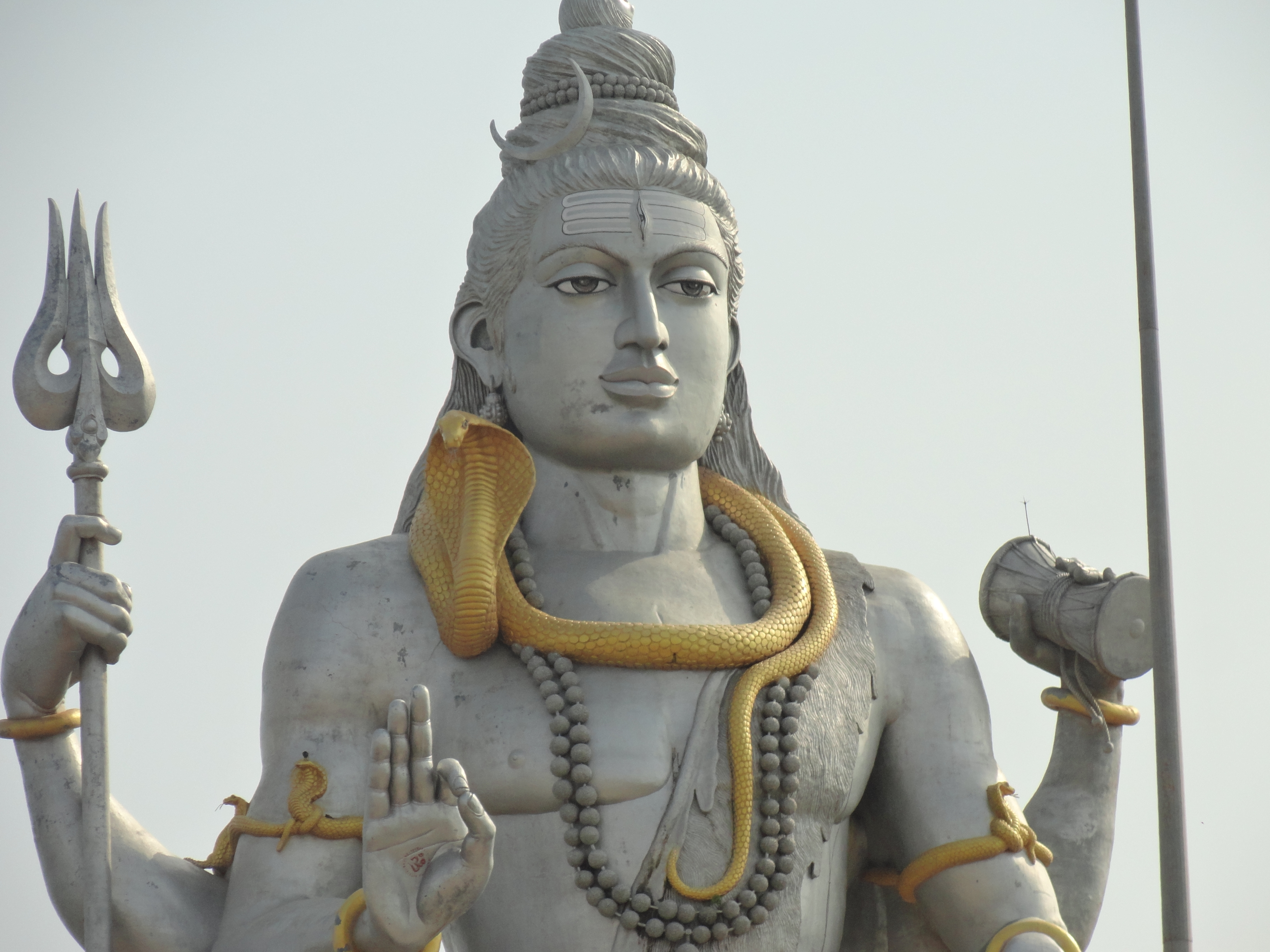
- Vasuki depicted around the neck of Shiva in Karnataka.
- Devanagari: वासुकि
- Sanskrit transliteration: Vāsuki
- Venerated in: Shaivism
- Associate: Shiva
- Abode: Kailasha
- Symbols: Nagamani
- Texts: Mahabharata
- Gender: Male

Genealogy
- Parents: Kadru (mother); Kashyapa (father)
- Siblings: Manasa, Shesha etc.
- Consort: Shatashirsha

Vasuki (Sanskrit: वासुकि, romanized: Vāsuki) is the king of the nagas in Hinduism. He is described as having a gem called Nāgamani (serpent's ornament) on his head. Shesha, another king of the nagas and the bed on which Vishnu rests, is his elder brother, and Manasa, another naga, is his sister. In Hindu iconography, he is generally depicted coiling around the neck of Shiva, who is believed to have blessed and worn him as an ornament.

He is known in Chinese and Japanese mythology as being one of the "eight Great Dragon Kings" (八大龍王 pinyin: Bādà lóngwáng; Japanese: Hachidai Ryūō), amongst Nanda (Nāgarāja), Upananda, Sāgara (Shakara), Takshaka, Balavan, Anavatapta, and Utpala.

== Legend ==
Vasuki is one of the sons of the sage Kashyapa and Kadru.

He is accorded a significant role in the legend of Samudra Manthana. He is described to have allowed both the devas and the asuras to bind him to Mount Mandara, so that they could use him as their churning rope to extract the amrita from the Ocean of Milk.

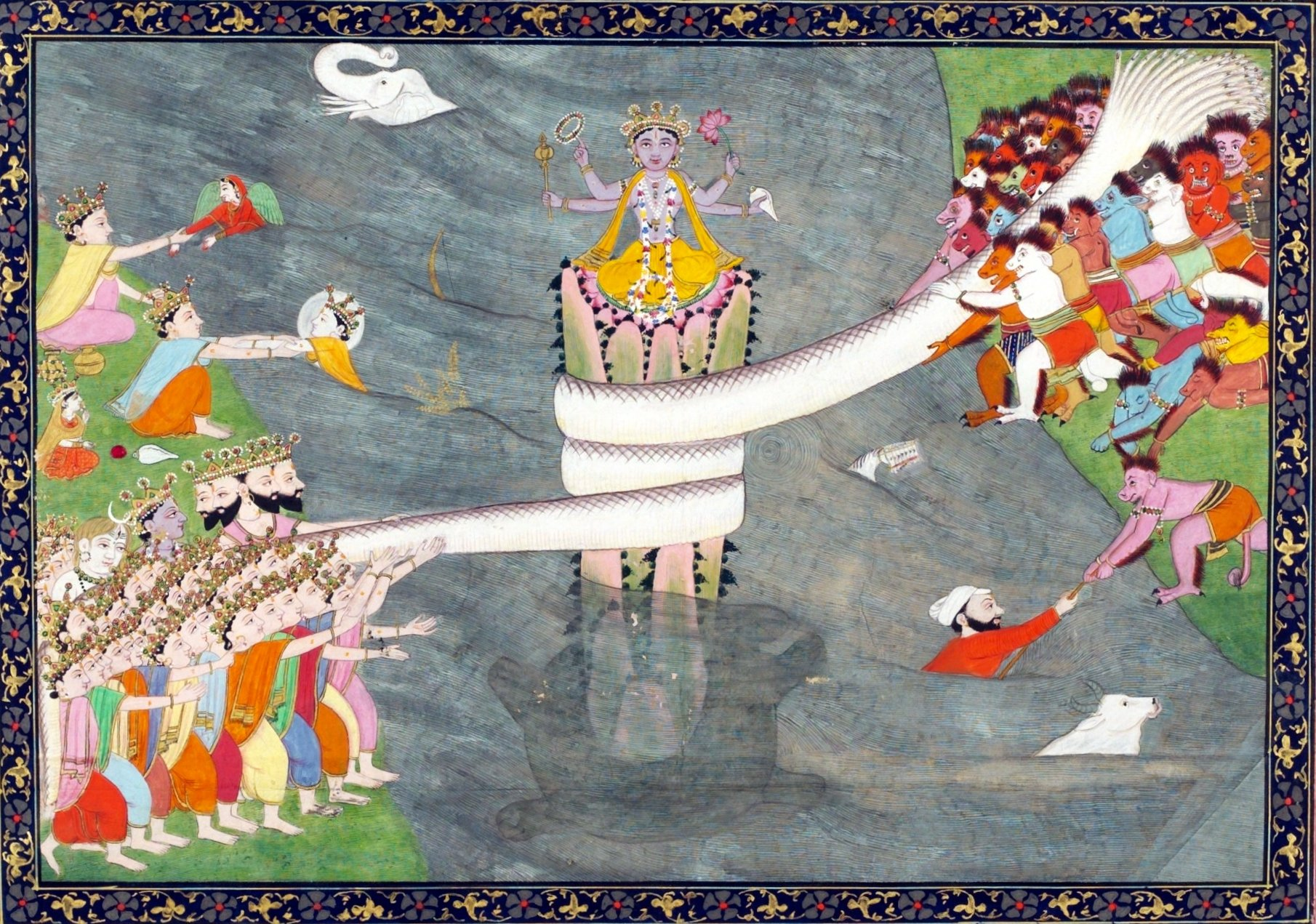
Vasuki being used to churn the ocean during Samudra Manthana

In the Mahabharata, Vasuki is stated to have been cursed by Kadru. He refused to aid her in her scheme of hanging to the tail of the divine horse Ucchaishshravas with his other siblings to cause it to appear black, so that she could cheat in her wager against her sister Vinata. Condemned to burn with numerous brothers in King Janamejaya's snake sacrifice, he sought refuge with the devas, participating in the churning of the ocean.

Having retreated to the netherworld, but wishing to save his brothers from the snake sacrifice, Vasuki sought the counsel of his siblings. One of them, Elapatra, stated that he had overheard Brahma informing the other deities that the son born to their sister named Jaratkaru and a sage who shared the same name would be their saviour. Vasuki made the arrangements to marry his sister to the sage. The son born to them, Astika, was able to successfully put an end to Janamejaya's persecution of the nagas.

In another episode of the Mahabharata, the Kaurava brothers administer poison to their cousin, Bhima, out of jealousy. They then throw him into the depths of the Ganges. Bhima sinks deep into the river and reaches the Nagaloka, where the nagas bite him, neutralizing the effects of the poison in his body. There he gets acquainted with a naga named Aryaka, who explains that his grandmother, Marisha, was also a naga. Based on this relationship, he introduces Bhima to Vasuki, king of the nagas, and Vasuki presents him with much wealth and other costly gems. Then Vasuki gives Bhima a divine drink, which gives him the strength of a thousand elephants.

== Buddhism ==
In the Buddhist religion, Vasuki and the other Naga Kings appear in the audience for many of Buddha's sermons. The duties of the naga Kings included leading the nagas in protecting and worshipping the Buddha, as well as protecting other enlightened beings. Vasuki's naga priest is Tatig Naga.

== Veneration ==
The Vāsuka/Vāsuca temple is located near Haripad, Mannarasala Illom in Kerala and the Visakha district in Andhra Pradesh. According to the regional legend of the Kukke Subramanya temple in Karnataka, the deity Kartikeya is regarded to have offered protection to Vasuki from the attack of Garuda, the mount of Vishnu.

== See also ==
- Snake worship
- Manasa
- Shesha

== Bibliography ==
- Handa, Om Chanda (2004), Naga Cults and Traditions in the Western Himalaya, Indus Publishing, ISBN 978-8173871610
