= Jaratkaru =

Sage in Hindu mythology

Information
- Affiliation: Yayavaras
- Spouse: Manasa
- Children: Astika

Jaratkaru (Sanskrit: जरत्कारु, romanized: Jaratkāru) is a rishi (sage) in Hinduism. He is the husband of the serpent-goddess Manasa and the father of their son, Astika. He appears as a secondary character in the tales of Manasa and Astika.

Jaratkaru is described as a great learned sage who practises severe asceticism. Though he wants to remain celibate, he marries Manasa on persuasion of his dead ancestors, who are doomed to fall to hell if he does not procreate. The marriage fails, with hardly any emotional bond between the couple. Jaratkaru finally forsakes Manasa when she wakes him up from his deep slumber, and he feels insulted. However, he blesses Manasa before leaving who gives birth to Astika in his absence. Little is known about his early life before meeting Manasa or his later life, after abandoning her.

== Etymology ==
The Hindu epic Mahabharata narrates that Jaratkaru was born in the lineage of the Yayavara Brahmanas and was the only heir of the clan. The etymology of his name is explained in the epic. Jara means "consumption" and Karu is "monstrous"; the sage had a huge body, which he reduced (consumed) by austerities. Thus, he was called Jaratkaru.

== Legend ==
Jaratkaru appears in the tales of Astika and Manasa in the Hindu scriptures Mahabharata, the Devi Bhagavata Purana, and the Brahma Vaivarta Purana. The tale of Astika is narrated twice in Astika Parva chapter of the first book of the Mahabharata, Adi Parva. He is also a character in folk tales related to the worship of his wife, the snake goddess.

In the first, shorter telling, Jaratkaru is described as being as powerful as a Prajapati, having performed severe tapas (austerities) and practised the vow of celibacy (Brahmacharya). In the second version, Jaratkaru is called a scholar of the Vedas and its branches, "controlled, great-spirited", and observant of great vows and austerities.

=== Meeting the manes ===
The "great ascetic" has wandered the world and visited various pilgrimage spots and sacred bodies of water. He has even renounced food and sleep, and survives only on air. He has become old. Once on his journey, he saw his emaciated ancestors hanging upside down with their heads in a hole that led to hell, with the grass root (Bena grass) that was holding them steadily being eaten by a rat. The manes cursed Jaratkaru's foolishness to be an ascetic and end his lineage of the Yayavaras. They begged him to marry and beget children so that they could attain heaven. While Jaratkaru resented the idea of taking a wife initially, he agrees to the following conditions: He will only take a virgin with the same name as his, who is given as alms to him by her family, notwithstanding his poverty. He moves ahead on his journey, having given this promise to his forebears. The second Mahabharata version adds two additional conditions: that the namesake woman should marry him of her own free will, and that he will not support his wife.

The poor and aged sage wanders the world in vain in search of a bride but does not find a suitable one. Once, in the forest, recalling the promise to his manes, he prays three times for a bride. In the second version, he cries out loud in frustration and sorrow over his futile efforts.

=== Marriage ===
Vasuki, the king of the nagas (serpents), awaits the arrival of the sage. As advised by the god Brahma, Vasuki has planned the marriage of his younger sister (known as Manasa in later texts) to Jaratkaru, the great seer in order to counter the curse given by the mother of the snakes, Kadru. She had cursed the snakes to be burnt at the yajna (fire-sacrifice) of Janamejaya. Brahma prophesied that the son of Jaratkaru and Manasa would stop the sacrifice, rescuing the serpents. Vasuki has also appointed serpents to keep watch on the sage and report back to him when the sage decides to marry.

Vasuki emerges and offers his younger sister Manasa to the sage, who accepts her after cross-checking with his criteria. Vasuki also promises to support Manasa. After the marriage, Jaratkaru lives in the abode of the serpents with his new wife. Jaratkaru warns his new wife that he would abandon her and his home if she ever displeases him, so she serves her eccentric husband dutifully. In due course, Jaratkaru unites with Manasa, making her pregnant.

The Brahma Vaivarta Purana portrays Manasa as the daughter of the sage Kashyapa, who is the one who betroths her to Jaratkaru. The marriage is never consummated as Jaratkaru even refuses to touch Manasa, and sleeps separately under a fig tree.

=== Abandonment of his wife ===
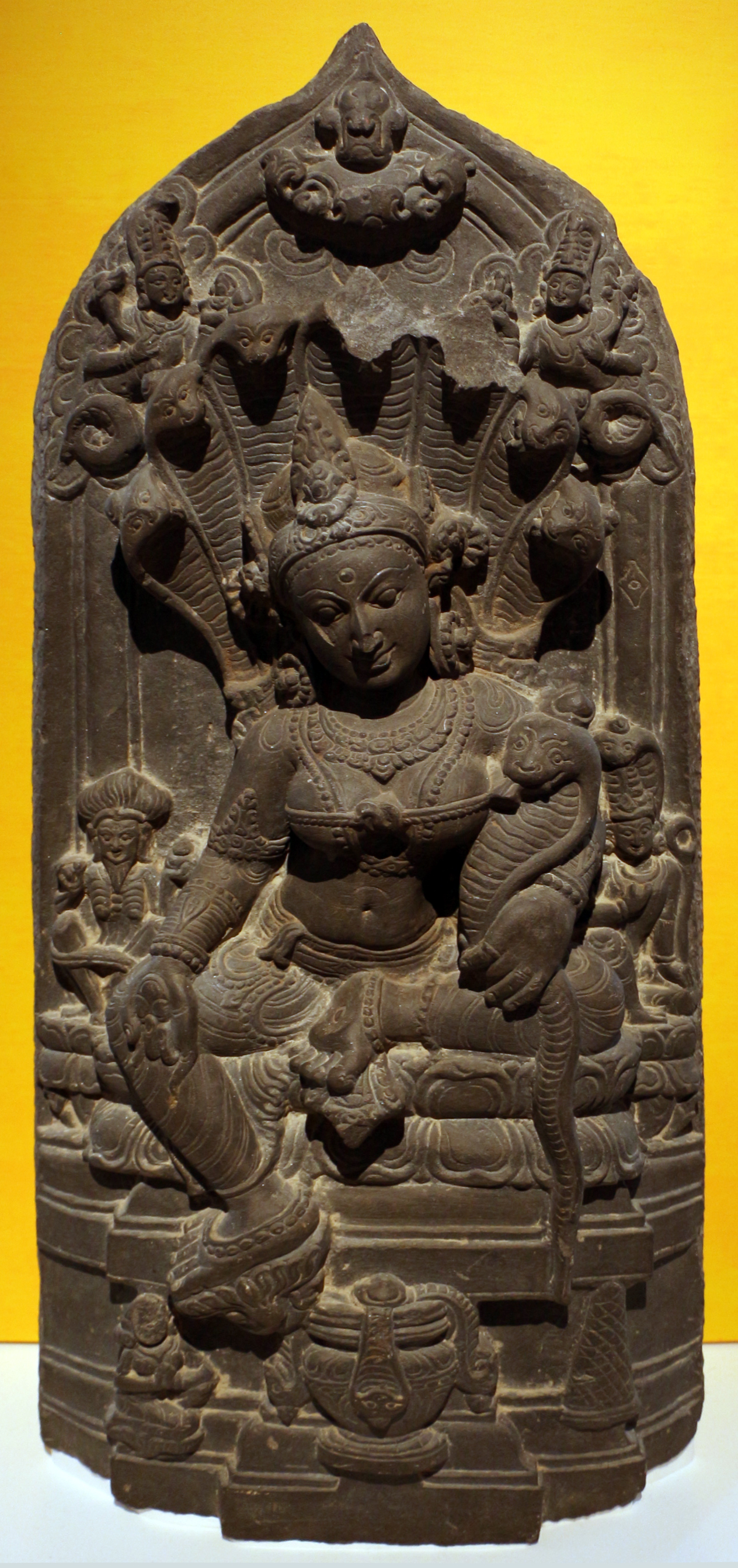
Manasa with her husband Jaratkaru (left) & son Astika (right) flanked by Nāgas, 11th century Pala period statue from Bengal

The Mahabharata continues in its longer telling: Soon after Jaratkaru impregnates his wife, the fatigued sage sleeps upon his wife's lap. As sunset nears, and it is time for evening worship, Manasa faces the dilemma whether to disturb the peaceful slumber of her husband, or let him sleep, and thus, risk him losing the merit of the obligatory worship. She weighs her options, and chooses the former. She whispers in his ears to awaken him, so that he may perform his ablutions and light the Agnihotra flame. The sage is enraged, and feels insulted. He says that the sun would not dare to set before he performs his rituals. He forsakes her, though the "innocent" wife begs his pardon and justifies her decision. She reveals to him the true purpose of their marriage, the birth of their son – saviour of the serpents – and asks him to wait until that purpose is fulfilled. The sage assures her that his seed is in her, and that she would deliver a learned son. Jaratkaru leaves to perform his austerities again, never to return again to his family.

The Brahma Vaivarta Purana narrates that Jaratkaru oversleeps and misses the time of his morning rituals. The agitated sage threatens to banish Manasa to the hell for disobedient wives. The Sun steps in and placates the sage, praising him as a powerful sage, but Jaratkaru has made up his mind to abandon his wife. The god Brahma intervenes and states that it will be inappropriate to abandon her, unless he grants her a child. Jaratkaru touches Manasa's abdomen and impregnates her. Then he departs, foretelling that Manasa will give birth to a renowned sage.

The Manasa Vijaya (1495) by Bipradas Pipilai, a devotional paean to Manasa from the Mangal-Kāvya genre, describes how Jaratkara (Jaratkaru) abandons his wife on their wedding night itself. Manasa is a daughter of the god Shiva, who is hated by Shiva's wife and her stepmother Chandi. Shiva marries Manasa to Jaratkara. Chandi does not want Manasa to have a happy married life and thus asks her to wear serpent ornaments on her wedding night. While Manasa sleeps in peace, Jaratkara stays awake in fear of the snakes. In the middle of the night, Chandi throws a frog in the room, which causes the snakes to hiss and swarm around the room in pursuit of the frog. A terrified Jaratkara runs away from the house and hides in a conch in the ocean. Further, he becomes scared of the snake goddess and refuses to stay with her. However, he spends a few nights with her and impregnates her and thus performs his "husbandly duty".

Little is told about the sage after his exit from Manasa's life and the main story. In due course, a son named Astika is born to the couple. Astika stops the sacrifice of Janamejaya and rescues the serpents. The ancestors reach heaven as Jaratkaru did procreate. The first telling in the Mahabharata says that after a long life, Jaratkaru dies and also attains heaven.
