= Lam Nam Kok National Park =

National park in Thailand

- อุทยานแห่งชาติลำน้ำกก
- IUCN category II (national park)
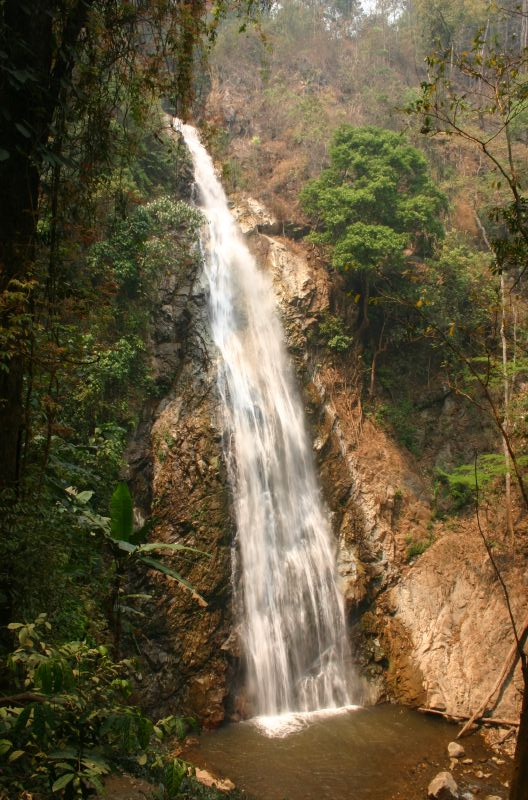
- Khunkorn Waterfall, a waterfall in the park

- Location within Thailand
- Location: Thailand
- Nearest city: Chiang Rai
- Coordinates: 19°57′16″N 99°42′39″E
- Area: 634.87 km^{2} (245.12 sq mi)
- Established: 10 May 2002
- Visitors: 197,144 (in 2019)
- Governing body: Department of National Parks, Wildlife and Plant Conservation

Lam Nam Kok National Park (Thai: อุทยานแห่งชาติลำน้ำกก, RTGS: Utthayan Haeng Chat Lam Nam Kok) is a national park in upper northern Thailand's Chiang Rai province. The national park covers an area of 634.87 square kilometres (245.12 sq mi) and was planted in 2002, occupies an area of four districts of Chiang Rai including Mueang Chiang Rai, Mae Chan, Mae Lao and Mae Suai. The head office is based in Doi Hang subdistrict, Mueang Chiang Rai district.

== Attractions ==
The park has beautiful landscape and lots of natural tourism destinations. Its name is based on the Kok River, the current that flows through the area. The river is 130 km (80.8 mi) long, its origin is on a mountain in Myanmar and flows along the borderline between Myanmar and Thailand. Then it flows on Thai ground at Tha Ton subdistrict, Mae Ai district in Chiang Mai province, then confluence Mekong River at Ban Sob Kok village in Chiang Saen district in the area of province of Chiang Rai. Cruise or rafting down the river is an interesting activity for visitors.

Wat Phuttha Utthayan Doi Insi: A Buddhist monastery located in the area of the park. The Department of National Parks, Wildlife and Plant Conservation (DNP) permitted Buddhist monks to stay in the forest for their dharma practicing legally. According to that monks and forest project, Buddhist monks are allowed to do their dharma practicing under a condition that they would help to look after the forest. The highlight is 15.1 m (49.5 ft) high white Buddha image in meditation posture and a 10 m (32.8 ft) tall cetiyas (pagodas) to be the spiritual anchor of Buddhist.

Huai Kaeo Waterfall: The beautiful three-tier waterfall, the highest and most beautiful tier is the third tier, is the highlight. At the first tier, the water flows from 20 m (65.6 ft) high cliff. The second tier is more beautiful than the first tier as the water flows from 30 m (98.4 ft) high cliff. On the third tier at a height of 40 m (131.2 ft), there is a bamboo bridge to facilitate visitors to walk closer the waterfall conveniently. All tiers have their own basins so visitors can swim. However, visitors have to strictly follow the officer's advice. The waterfall has water all year round.

Phasoet Hotspa: Hot springs available to visitors. There is a main well that pumps water to another well and cool down the water. Such well is on the other side. Hot mineral water will be piped to the pool or bathtub where users can adjust the temperature themselves. This place provides both private and shared bathing room and also provides Thai massage services as well. The hot springs are 20 km (12.4 mi) from city of Chiang Rai.

== Location ==
Lam Nam Kok National Park in overview PARO 15 (Chiang Rai)

4) Lam Nam Kok National Park in overview PARO 15 (Chiang Rai)

	National park
1	Doi Luang
2	Doi Phu Nang
3	Khun Chae
4	Lam Nam Kok
5	Mae Puem
6	Phu Chi Fa
7	Phu Sang
8	Tham Luang– Khun Nam Nang Non
	Wildlife sanctuary
9	Doi Pha Chang
10	Wiang Lo

	Non-hunting area
11	Chiang Saen
12	Doi Insi
13	Don Sila
14	Khun Nam Yom
15	Mae Chan
16	Mae Tho
17	Nong Bong Khai
18	Nong Leng Sai
19	Thap Phaya Lo
20	Wiang Chiang Rung
21	Wiang Thoeng

	Forest park
22	Doi Hua Mae Kham
23	Huai Nam Chang
24	Huai Sai Man
25	Namtok Huai Mae Sak
26	Namtok Huai Tat Thong
27	Namtok Khun Nam Yab
28	Namtok Mae Salong
29	Namtok Nam Min
30	Namtok Si Chomphu
31	Namtok Tat Khwan
32	Namtok Tat Sairung
33	Namtok Tat Sawan
34	Namtok Wang Than Thong
35	Phaya Phiphak
36	Rong Kham Luang
37	San Pha Phaya Phrai
38	Tham Pha Lae

== See also ==
- List of national parks of Thailand
- DNP - Lam Nam Kok National Park
- List of Protected Areas Regional Offices of Thailand
