= Tha Sai =

Coordinates: 6°52′N 101°27′E

Tha Sai ท่าสาย
- Subdistrict
- Interactive map of Tha Sai
- Country: Thailand
- Province: Chiang Rai
- District: Mueang Chiang Rai

Population (2005)
  - Total: 8,412
- Time zone: UTC+7 (ICT)

Tha Sai (Thai: ?) is a tambon (subdistrict) of Mueang Chiang Rai District, in Chiang Rai Province, Thailand. In 2005 it had a population of 8,412 people. The tambon contains 13 villages.
