= Chiang Rai =

City in Thailand

Chiang Rai เชียงราย ᨩ᩠ᨿᨦᩁᩣ᩠ᨿ
- City Municipality
- Chiang Rai Municipality เทศบาลนครเชียงราย ᩅ᩠ᨿᨦᨩ᩠ᨿᨦᩁᩣ᩠ᨿ
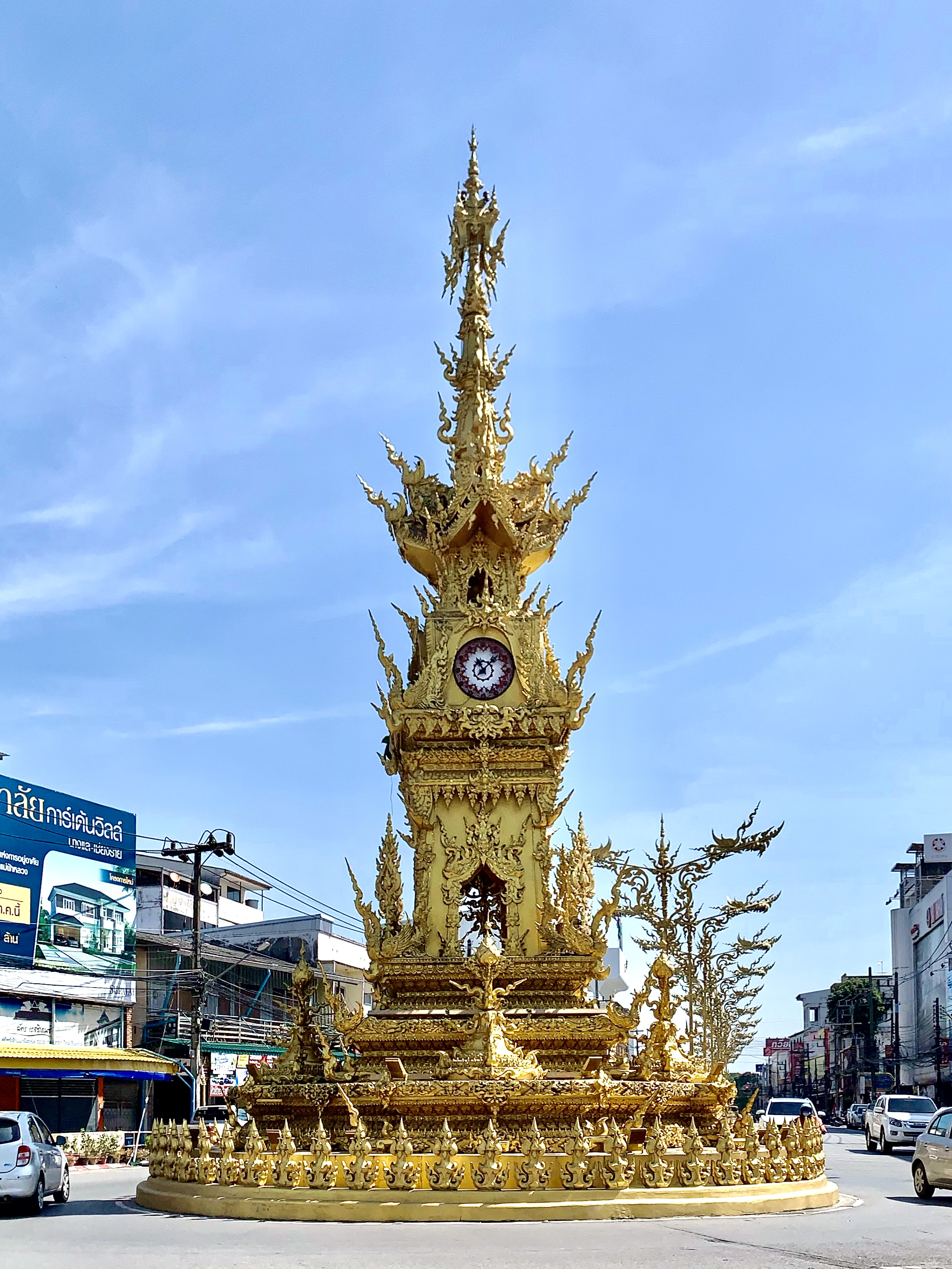
- Chiang Rai Clock Tower

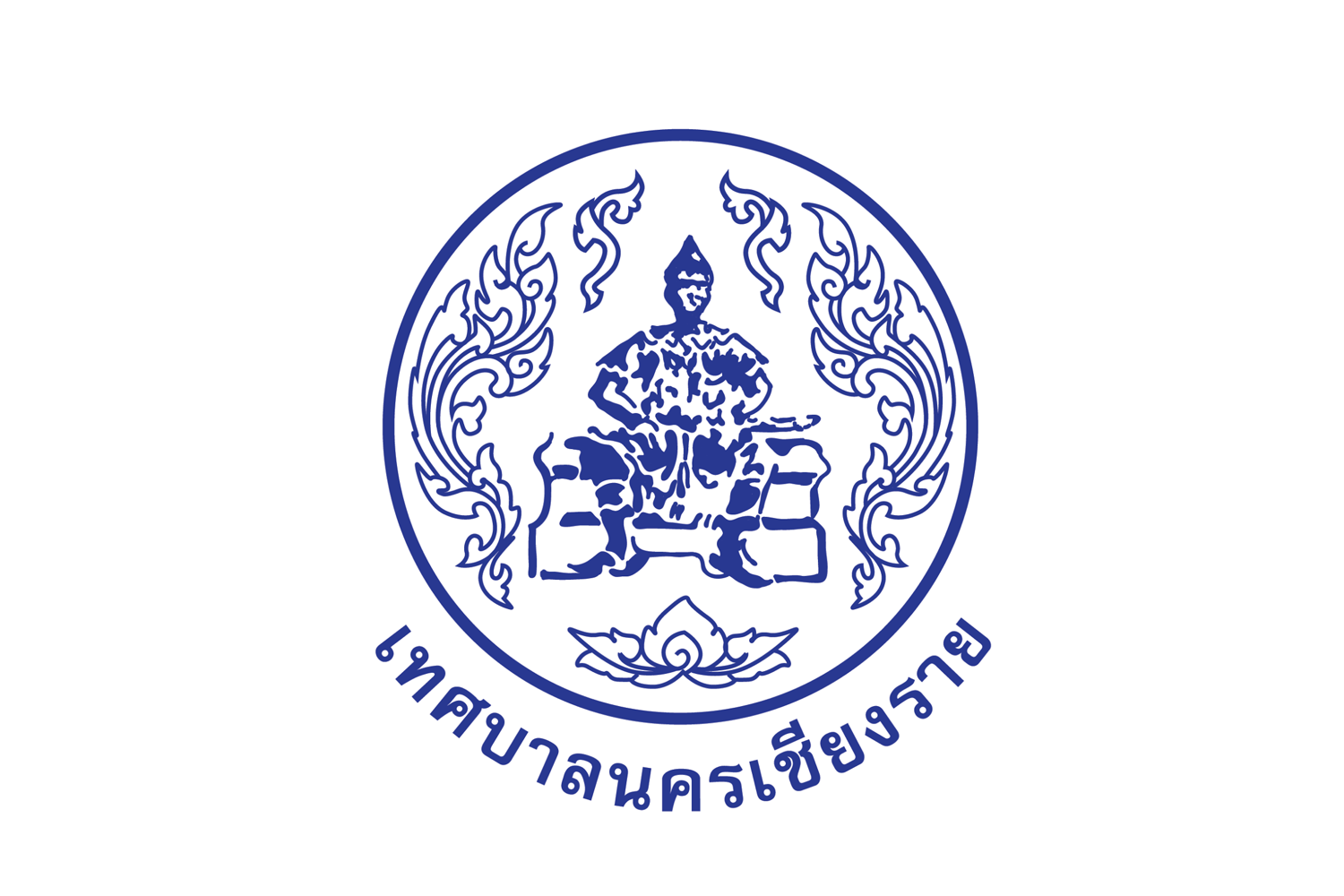
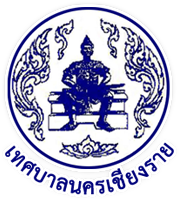
- Flag Seal
- Interactive map of Chiang Rai
- Location in Thailand Chiang Rai (Southeast Asia)
- Coordinates: 19°54′34″N 99°49′39″E
- Country: Thailand
- Province: Chiang Rai Province
- District: Mueang Chiang Rai
- City municipality: 13 February 2004
- Founder: King Mangrai
- Subdistricts: 4: Wiang; Rop Wiang; Rim Kok; San Sai

Government
  - Type: City municipality
  - Mayor: Wanchai Chongsutthamani

Area
  - Total: 60.85 km^{2} (23.49 sq mi)
- Elevation: 390 m (1,280 ft)

Population (2012)
  - Total: 69,888
  - Density: 1,149/km^{2} (2,975/sq mi)
- Time zone: UTC+7 (ICT)
- Postal code: 57000
- Area code: (+66) 53
- Geocode: 5100
- Airport: Chiang Rai International Airport; Old Chiang Rai Airport
- Website: chiangraicity.go.th

Chiang Rai (Thai: เชียงราย, pronounced [tɕʰīaŋ rāːj]; Lanna: ᨩ᩠ᨿᨦᩁᩣ᩠ᨿ, pronounced [tɕīaŋ hāːj]) is the northernmost major city in Thailand, with a population of approximately 70,000 people. It is located in Mueang Chiang Rai District, Chiang Rai Province. Chiang Rai was established as a capital during the reign of King Mangrai, in 1262 CE. Chiang Rai is recognized as a "Design City" by UNESCO's Creative Cities Network.

Chiang Rai
- "Chiang Rai" in Thai language (top) and Northern Thai with Tai Tham script (bottom)

Thai name
- Thai: เชียงราย
- RTGS: Chiang Rai

Northern Thai name
- Northern Thai: ᨩ᩠ᨿᨦᩁᩣ᩠ᨿ เจียงฮาย [tɕīaŋ hāːj]

== History ==
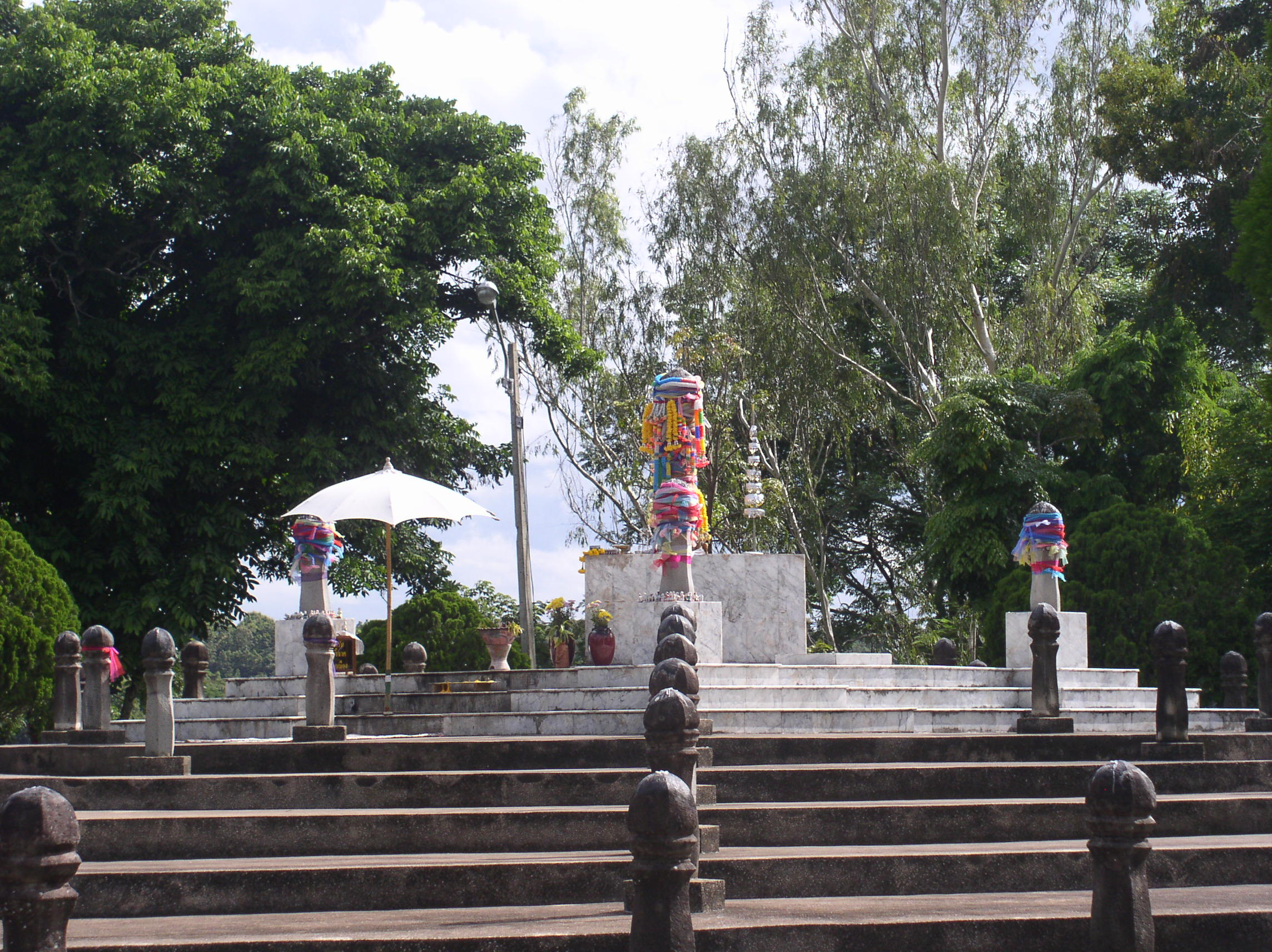
Sadue Mueang, omphalos of the city

The city was founded by King Mangrai in 1262 and became the capital of the Mangrai Dynasty. The word 'Chiang' means 'city' in Thai, so Chiang Rai would mean 'the City of (Mang) Rai'. Subsequently, Chiang Rai was conquered by Burma and remained under Burmese rule for several hundred years. It was not until 1786 that Chiang Rai became a Siam vassal. Siam (later Thailand) annexed the Kingdom of Chiang Mai in 1893 as a Monthon, which Chiang Rai joined later in 1910. It's not before 1933 that Chiang Rai became a full province of Thailand.

In 1432, during the reign of King Sam Fang Kaen of the Mangrai Dynasty (1402–1441), the Phra Kaeo, or Emerald Buddha, the most revered Buddha statue, was discovered in Chiang Rai when an earthquake split the chedi at Wat Phra Kaeo of Chiang Rai city. The jade figure was then seen concealed within. Another telling of the story has the "Emerald Buddha" hastily covered in mud just before marauders entered to pillage. Many years later, the clunky-looking mud Buddha was found to actually house a magnificent jade statue, perhaps by way of the earthquake mentioned above—which caused a piece of the clay to break off—revealing the jade beneath.

In 1992, the city pillar was moved from Wat Klang Wiang to Wat Phra That Doi Chom Thong, where it is known as Sadue Mueang (Thai: สะดือเมือง), the "navel" or omphalos of the city.

== Geography ==
Chiang Rai lies on the flat alluvial plain of the Kok River, a tributary of the Mekong, between the Daen Lao Range in the north and the Phi Pan Nam Range in the south. The Kok River runs along Chiang Rai's north side, flowing eastwards out of Burma at Tha Ton (ท่าตอม) town, bending north-eastwards and joining the Mekong River about 40 kilometres (25 mi) north-east of the city. The Lao River, a tributary of the Kok, flows south of Chiang Rai.

There are four bridges spanning the Kok River within the town's boundaries, each running south–north. Most of the terrain surrounding Chiang Rai town is either flat or has moderate hills. The exception is outward in the west and north-west directions, where limestone hills are evident, some of which have vertical exposed cliffs. That is also the direction where most of the region's hill tribe people have their villages, further afield.

The city is 860 kilometres (530 mi) north of Bangkok, about 200 kilometres (120 mi) north-east of Chiang Mai, 62 kilometres (39 mi) south of Mae Sai and the Burmese border; 60 kilometres (37 mi) south-west of the town of Chiang Saen on the Mekong River across from Laos; and 90 kilometres (56 mi) north of Phayao town. The Golden Triangle, the tripoint of the Thailand, Laos and Myanmar borders, is 55 kilometres (34 mi) north-east of the city.

== Climate ==
Chiang Rai has a tropical wet and dry climate (Köppen climate classification Aw). Winters are fairly dry and warm. Temperatures rise until April, which is hot with the average daily maximum at 34.5 °C (94.1 °F). The monsoon season runs from late April through October, with heavy rain and somewhat cooler temperatures during the day, although nights remain warm.

Climate data for Chiang Rai (1991–2020, extremes 1951-present)
Month	Jan	Feb	Mar	Apr	May	Jun	Jul	Aug	Sep	Oct	Nov	Dec	Year
Record high °C (°F)	34.3 (93.7)	37.0 (98.6)	39.3 (102.7)	41.3 (106.3)	42.0 (107.6)	39.6 (103.3)	38.5 (101.3)	35.6 (96.1)	35.0 (95.0)	34.6 (94.3)	34.9 (94.8)	33.5 (92.3)	42.0 (107.6)
Mean daily maximum °C (°F)	28.6 (83.5)	31.3 (88.3)	33.7 (92.7)	34.7 (94.5)	33.5 (92.3)	32.5 (90.5)	31.3 (88.3)	30.9 (87.6)	31.4 (88.5)	30.9 (87.6)	29.6 (85.3)	27.8 (82.0)	31.4 (88.4)
Daily mean °C (°F)	20.2 (68.4)	21.9 (71.4)	24.8 (76.6)	27.2 (81.0)	27.5 (81.5)	27.5 (81.5)	26.9 (80.4)	26.6 (79.9)	26.5 (79.7)	25.4 (77.7)	22.9 (73.2)	20.2 (68.4)	24.8 (76.6)
Mean daily minimum °C (°F)	13.8 (56.8)	14.5 (58.1)	17.5 (63.5)	21.1 (70.0)	23.0 (73.4)	24.0 (75.2)	23.9 (75.0)	23.7 (74.7)	23.1 (73.6)	21.5 (70.7)	17.9 (64.2)	14.7 (58.5)	19.9 (67.8)
Record low °C (°F)	1.5 (34.7)	6.5 (43.7)	7.6 (45.7)	14.7 (58.5)	17.1 (62.8)	20.6 (69.1)	20.6 (69.1)	20.7 (69.3)	17.0 (62.6)	12.7 (54.9)	5.0 (41.0)	1.5 (34.7)	1.5 (34.7)
Average precipitation mm (inches)	16.5 (0.65)	12.7 (0.50)	34.5 (1.36)	92.6 (3.65)	226.5 (8.92)	186.2 (7.33)	317.6 (12.50)	372.9 (14.68)	275.1 (10.83)	123.5 (4.86)	44.8 (1.76)	20.6 (0.81)	1,723.4 (67.85)
Average precipitation days (≥ 1.0 mm)	1.5	1.2	2.9	7.9	14.5	14.6	19.6	20.5	14.7	8.3	3.5	1.9	111.1
Average relative humidity (%)	74.4	67.2	64.2	67.2	74.7	78.8	82.1	84.1	82.9	80.9	78.2	76.5	75.9
Average dew point °C (°F)	14.7 (58.5)	14.5 (58.1)	16.4 (61.5)	19.7 (67.5)	22.0 (71.6)	23.2 (73.8)	23.4 (74.1)	23.5 (74.3)	23.1 (73.6)	21.6 (70.9)	18.4 (65.1)	15.4 (59.7)	19.7 (67.5)
Mean monthly sunshine hours	248.6	242.7	243.7	245.8	216.2	158.9	123.2	126.0	163.3	197.8	224.4	222.2	2,412.6
Mean daily sunshine hours	8.8	9.1	9.5	9.3	6.4	5.3	3.9	3.8	4.8	6.4	8.3	8.1	7.0
Source 1: World Meteorological Organization, (extremes)
Source 2: Office of Water Management and Hydrology, Royal Irrigation Department (daily sun 1981–2010)

Chiang Rai

Climate chart (precipitation, max. and min. temperature)
J	F	M	A	M	J	J	A	S	O	N	D
16 28 13	12 31 14	33 33 17	91 34 20	225 33 22	186 32 23	317 31 23	372 31 23	275 31 23	123 30 21	44 29 17	20 27 14
- █ Average max. and min. temperatures in °C
- █ Precipitation totals in mm
- Source: Thai Meteorological Department
Imperial conversion
J	F	M	A	M	J	J	A	S	O	N	D
0.6 82 55	0.5 88 57	1.3 91 63	3.6 93 68	8.9 91 72	7.3 90 73	12 88 73	15 88 73	11 88 73	4.8 86 70	1.7 84 63	0.8 81 57
- █ Average max. and min. temperatures in °F
- █ Precipitation totals in inches

== Demographics ==
According to the Thai National Statistical Office, as of September 2010, Chiang Rai municipal district had a population of 199,699. With the spread of the city extending into neighboring districts, the metropolitan area is considered somewhat larger by local residents. Chiang Rai city is the capital city and business center of the Chiang Rai Province, home to 1.1 million residents.

A significant share—12.5 percent—of the population are of hill tribes descent. "Hill tribes" is a collective term for the minority ethnic groups in north Thailand such as the Karen, Akha, Lisu, Miao, and Hmong.

== Government ==
Chiang Rai City is the capital of Chiang Rai Province.

The city hall 19°54.805′N 99°49.615′E houses the provincial offices. The thesaban houses the municipal offices 19°54′34″N 99°49′39″E.

== Buddhist temples ==
- Wat Phra That Doi Chom Thong, 19°54.970′N 99°49.365′E
- Wat Phra Kaeo, Chiang Rai, 19°54.704′N 99°49.647′E
- Wat Phra Sing, Chiang Rai, 19°54.653′N 99°49.882′E
- Wat Doi Khao Khwai, 19°52.892′N 99°48.582′E
- Wat Rong Khun, 19°49.480′N 99°45.800′E, a modern temple built since 1998 by Thai artist Chalermchai Kositpipat
- Chedi Doi Trimoorati, 19°57′36.48″N 99°49′14.70″E

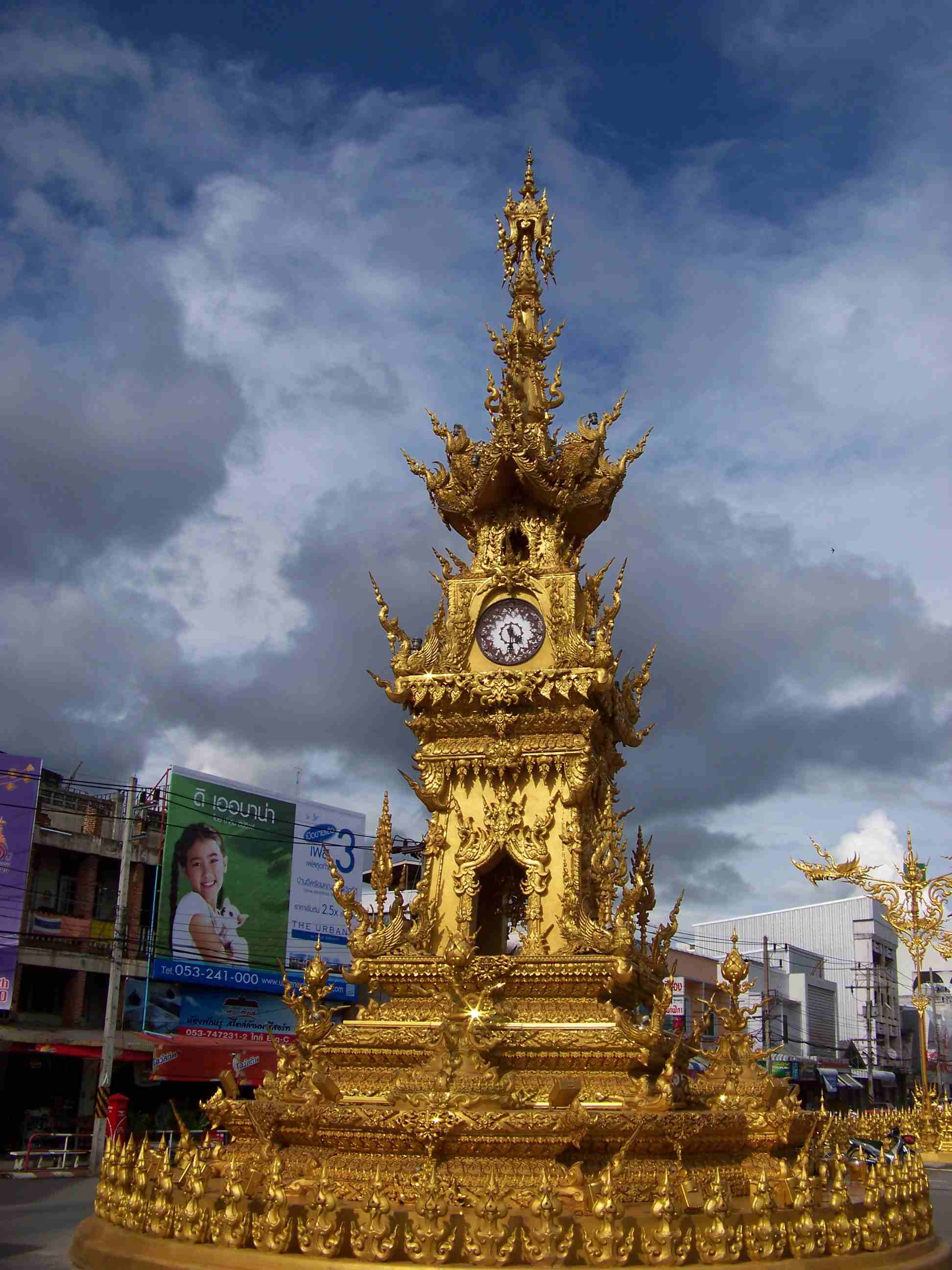
Chiang Rai Clock Tower in Wiang Mueang area

== Education ==
=== Colleges and universities ===
- Mae Fah Luang University
- Chiang Rai Rajabhat University
- Rajamangala University of Technology Lanna, Chiang Rai Campus

=== International schools ===
- Chiang Rai International School
- Chiang Rai International Christian School 19°57.022′N 99°49.893′E
- One Hope International School

=== High schools ===
- Samakkhi Witthayakhom School 19°54.314′N 99°49.598′E
- Damrongratsongkroh School
- Chiang Rai Witthayakhom School
- Chiangrai municiplarity school 6
- Chiang Rai International School

=== Primary schools ===
- PSEP Bilingual School.
- Bansankhong (Chiangraijaroonrat) School 19°54.045′N 99°49.671′E
- Piti Suksa Montessori School 19°55.400′N 99°49.950′E
- AMEC School, Chiang Rai 19°50.660′N 99°48.114′E

== Hospitals ==
In 2018 the survivors of the Tham Luang cave rescue were brought to Chiang Rai, the nearest large city for hospital care.

- Overbrook Hospital (semi-private) Founded in 1903 by Dr. William A. Briggs, as a Missionary hospital.
- Kasemrad Sriburin General Hospital, Private hospital.
- Chiang Rai Prachanukhro Hospital, Public hospital.
- Fort Mengraimaharaj Hospital, Military public hospital.
- Chiang Rai Inter Hospital, Private hospital.
- Bangkok Hospital - Chiang Rai, Private hospital by BDMS chain.

== Transportation ==
Route 1 runs from Bangkok through Chiang Rai to Mae Sai on the Burma border. Chiang Rai is 839 kilometers from Bangkok, about 14 hours by car or by bus. According to official bus schedules, the bus ride to Chiang Rai from Chiang Mai takes approximately 3 hours and 30 minutes, All of these times should take into account the rainy season which lasts from about June to late October, this can severely inhibit travel with road sections often completely flooded and even washed out.

Several flights are available to and from Bangkok daily. Chiang Rai International Airport flight time is about 1 hour and 30 minutes. There are several major operators including Thai Airways, Air Asia, Nok Air.

There is scheduled boat service between Chiang Rai and Thaton in Chiang Mai Province daily. This journey will last about 3–4 hours and is a pleasant alternative to the bus ride through the mountains.

There are currently no rail services to Chiang Rai as the railway line from Bangkok ends at Chiang Mai. Nonetheless, new 323 kilometer-long branch line, from Den Chai to the Lao border at Chiang Khong and passing through Chiang Rai, is under construction and is expected to open in 2028.
