= Mae Kon =

Coordinates: 19.8369°N 99.7097°E

Mae Kon แม่กรณ์
- Subdistrict
- Interactive map of Mae Kon
- Country: Thailand
- Province: Chiang Rai
- District: Mueang Chiang Rai

Population (2005)
  - Total: 6,439
- Time zone: UTC+7 (ICT)

Mae Kon (Thai: แม่กรณ์) is a tambon (subdistrict) of Mueang Chiang Rai District, in Chiang Rai Province, Thailand. In 2005 it had a population of 6439 people. The tambon contains 13 villages.
