= Tha Sut =

Tha Sut ท่าสุด
- Subdistrict
- Country: Thailand
- Province: Chiang Rai
- District: Mueang Chiang Rai

Population (2005)
  - Total: 10,267
- Time zone: UTC+7 (ICT)

Tha Sut (Thai: ท่าสุด) is a tambon (subdistrict) of Mueang Chiang Rai District, in Chiang Rai Province, Thailand. In 2005 it had a population of 10,267 people. The tambon contains 11 villages.
