= Huai Sak =

Huai Sak ห้วยสัก
- Tambon
- Interactive map of Huai Sak
- Coordinates: 19°47′52″N 99°54′11″E
- Country: Thailand
- Province: Chiang Rai
- Amphoe: Mueang Chiang Rai

Population (2018)
  - Total: 17,302
- Time zone: UTC+7 (TST)
- Postal code: 57000
- TIS 1099: 570113

Huai Sak (Thai: ห้วยสัก, pronounced [hûa̯j sàk]) is a tambon (subdistrict) of Mueang Chiang Rai District, in Chiang Rai Province, Thailand. In 2018, it had a total population of 17,302 people.

== Administration ==
=== Central administration ===
The tambon is subdivided into 31 administrative villages (muban).

No.	Name	Thai
1.	Ban Pong Hueng	บ้านโป่งฮึ้ง
2.	Ban Pong Hueng	บ้านโป่งฮึ้ง
3.	Ban Thung Pa Yang	บ้านทุ่งป่ายาง
4.	Ban Pa Ko	บ้านป่าก๊อ
5.	Ban Huai Sak	บ้านห้วยสัก
6.	Ban Pa Yaeng	บ้านป่าแหย่ง
7.	Ban Rong Pla Khao	บ้านร่องปลาขาว
8.	Ban Rong Phiao	บ้านร่องเผียว
9.	Ban Rong Boe Nai	บ้านร่องเบ้อใน
10.	Ban Dong Pa Miang	บ้านดงป่าเมี้ยง
11.	Ban Hua Dong	บ้านหัวดง
12.	Ban Rong Boe Nok	บ้านร่องเบ้อนอก
13.	Ban San Pa Hiang	บ้านสันป่าเหียง
14.	Ban San Ton Pao	บ้านสันต้นเปา
15.	Ban San Sali	บ้านสันสลี
16.	Ban Pong Kham	บ้านโป่งขาม
17.	Ban San Khong Mai	บ้านสันโค้งใหม่
18.	Ban Rong Phiao	บ้านร่องเผียว
19.	Ban Rong Boe	บ้านร่องเบ้อ
20.	Ban Mai Na Wa	บ้านใหม่นาวา
21.	Ban Don Chum	บ้านดอนชุม
22.	Ban Pa Ko	บ้านป่าก๊อ
23.	Ban Rong Pla Khao	บ้านร่องปลาขาว
24.	Ban Rong Phiao	บ้านร่องเผียว
25.	Ban Mai San Pa Hiang	บ้านใหม่สันป่าเหียง
26.	Ban Pong Hueng	บ้านโป่งฮึ้ง
27.	Ban Huai Sak Mai	บ้านห้วยสักใหม่
28.	Ban Mai San Ton Pao	บ้านใหม่สันต้นเปา
29.	Ban Rong Boe	บ้านร่องเบ้อ
30.	Ban Pa Ko	บ้านป่าก้อ
31.	Ban Noen Saduak	บ้านเนินสะดวก

=== Local administration ===
The whole area of the subdistrict is covered by the subdistrict municipality (Thesaban Tambon) Huai Sak (เทศบาลตำบลห้วยสัก).
