= Pa O Don Chai =

Pa O Don Chai ป่าอ้อดอนชัย
- Subdistrict
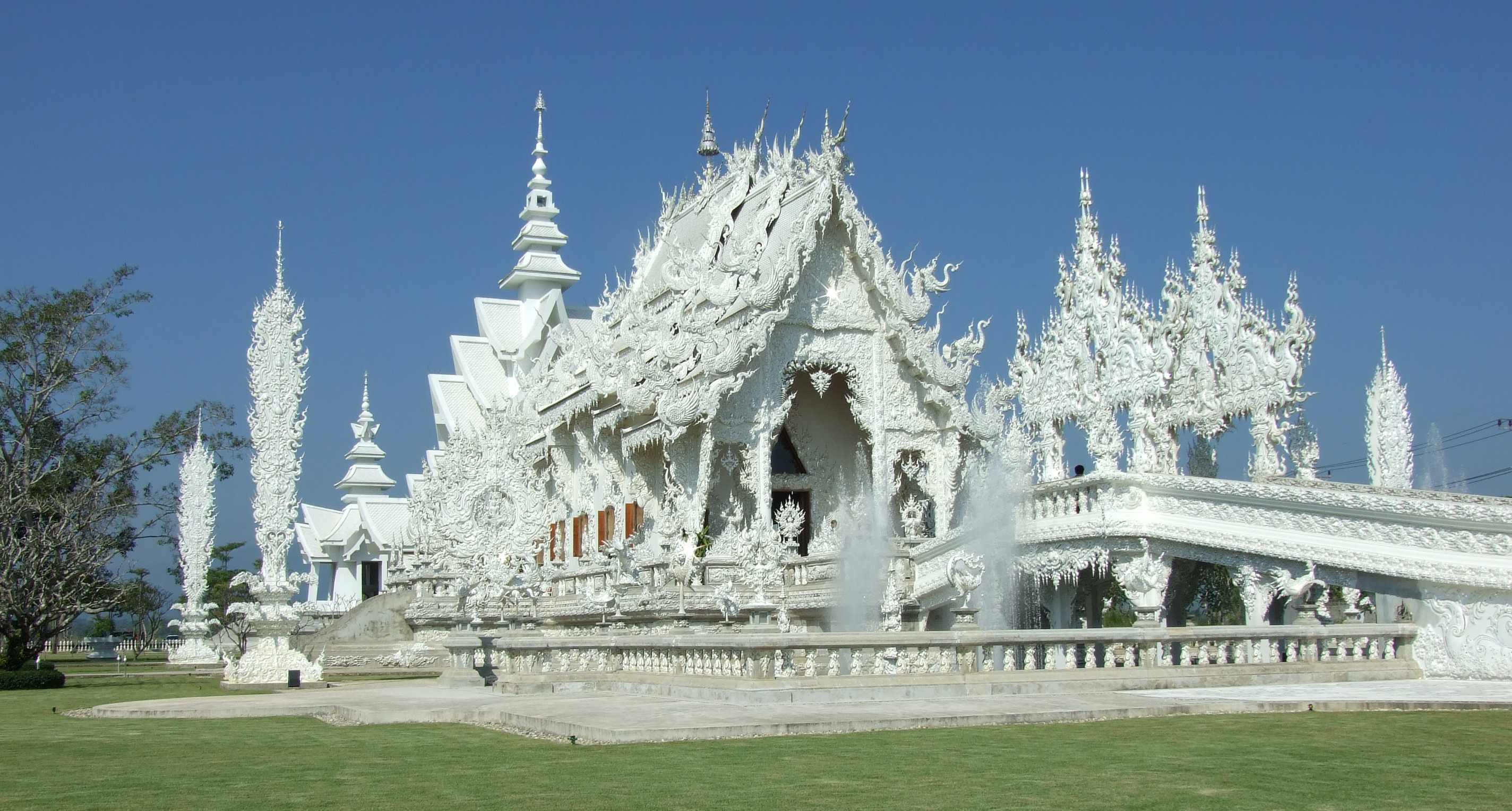
- Wat Rong Khun, Pa O Don Chai
- Interactive map of Pa O Don Chai
- Country: Thailand
- Province: Chiang Rai
- District: Mueang Chiang Rai

Population (2005)
  - Total: 9,849
- Time zone: UTC+7 (ICT)

Pa O Don Chai (Thai: ป่าอ้อดอนชัย) is a tambon (subdistrict) of Mueang Chiang Rai District, in Chiang Rai Province, Thailand. In 2005 it had a population of 9,849 people. The tambon contains 21 villages.
