= Mae Khao Tom =

Mae Khao Tom แม่ข้าวต้ม
- Subdistrict
- Country: Thailand
- Province: Chiang Rai
- District: Mueang Chiang Rai

Population (2005)
  - Total: 12,500
- Time zone: UTC+7 (ICT)

Mae Khao Tom (Thai: แม่ข้าวต้ม) is a tambon (subdistrict) of Mueang Chiang Rai District, in Chiang Rai Province, Thailand. In 2005 it had a population of 12,500 people. The tambon contains 23 villages.
