= Huai Chomphu =

Huai Chomphu ห้วยชมภู
- Subdistrict
- Country: Thailand
- Province: Chiang Rai
- District: Mueang Chiang Rai

Population (2005)
  - Total: 13,494
- Time zone: UTC+7 (ICT)

Huai Chomphu (Thai: ห้วยชมภู) is a tambon (subdistrict) of Mueang Chiang Rai District, in Chiang Rai Province, Thailand. In 2005, it had a population of 13,494 people. The tambon contains 11 villages.
