= Chamnongsri Rutnin =

Khunying Chamnongsri (Rutnin) Hanchanlash (born 1939) Thai writer, social-mover/advocate for "good death", lecturer, business executive, and social media personality. Chairperson of Rutnin Eye Hospital, Bangkok; Senior Advisor of the Health Promotion Board of Thailand; founding director of Cheevamit Social Enterprise (for end-of-life care in Thailand).

Educated in England, she returned to Thailand at 18, worked as a reporter and columnist for an English language newspaper until her marriage to Ophthalmologist Uthai Rutnin (died 1993). Together, they established the Rutnin Eye Hospital in Bangkok. After his death, she established the Uthai Rutnin Foundation in 1995 to support and promote ophthalmology-related knowledge and chairs its board of directors. In the 1990s, she established Harbor House Foundation in Chiang Rai to help girls at risk of human trafficking, and was actively involved with the Thailand Institute of Justice in dealing with domestic violence. A passionate advocate and social-mover for end-of-care in Thailand, she established Cheevamitr Social Enterprise in January 2017. Her Facebook Page Chamnongsri Hanchanlash/awareness focusing on quality of thought, quality of aging and dying has a wide following.

She married Dr. Jingjai Hanchanlash in 1997.

Originally producing mainly poetry and stories, her work now includes plays, children's literature, essays and biography. Much of her writing reflects deep interest in Buddhism and meditation. She has translated a number of Thai literature onto English.

== Awards ==
- John A. Eakin Foundation Award
- National Book Award for Children's Literature

== Selected works ==
- Where Dusk Ends, play, received the John A. Eakin Foundation Award
- On the White Empty Page, poetry (English)
- Fon Tok Yang Tong, Fa Rong Yang Thueng (Touched by rain, reached by thunder), poetry (Thai)
- Boats in Mid-Ocean, biographical history of her maternal Chinese family' assimilation
- "Vicha Tua Bao", philosophy/psychology
- "Kenkrok Tua Bao", philosophy /psychology
- Kaewta's Horizon, play
- Orange-8-Legs, the National Book Award for Children's Literature
- "Gecko Gup", the National Book Award for Children's Literature
