= Doi Hang =

Doi Hang ดอยฮาง
- Subdistrict
- Country: Thailand
- Province: Chiang Rai
- District: Mueang Chiang Rai

Population (2005)
  - Total: 4,444
- Time zone: UTC+7 (ICT)

Doi Hang (Thai: ดอยฮาง) is a tambon (subdistrict) of Mueang Chiang Rai District, in Chiang Rai Province, Thailand. In 2005, it had a population of 4,444 people. The tambon contains eight villages.
