= Rim Kok =

Coordinates: 19.9854°N 99.9355°E

Rim Kok ริมกก
- Subdistrict
- Interactive map of Rim Kok
- Country: Thailand
- Province: Chiang Rai
- District: Mueang Chiang Rai

Population (2005)
  - Total: 16,239
- Time zone: UTC+7 (ICT)

Rim Kok (Thai: ริมกก, Thai pronunciation: [rīm kòk], lit: Kok riverside) is a tambon (subdistrict) of Mueang Chiang Rai District, in Chiang Rai Province, Thailand. In 2005 it had a population of 16,239 people. The tambon contains 11 villages.
