= San Sai, Mueang Chiang Rai =

San Sai, Mueang Chiang Rai สันทราย
- Subdistrict
- Country: Thailand
- Province: Chiang Rai
- District: Mueang Chiang Rai

Population (2005)
  - Total: 11,621
- Time zone: UTC+7 (ICT)

San Sai, Mueang Chiang Rai (Thai: สันทราย) is a tambon (subdistrict) of Mueang Chiang Rai District, in Chiang Rai Province, Thailand. In 2005 it had a population of 11,621 people. The tambon contains 11 villages.
