= Nang Lae =

Nang Lae นางแล
- Subdistrict
- Interactive map of Nang Lae
- Country: Thailand
- Province: Chiang Rai
- District: Mueang Chiang Rai

Population (2005)
  - Total: 10,312
- Time zone: UTC+7 (ICT)

Nang Lae (Thai: นางแล) is a tambon (subdistrict) of Mueang Chiang Rai District, in Chiang Rai Province, Thailand. In 2005 it had a population of 10,312 people. The tambon has 14 villages.
