= Kasemrad Sriburin General Hospital =

Kasemrad Sriburin General Hospital โรงพยาบาลเกษมราษฎร์ ศรีบุรินทร์

Geography
- Location: Chiang Rai Province, Thailand
- Coordinates: 19.878260°N 99.835484°E

Organisation
- Type: General

Services
- Beds: 120

History
- Opened: 1994

Links
- Website: www.kasemrad.co.th/Sriburin/en/site/home
- Lists: Hospitals in Thailand

Kasemrad Sriburin General Hospital or Kasemrad Hospital is a hospital in Chiang Rai Province in northeast Thailand. It is one of the most important hospitals in the province. It was established in 1993 by the Kasemrad Hospital group which is based in Bangkok.

The hospital is on the main highway (Hwy 1) in the city of Chiang Rai. It is a full-service hospital operating 24 hours a day with 120 beds. It is capable of providing routine medical care and state-of-the-art services in a variety of specialties.
