= Wiang subdistrict, Mueang Chiang Rai =

Wiang, Mueang Chiang Rai
- Subdistrict
- Country: Thailand
- Province: Chiang Rai
- District: Mueang Chiang Rai

Population (2005)
  - Total: 12,430
- Time zone: UTC+7 (ICT)

Wiang, Mueang Chiang Rai (Thai: ตำบล เวียง) is a tambon (subdistrict) of Mueang Chiang Rai District, iChiang Rai Province, Thailand. In 2005 Wiang had a population of 12,430 people. It has five villages.
