= Mueang Chiang Rai district =

Mueang Chiang Rai เมืองเชียงราย
- District
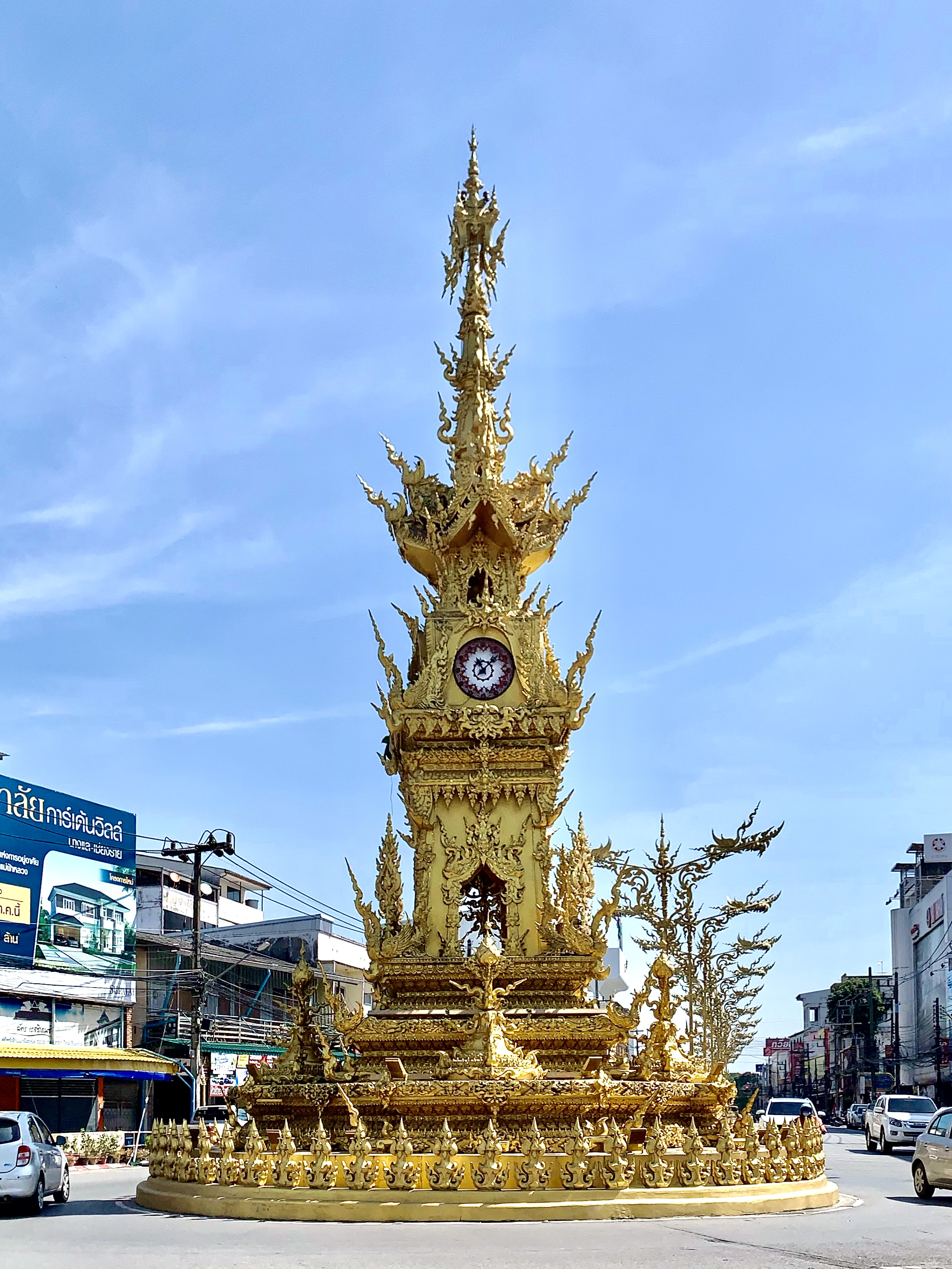
- Chiang Rai city clock tower, designed by Chalermchai Kositpipat, in the centre of Mueang Chaing Rai

- District location in Chiang Rai province
- Coordinates: 19°54′31″N 99°49′57″E
- Country: Thailand
- Province: Chiang Rai

Area
  - Total: 1,216.1 km^{2} (469.5 sq mi)

Population (2005)
  - Total: 227,142
  - Density: 186.8/km^{2} (484/sq mi)
- Time zone: UTC+7 (ICT)
- Postal code: 57000
- Geocode: 5701

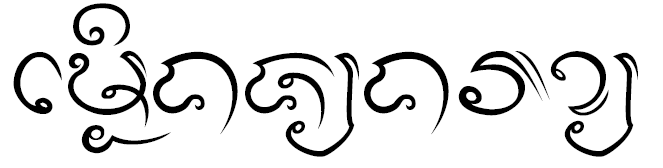
Mueang Chiang Rai (Thai: เมืองเชียงราย, pronounced [mɯ̄aŋ tɕʰīaŋ rāːj]; Northern Thai: , pronounced [mɯ̄aŋ tɕīaŋ hāːj]) is the capital district (amphoe mueang) of Chiang Rai Province, northern Thailand.

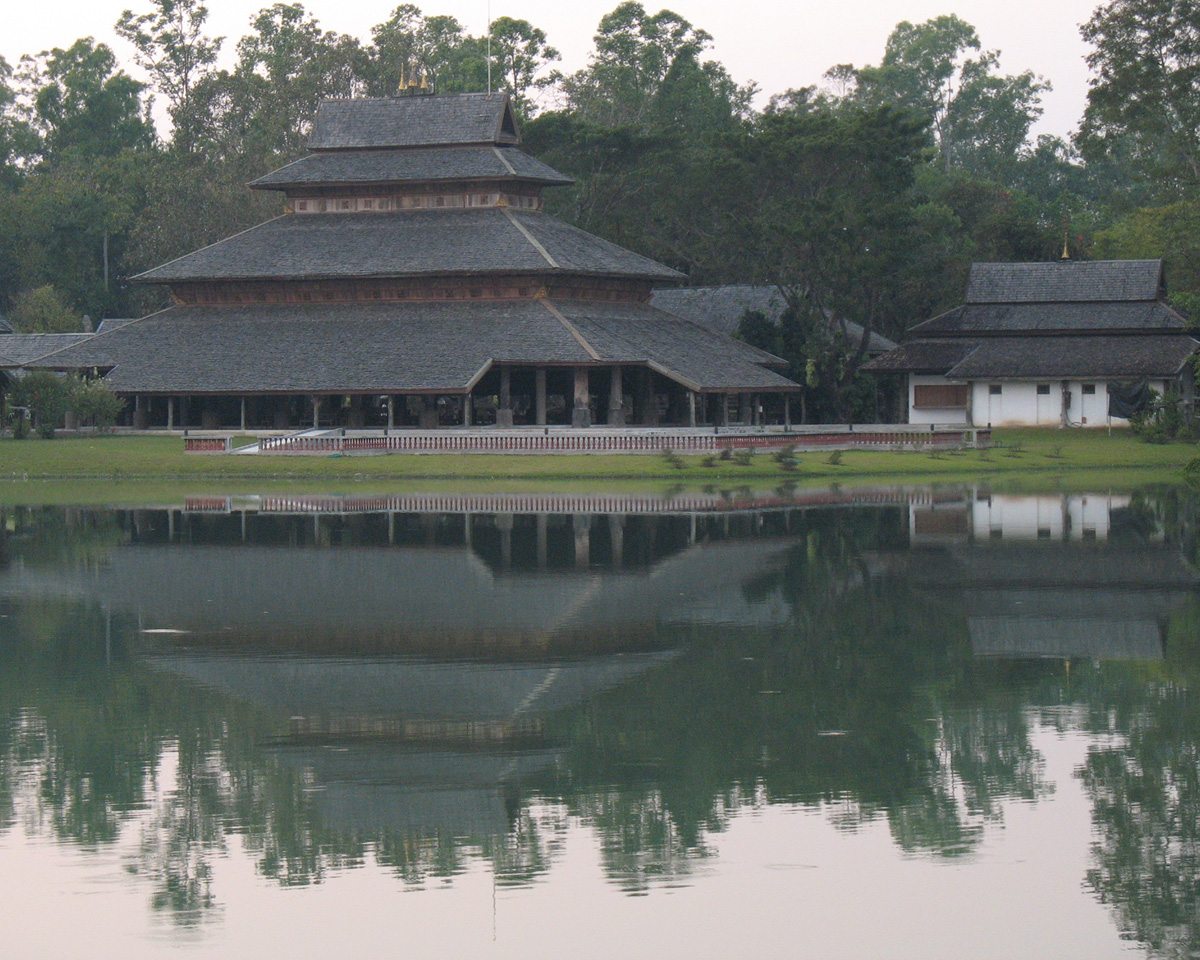
Rai Mae Fah Luang Art and Cultural Park, Tambon Rop Wiang, Mueang Chiang Rai district

== Geography ==
Neighboring districts are (from the northwest clockwise) Mae Fa Luang, Mae Chan, Wiang Chiang Rung, Wiang Chai, Thoeng, Pa Daet, Phan, Mae Lao, Mae Suai of Chiang Rai Province and Mae Ai of Chiang Mai province.

The Phi Pan Nam Mountains dominate the southern part of the district. The Kok River is an important water resource.

== Administration ==
The district is divided into 16 subdistricts (tambons), which are further subdivided into 256 villages (mubans). The city (thesaban nakhon) Chiang Rai covers tambon Wiang and parts of Rop Wiang, San Sai, and Rim Kok. The township (thesaban tambon) San Sai covers parts of tambons San Sai, and Ban Du tambon Ban Du. There are a further 14 tambon administrative organizations (TAO).

No.	Subdistrict Name	Northern Thai Name	Thai Name	Villages	Houses	Population
1.	Wiang		เวียง	-	8,015	11,371
2.	Rop Wiang		รอบเวียง	7	25,300	48,930
3.	Ban Du		บ้านดู่	19	86,49	16,062
4.	Nang Lae		นางแล	14	4,309	10,271
5.	Mae Khao Tom		แม่ข้าวต้ม	23	4,596	11,916
6.	Mae Yao		แม่ยาว	18	7,634	17,746
7.	San Sai		สันทราย	11	4,863	9,469
8.	Mae Kon		แม่กรณ์	13	2,732	6,207
9.	Huai Chomphu		ห้วยชมภู	11	3,986	10,567
10.	Huai Sak		ห้วยสัก	30	6,844	17,235
11.	Rim Kok		ริมกก	11	8,132	17,383
12.	Doi Lan		ดอยลาน	20	3,761	10,452
13.	Pa O Don Chai		ป่าอ้อดอนชัย	21	4,107	10,049
14.	Tha Sai		ท่าสาย	13	4,017	8,736
15.	Doi Hang		ดอยฮาง	8	1,874	4,401
16.	Tha Sut		ท่าสุด	11	4,616	12,930
