= Chiang Rai province =

Province of Thailand

Chiang Rai เชียงราย ᨩ᩠ᨿᨦᩁᩣ᩠ᨿ
- Province
- จังหวัดเชียงราย · ᨧᩢ᩠ᨦᩉ᩠ᩅᩢᨯᨩ᩠ᨿᨦᩁᩣ᩠ᨿ

Other transcription(s)
  - Northern Thai: ᨧᩢ᩠ᨦᩉ᩠ᩅᩢᨯᨩ᩠ᨿᨦᩁᩣ᩠ᨿ
  - Chinese: 清萊 / 清莱 cêng1 lai5 (Teochew Peng'im); Qīnglái (Mandarin Chinese Pinyin)
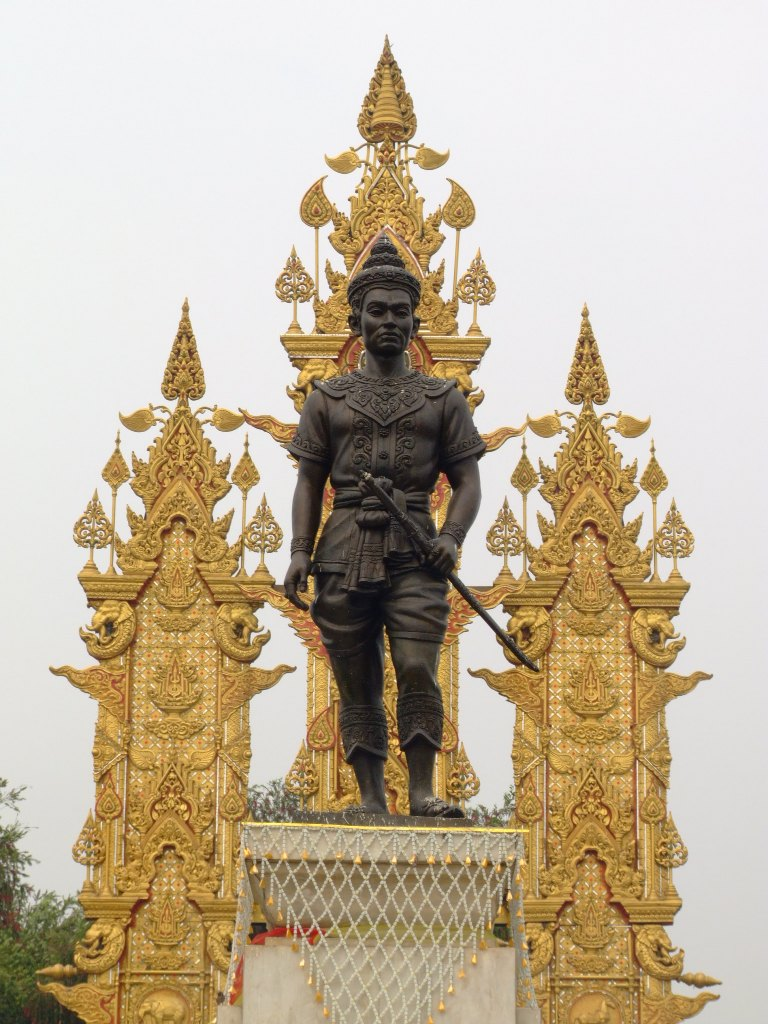
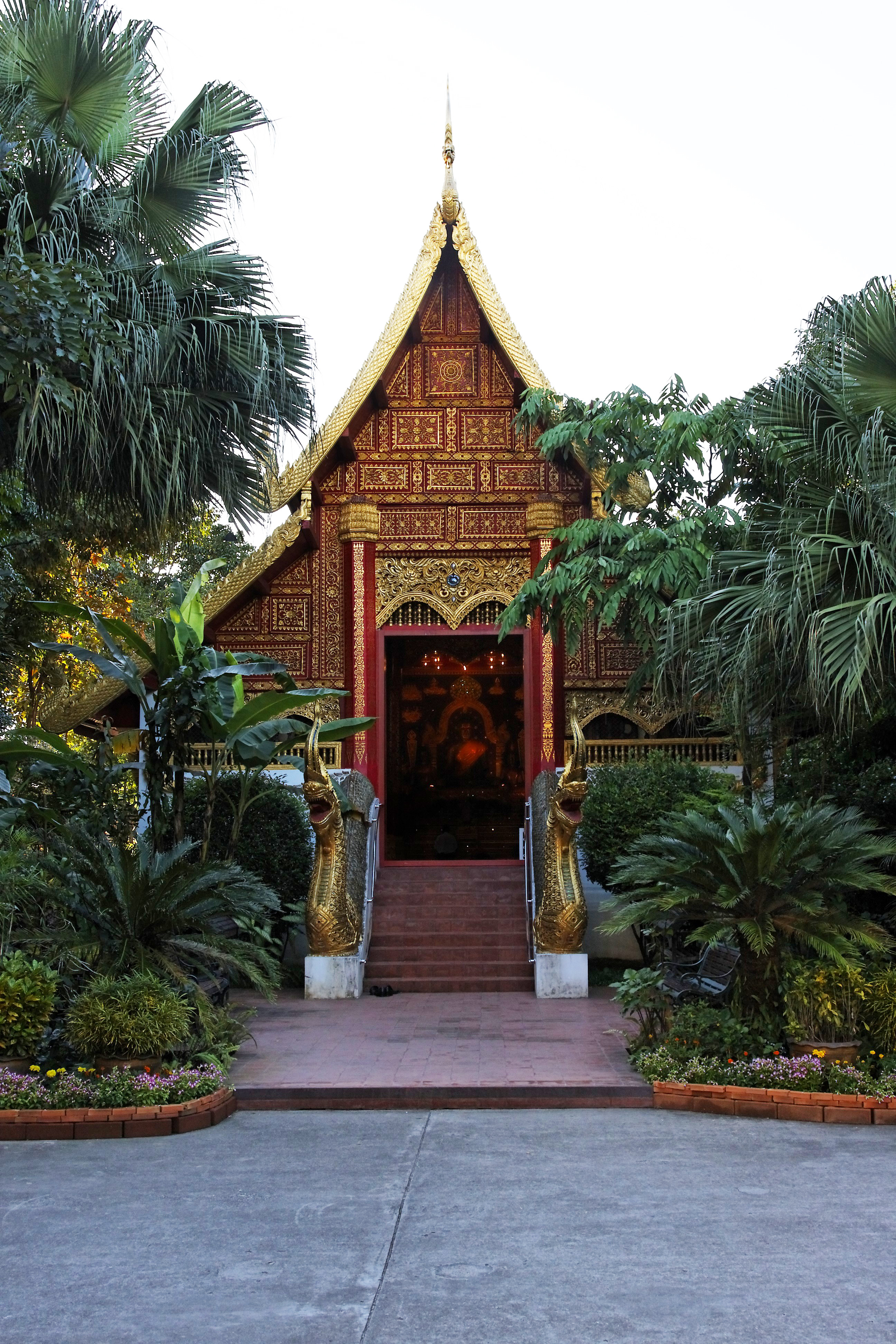
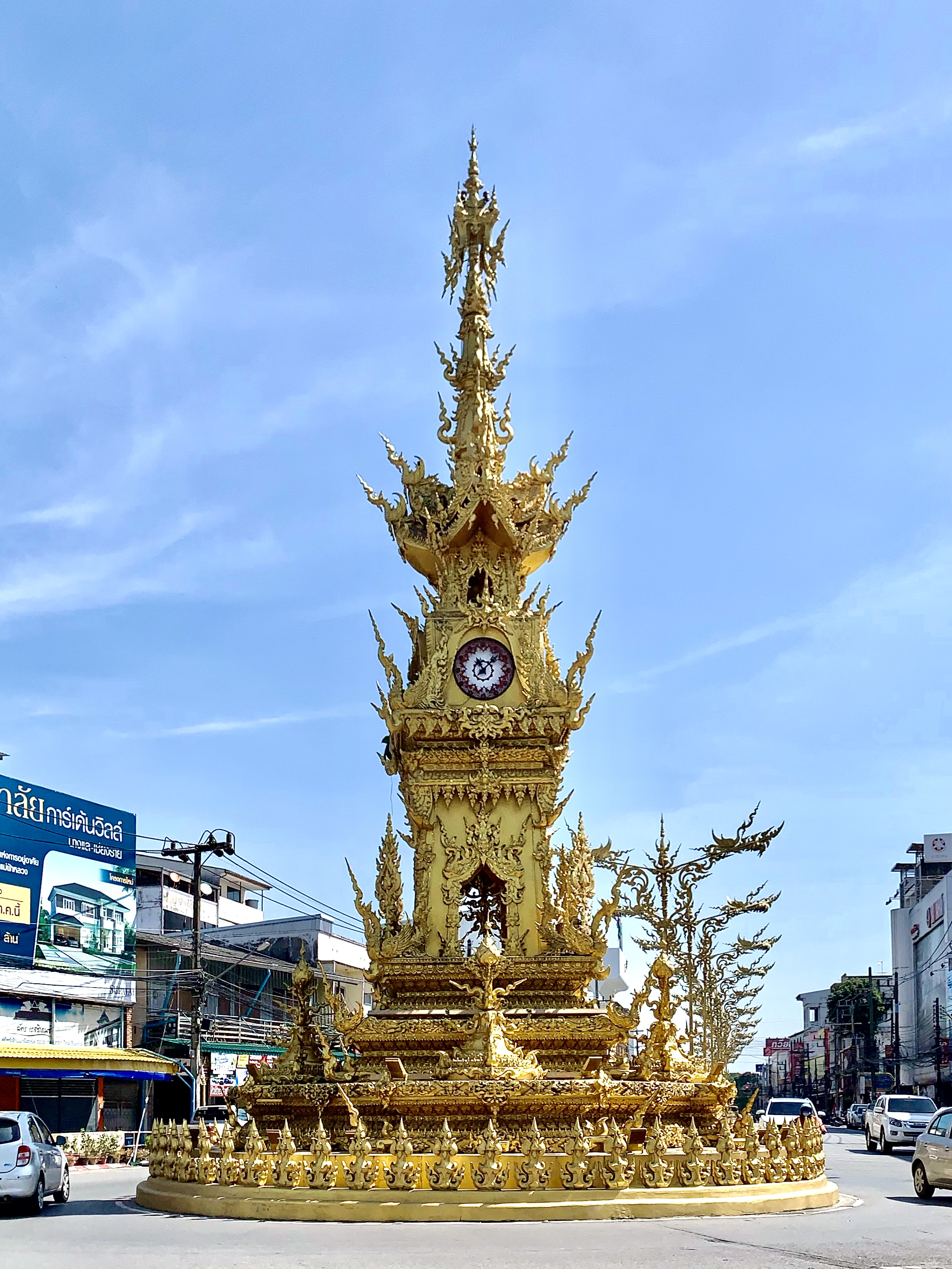
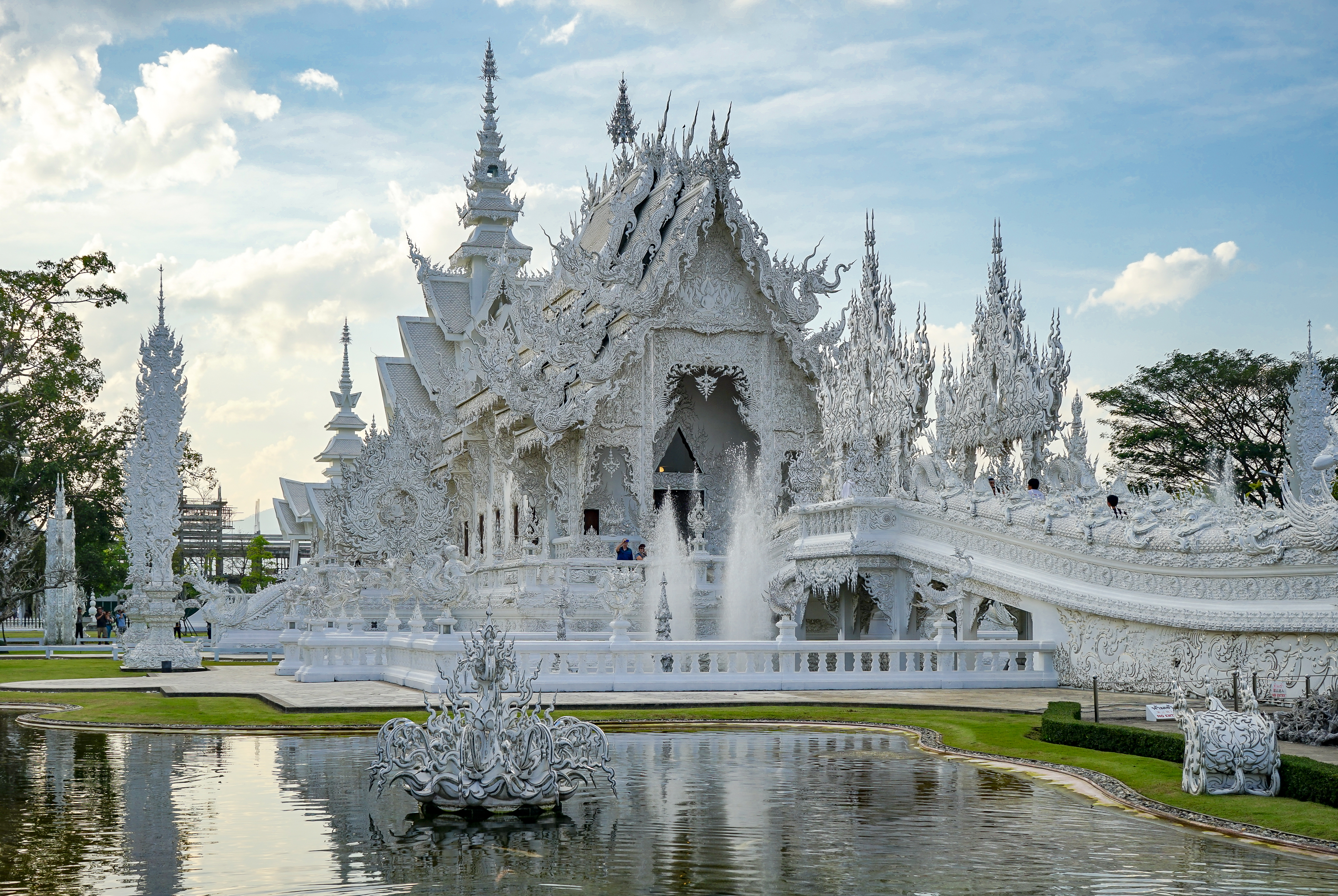
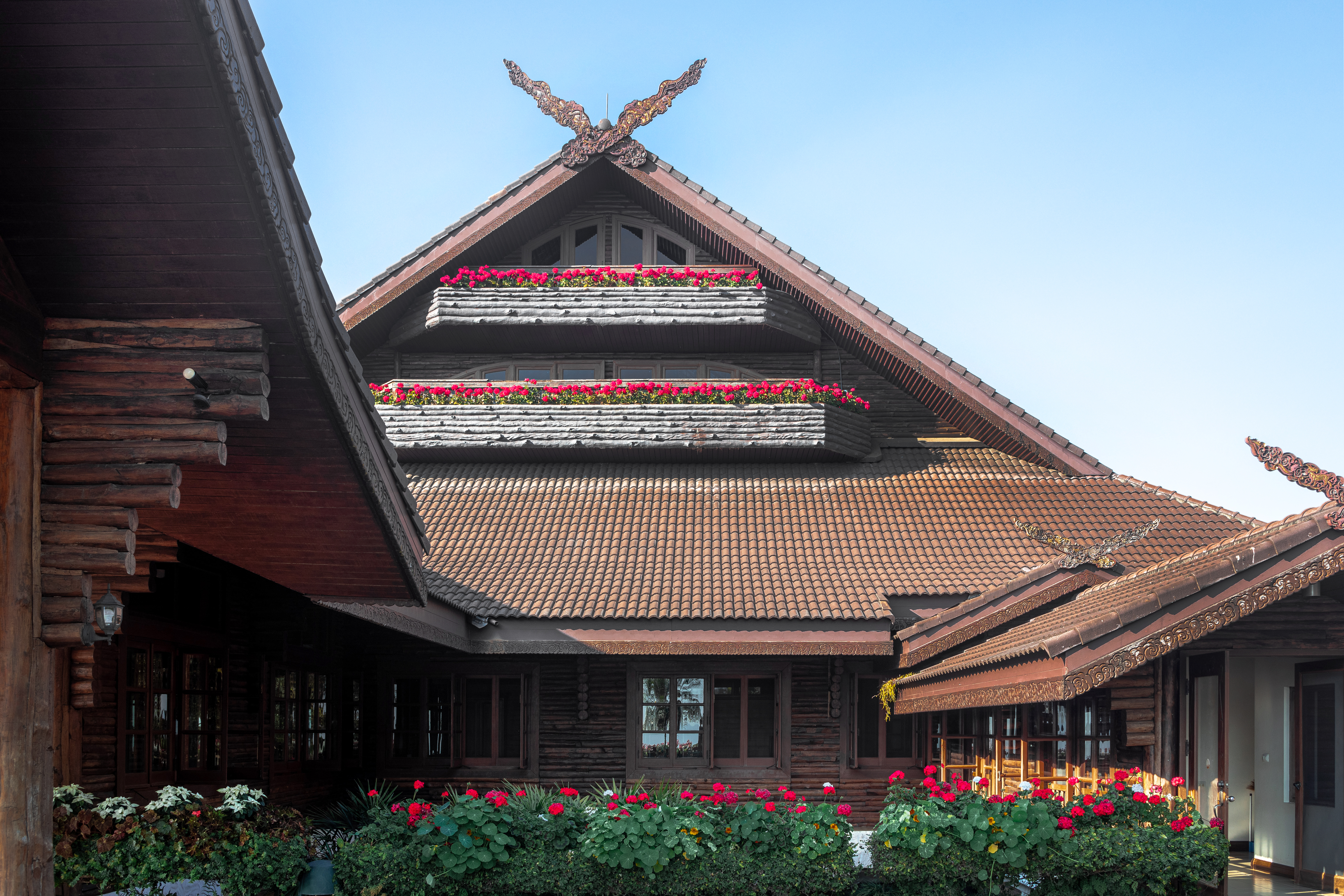
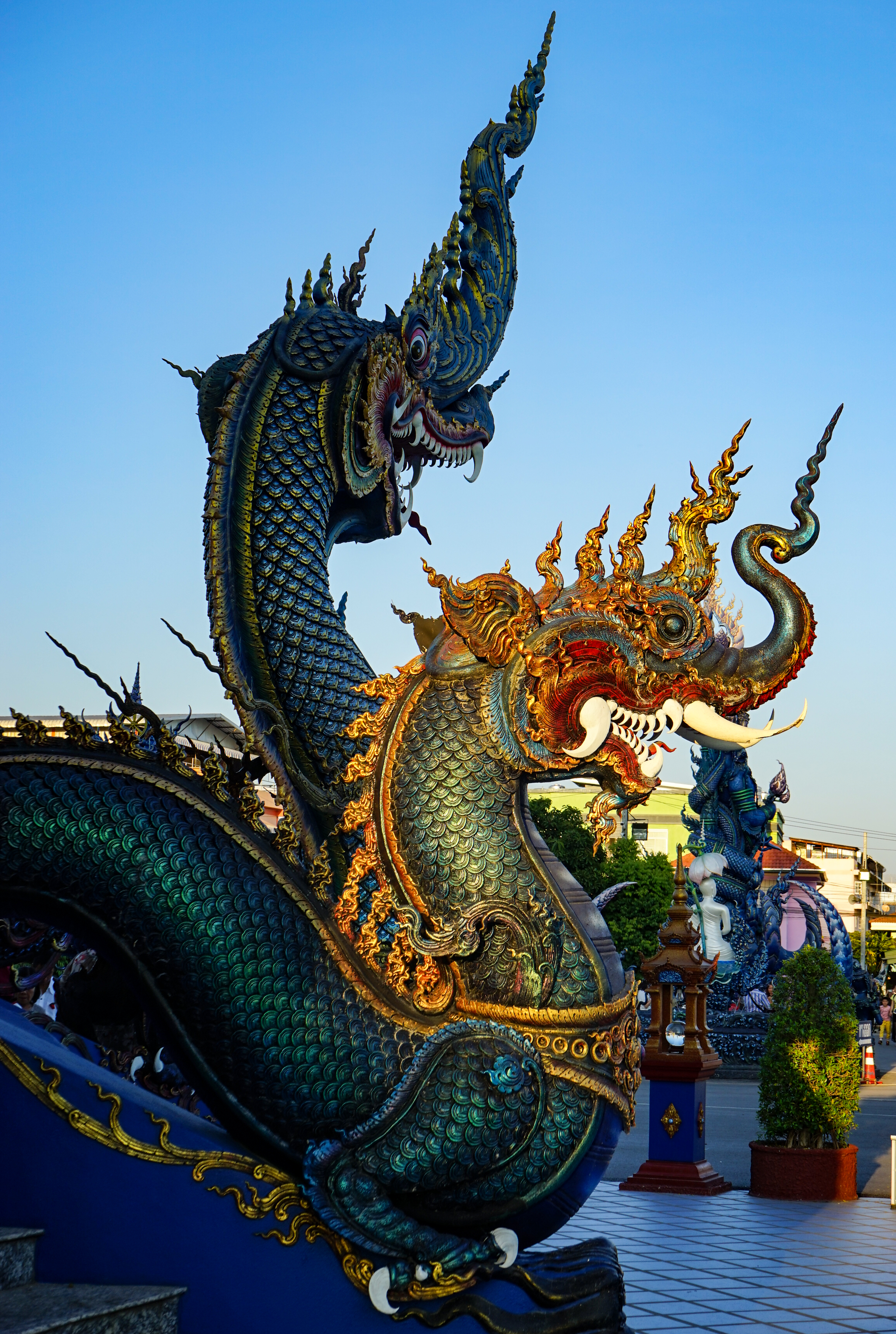
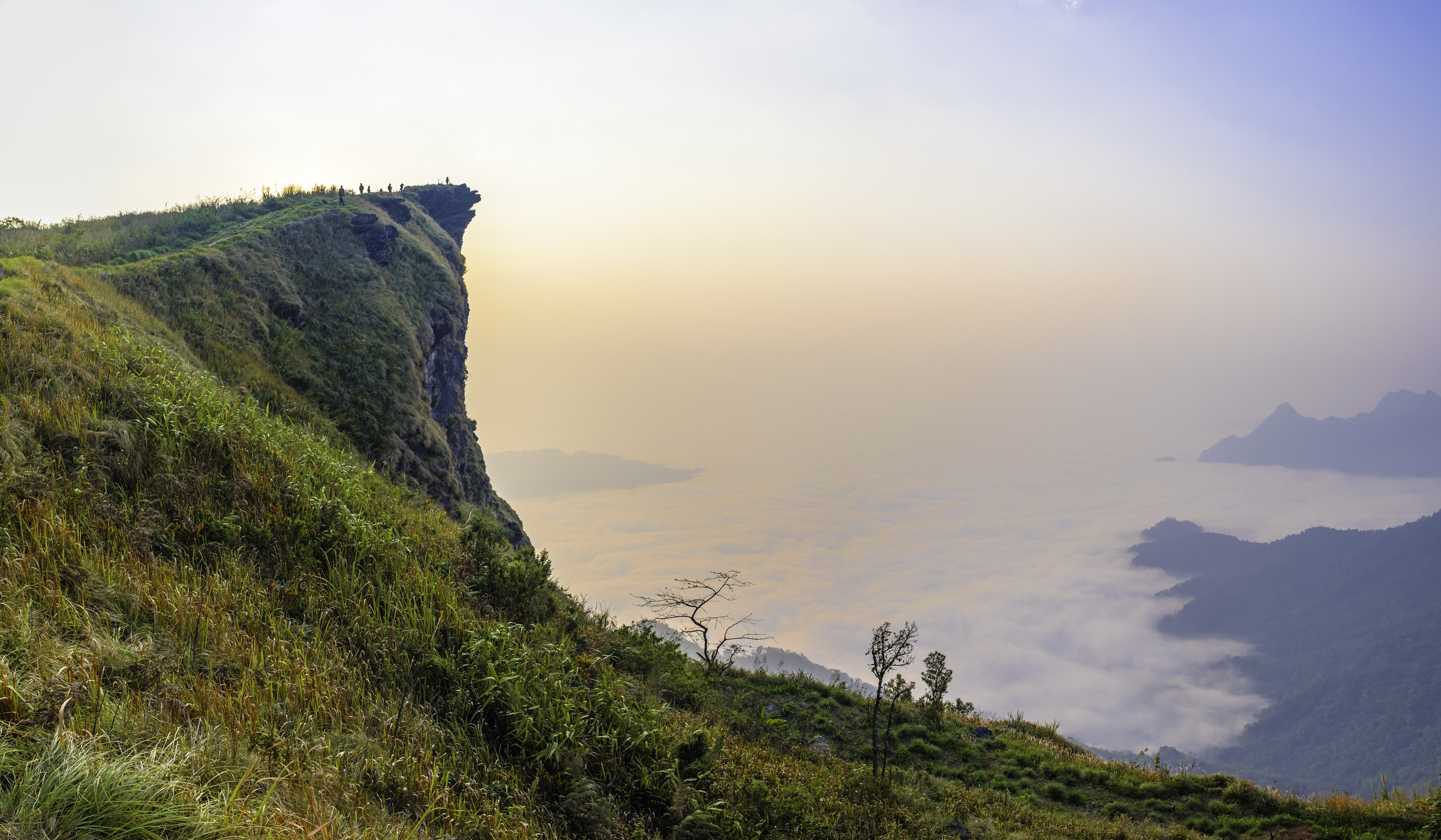
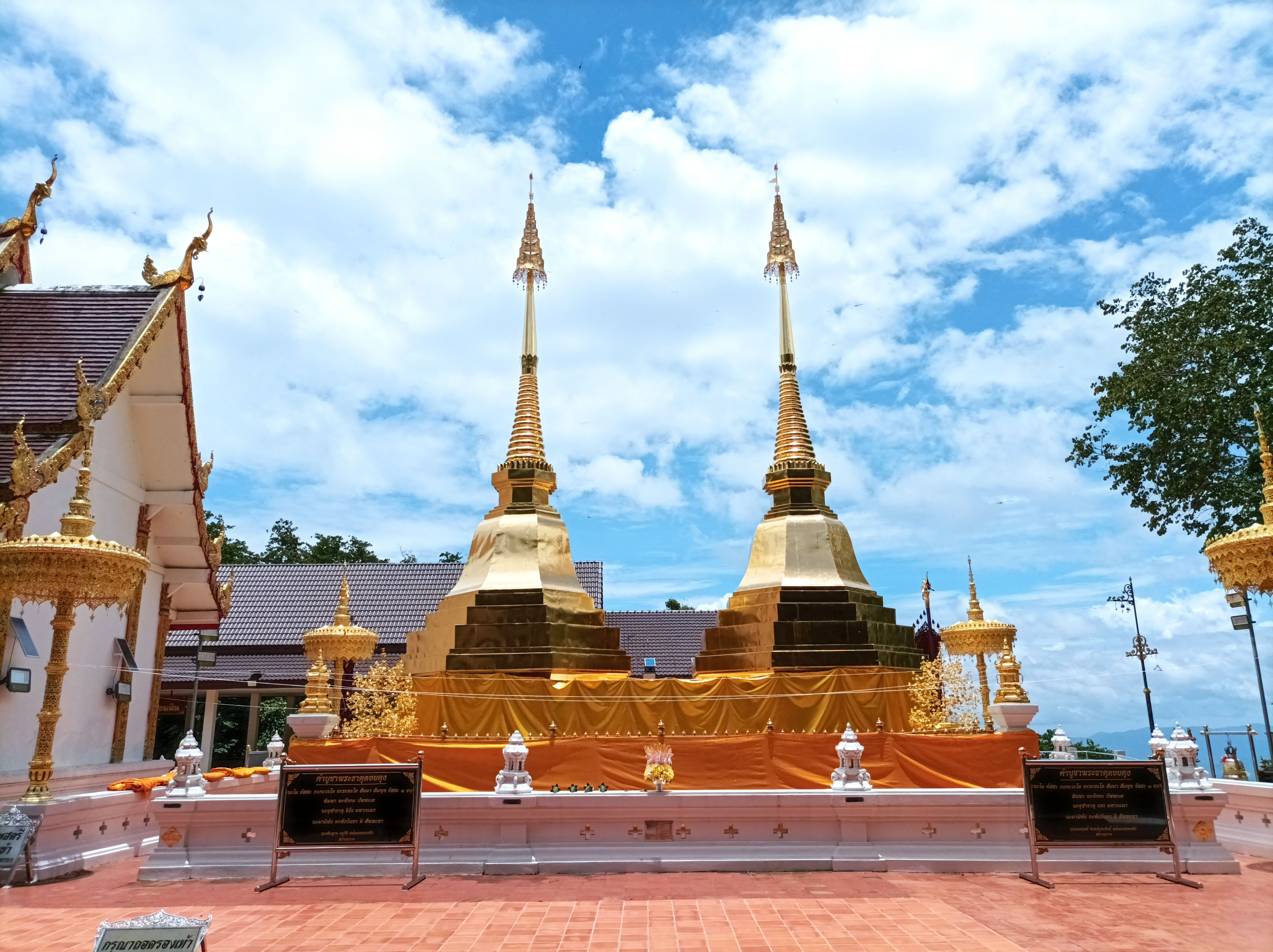
- Left to right, top to bottom: King Mangrai Intersection, Wat Phra Kaew, Chiang Rai Clock Tower, Wat Rong Khun, Doi Tung Royal Villa, Wat Rong Suea Ten, Phu Chi Fa, Wat Phra That Doi Tung

- Flag Seal
- Mottoes: "เหนือสุดในสยาม ชายแดนสามแผ่นดิน ถิ่นวัฒนธรรมล้านนา ล้ำค่าพระธาตุดอยตุง" ("Northernmost of Siam, Border of three nations, Home of Lan Na culture. The precious Wat Phra That Doi Tung.")
- Chiang Rai in Thailand
- Coordinates: 19°54′N 99°49′E
- Country: Thailand
- Capital: Chiang Rai

Government
  - Type: Province and Provincial Administrative Organization
  - Body: Chiang Rai Province and Chiang Rai Provincial Administrative Organization
  - Governor: Charin Thongsuk
  - PAO Chief Executive: Adithathorn Wanchaithanawong

Area
  - Total: 11,503 km^{2} (4,441 sq mi)
  - Rank: 12th

Population (2024)
  - Total: 1,297,657
  - Rank: 15th
  - Density: 113/km^{2} (290/sq mi)
  - Rank: 44th

Human Achievement Index
  - HAI (2022): 0.6307 "low" Ranked 52nd

GDP
  - Total: baht 104 billion (US$3.6 billion) (2019)
- Time zone: UTC+7 (ICT)
- Postal code: 57xxx
- Calling code: 052 & 053
- ISO 3166 code: TH-57
- Vehicle registration: เชียงราย
- Accession into Kingdom of Siam: 1910
- Accession into Kingdom of Thailand: 1932
- Website: chiangrai.go.th chiangraipao.go.th

Chiang Rai province
- "Chiang Rai" in Thai language (top) and Northern Thai with Tai Tham script (bottom)

Thai name
- Thai: เชียงราย
- RTGS: Chiang Rai

Northern Thai name
- Northern Thai: ᨩ᩠ᨿᨦᩁᩣ᩠ᨿ เจียงฮาย [tɕīaŋ hāːj]

Chiang Rai (Thai: เชียงราย, pronounced [tɕʰīaŋ rāːj]; Lanna: ᨩ᩠ᨿᨦᩁᩣ᩠ᨿ, pronounced [tɕīaŋ hāːj]) is one of Thailand's seventy-six provinces that lies in upper northern Thailand and is Thailand's northernmost province. It is bordered by the Shan State of Myanmar to the north, Bokeo province of Laos to the east, Phayao to the south, Lampang to the southwest, and Chiang Mai to the west. The province is linked to Houayxay, Laos by the Fourth Thai–Lao Friendship Bridge that spans the Mekong.

== Geography ==
The average elevation of the province is 580 metres (1,903 ft). The north of the province is part of the so-called Golden Triangle, where the borders of Thailand, Laos and Burma converge, an area which prior to the rise of agricultural production of coffee, pineapple, coconuts, and banana plantations, was unsafe because of drug smuggling across the borders. The Mekong River forms the boundary with Laos, the Mae Sai and Ruak River with Burma. Through the town of Chiang Rai itself, flows the "Mae Kok" Kok River and south of it the Lao River, a tributary of the Kok.

While the eastern part of the province is characterized by relatively flat river plains, the northern and western part consists of the hilly terrain of the Thai highlands with the Khun Tan Range and the Phi Pan Nam Range in the west and the Daen Lao Range in the north. While not the highest elevation of the province, the 1,389-metre (4,557 ft) high Doi Tung (Flag Hill) is the most important terrain feature. Wat Phra That Doi Chom Thong wat on top of the hill, according to the chronicles, dates back to the year 911. Nearby is Doi Tung Royal Villa, former residence of the late princess mother Somdej Phra Srinagarindra (mother of King Rama IX). Thanks to her activities the hills were reforested, and the hill tribes diverted from growing opium poppies to other crops including coffee, bananas, coconuts, and pineapples. The total forest area is 4,585 km^{2} (1,770 sq mi) or 39.9 percent of provincial area.

=== National parks ===
There are eight national parks, of which seven in region 15 (Chiang Rai) and Doi Wiang Pha in region 16 (Chiang Mai), they are the protected areas in Chiang Rai province. (Visitors in fiscal year 2024)

Doi Luang National Park	1,169 km^{2} (451 sq mi)	(29,179)
Lam Nam Kok National Park	587 km^{2} (227 sq mi)	(86,787)
Mae Puem National Park	351 km^{2} (136 sq mi)	(35,626)
Doi Wiang Pha National Park	303 km^{2} (117 sq mi)	(939)
Phu Sang National Park	285 km^{2} (110 sq mi)	(66,868)
Khun Chae National Park	270 km^{2} (100 sq mi)	(3,878)
Phu Chi Fa National Park	93 km^{2} (36 sq mi)	(129,011)
Tham Luang–Khun Nam	19 km^{2} (7.3 sq mi)	(258,358)
Nang Non National Park

=== Wildlife Sanctuaries ===
The two wildlife sanctuaries in region 15 (Chiang Rai) are not in Chiang Rai province.

=== Location protected areas ===
Overview of protected areas of Chiang Rai

Chiang Rai protected areas

	National park
1	Doi Luang
2	Doi Wiang Pha
3	Khun Chae
4	Lam Nam Kok
5	Mae Puem
6	Phu Chi Fa
7	Phu Sang
8	Tham Luang-Khun Nam Nang Non

== History ==
Chiang Rai was founded in 1262. Populations have dwelled in Chiang Rai since the 7th century and it became the center of the Lanna Kingdom during the 13th century. The region, rich in natural resources, was occupied by the Burmese until 1786.

Chiang Rai province's golden triangle bordering Laos and Burma was once the hub of opium production.

Chiang Rai became a province in 1910, after being part of the Lanna Kingdom for centuries. After Lanna was incorporated into Thailand, it remained an autonomous region and thus the Chiang Rai area was administered from Chiang Mai.

Chiang Rai province is a transit point for Rohingya refugees from Myanmar (Burma) who are transported there from Sangkhlaburi district in Kanchanaburi province.

In September 2024, there was a major flood in Chiang Rai province, affecting six districts. It was the most severe flood in 50 years.

== Demographics ==
The majority of the population are ethnic Thai who speak Kham Muang among themselves, but 12.5% are of hill tribes origin, a sizeable minority in the north provinces. A smaller number are of Chinese descent, mainly descendants of the Kuomintang soldiers who settled in the region, notably in Santikhiri.

== Ethnic groups ==
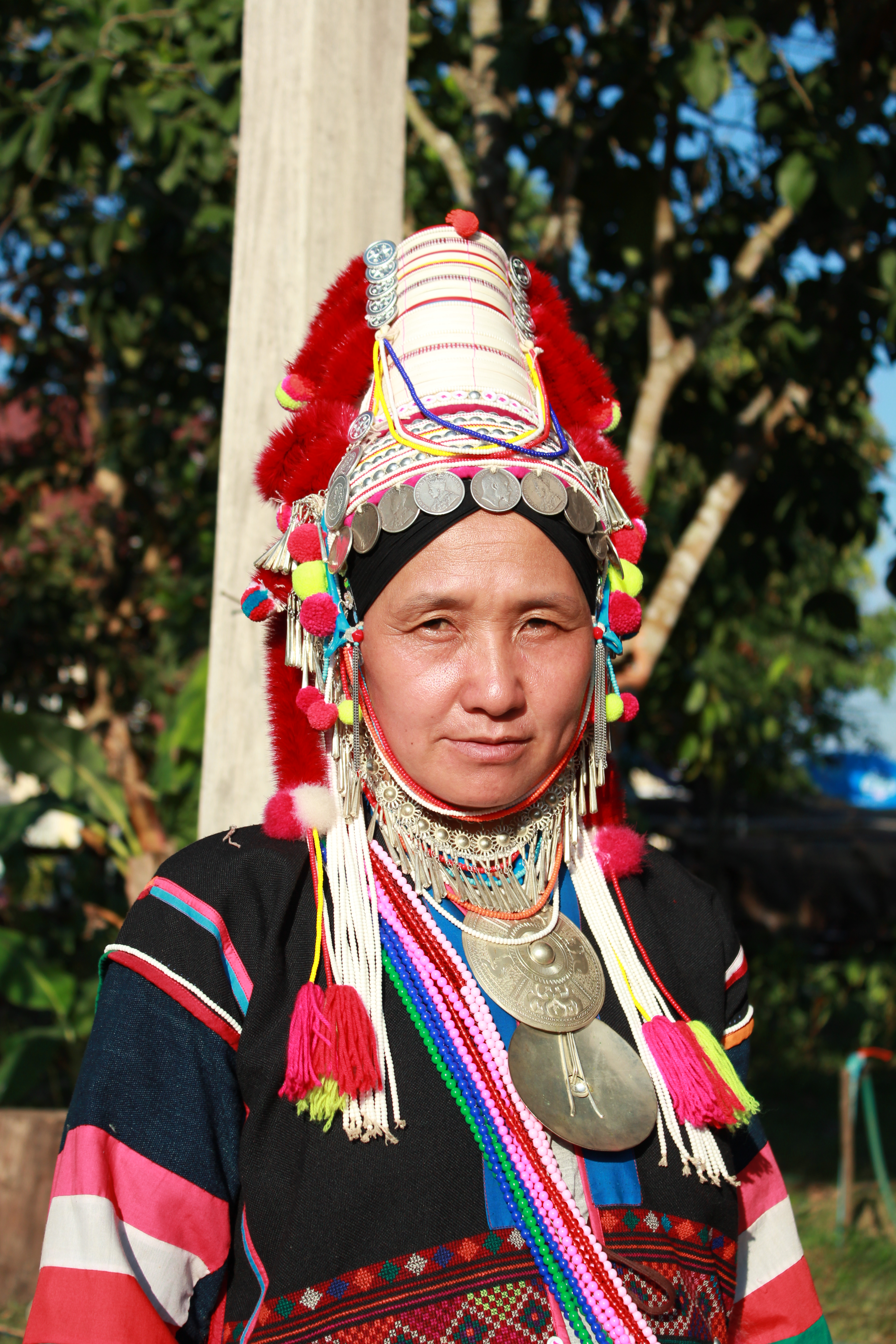
Akha people

Khon Muang are the city folk who originally came from Chiang Mai, Lamphun, Lampang, and Phrae. Culturally, they design their houses having only one floor with wooden gable decorations called "ka-lae". They are known for their craftsmanship in wood carving, weaving, lacquer ware, and musical instruments.

Tai Yai (ไทใหญ่) (Shan) are a Tai ethnic group who primarily live in what is now Shan State in Burma, and also in Mae Hong Son province in Thailand. They grow rice, farm, raise cattle, and trade. Their craftsmanship lies in weaving, pottery, wood carving, and bronze ware.

Akha have the largest population of any hill tribe in the region. Originating from Tibet and southern China, they dwell on high ground around 1,200 meters above sea level. Within their villages they build spirit gateways to protect them from evil spirits.

Lahu (Musor) are also from the Yunnanese area and live in high areas. They are known as hunters and planters. Karen live in various areas of the region which have valleys and riverbanks.

Chin Haw in Chiang Rai consist primarily of the former Kuomintang (KMT army) who took refuge in the area, mainly in Santikhiri (formerly Mae Salong).

Hmong from southern China, inhabit high ground. They raise livestock and grow rice, corn, tobacco, and cabbage. They are also known for their embroidery and silver.

Tai Lue (Dai) live in dwellings of usually only a single room wooden house built on high poles. They are skilled in weaving.

Lisu from southern China and Tibet are renowned for their colorful dress and also build their dwellings on high stilts. They harvest rice and corn and their men are skilled in hunting.

Yao (Mien) reside along mountain sides and grow corn and other crops. They are skilled blacksmiths, silversmiths, and embroiders.

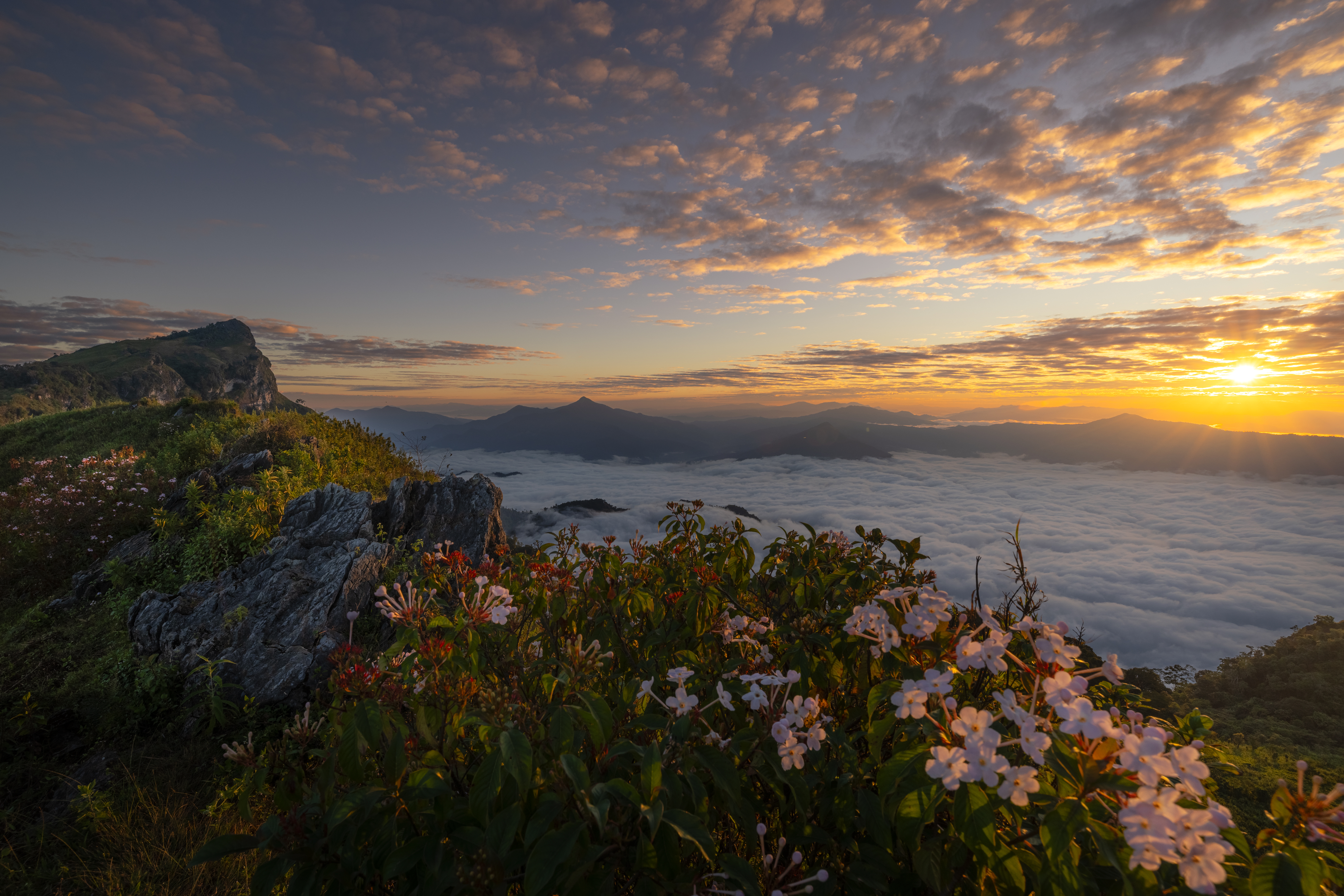
Phu Chi Fa National park

== Symbols ==
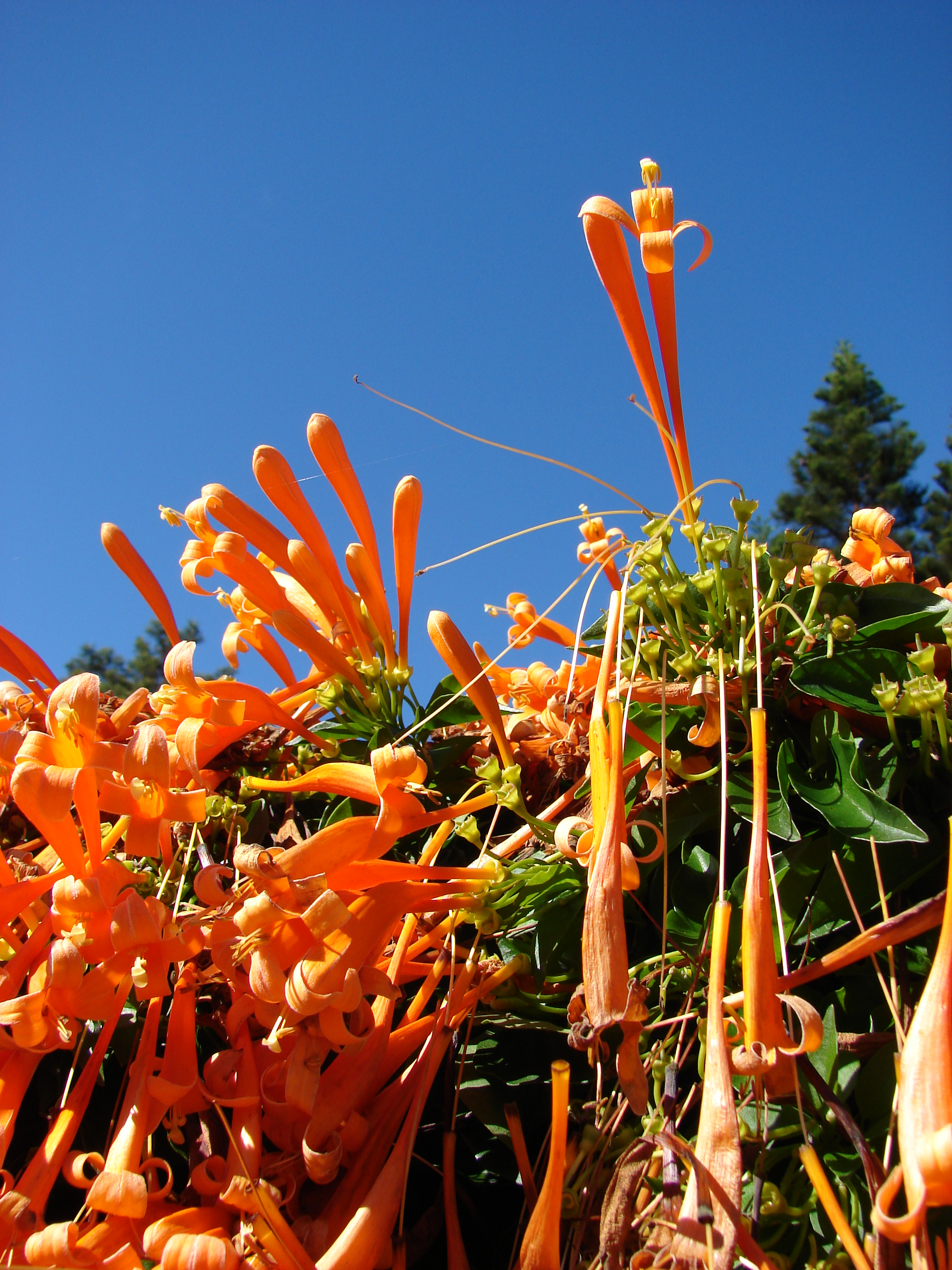
Orange trumpet

The seal of the province shows a white elephant, the royal symbol, recalling that Chiang Rai was founded by King Mengrai, according to legend because his elephant liked the place.

The provincial tree is the tree jasmine (Radermachera ignea), and the provincial flower is the orange trumpet (Pyrostegia venusta). The giant catfish (Pangasianodon gigas) is the provincial aquatic life.

The former provincial slogan was "เหนือสุดในสยาม อร่ามดอยตุง ผดุงวัฒนธรรม รสล้ำข้าวสาร หอมหวานลิ้นจี่ สตรีโสภา ชาเลิศรส สัปปะรดนางแล", 'Northernmost of Siam, beautiful Doi Tung, repository of culture, most delicious rice, sweet and fragrant lychee, beautiful women, the finest flavoured tea, pineapple from Nang Lae, source of the giant catfish".

The current slogan is "เหนือสุดในสยาม ชายแดนสามแผ่นดิน ถิ่นวัฒนธรรมล้านนา ล้ำค่าพระธาตุดอยตุง", 'Northernmost of Siam, frontier of three lands, the home of Lan Na culture and Doi Tung Temple'.

== Hospitals ==
- Kasemrad Sriburin General Hospital, Private hospital.
- Chiangrai Prachanukroh Hospital, Public hospital.

== Transport ==
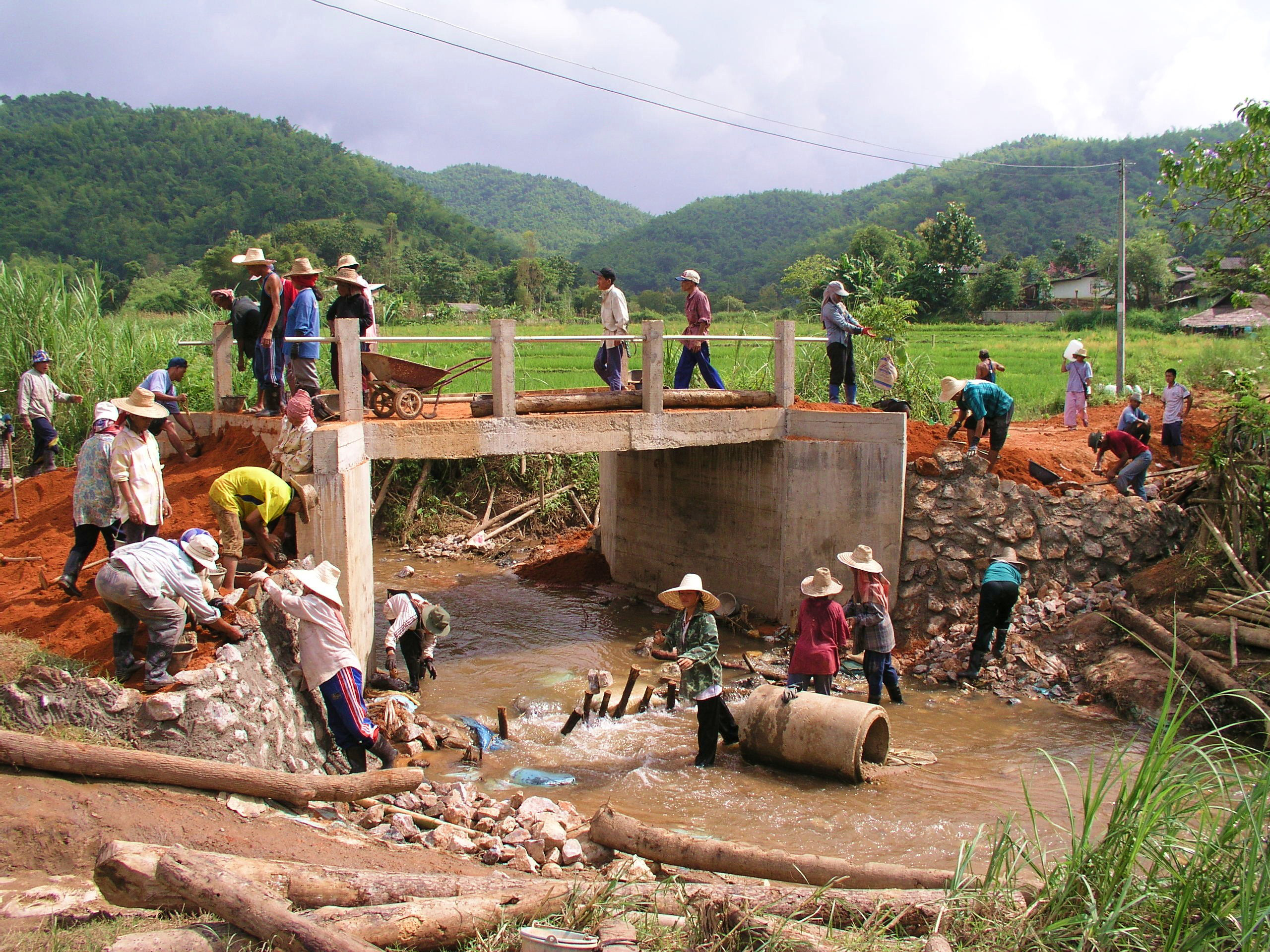
Construction of a reinforced concrete bridge, Chiang Rai province (2009)

=== Air ===
Chiang Rai International Airport has domestic flights to both Bangkok airports, which connect to regional and international flights.

=== Boat ===
There is daily boat service between Chiang Rai and Tha Ton.

=== Rail ===
There is no railway system in Chiang Rai. The nearest station is Chiang Mai Railway Station.

=== Road ===
Chiang Rai province is intersected by Asian Highway 2, which runs for over 13,000 kilometres (8,100 mi) from Denpasar in Indonesia to Kosravi in Iran, and by Asian Highway 3, which runs for over 7,000 km (4,300 mi) from Kentung in Myanmar to Ulan-Ude in Russia.

Decent bus services are available in the province. In more remote areas, songthaews are the norm.

== Administrative divisions ==
Map of eighteen districts

=== Provincial government ===
Chiang Rai is divided into 18 districts (amphoes). The districts are further divided into 124 sub-districts (tambons) and 1,751 villages (mubans).

- 1. Mueang Chiang Rai
- 2. Wiang Chai
- 3. Chiang Khong
- 4. Thoeng
- 5. Phan
- 6. Pa Daet
- 7. Mae Chan
- 8. Chiang Saen
- 9. Mae Sai
- 10. Mae Suai
- 11. Wiang Pa Pao
- 12. Phaya Mengrai
- 13. Wiang Kaen
- 14. Khun Tan
- 15. Mae Fa Luang
- 16. Mae Lao
- 17. Wiang Chiang Rung
- 18. Doi Luang

=== Local government ===
As of 26 November 2019 there are: one Chiang Rai Provincial Administration Organisation (ongkan borihan suan changwat) and 73 municipal (thesaban) areas in the province. Chiang Rai has city (thesaban nakhon) status. Further 72 subdistrict municipalities (thesaban tambon). The non-municipal areas are administered by 70 Subdistrict Administrative Organisations - SAO (ongkan borihan suan tambon).

== Human achievement index 2022 ==
Health	Education	Employment	Income
61	71	53	19
Housing	Family	Transport	Participation
42	37	45	20
Province Chiang Rai, with an HAI 2022 value of 0.6307 is "somewhat low", occupies place 52 in the ranking.

Since 2003, United Nations Development Programme (UNDP) in Thailand has tracked progress on human development at sub-national level using the Human achievement index (HAI), a composite index covering all the eight key areas of human development. National Economic and Social Development Board (NESDB) has taken over this task since 2017.

Rank	Classification
1–13	"High"
14–29	"Somewhat high"
30–45	"Average"
46–61	"Somewhat low"
62–77	"Low"

Map with provinces and HAI 2022 rankings

== Gallery ==
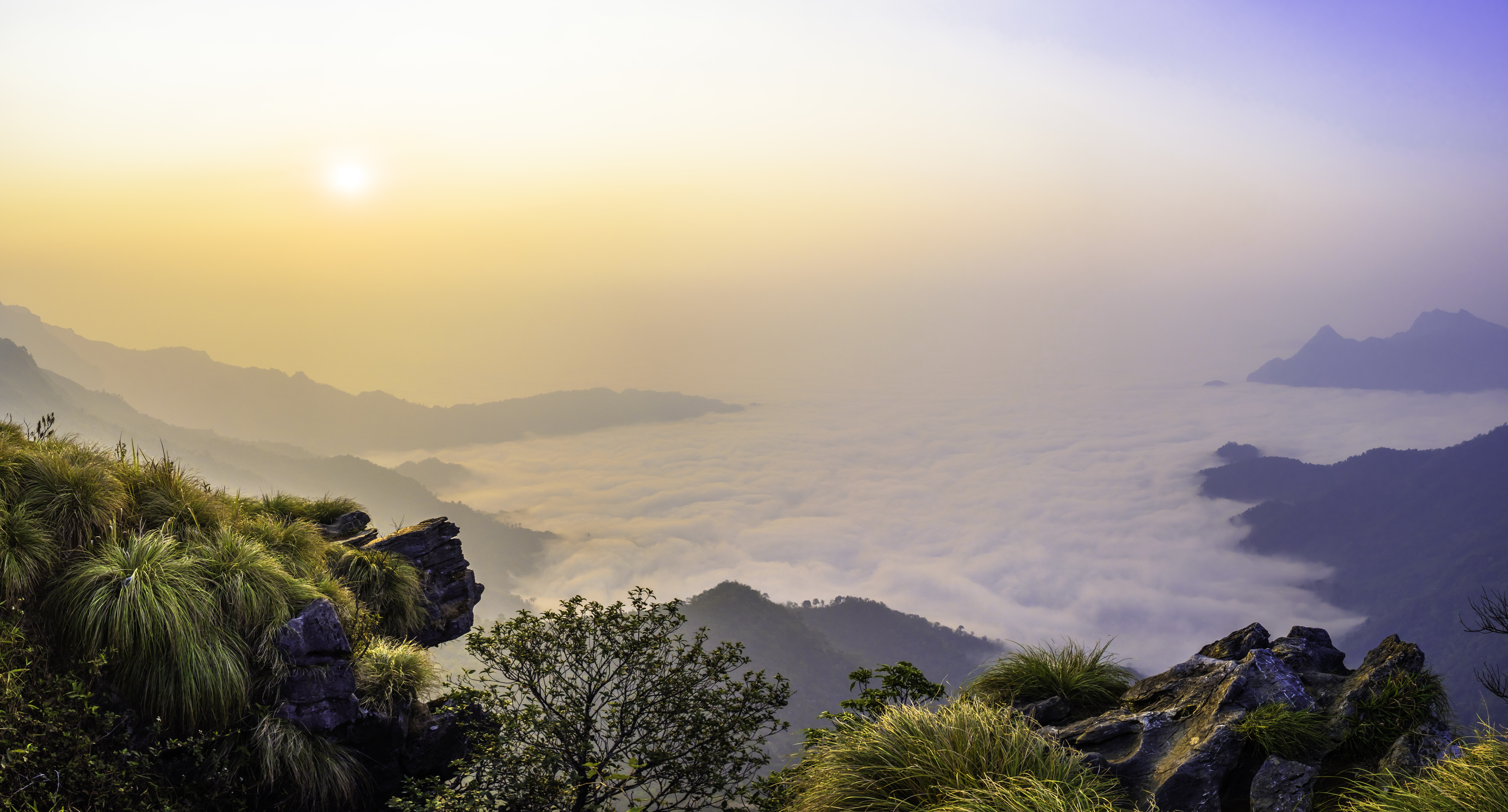
Phu Chi Fa

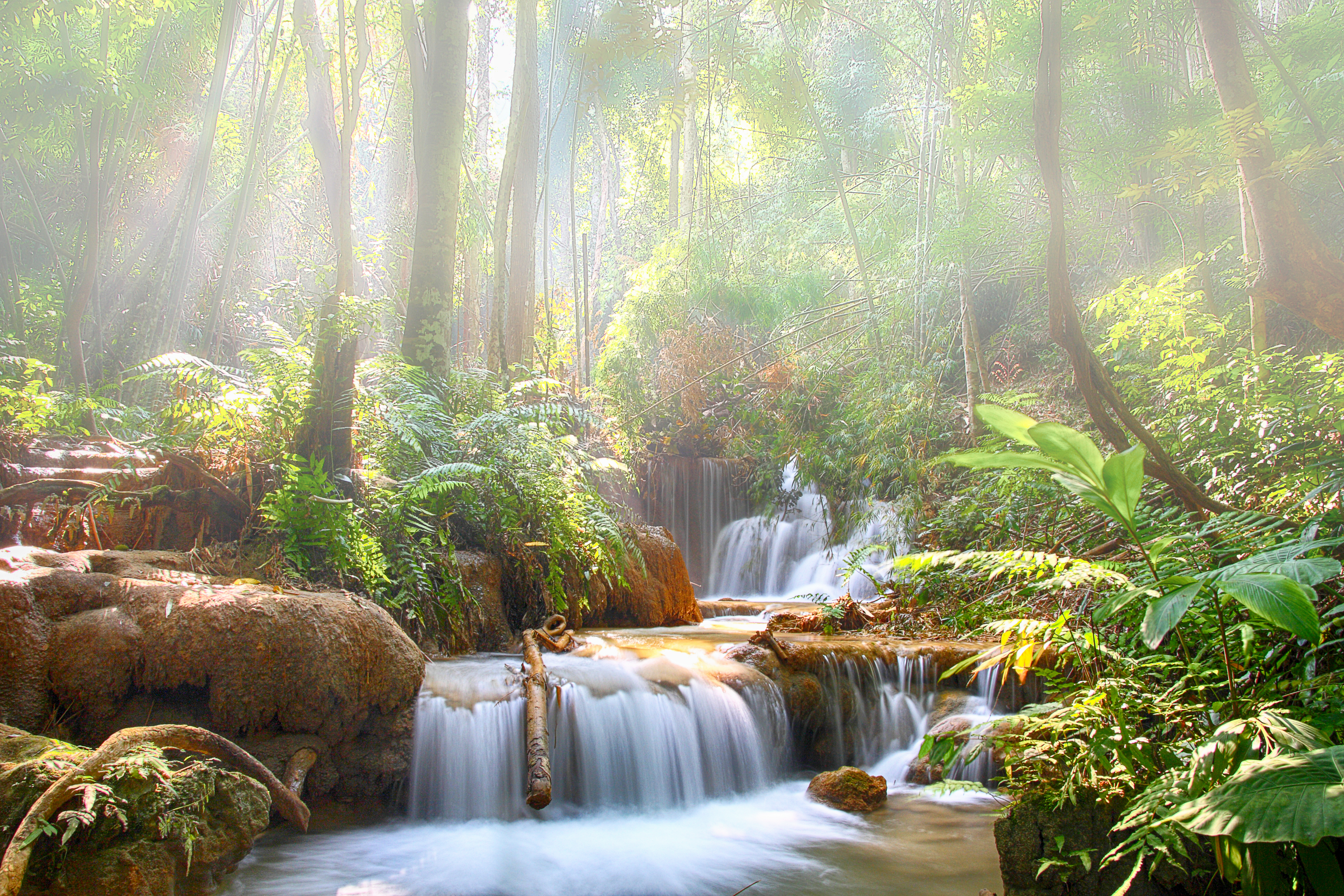
Pu Kaeng Waterfall, Doi Luang National Park

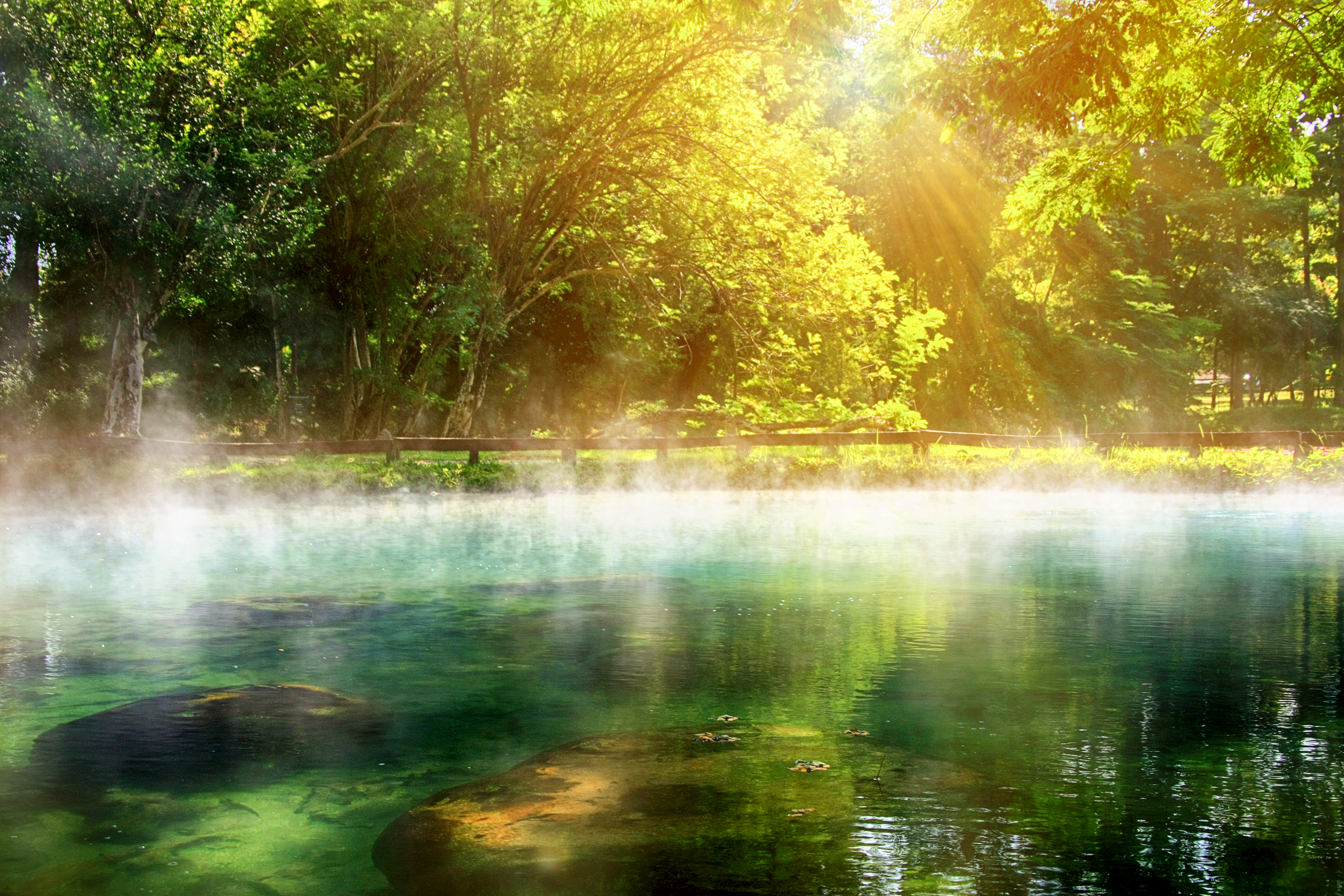
Huai Mak Liam Hot Spring, Lam Nam Kok National Park

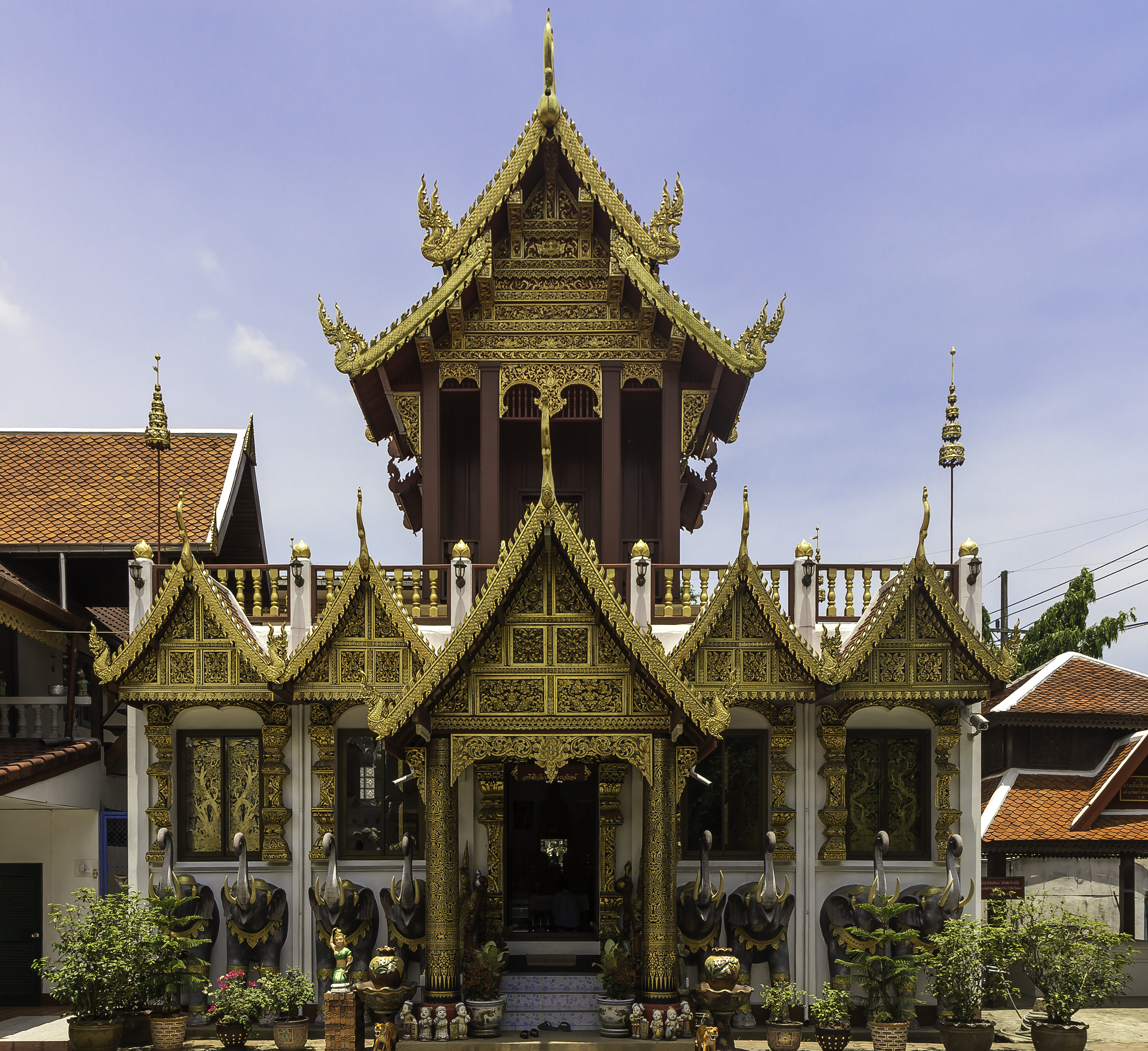
Wat Klang Wiang

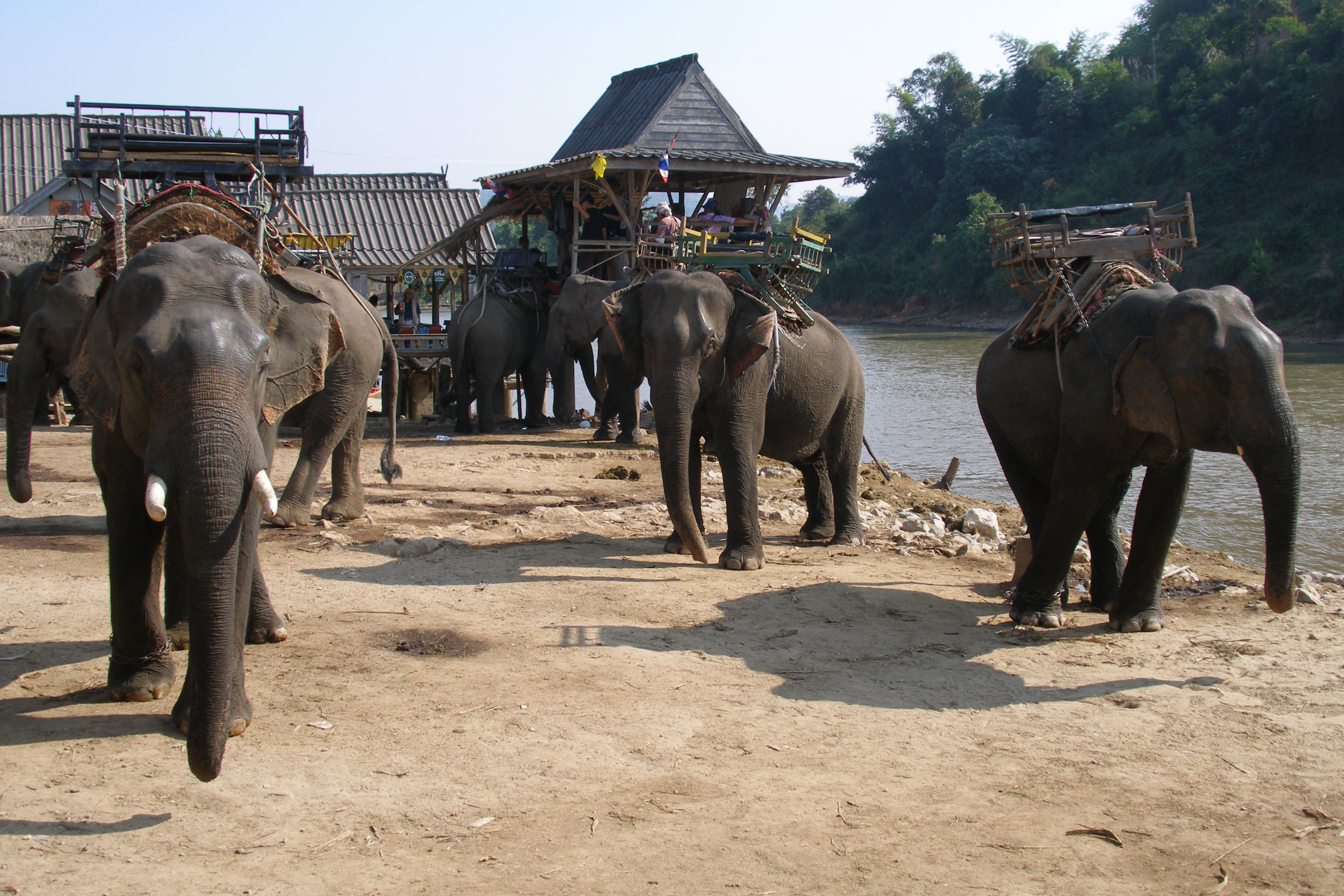
Elephants, Kok River

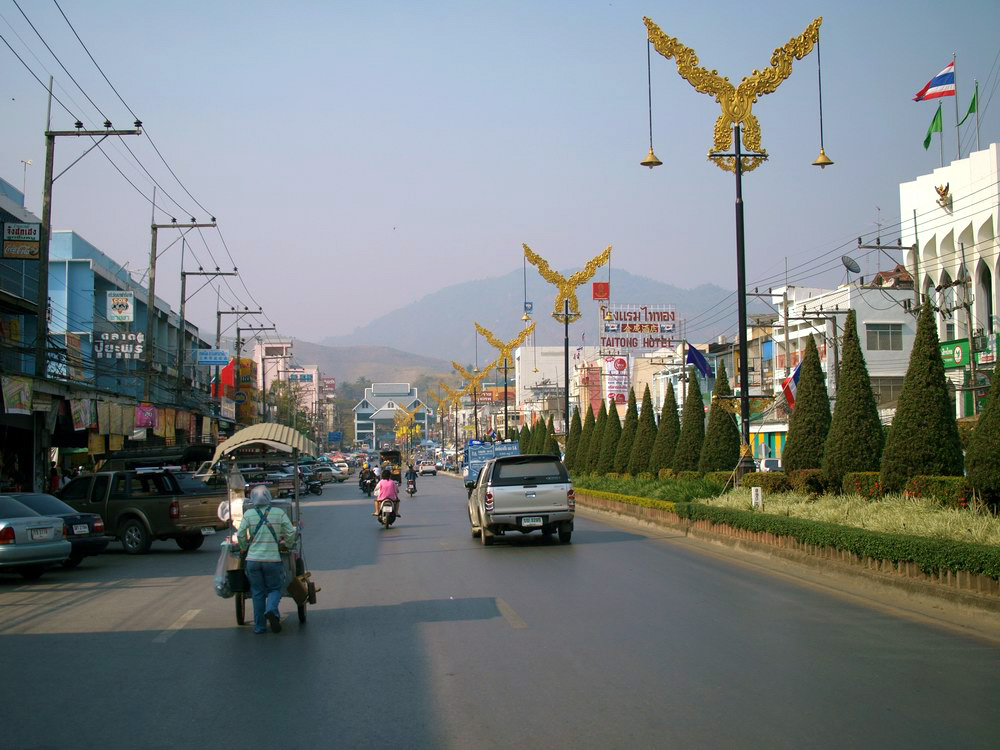
Mae Sai city

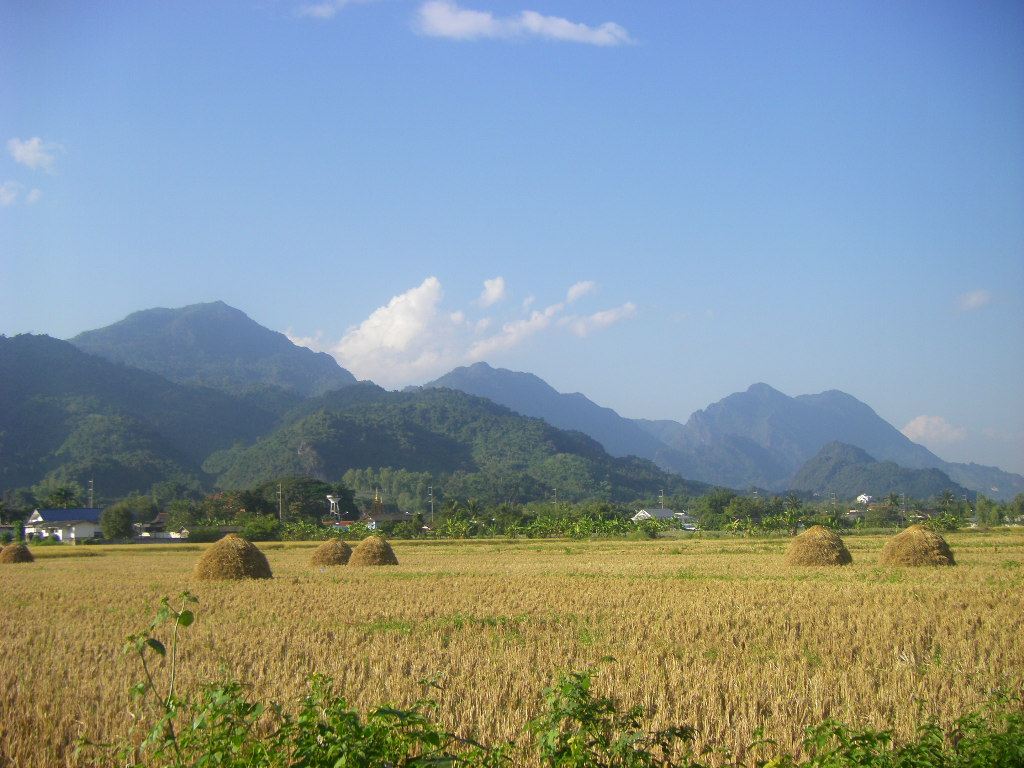
Doi Nang Non

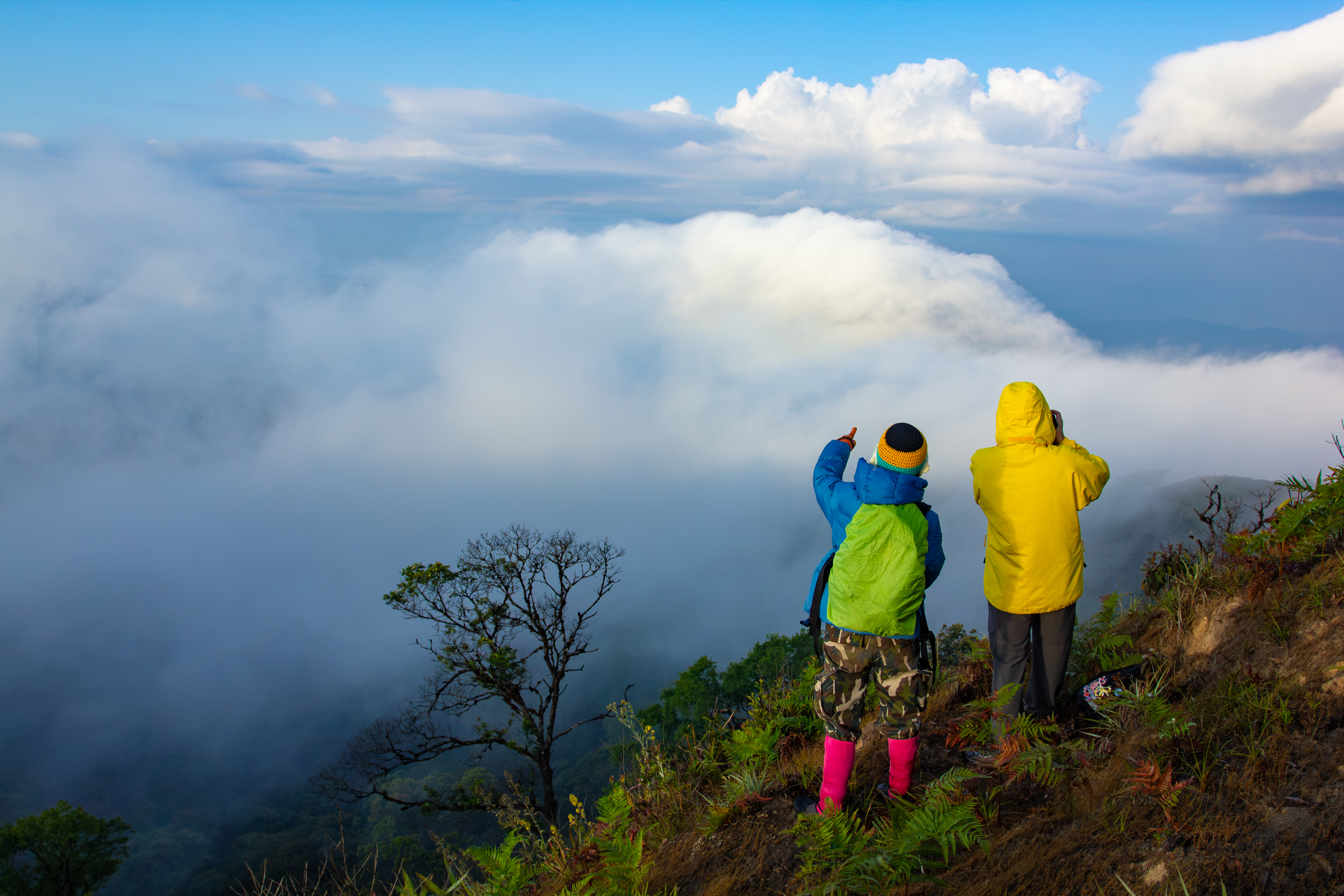
Khun Chae National Park

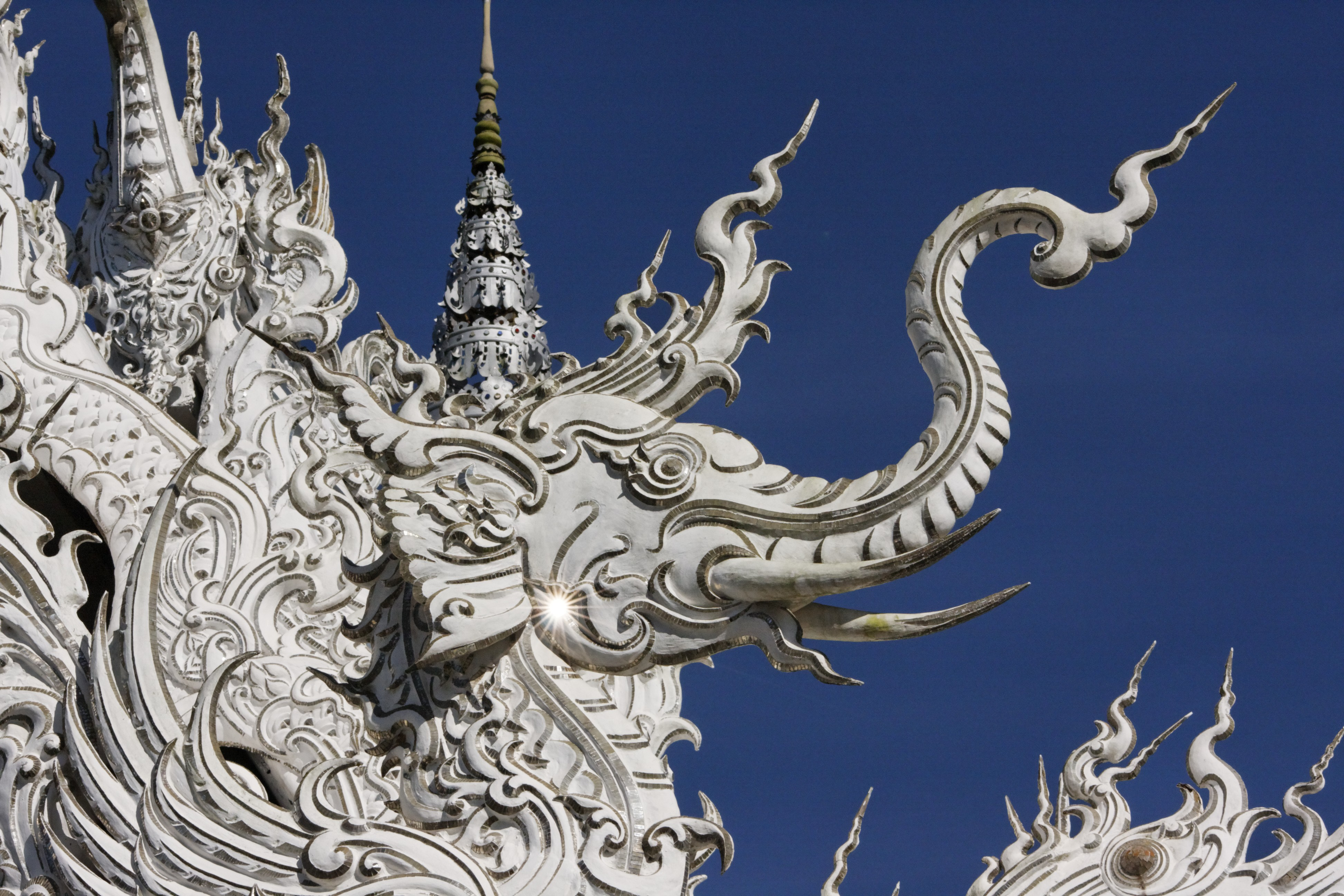
Wat Rong Khun

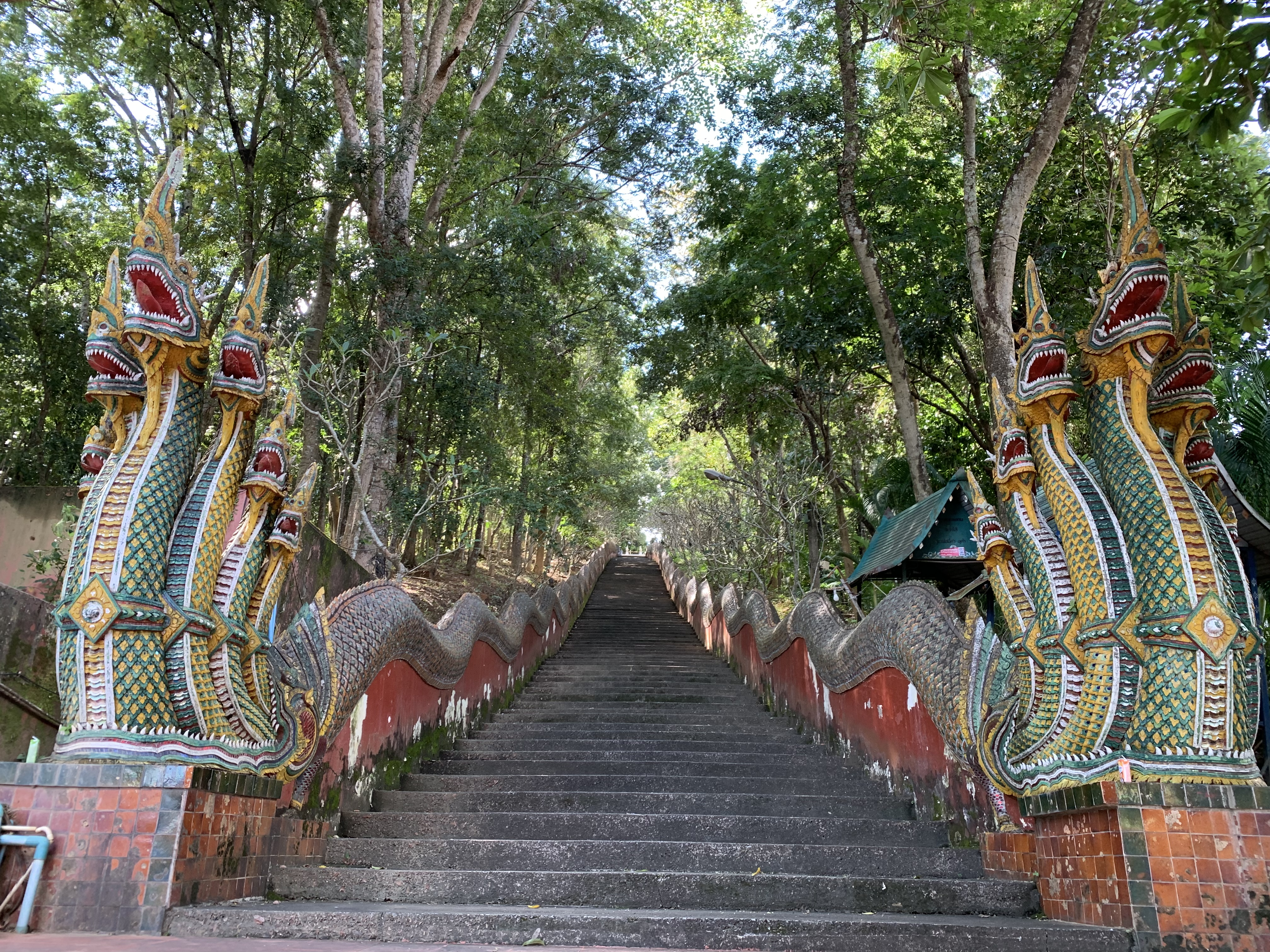
Wat Phra Dhatu Doi Wao

== Religion ==
Religion in Chiang Rai
1. Buddhism (90.8%)
2. Christianity (8.82%)
3. Islam (0.27%)
4. Hinduism (0.04%)
5. Confucianism (0.02%)
6. Sikhism (0.10%)
7. Not Religious (0.20%)
8. Unknown (0.01%)
9. Other (0.01%)
