= Navel City Pillar of Chiang Rai =

City pillar in Thailand

Coordinates: 19°54.90′N 99°49.365′E

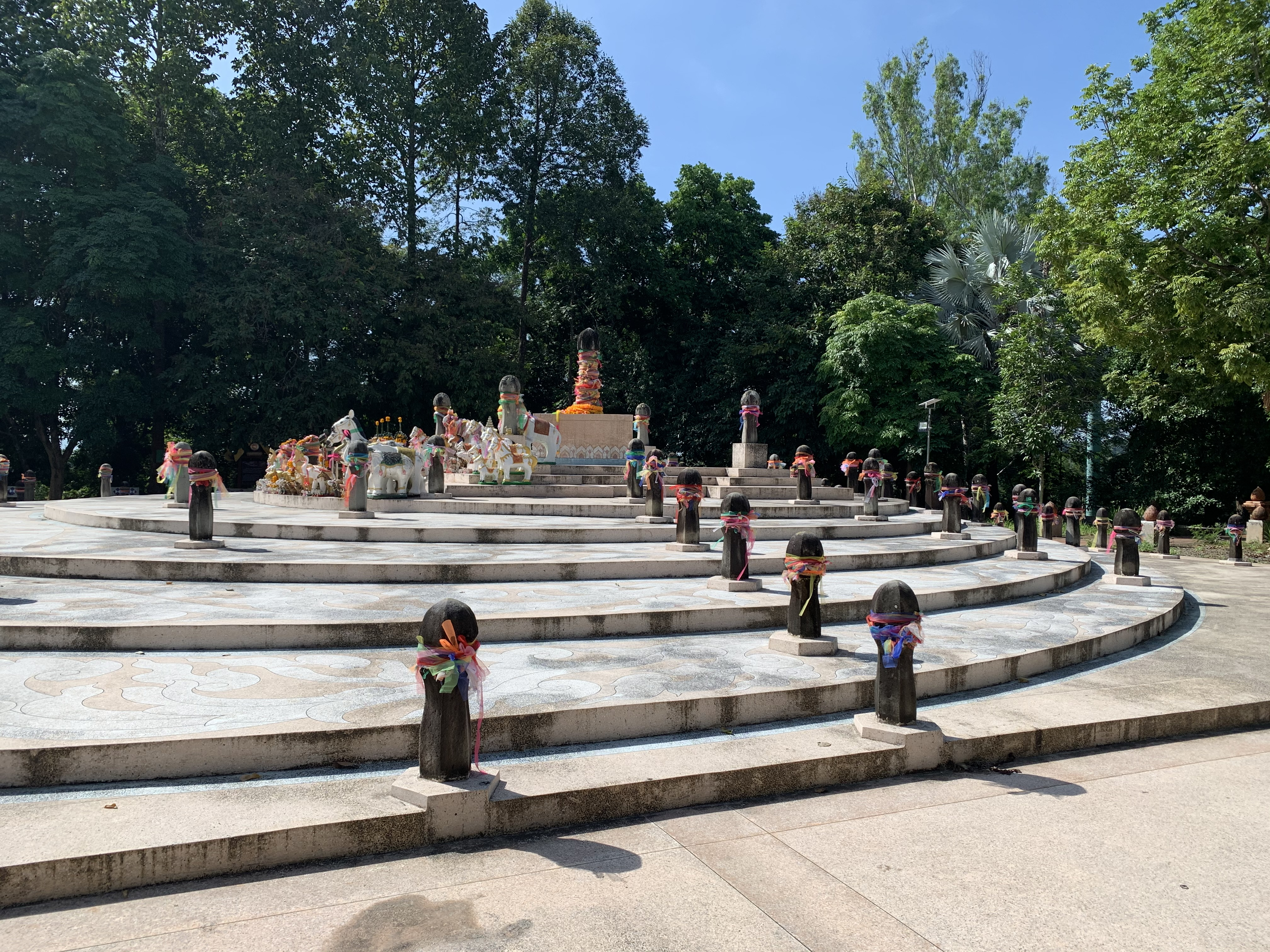
The Navel City Pillar, Chiang Rai

The Navel City Pillar of Chiang Rai (Thai: เสาสะดือเมืองเชียงราย (เสาหลักเมือง)) is a city pillar of Chiang Rai province, located in Wat Phra That Doi Chom Thong temple complex. It was constructed in 1987 on the occasion of the 60th birthday of King Bhumibol Adulyadej and the 725th anniversary of the City of Chiang Rai in northern Thailand.

Construction was supervised by Mr. Aram Aiem-arun, former governor of Chiang Rai and the project supported by the Social Research Institute of Chiang Mai University, Chiang Rai inhabitants, the private sector, and the German government.

The Navel City Pillar is atop Doi Chom Thong (Chom Thong Hill) on the grounds of Wat Phra That Doi Chom Thong. The main pillar and 108 surrounding pillars were constructed in Khmer style "Banom Ba-Keang" based on Lanna beliefs. The outside area symbolises river and land, the inner part the six tiers of the heavens (Catummaharajika, Tavatimsa, Yama, Tusita, Nimmanarati, and Paranimmitavasavatti) which are divided by the five important rivers of ancient legend (Ganges, Yamuna, Ajiravati, Sarabhu, and Mahi). The platform of the main pillar is made of marble which is divided into three tiers to symbolise the Rupabrahma, Arupabrahma, and Nirvana. The main pillar is on a triangular base.

The width of the main pillar is five times the width of the king's fist and its height matches the king's. Mr Singhkhum Somkrue engraved the navel city pillars.

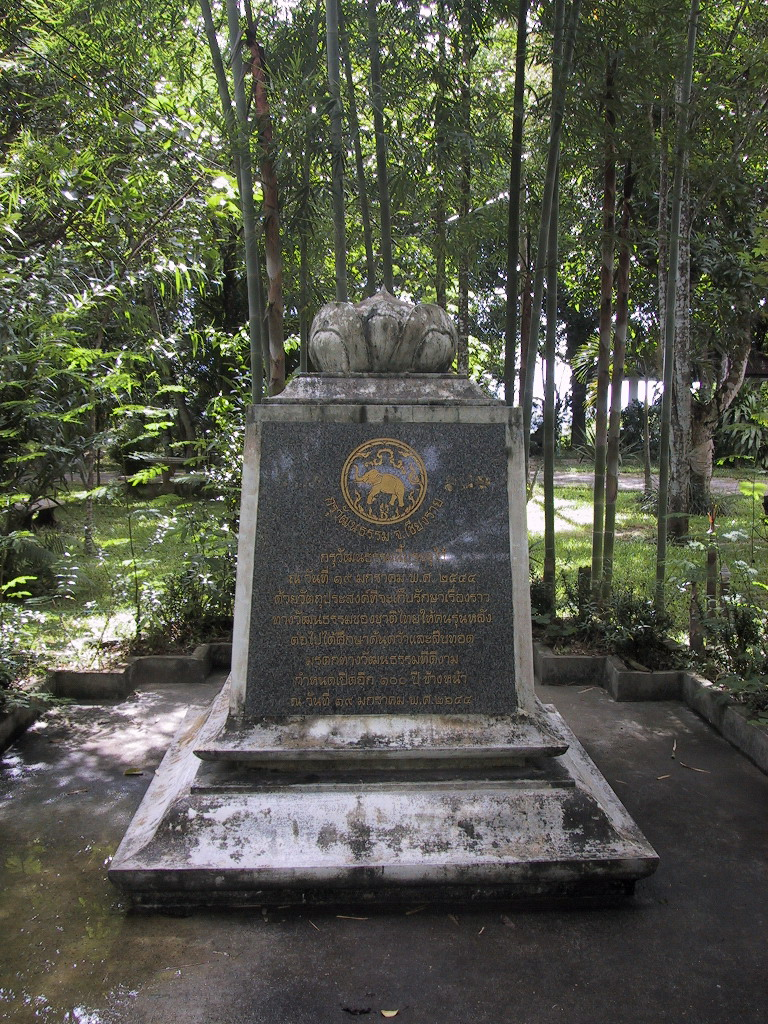
National Cultural Cell of Chiang Rai

Near the navel city pillar, there is a "National Cultural Cell of Chiang Rai" constructed on 19 January 2001. It contains cultural evidence of contemporary culture buried underground. It is to be opened 100 years after its burial.

== See also ==
- Navel of the world
- Omphalos
