= Lak Mueang =

City pillars found in Thailand

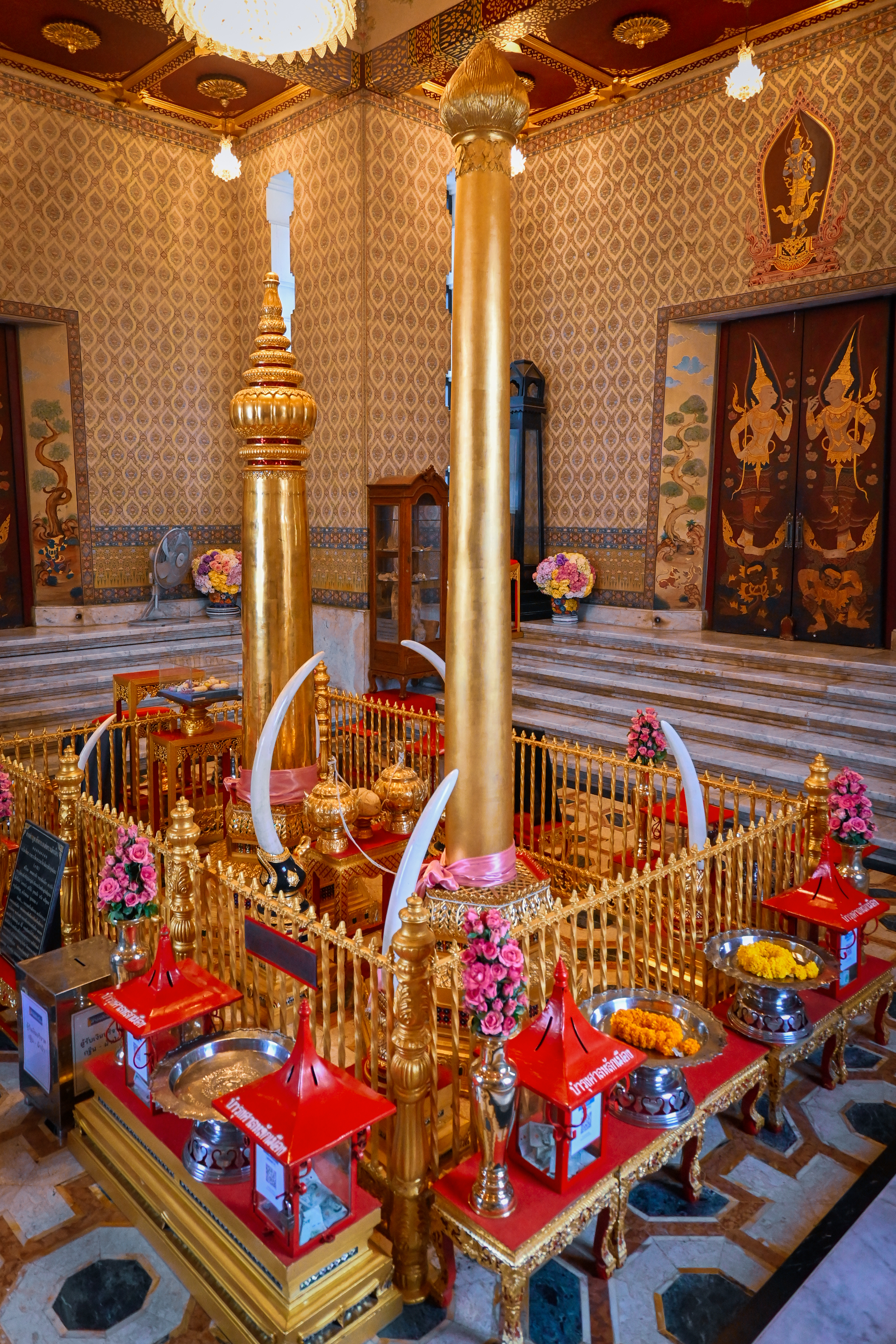
Bangkok

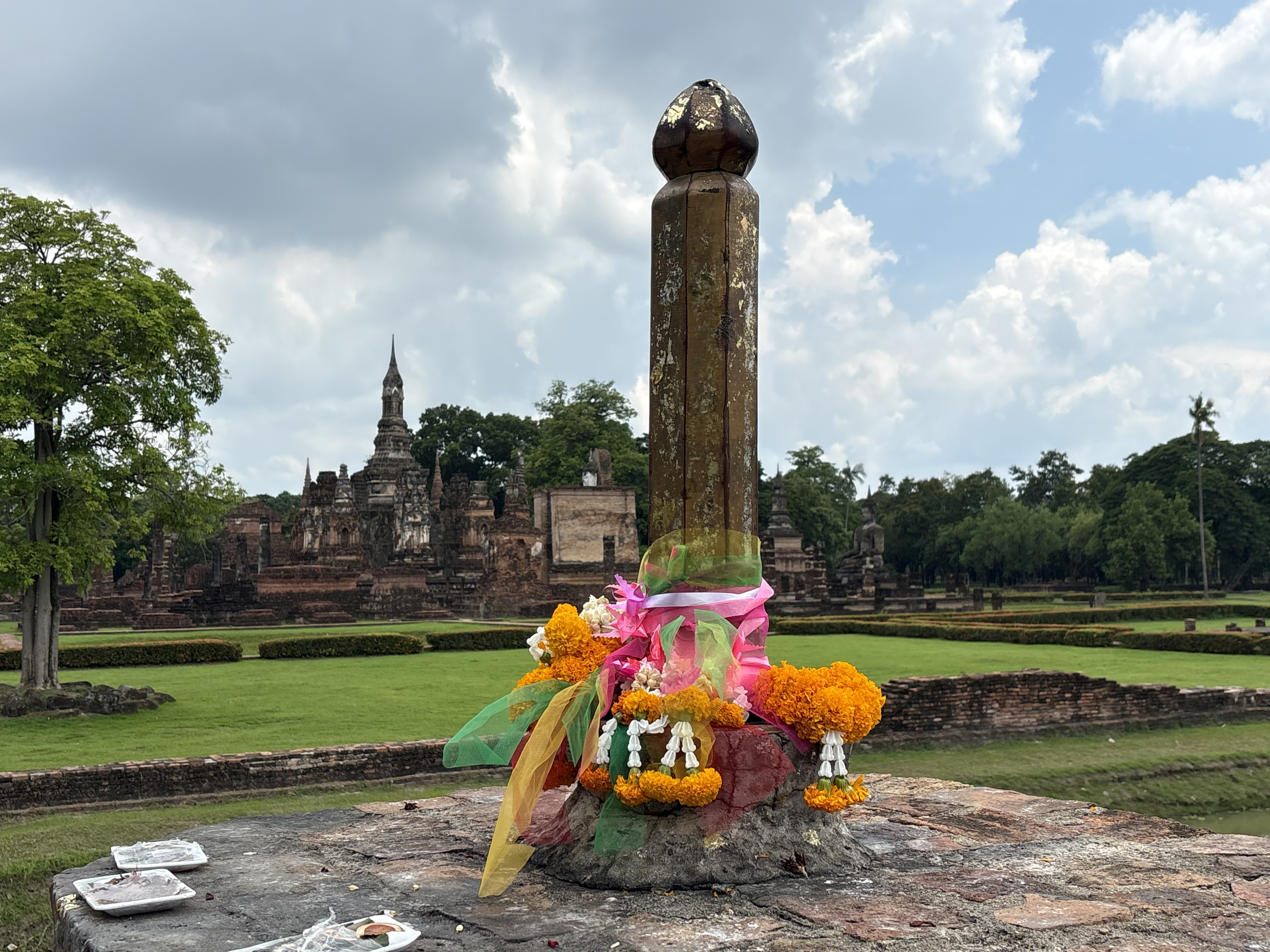
Sukhothai (Sukhothai Historical Park)

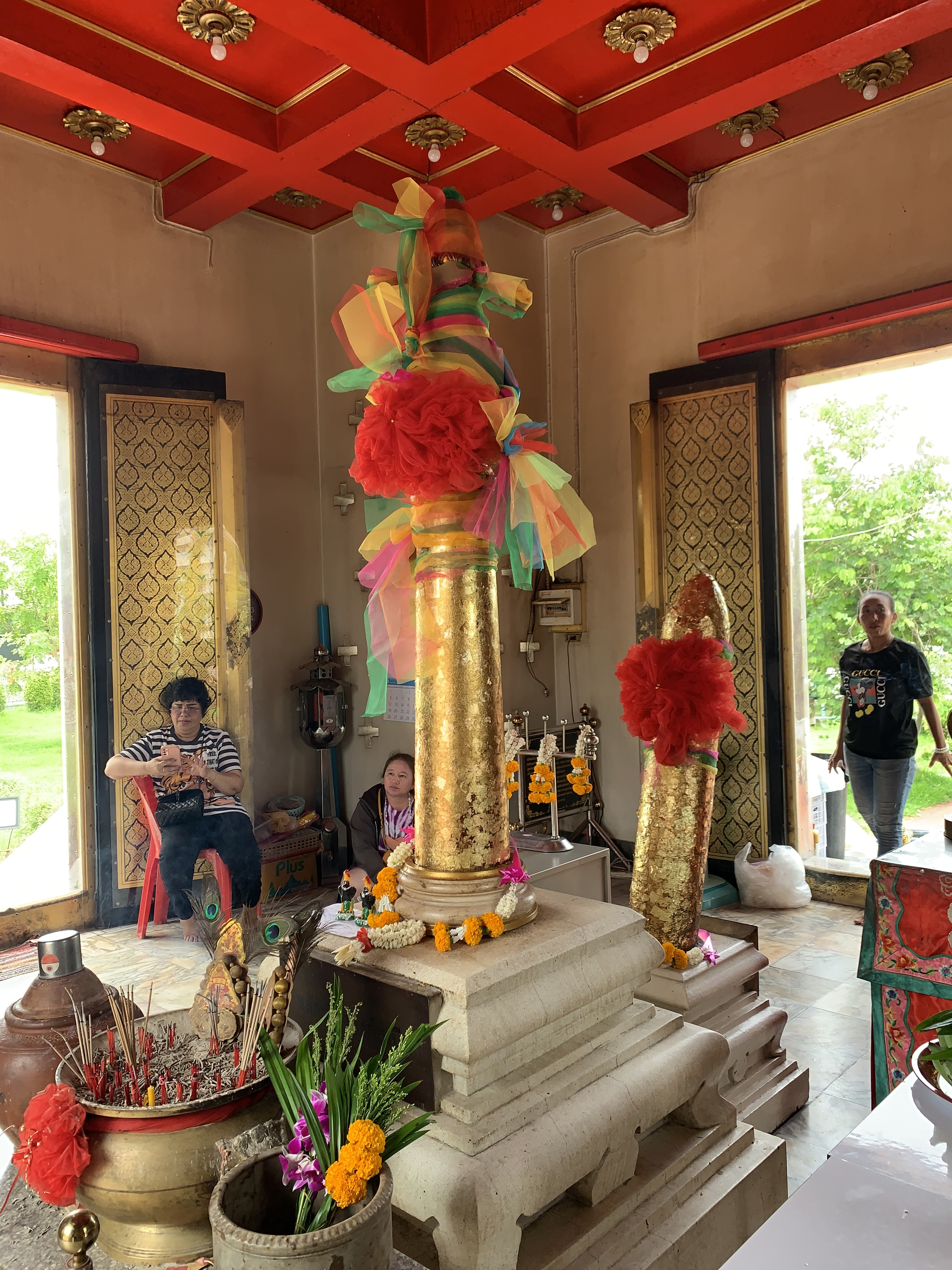
Nakhon Nayok

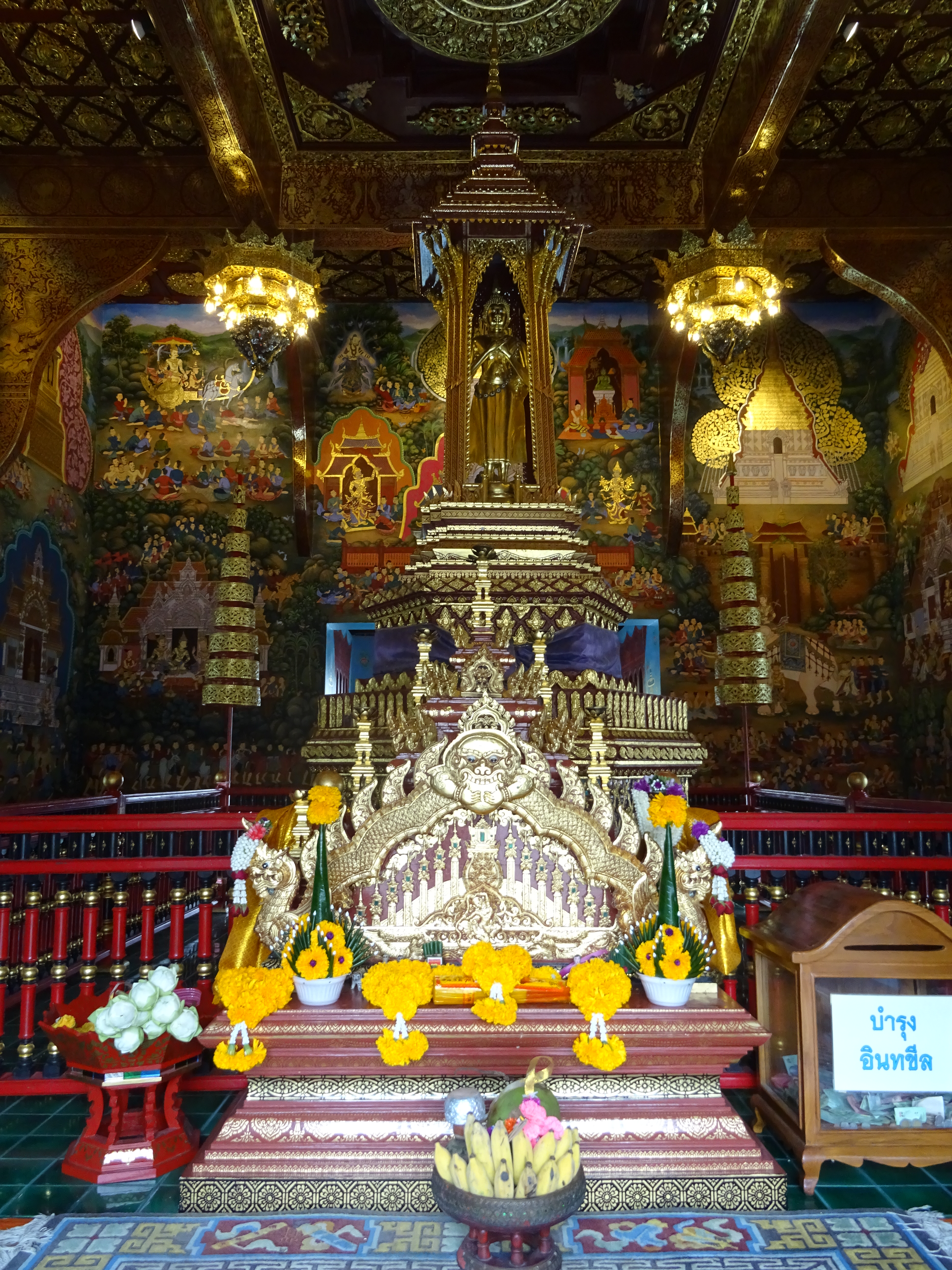
Chiang Mai (Wat Chedi Luang)

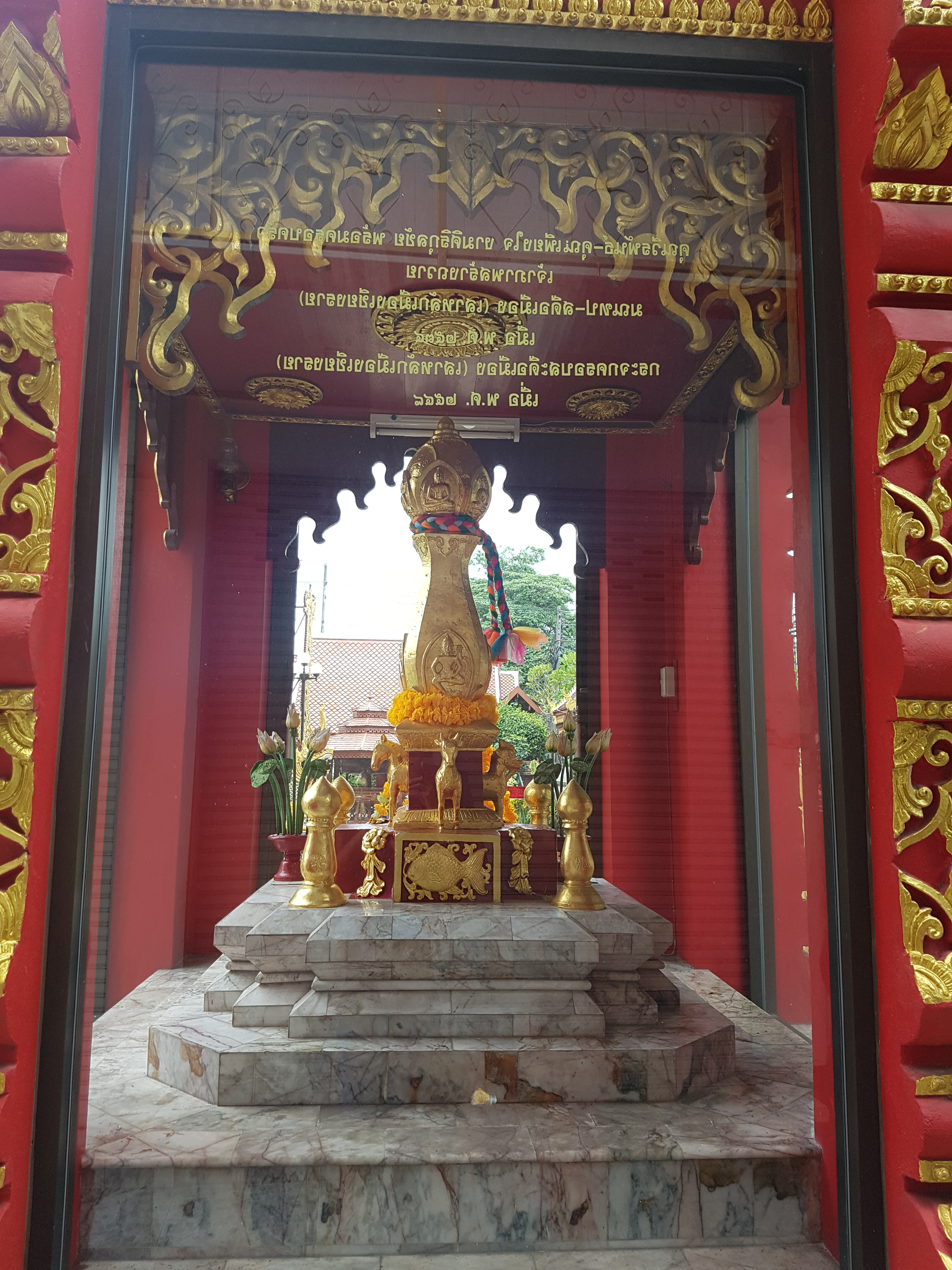
Chiang Rai (Wat Klang Wiang)

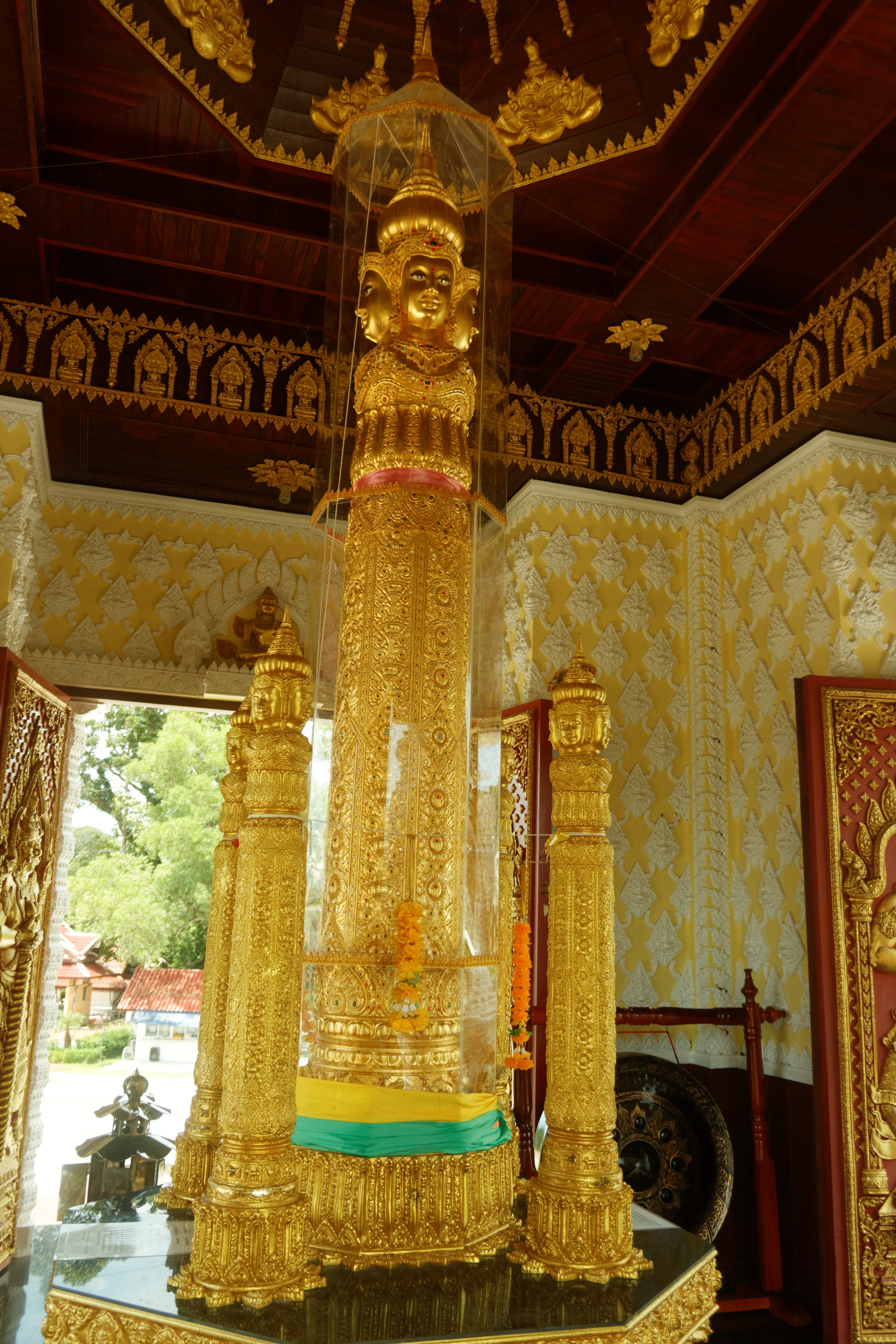
Khanom

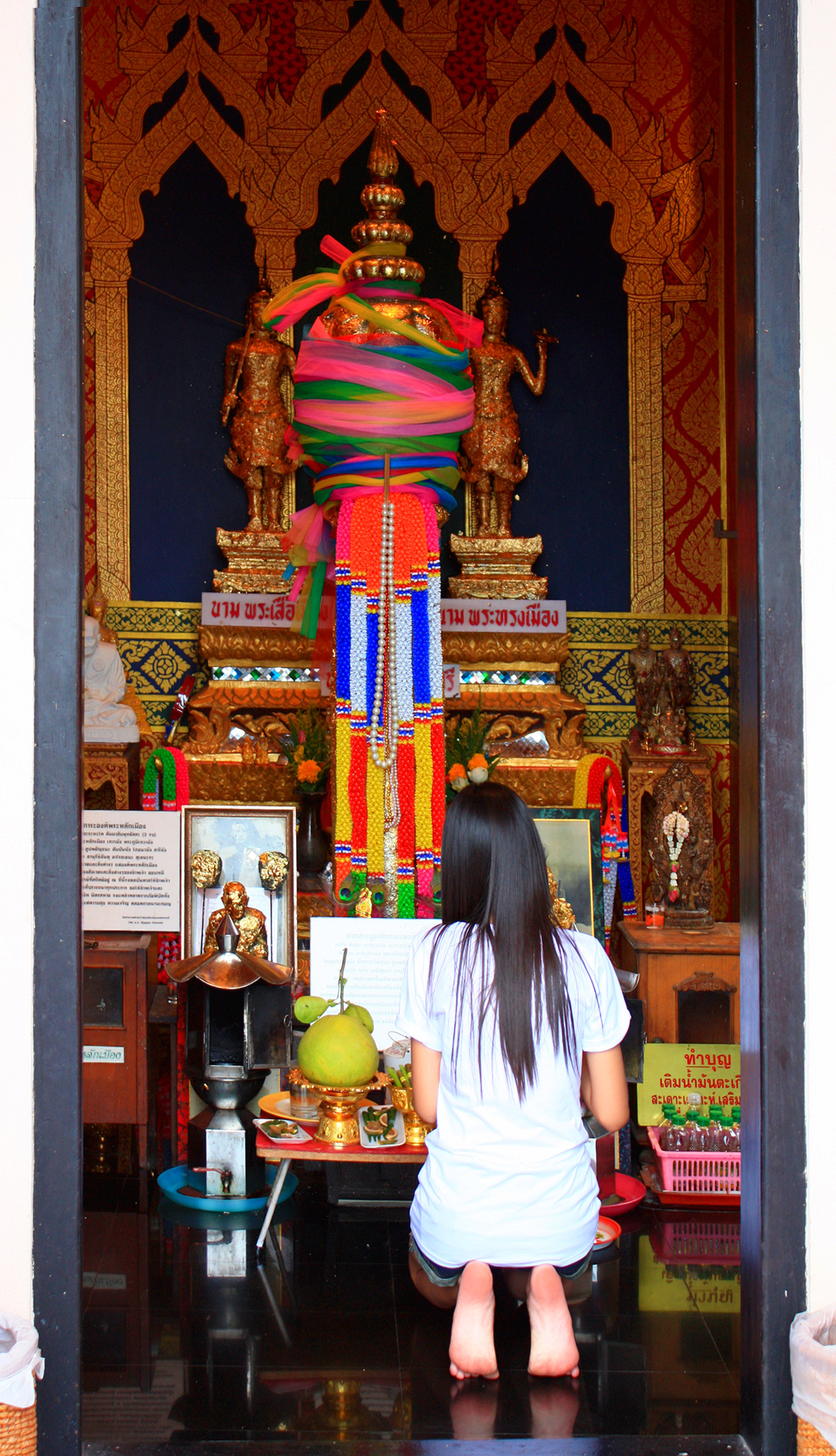
Nakhon Sawan

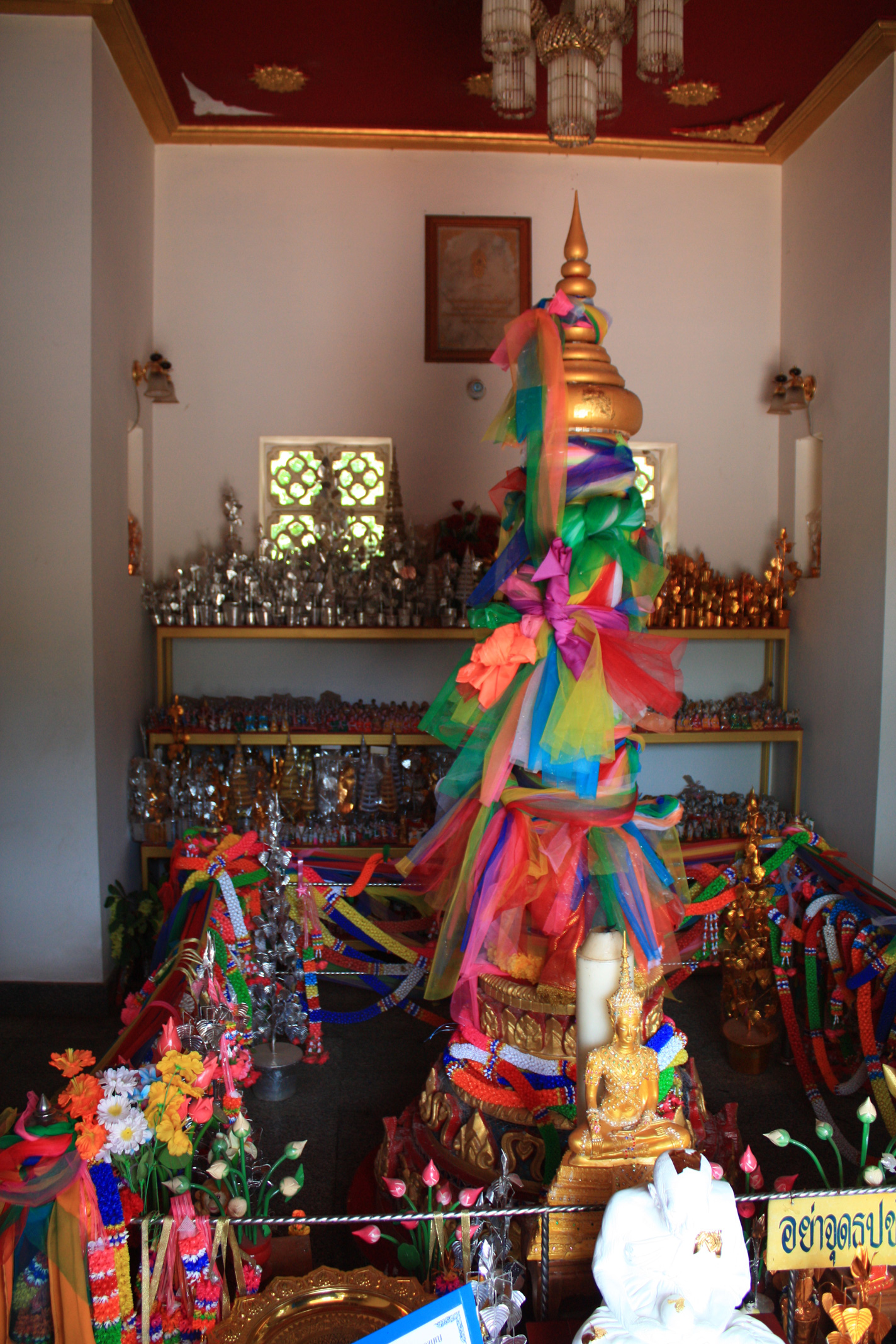
Nakhon Phanom

Examples of Lak Mueang across Thailand

Lak mueang (Thai: หลักเมือง, pronounced [làk mɯ̄a̯ŋ]) are city pillars found in most cities of Thailand. Usually housed in a shrine (ศาลหลักเมือง, [sǎːn làk mɯ̄a̯ŋ]) which is also believed to house Chao Pho Lak Mueang (เจ้าพ่อหลักเมือง, [t͡ɕâw pʰɔ̂ː làk mɯ̄a̯ŋ]), the city spirit deity. It was constructed because the continuation of ancient traditions and Brahman's customs believed that it has something to do with the Held, the single city pillar ceremony (“Lak Muang”) which is made of an Acacia wood Chaiyaphreuk (Thai: ชัยพฤกษ์) before the construction of the city for a major goal to build a city and to be the centre of soul for the citizens.

It was probably King Rama I who erected the first city pillar on 21 April 1782, when he moved his capital from Thonburi to Bangkok. The shrine was the first building in his new capital, the palace and other buildings being constructed later.

== Bangkok City Pillar Shrine ==
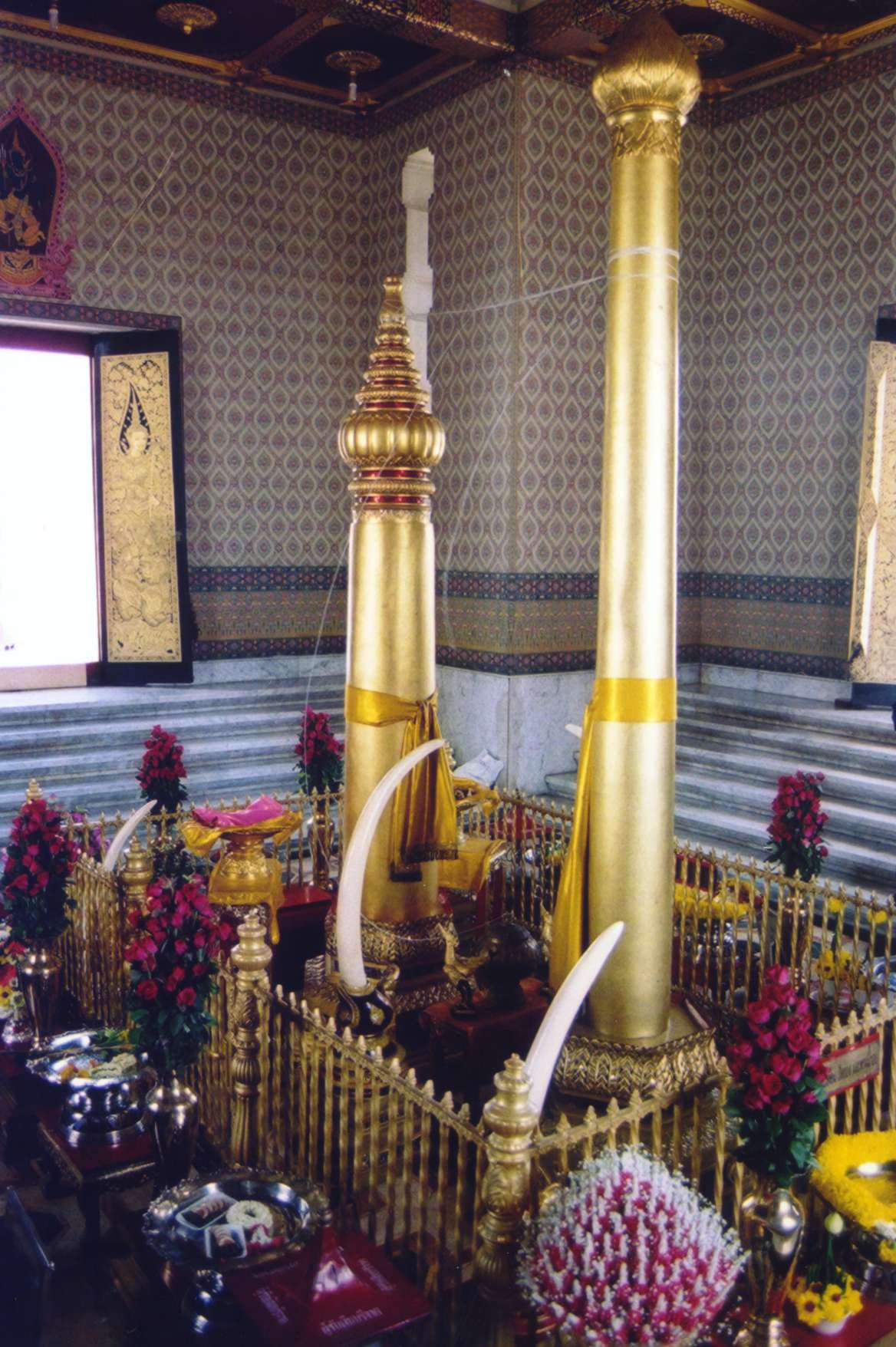
Inside the Bangkok city pillar shrine. The taller pillar is Rama I's original, the shorter was added by King Mongkut (Rama IV)

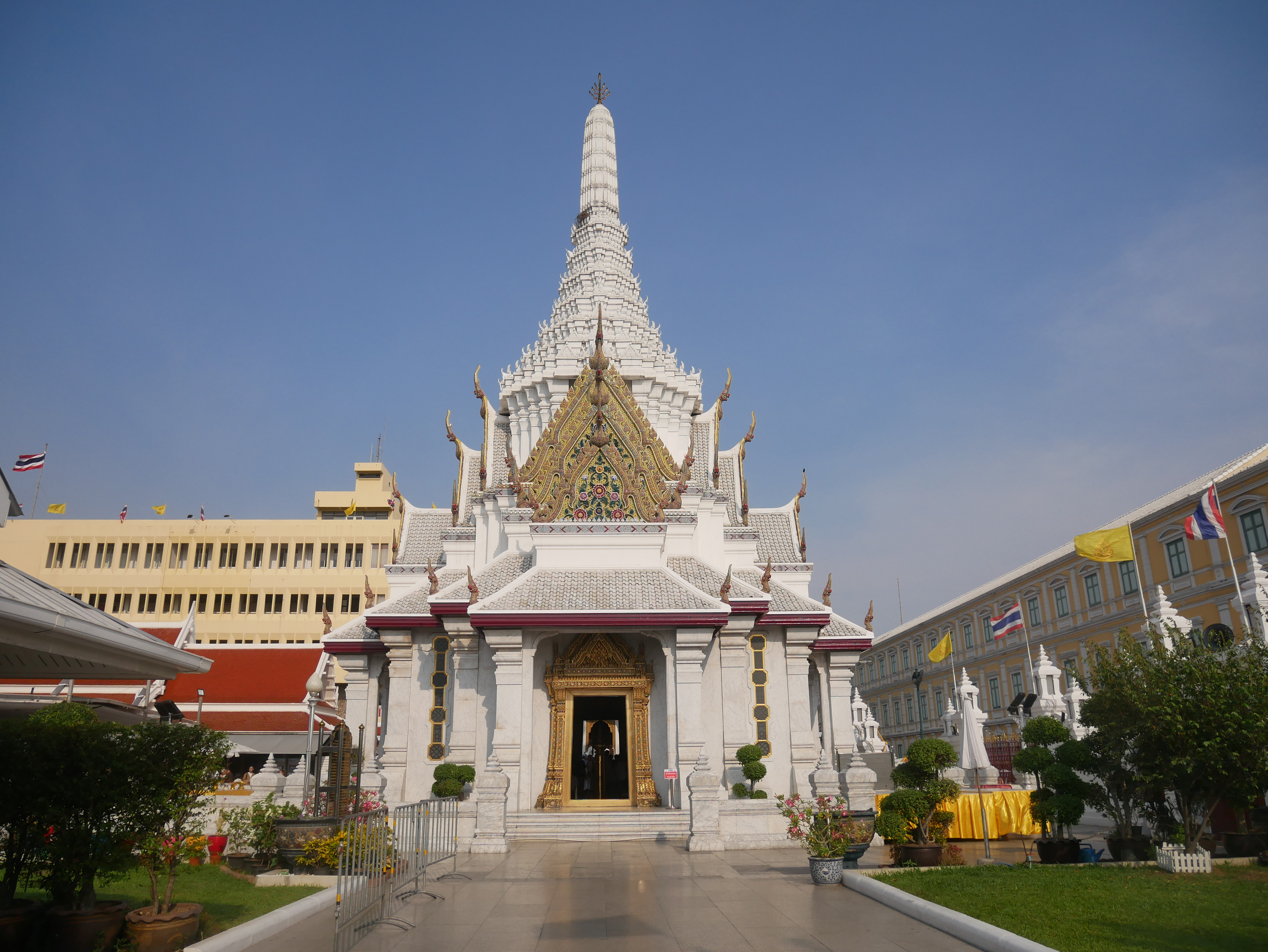
Exterior of the shrine

Bangkok's city pillar shrine (also known as san lak muang) is one of the most ancient, sacred, and magnificent city pillar shrines in Thailand. It is believed that people will achieve prosperity and fulfillment in their work and career, avoid misfortune, and improve their luck, power, and prestige if they bow and pay their respects at this sacred place. The shrine is in the heart of Bangkok, opposite the grand palace in the southeast corner of the Sanam Luang and close to the Ministry of Defence. According to a historian, the shrine was built after the establishment of the Rattanakosin Kingdom (Bangkok) to replace the old capital of the Thonburi Kingdom during the reign of King Rama I of the Chakri dynasty at 06:45, Sunday, 21 April 1782. It was constructed according to ancient traditions such as the Brahmans' belief in the held, the single city pillar ceremony (held "lak muang"), in which a pillar of acacia wood (chaiyapreuk) was erected before the effort of constructing the city began. It was intended to be the spiritual centre for Thai citizens.

"Chaiyapreuk" (acacia) means "tree of victory". This wood was used by Thai locals to build a pillar 270 centimetres (110 in) high, buried 200 centimetres (79 in) deep, making a total height of 470 centimetres (190 in), and 74 centimetres (29 in) in diameter. Inside was a horoscope for Bangkok. However, the shrine was renovated several times during the reigns of Kings Rama IV and Mongkut, and then became dilapidated. The king therefore ordered the excavation of the old pillar and construction of a replacement, with a new horoscope for the city placed inside. In 1852 the new pillar was installed, measuring 5.115 metres (201.4 in) tall, 47 centimetres (18.8 in) in diameter at the bottom, with a base 180 centimetres (71 in) wide. Both old and new pillars were moved to a refurbished pavilion with a spire (prang) modelled on the shrine of Ayudhya. The shrine was finished on Sunday, 1 May 1853. In 1980, in preparation for the celebration of the 200th anniversary of Rattanakosin in 1982, the Bangkok city pillar shrine underwent renovation, including the addition of arches to house a five-city guardian deity. is popular worshipped in Tai folk religion and hinduism such as Kāla and Chitragupta.

According to the In–Chan–Mun–Kong legend of the shrine, Thai locals believed that the construction of the shrine required the sacrifice of four people after the proclamation of the words "in–chan–mun–kong" all over the city ("in" from the north, "chan" from the south, "mun" from the east, and "kong" from the west). Anyone who responded was captured, brought to the ceremonial location, and buried in a hole. Their spirits would guard and protect the city. This is only a myth and is not recorded in the chronicles.

People usually use three incense sticks, one candle, gold foil, two lotus flowers, two flower garlands, and one three-colour taffeta to worship at the shrine.

== Outside Bangkok ==
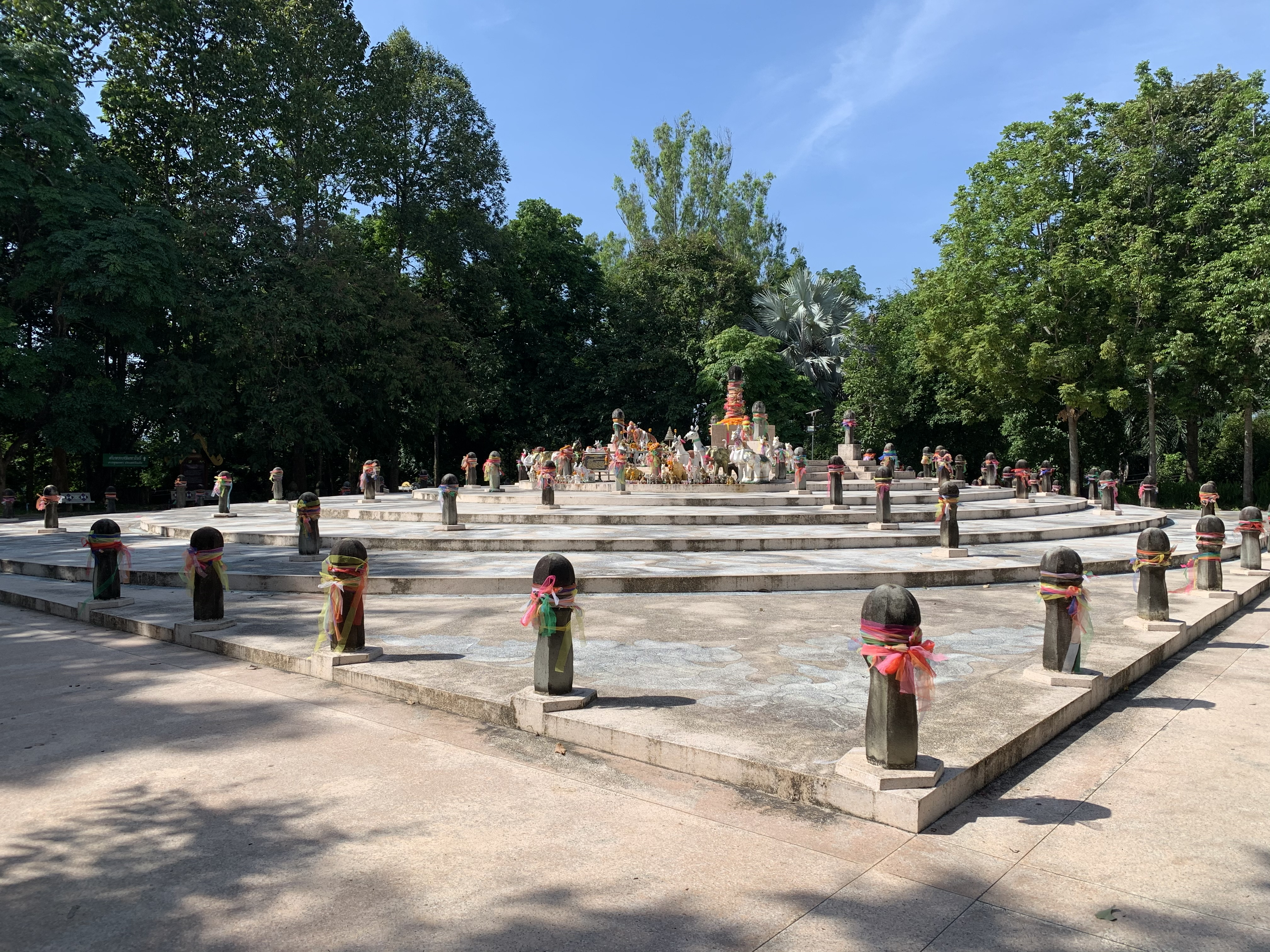
Navel City Pillar (sadue mueang) of Chiang Rai, located in Wat Phra That Doi Chom Thong

Shortly after the shrine in Bangkok, similar shrines were built in strategic provinces to symbolise central power, such as in Songkhla. More shrines were created during the reign of King Buddha Loetla Nabhalai (Rama II) in Nakhon Khuen Khan and Samut Prakan, and by King Nangklao (Rama III) in Chachoengsao, Chanthaburi, and Phra Tabong Province (now in Cambodia). However, after King Mongkut raised a new pillar in Bangkok, no further shrines in the provinces were built until 1944, when then-Prime Minister of Thailand Phibunsongkhram built a city pillar in Phetchabun, as he intended to move the capital to this town. Though this plan failed to get approval by the parliament, the idea of city pillars caught on, and in the following years several provincial towns built new shrines. In 1992, the Ministry of Interior ordered that every province should have such a shrine. As of 2010, however, a few provinces still have no city pillar shrine. In Chonburi the shrine was scheduled to be finished by the end of 2011.

The building style of the shrines varies. Especially in provinces with a significant Thai Chinese influence, the city pillar may be housed in a shrine that resembles a Chinese temple as, for example in Songkhla, Samut Prakan, and Yasothon. Chiang Rai's city pillar is not housed in a shrine at all; but, since 1988, is in an open place inside Wat Phra That Doi Chom Thong; it is called the sadue mueang (Thai: สะดือเมือง), 'navel' or 'omphalos' of the city. In Roi Et, the city pillar is housed in a sala (open-air pavilion) on an island in the lake in the centre of the city.

== Gallery ==
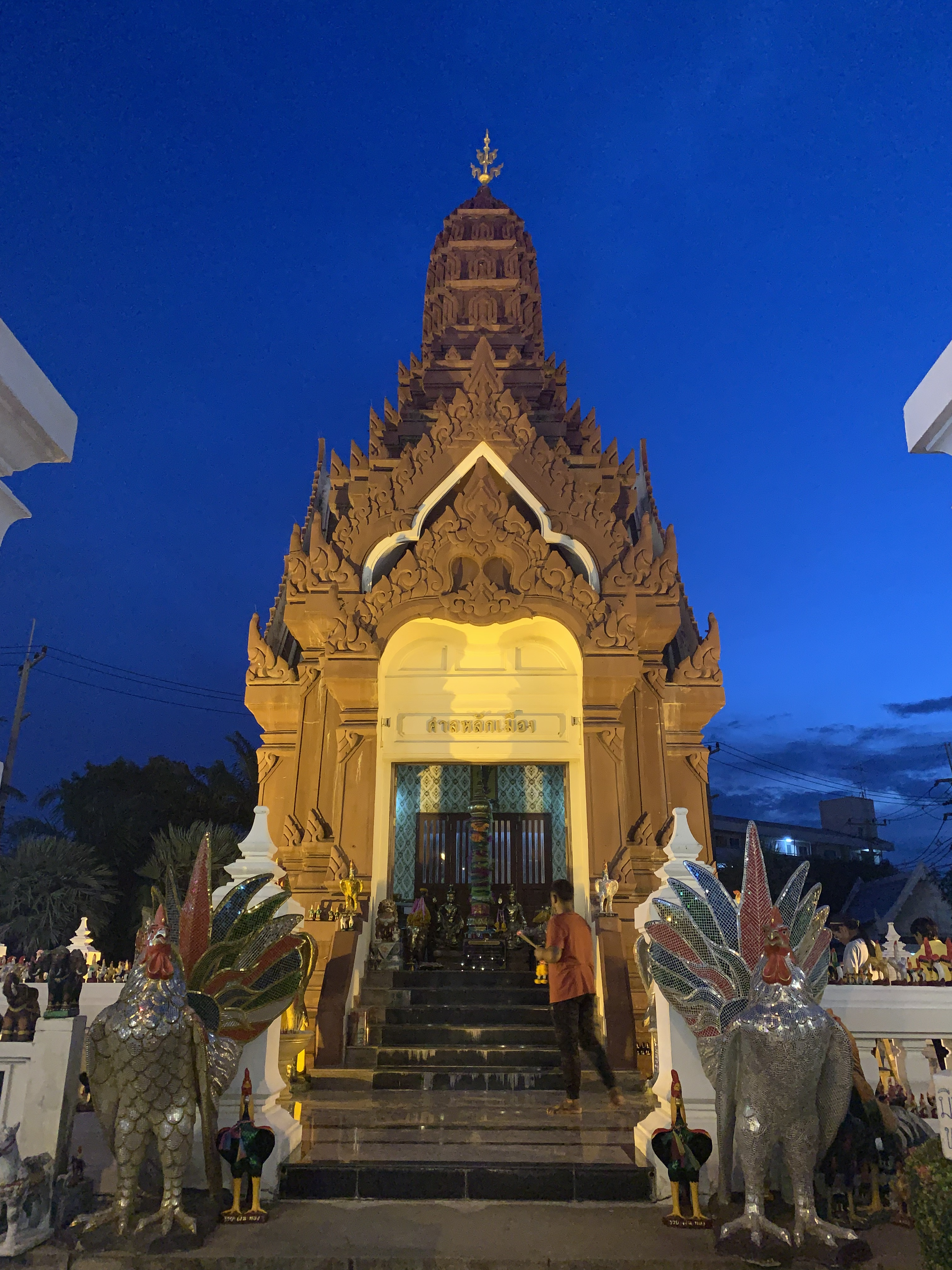
Ang Thong

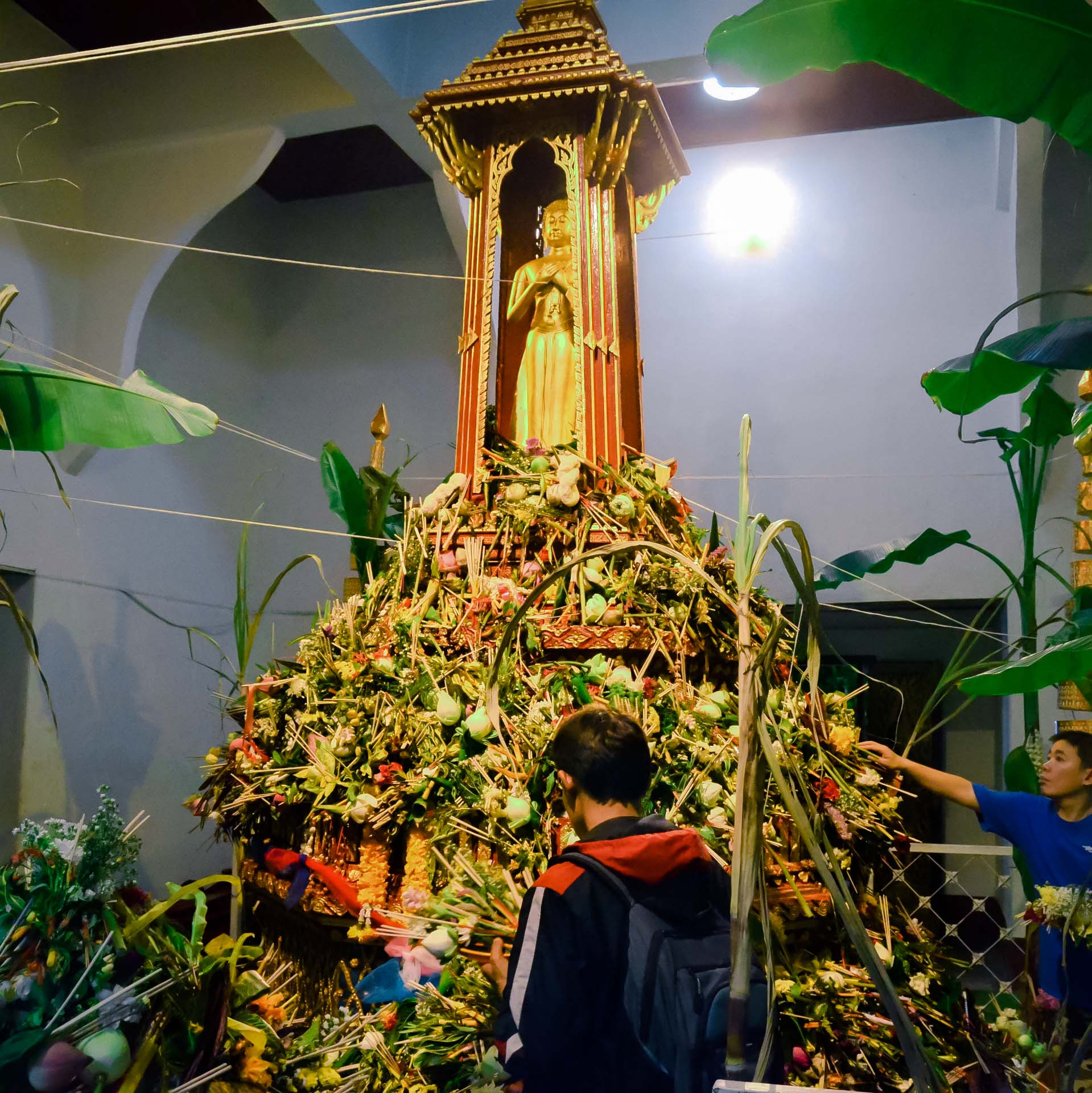
Chiang Mai (termed Inthakin)

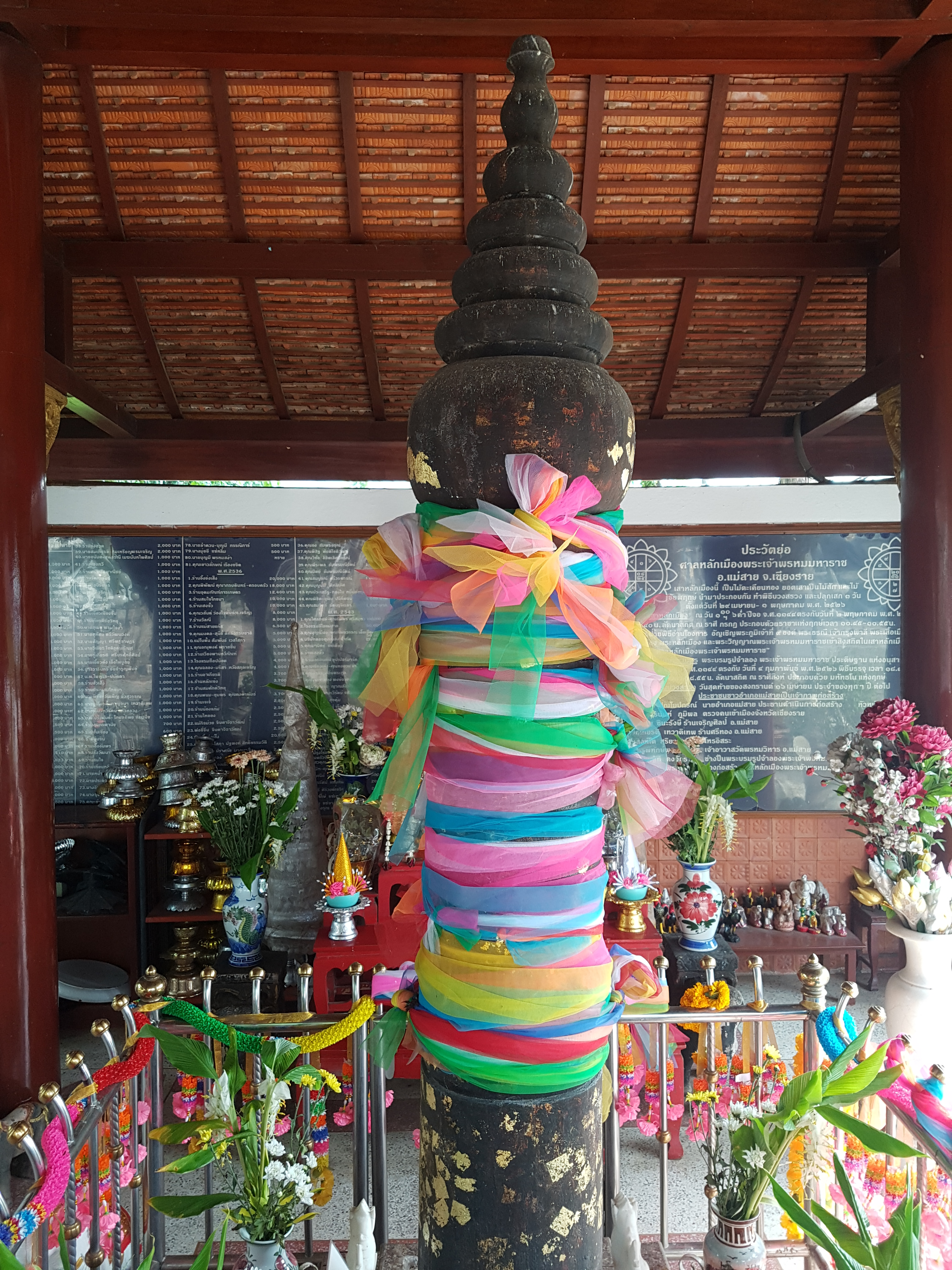
Mae Sai, Chiang Rai province

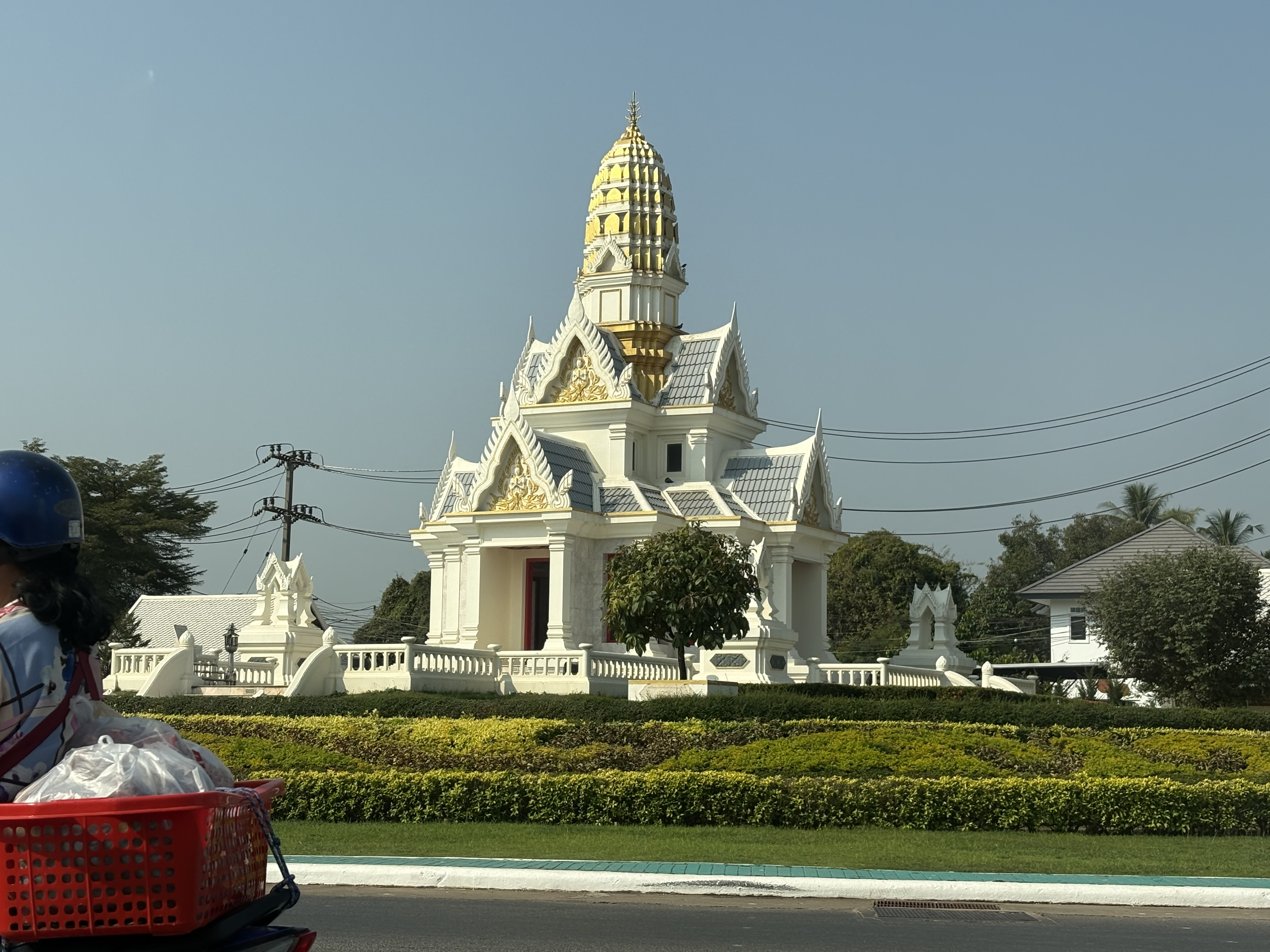
Sawankhalok, Sukhothai province

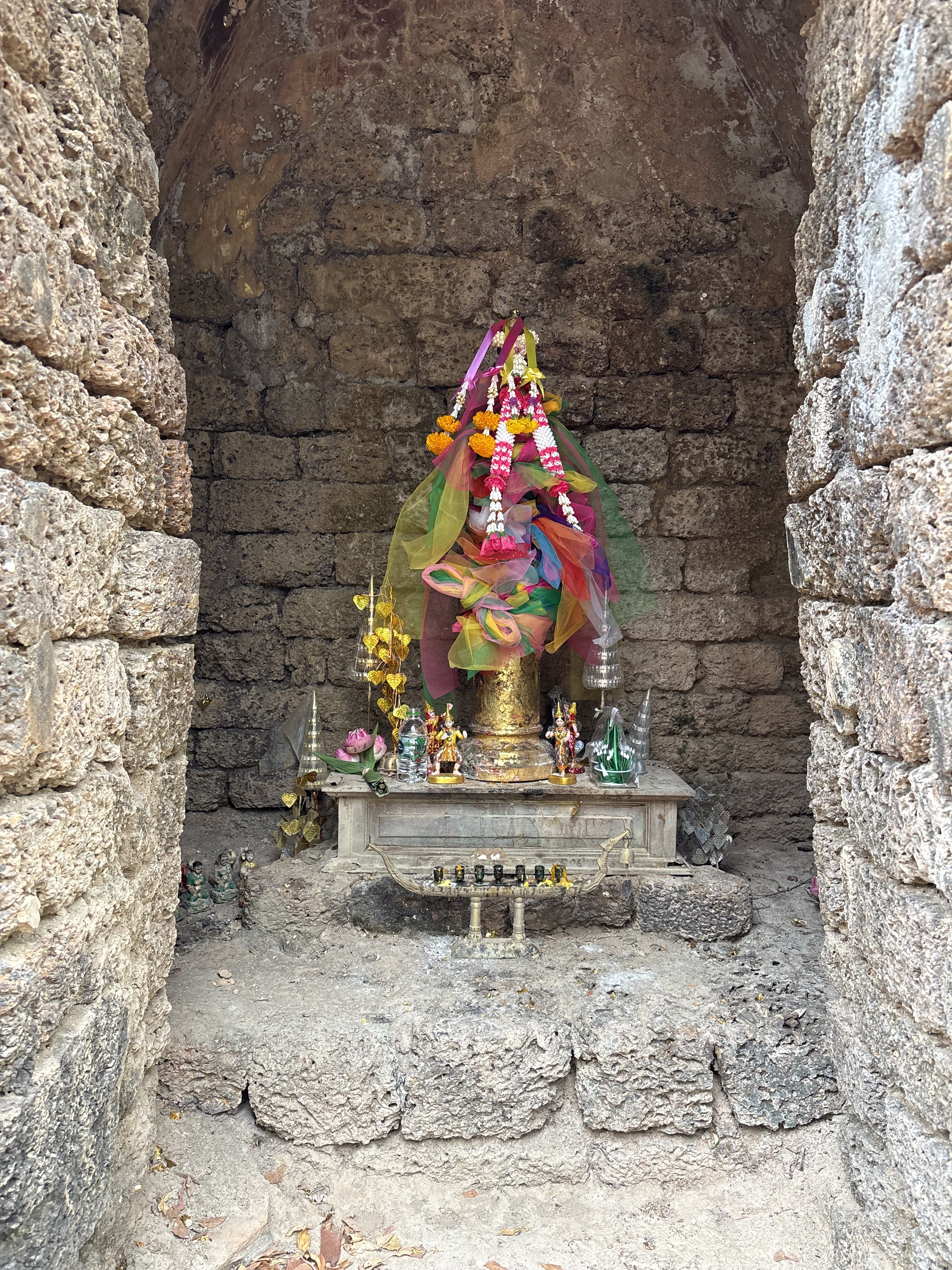
Si Satchanalai, Sukhothai province

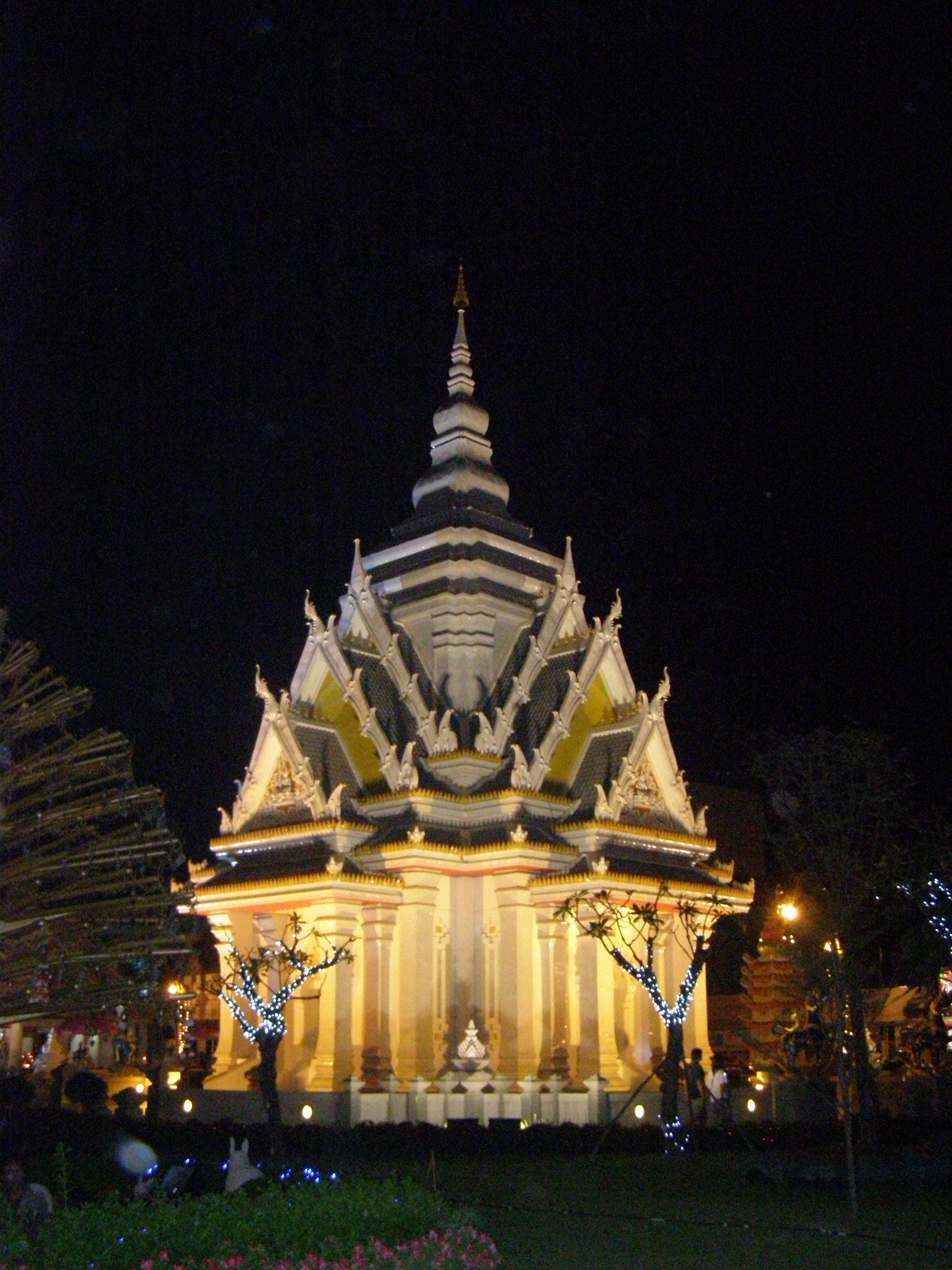
Khon Kaen

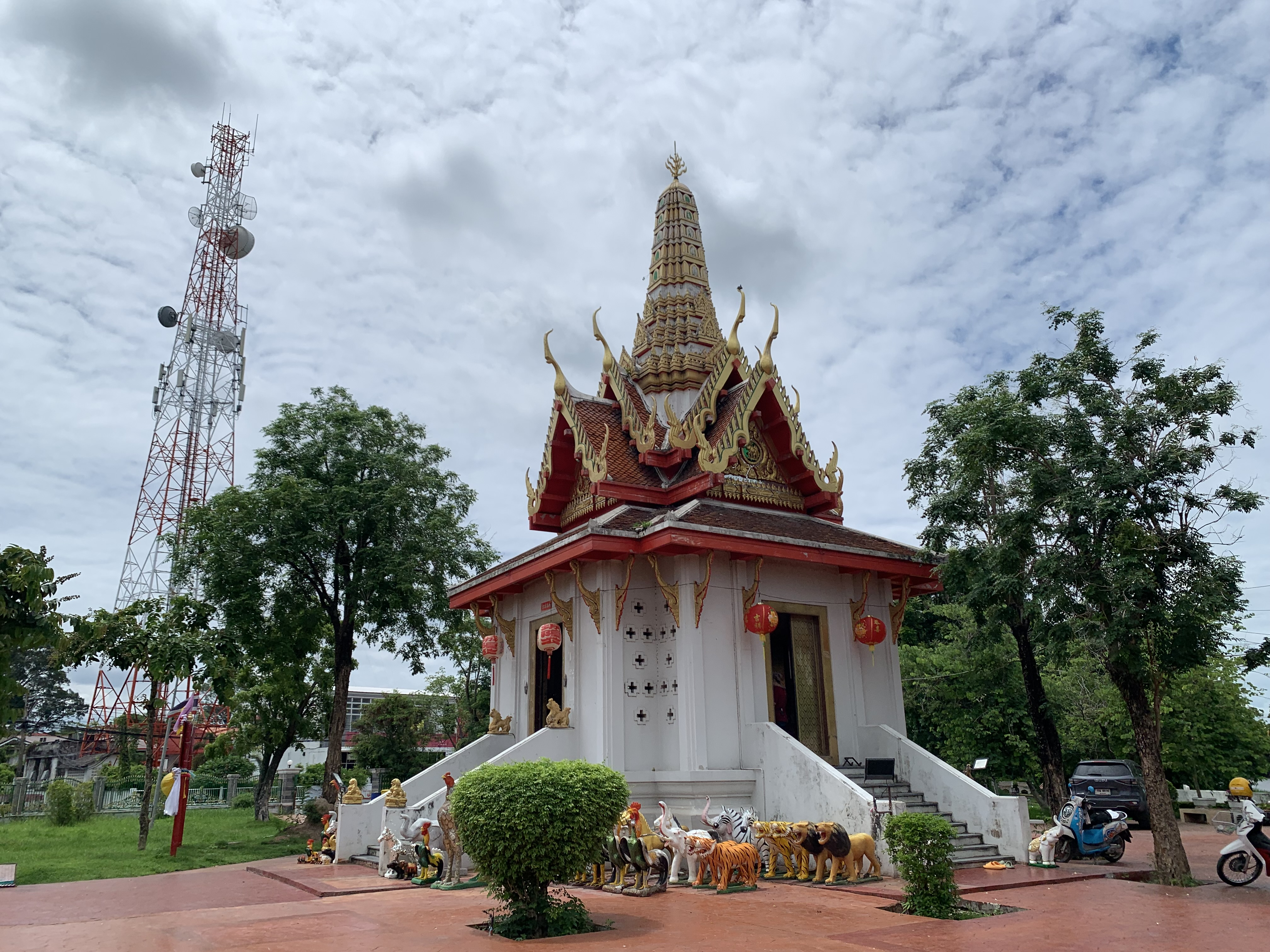
Nakhon Nayok

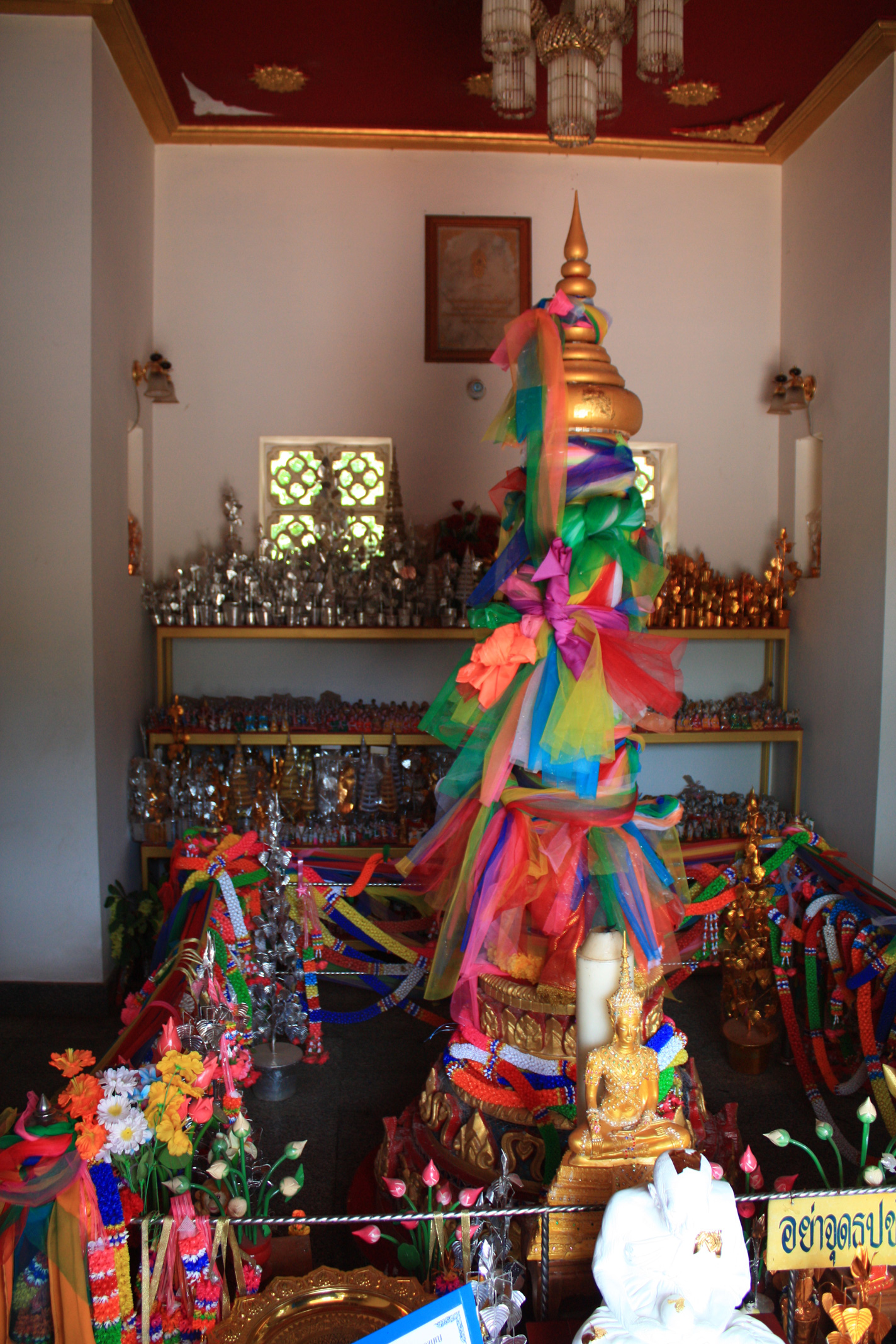
Nakhon Phanom

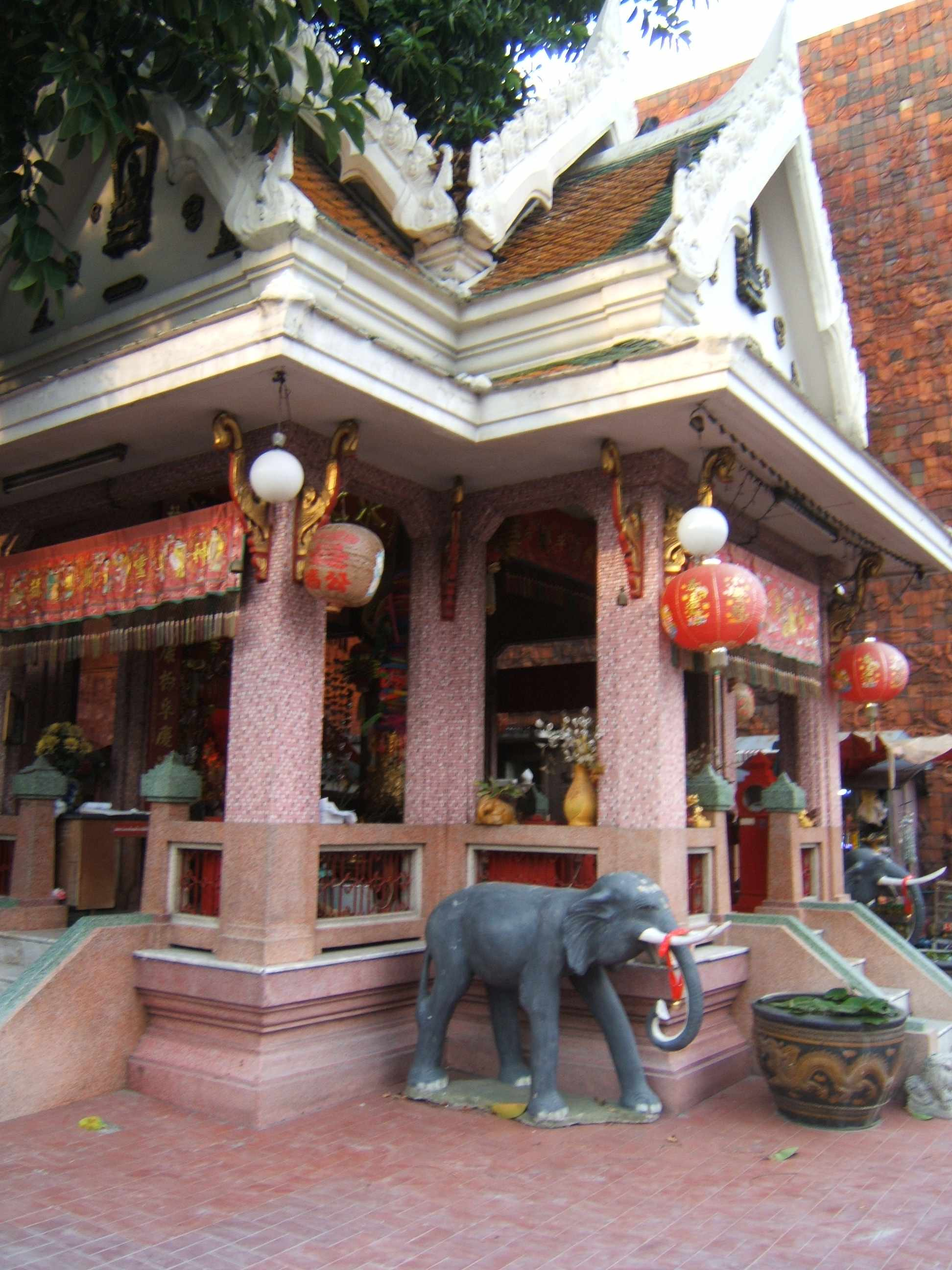
Nakhon Ratchasima

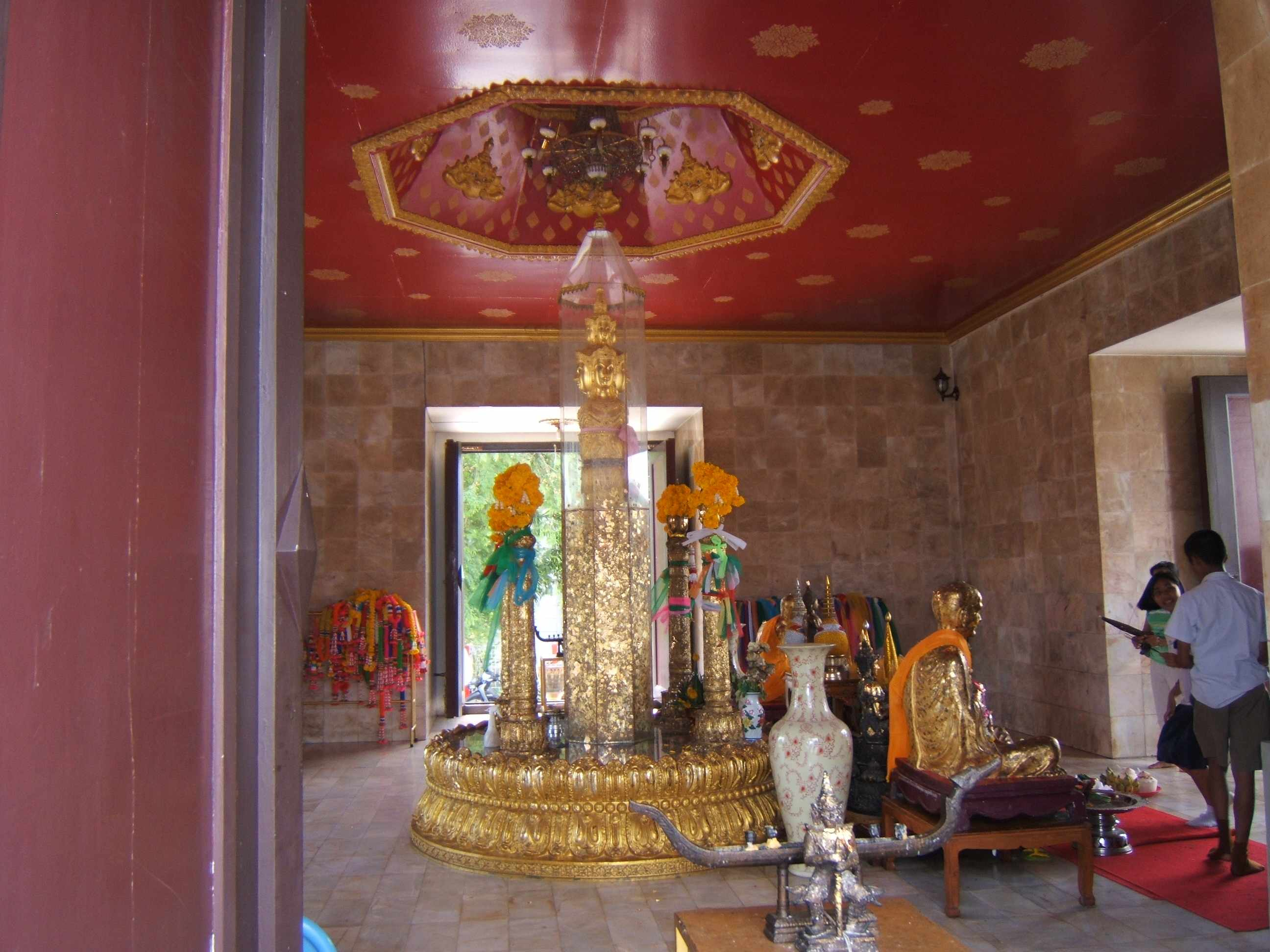
Nakhon Si Thammarat

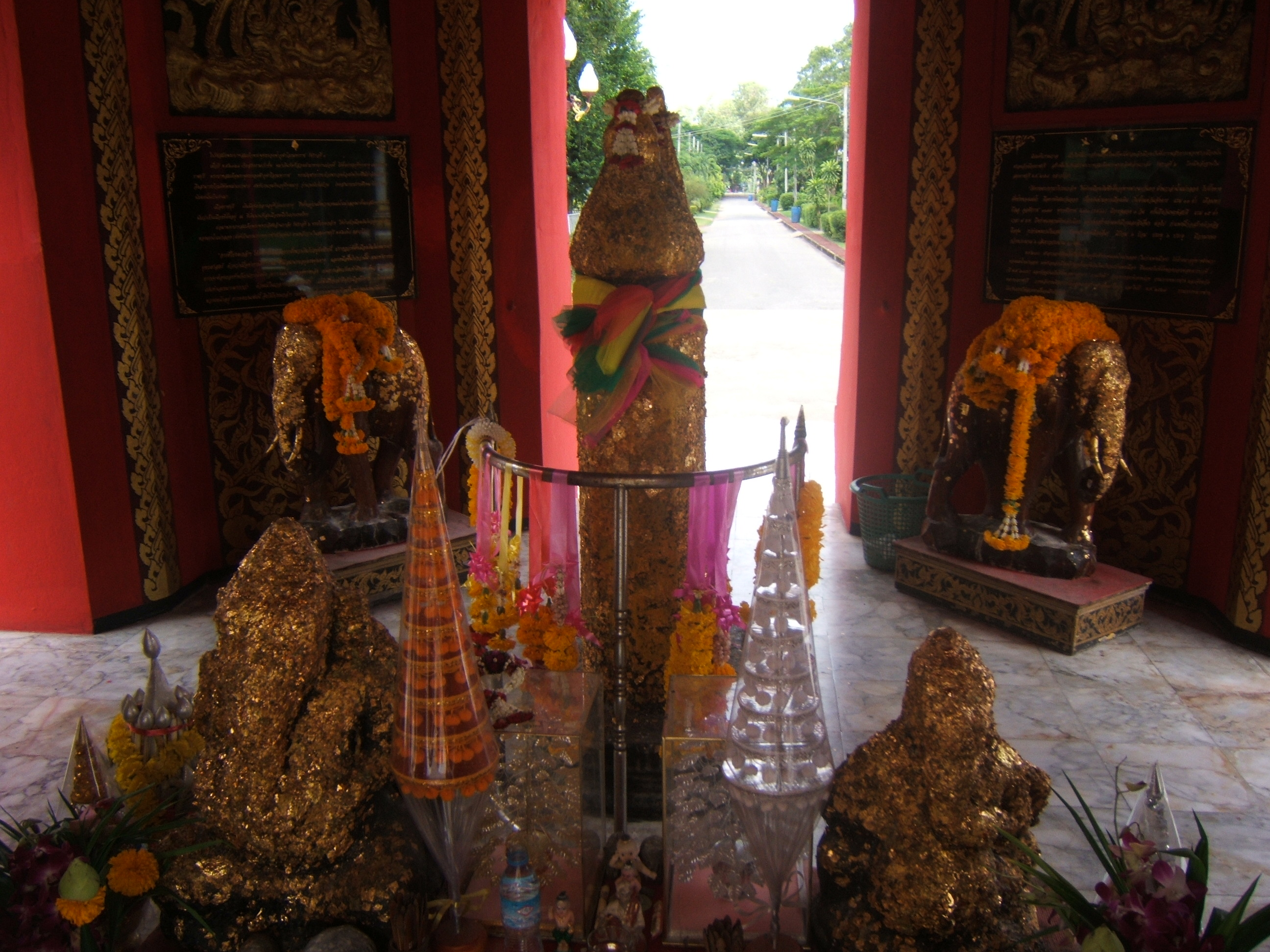
Phetchaburi

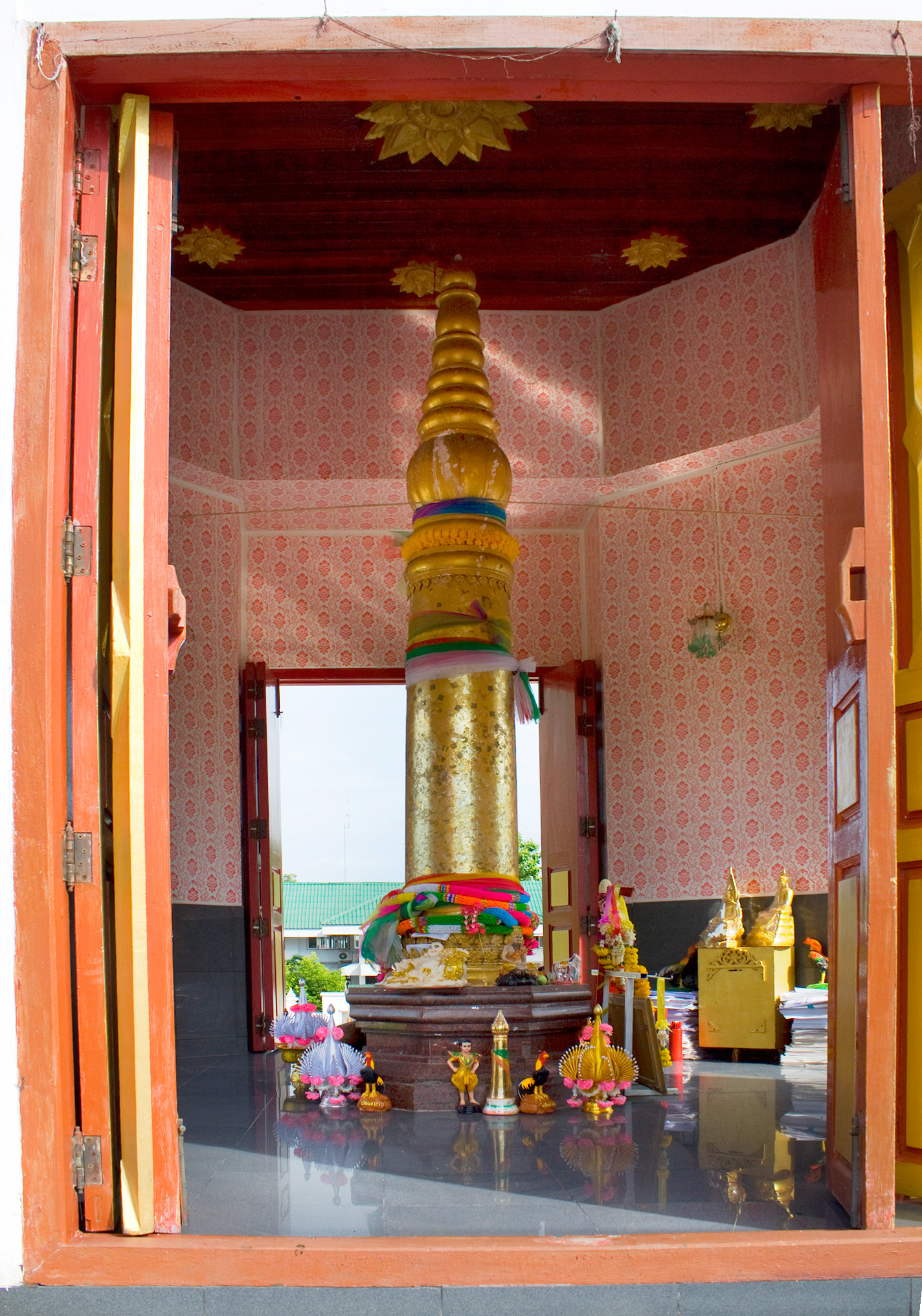
Phitsanulok

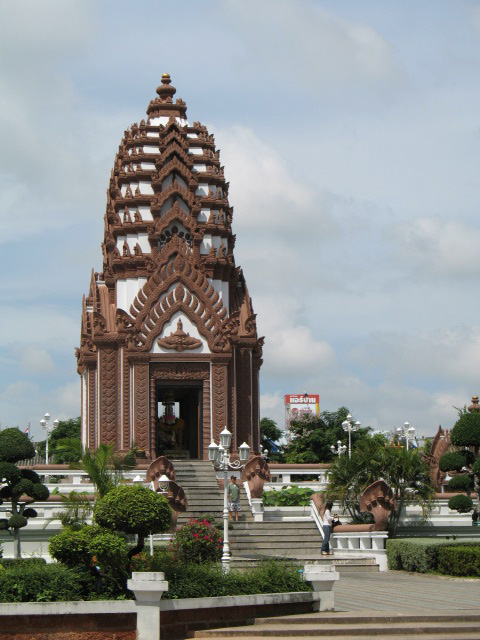
Prachuap Khiri Khan

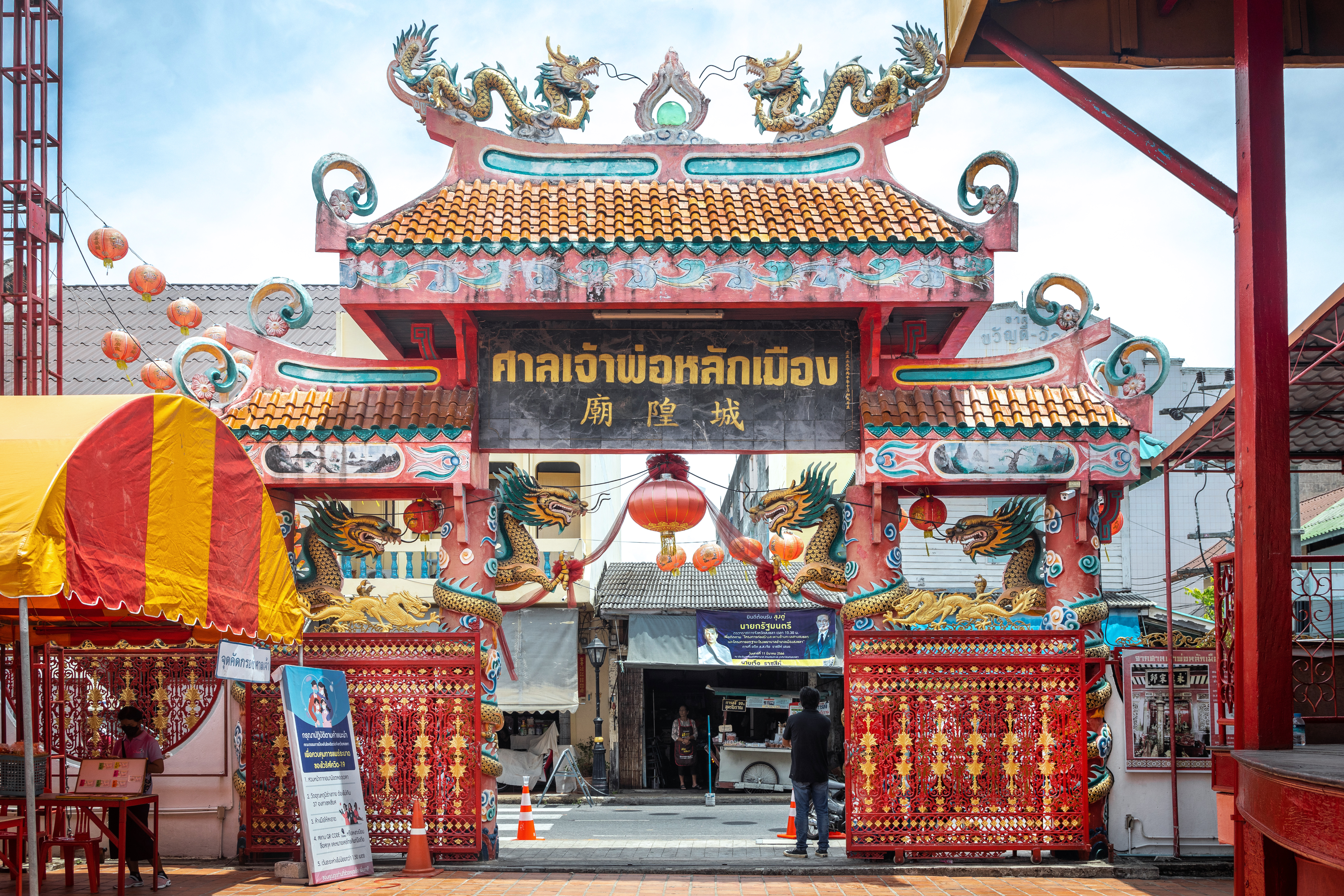
Songkhla

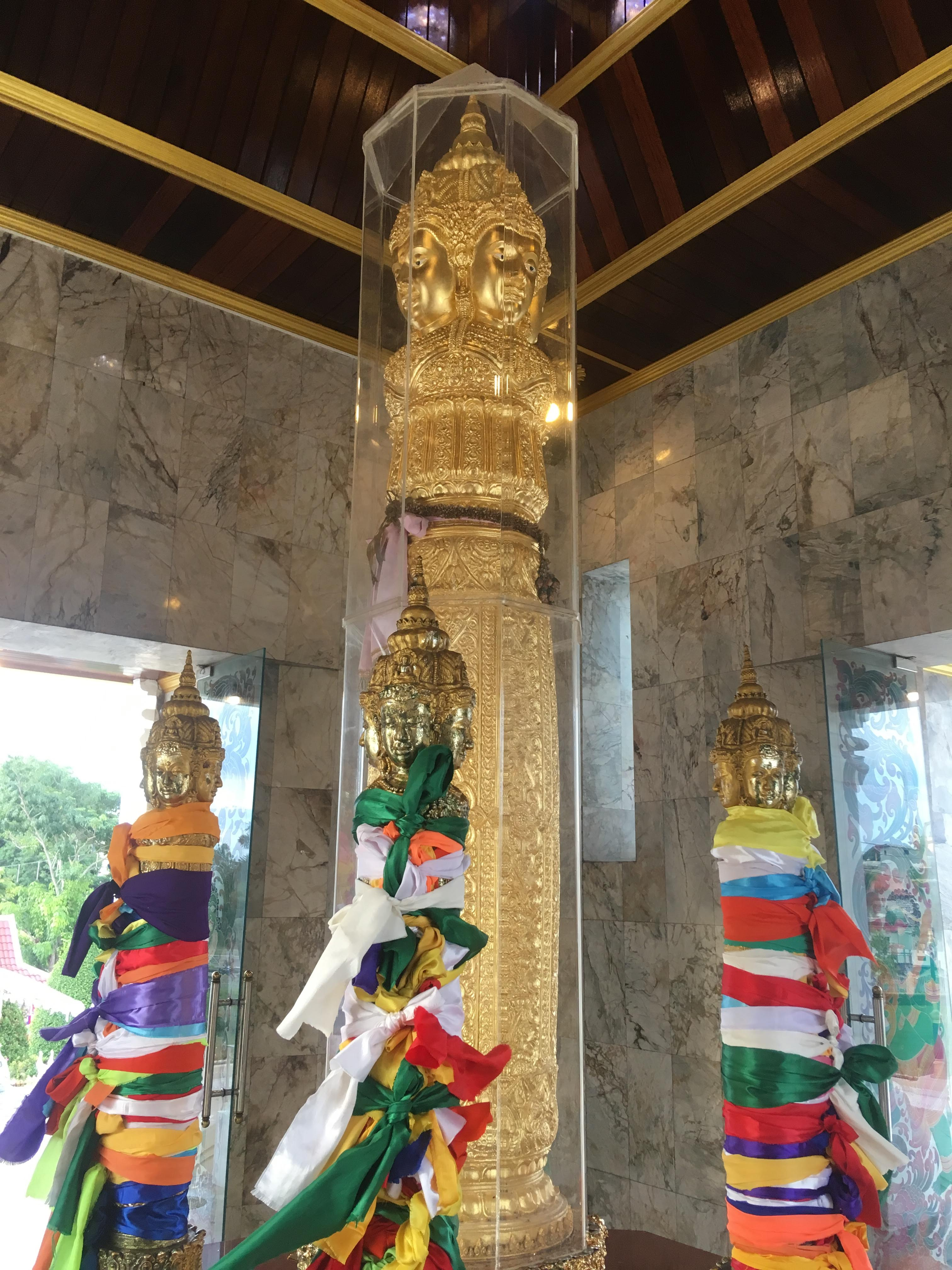
Surat Thani

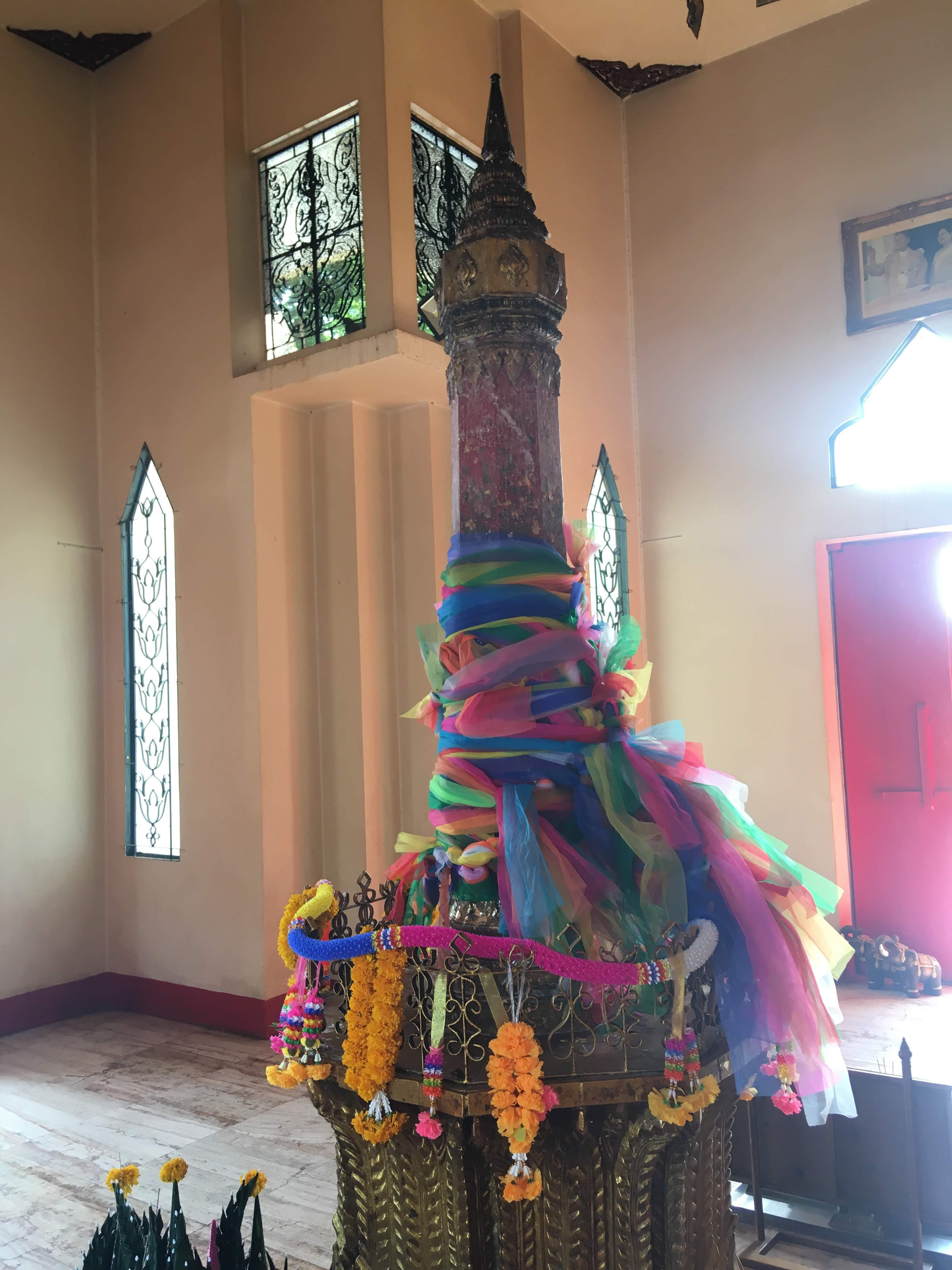
Ubon Ratchathani

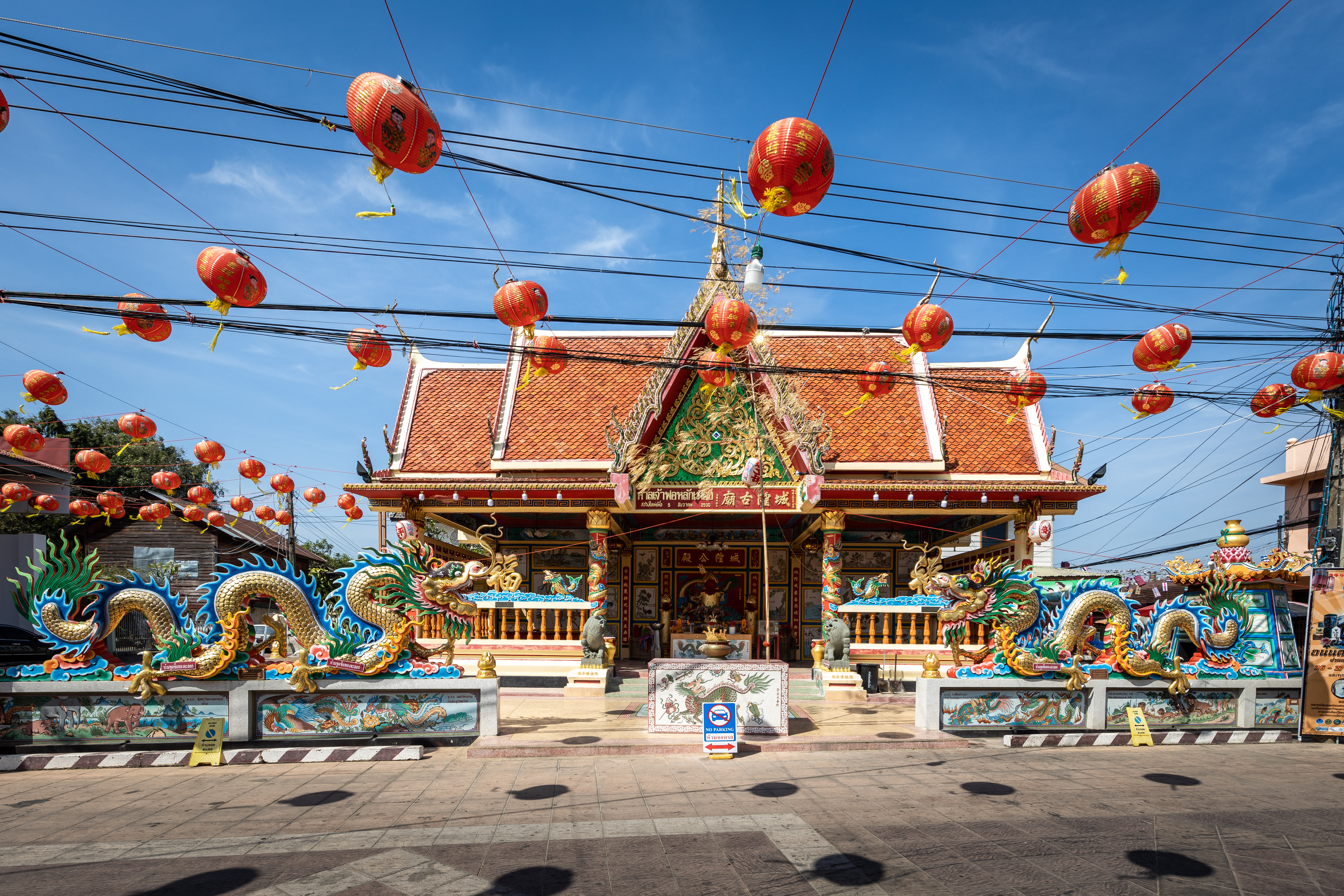
Yasothon

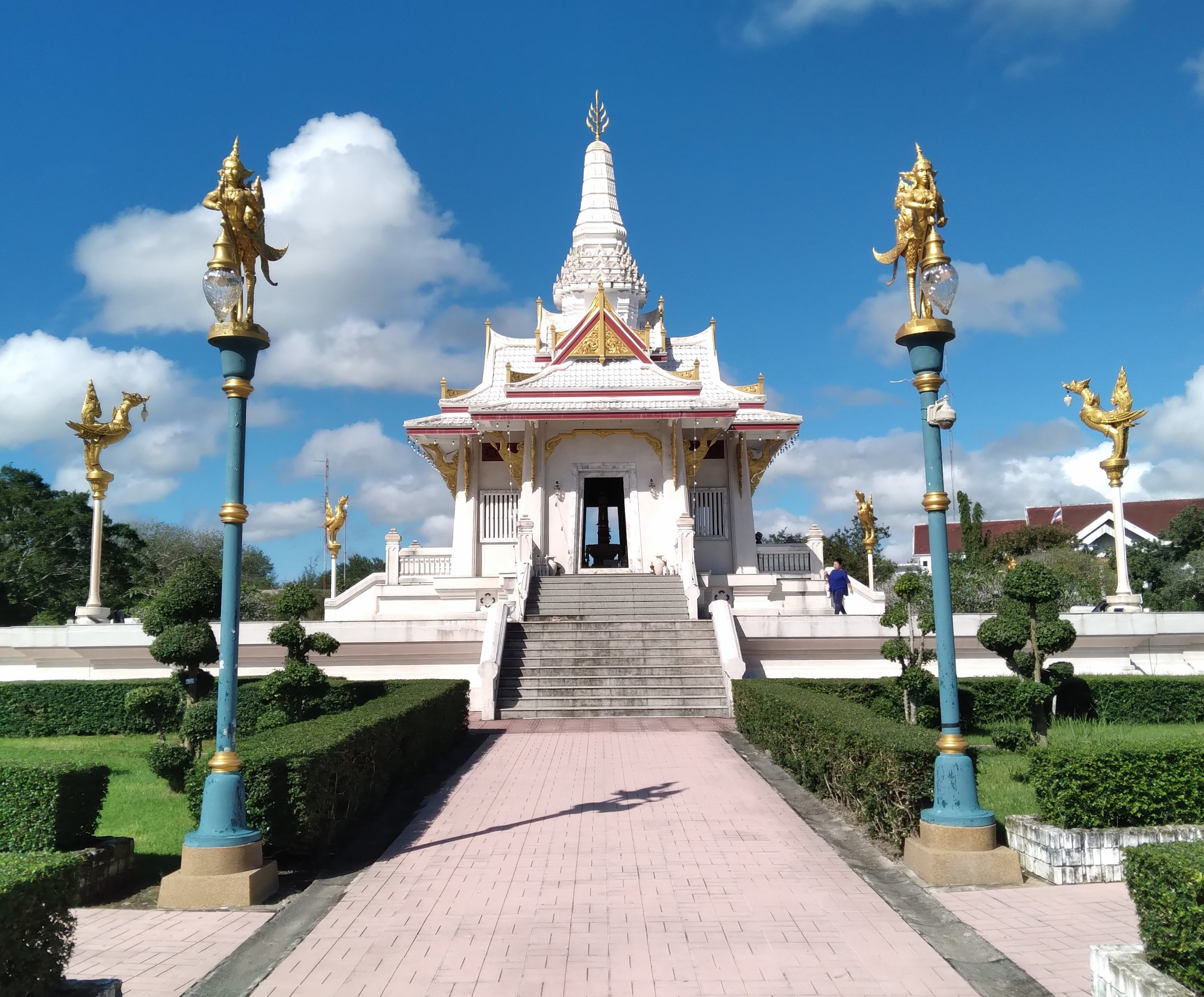
Yala

== See also ==
- Spirit house
- Genius loci
