= Wat Phra That Doi Chom Thong =

Buddhist temple in Chiang Rai province, Thailand

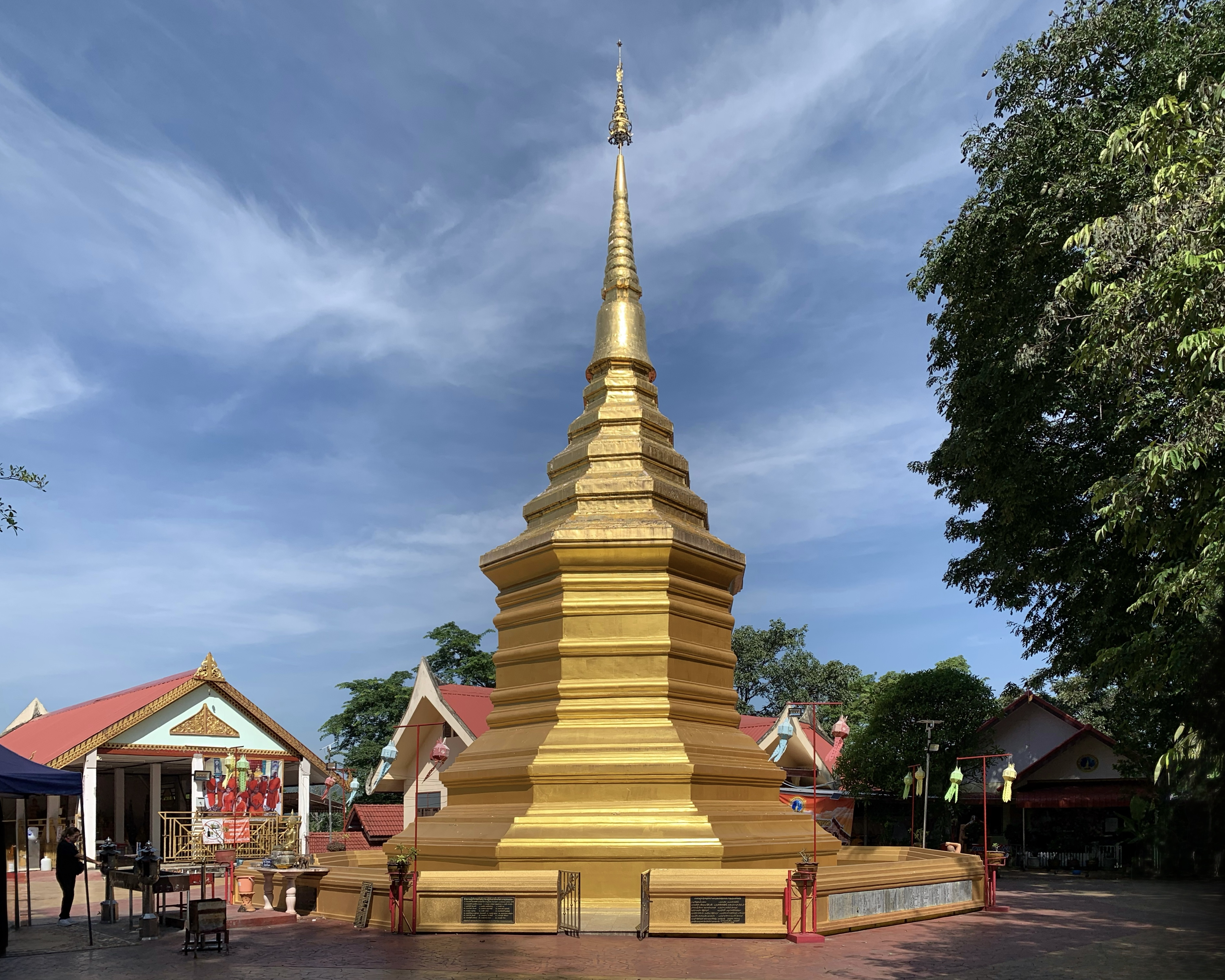
Doi Chom Thong Phra That Pagoda

Wat Phra That Doi Chom Thong (Thai: วัดพระธาตุดอยจอมทอง) (also known as Wat Phra That Doi Jom Thong) is located in Nakhon Chiang Rai, Amphoe Mueang, Chiang Rai Province, Thailand.

== History ==
Doi Chom Thong has undoubtedly been a sacred site for a very long time. The site was surely revered as the home of local spirits before Buddhism arrived in the area. As in many Thai wats, Spirit Houses coexist happily with the newer Buddhist shrines. Elephants are part of the lore of Doi Chom Thong. Paw Kuhn Mangrai was said to have been following an elephant that had wandered off when he first came upon Doi Chom Thong, a solitary hill on the banks of the River Kok.

There is a Chedi or golden pagoda of Stupa located in the center of the wat. The Chedi is the focal point of the temple. The Chedi was constructed with a mixture of Bhu-kam (ancient Burma) and Lanna style. It is around 14 meters high, the lotus-petal base, the body, the bell, the top part of the Chedi were decorated with a gold foil.

According to the Yonok Chronicle, the That or Chedi originally was built in 940 during the reign of Phraya Ruen Kaew, Prince of Chiang Rai, to house the Lord Buddha's relics.

Those relics were originally acquired by Prince Pangkaraj of Yonok Nakpan, who divided them into three parts for the three temples of Wat Phra That Doi Tung, Wat Phra That Chomkitti, and Wat Phra That Doi Chom Thong, respectively.

Later, in 1260, King Mangrai was said to have visited Doi Chom Thong, where he viewed the surrounding area and found it suitable for the establishment of a city. He then ordered the beginning of the construction of the city of Chiang Rai and had Wat Phra That Doi Chom Thong restored.

In 1992 (B.E. 2535) the City Pillar was moved from Wat Klang Wiang to Doi Chom Thong, where it is known as Sadu Mueang (TH: สะดือเมือง), the Navel or Omphalos of the city.

== Gallery ==
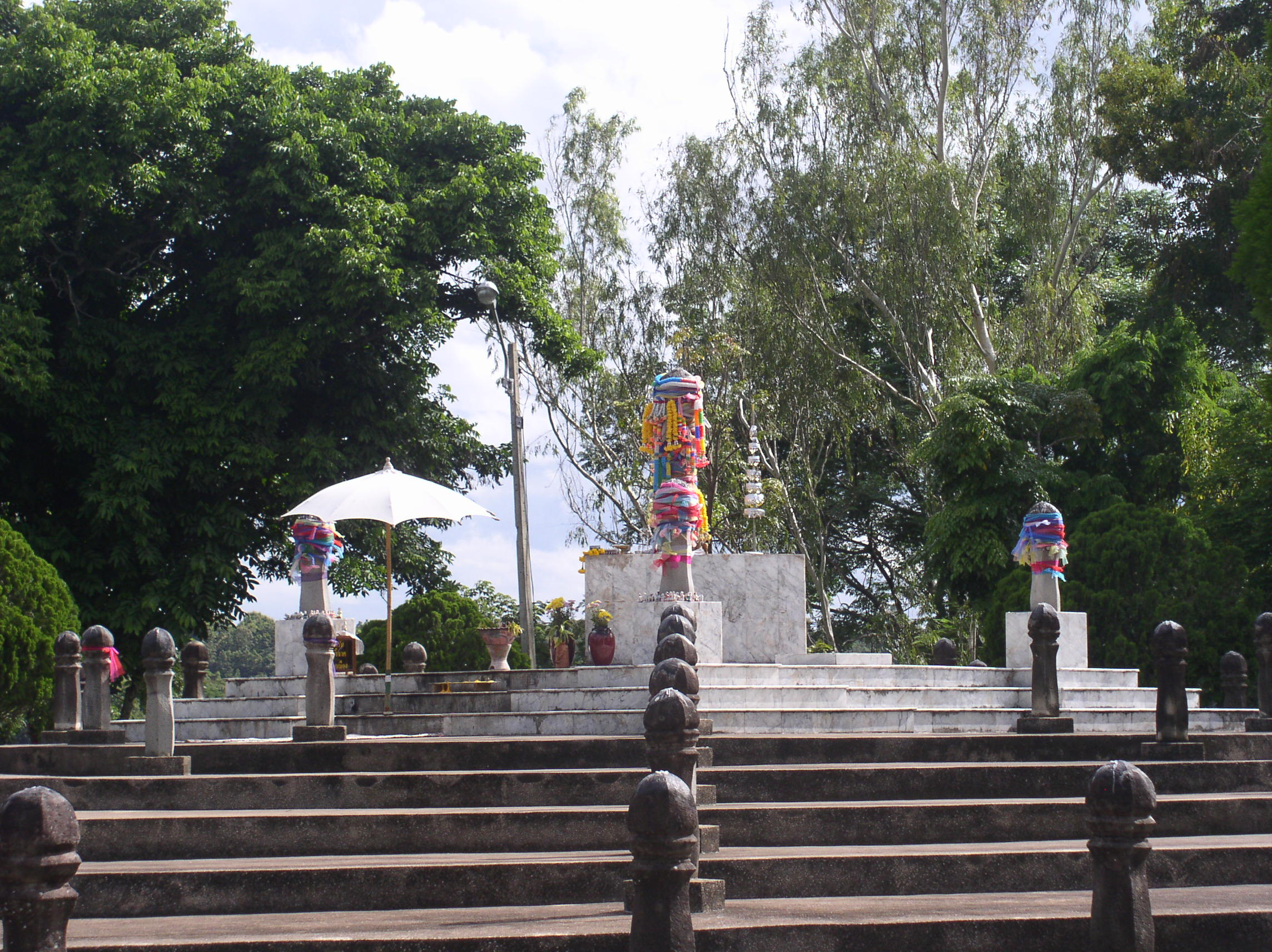
Sadu Mueang at Doi Chom Thong, Chiang Rai

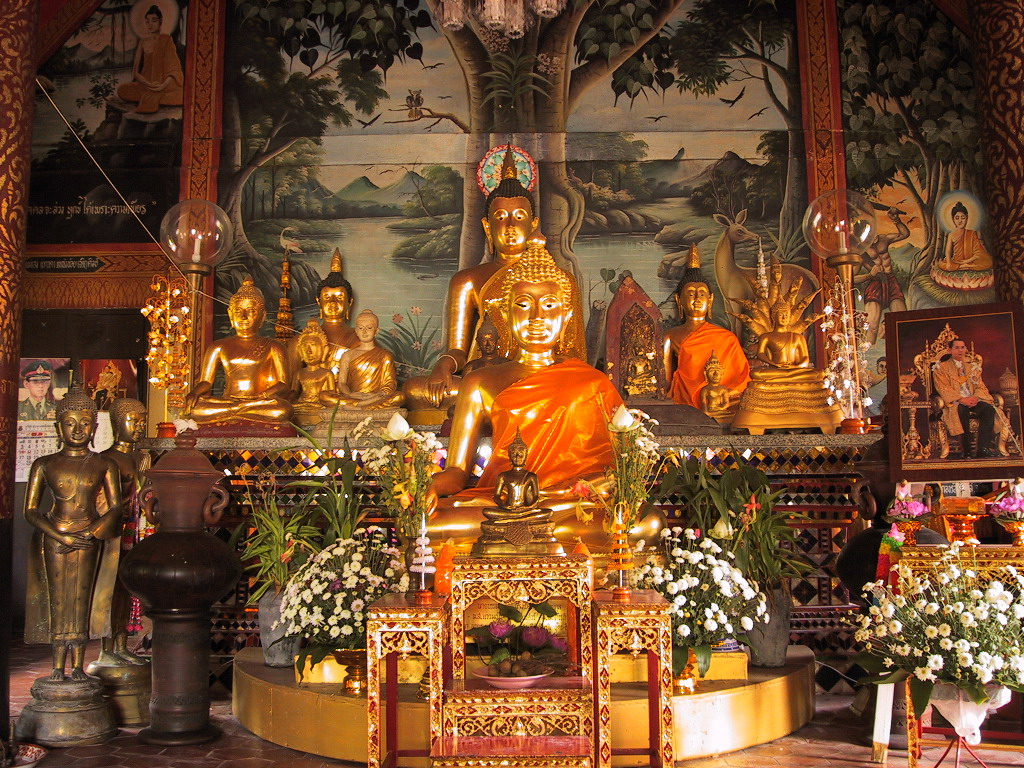
The major buddha image in "Viharn" or the Grand Hall

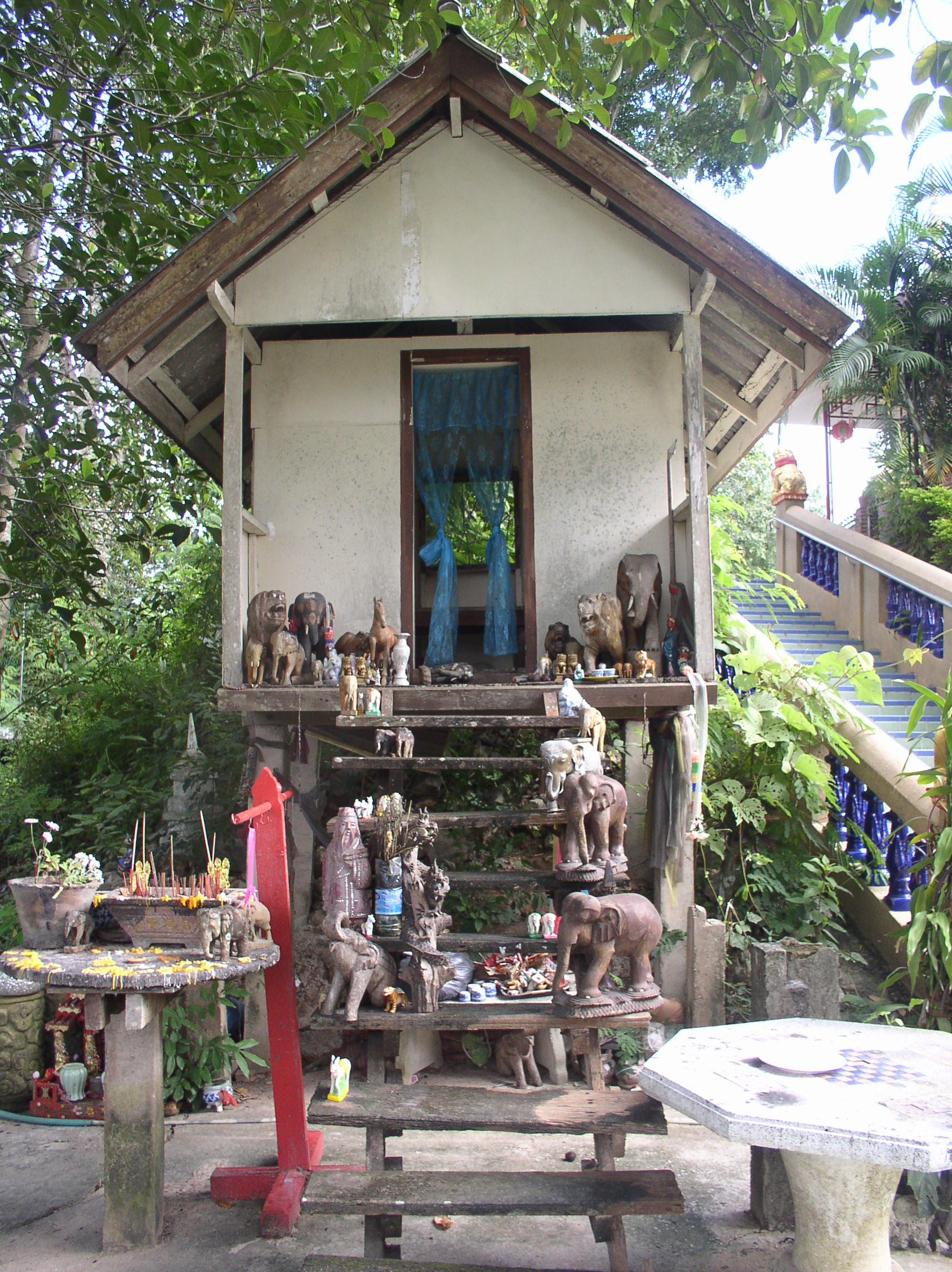
San Phra Jao at Chom Thong, Chiang Rai
