= Wat =

Buddhist or Hindu temple in Asia

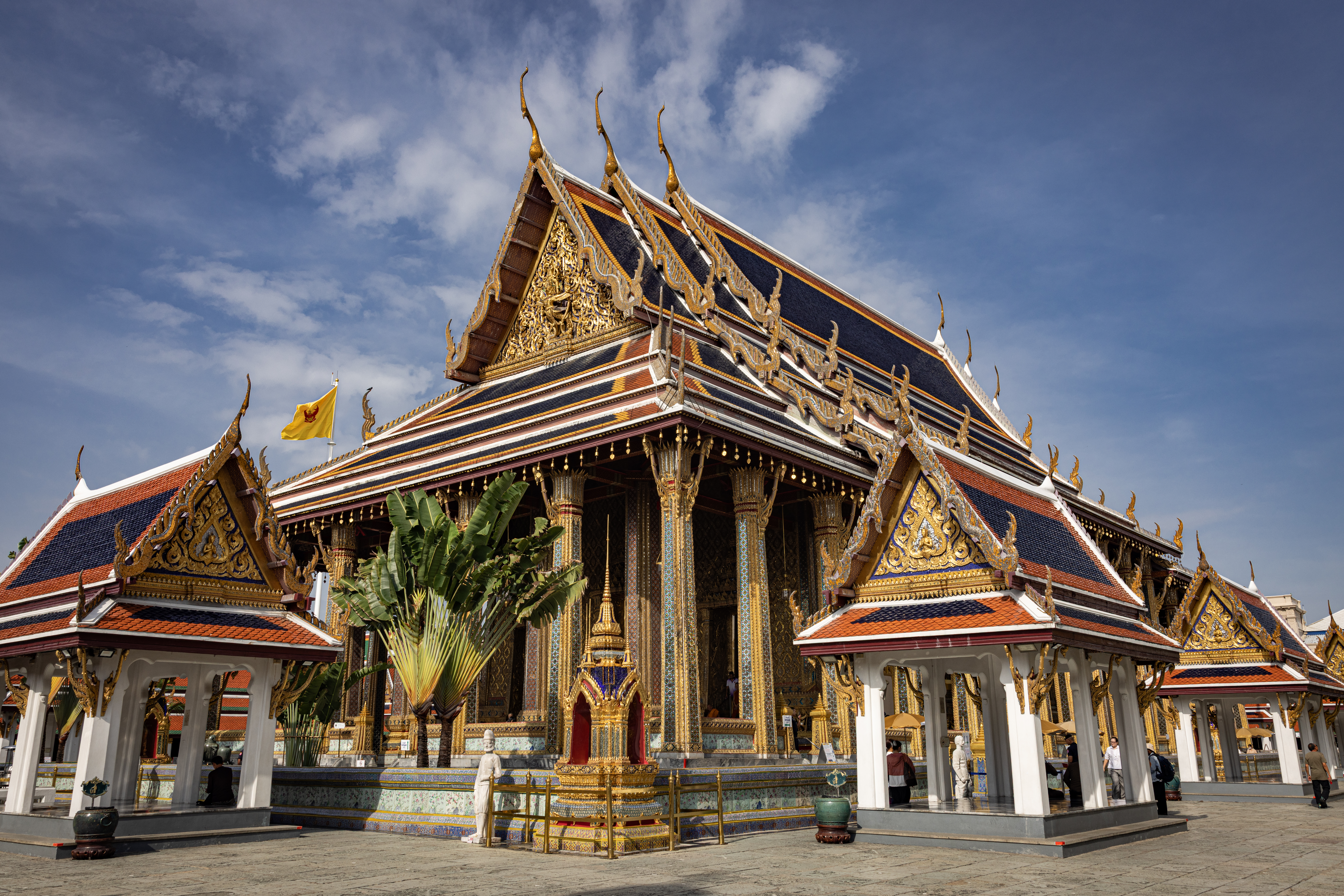
Wat Phra Kaew
Bangkok, Thailand

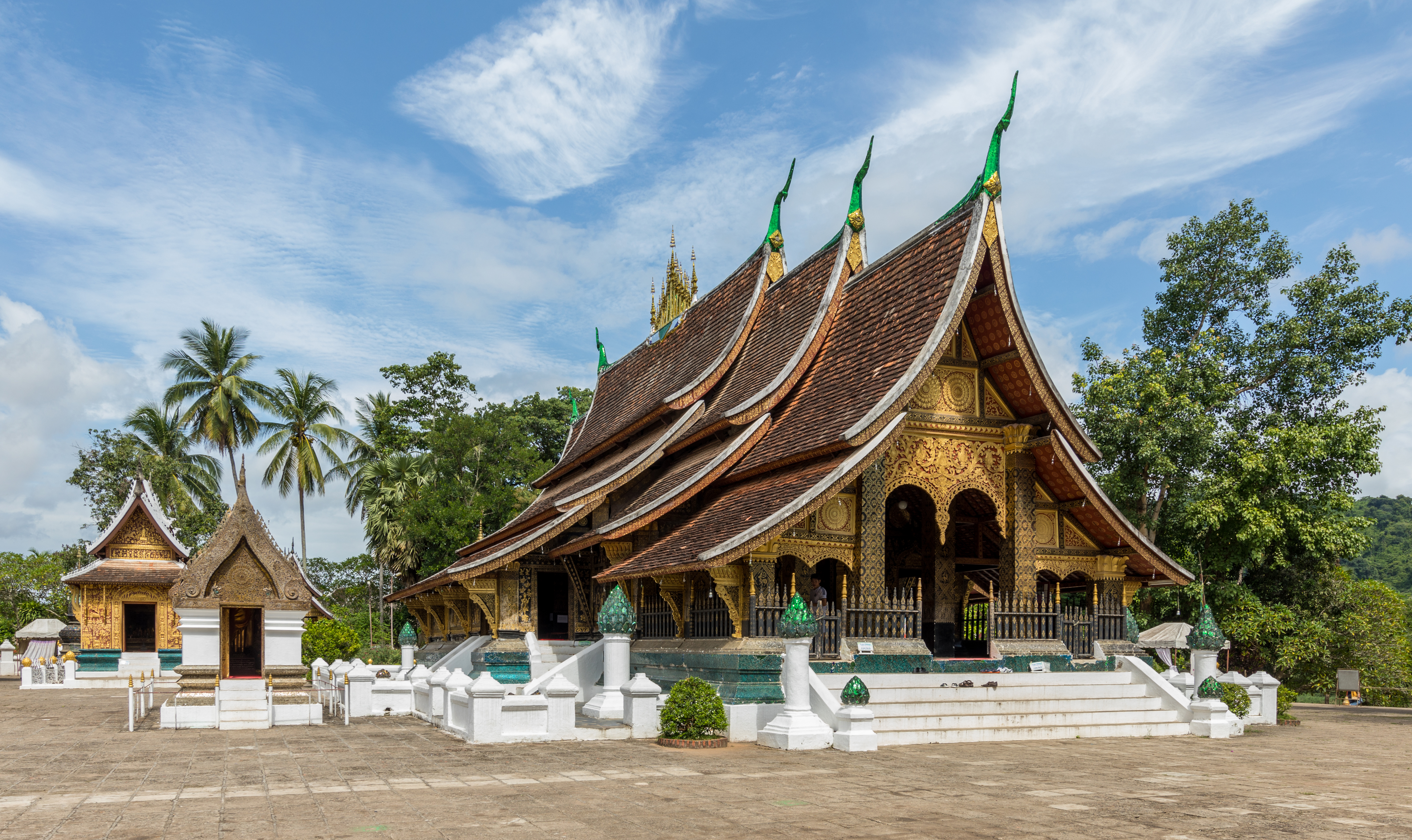
Wat Xieng Thong
Luang Prabang, Laos

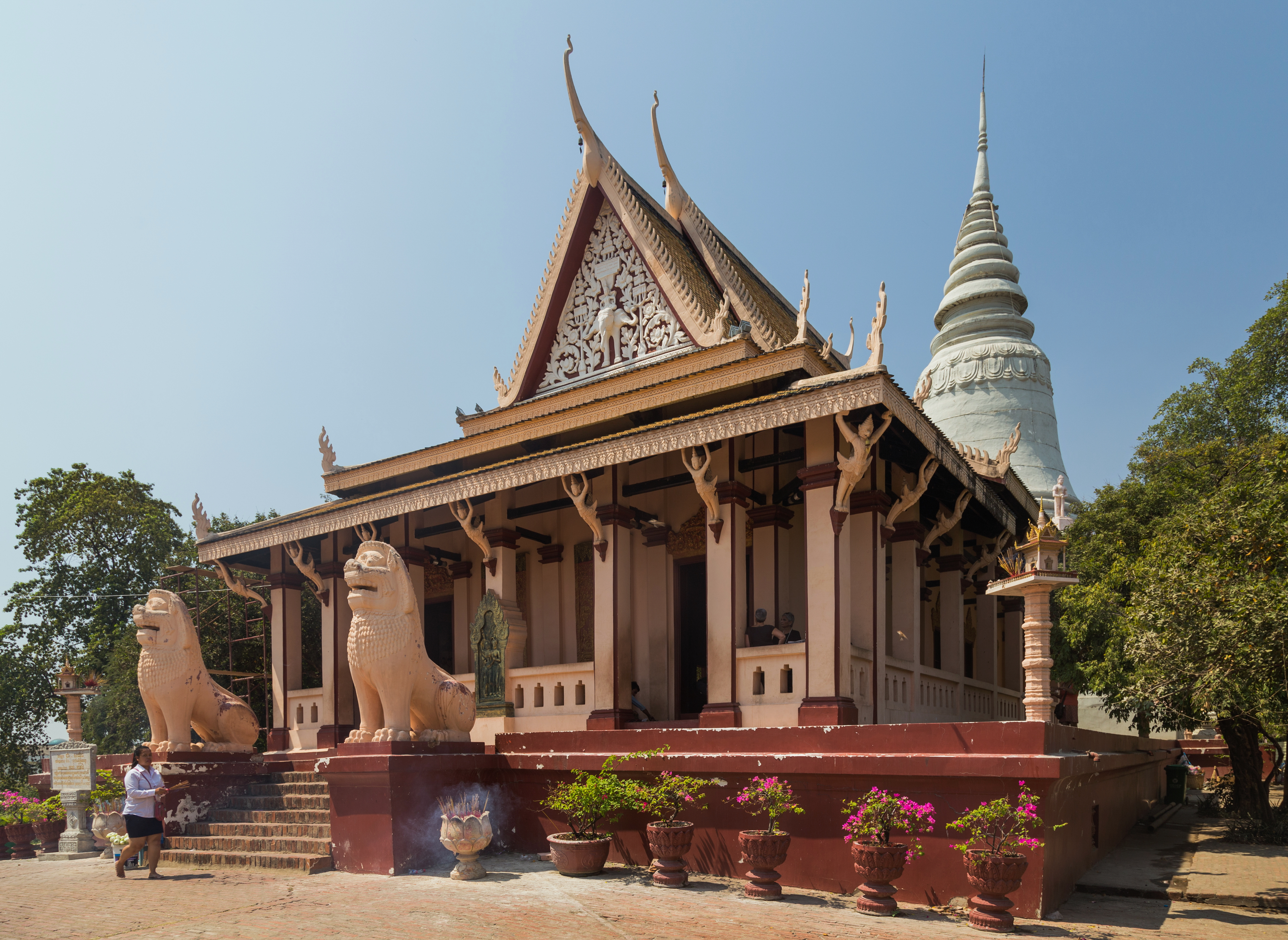
Wat Phnom
Phnom Penh, Cambodia

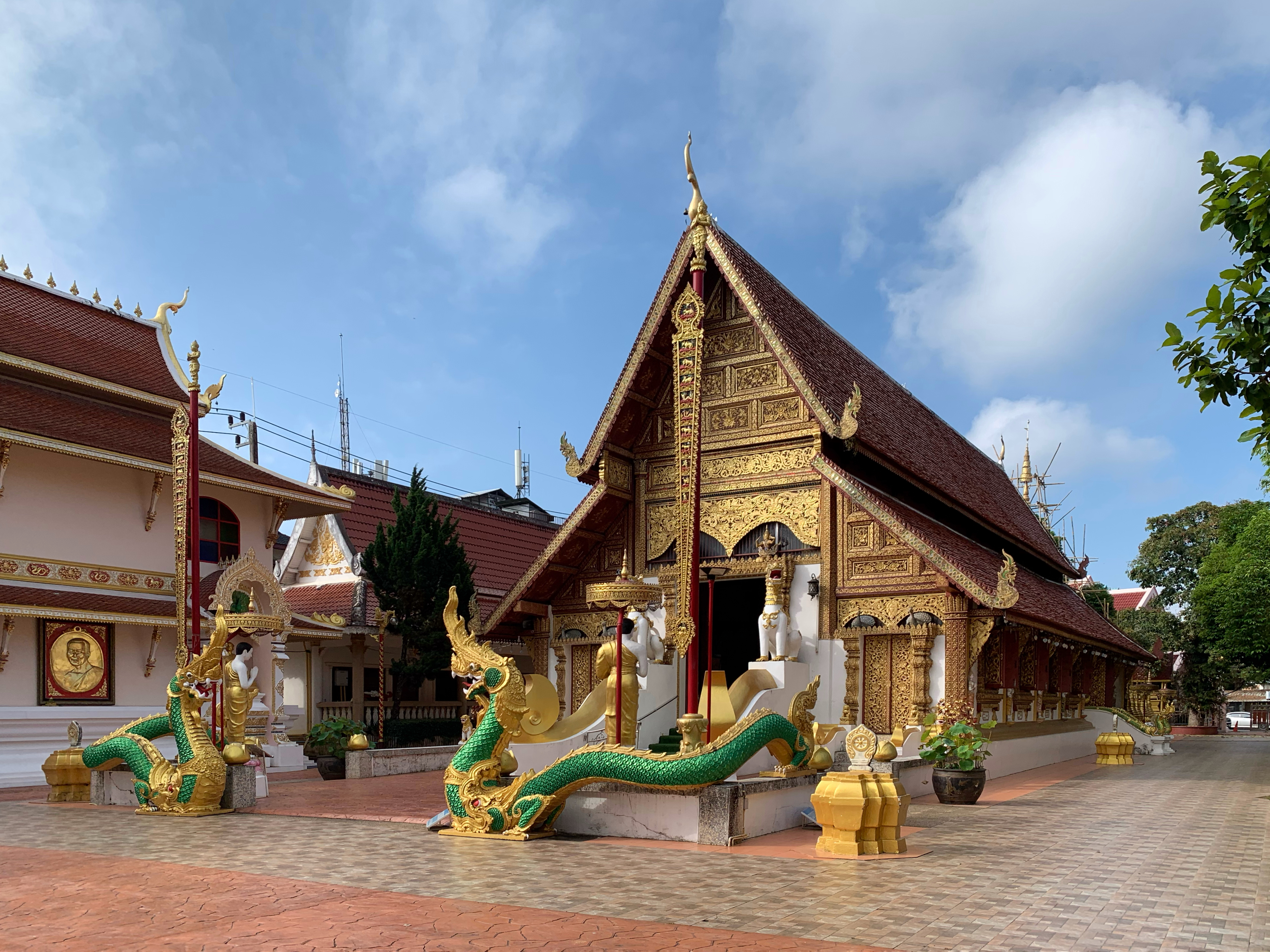
Wat Phra Singh
Chiang Rai, Thailand

A wat is a type of Buddhist and Hindu temple in Cambodia, Laos, East Shan State (Myanmar), Yunnan (China), the Southern Province of Sri Lanka, and Thailand.

== Etymology ==
The word wat is borrowed from the Sanskrit vāṭa (Devanāgarī: वाट), meaning "enclosure". The term has varying meanings in each region, sometimes referring to a specific type of government-recognised or large temple, other times referring to any Buddhist or Hindu temple. In the local languages it is known as — Khmer: វត្ត, vôtt [ʋɔət]; Lao: ວັດ, vat [wāt]; Thai: วัด, RTGS: wat [wát]; Tai Lü: 「ᩅᨯ᩠ᨰ」(waD+Dha); Northern Thai: 「ᩅ᩠ᨯ᩶」(w+Da2), [wa̋t]; Tamil: வாட், vāṭ.

== Overview ==
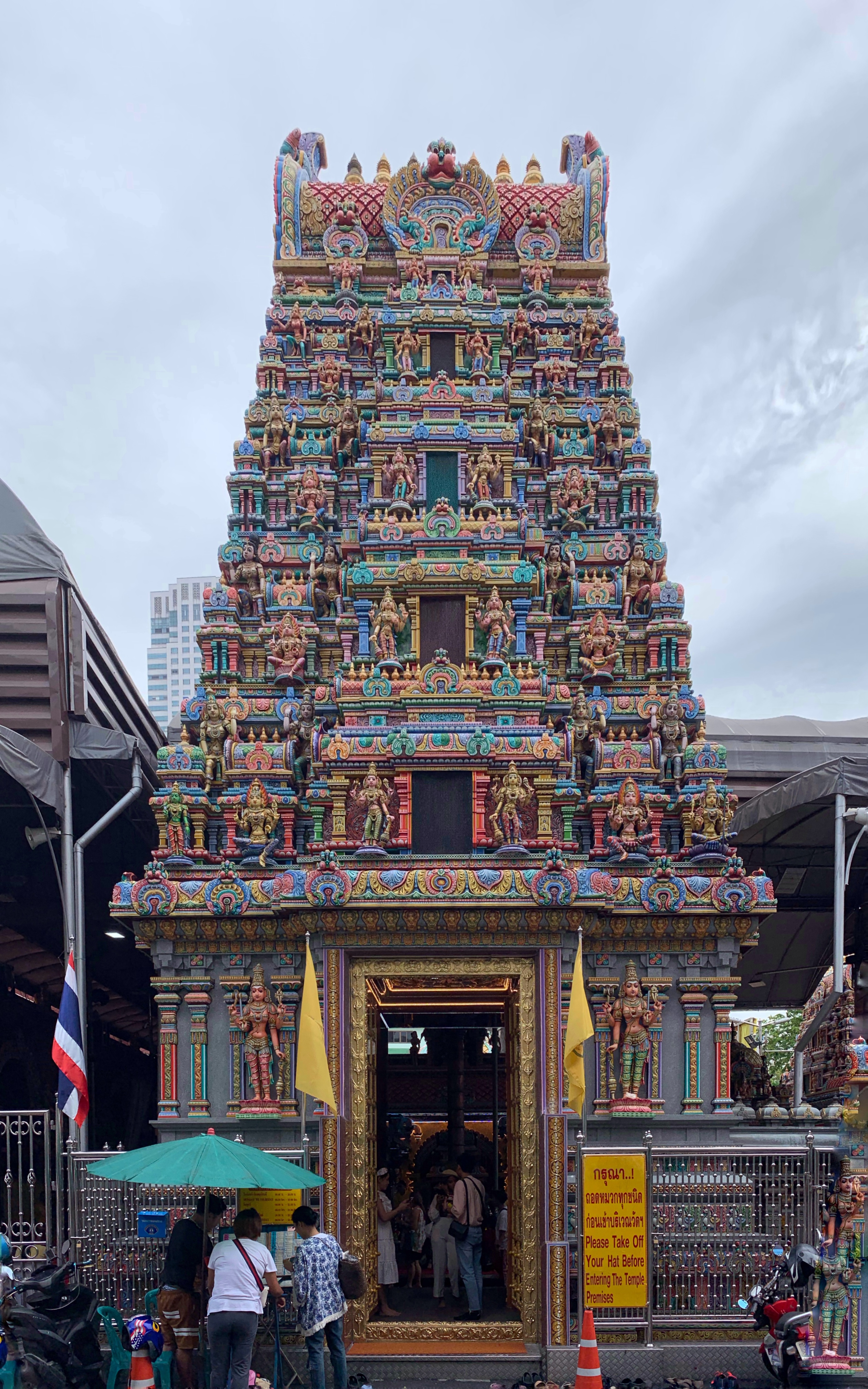
Mariamman Temple, a Hindu temple in Bangkok, is more commonly called Wat Kheak

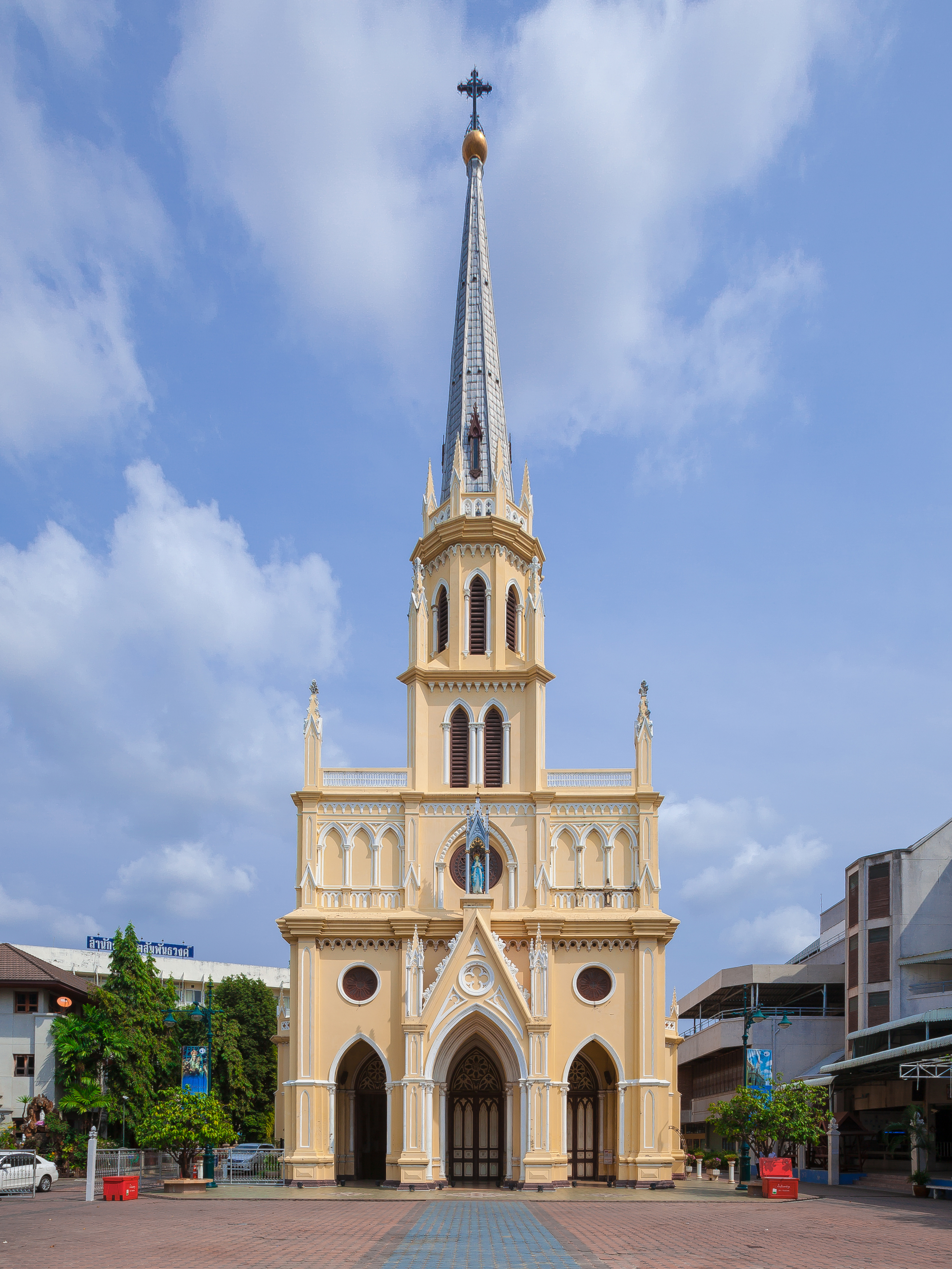
Kalawar Church, a Catholic church in Bangkok, is also commonly called Wat Kalawar

Usage of the term in Thailand beyond Buddhist temples

In Buddhism, a wat is a Buddhist sacred precinct with vihara, a temple, an edifice housing a large image of Buddha and a facility for lessons. A site without a minimum of three resident bhikkhus cannot correctly be described as a wat although the term is frequently used more loosely, even for ruins of ancient temples. As a transitive or intransitive verb, wat means to measure, to take measurements; compare templum, from which temple derives, having the same root as template.

In Cambodia, a wat is any place of worship. "Wat" generally refers to a Buddhist place of worship, but the precise term is vôtt pŭtthsasnéa (វត្តពុទ្ធសាសនា) meaning "Buddhist pagoda". "Angkor Wat" (អង្គរវត្ត ângkôr vôtt) means 'city of temples'.

In everyday language in Thailand, a "wat" is any place of worship except a mosque (Thai: สุเหร่า; RTGS: surao; or Thai: มัสยิด; RTGS: matsayit) or a synagogue (Thai: โบสถ์ยิว; RTGS: bot yio). Thus, a wat chin (วัดจีน; lit. 'Chinese temple') or san chao (ศาลเจ้า; lit. 'shrine') is a Chinese temple (either Buddhist or Taoist), wat khaek (วัดแขก; lit. 'Indian temple') or thewasathan (เทวสถาน; from Sanskrit: devasathān) is a Hindu temple, wat sik (Thai: วัดซิกข์; lit. 'Sikh temple' is a Gurdwara, and bot khrit (โบสถ์คริสต์) or wat farang (วัดฝรั่ง; lit. 'Farang temple') is a Christian church, though Thai โบสถ์ (RTGS: bot) may be used descriptively as with mosques.

== Types ==
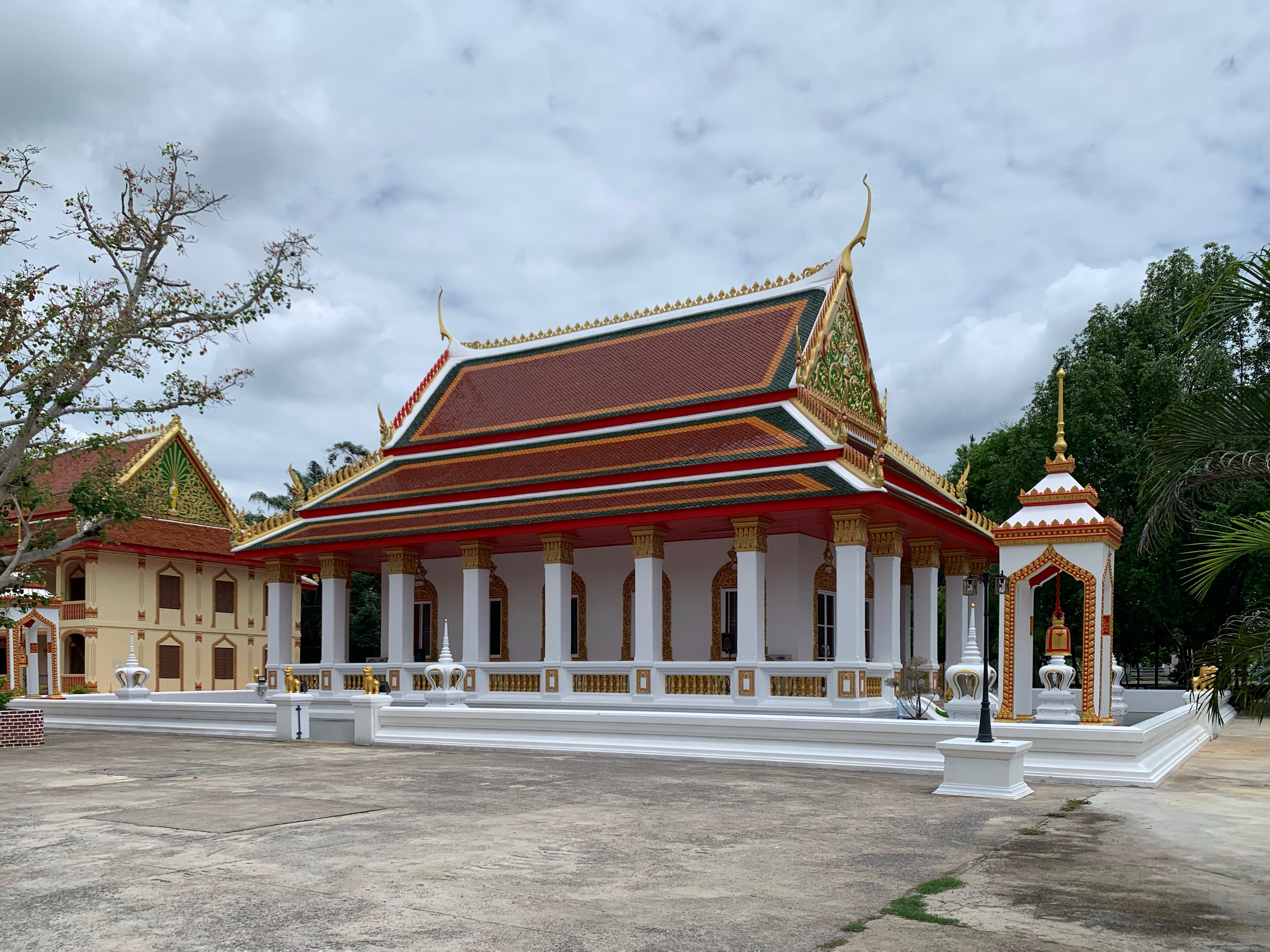
Wat Udom Thani, Nakhon Nayok is a royal temple

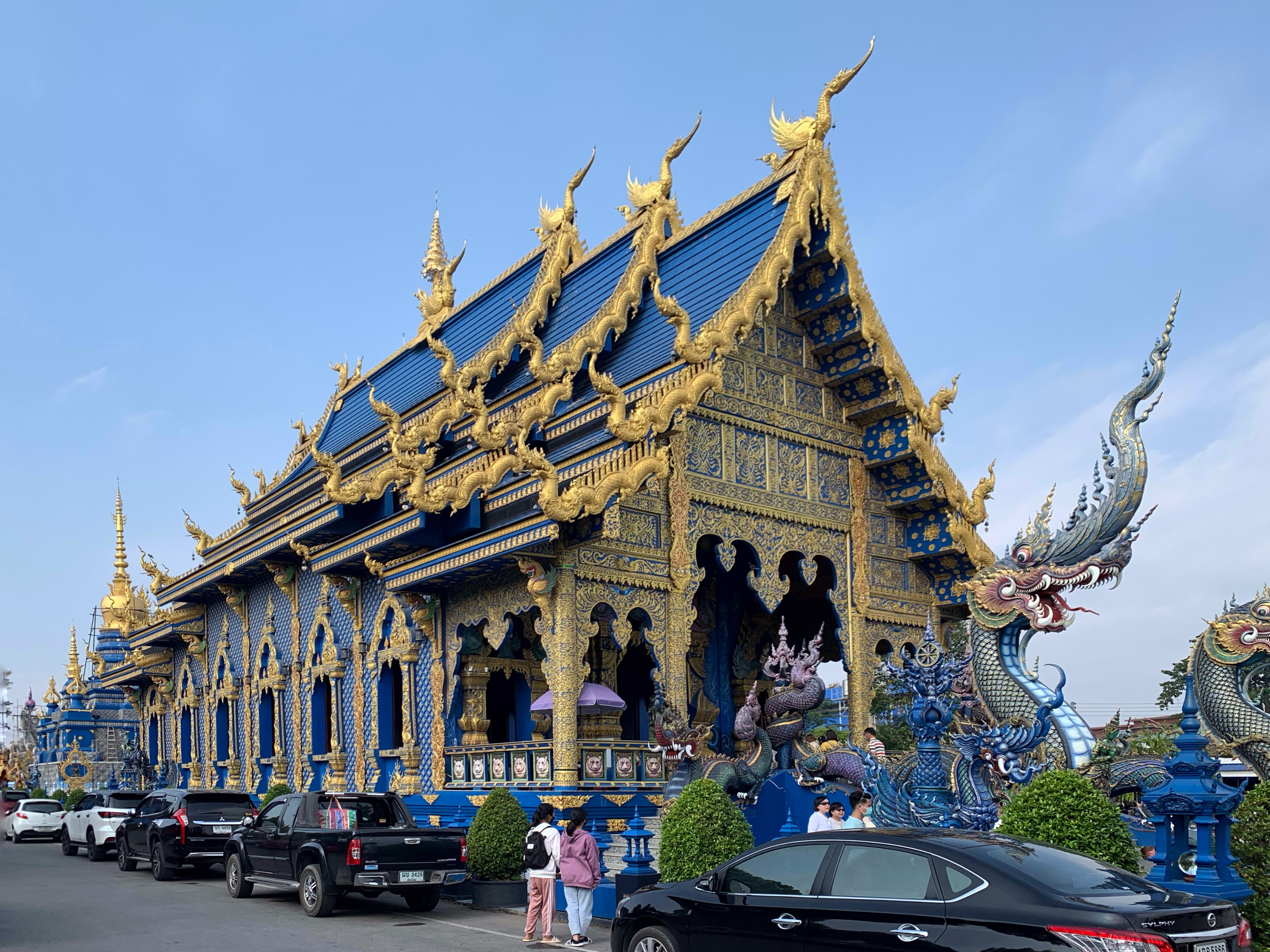
Wat Rong Suea Ten, Chiang Rai is a public temple

According to Thai law, there are two types of Thai Buddhist temples:

- Wats (วัด; wat) are temples which have been endorsed by the state and have been granted Visungkhamsima (วิสุงคามสีมา), or the land for establishing central hall, by the king. These temples are divided into:
  - Royal temples (Thai: พระอารามหลวง; RTGS: phra aram luang): established or patronised by the king or his family members.
  - Public temples (Thai: วัดราษฎร์; RTGS: wat rat): established by private citizens. Despite the term "private", private temples are open to the public and are sites of public religious activities.
- Samnak song (Thai: สำนักสงฆ์): are temples or monasteries without state endorsement and wisungkhamasima. For example, Wat Tham Krabok in Phra Phutthabat was established as a samnak song in 1975 and was granted a wat status in 2012.

== Structure ==
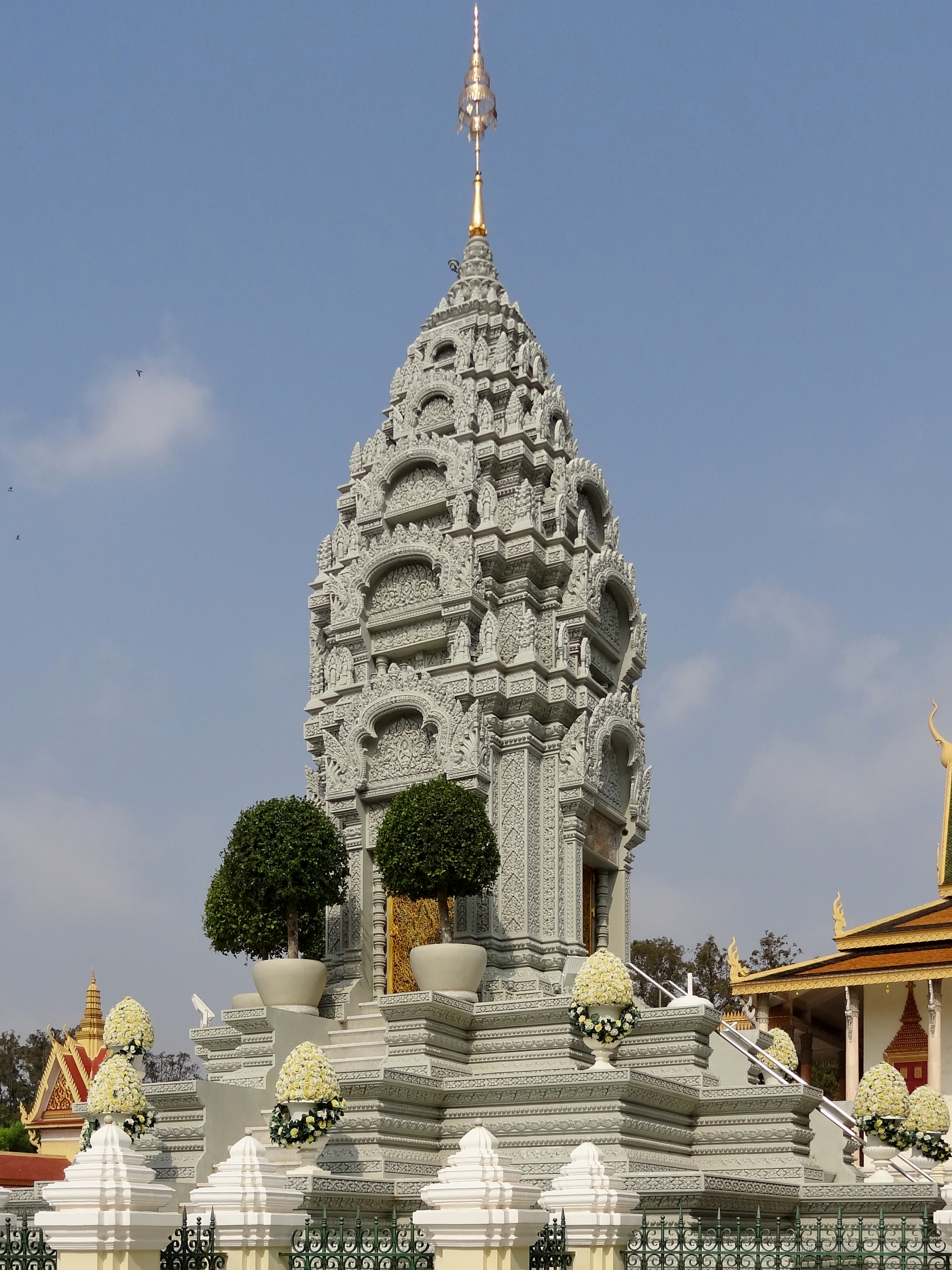
Royal stupa (preăh chêdei) of Kuntha Bopha was built by using Khmer architectural style during the Angkor period in the form of temple shrine, Silver Pagoda, Phnom Penh

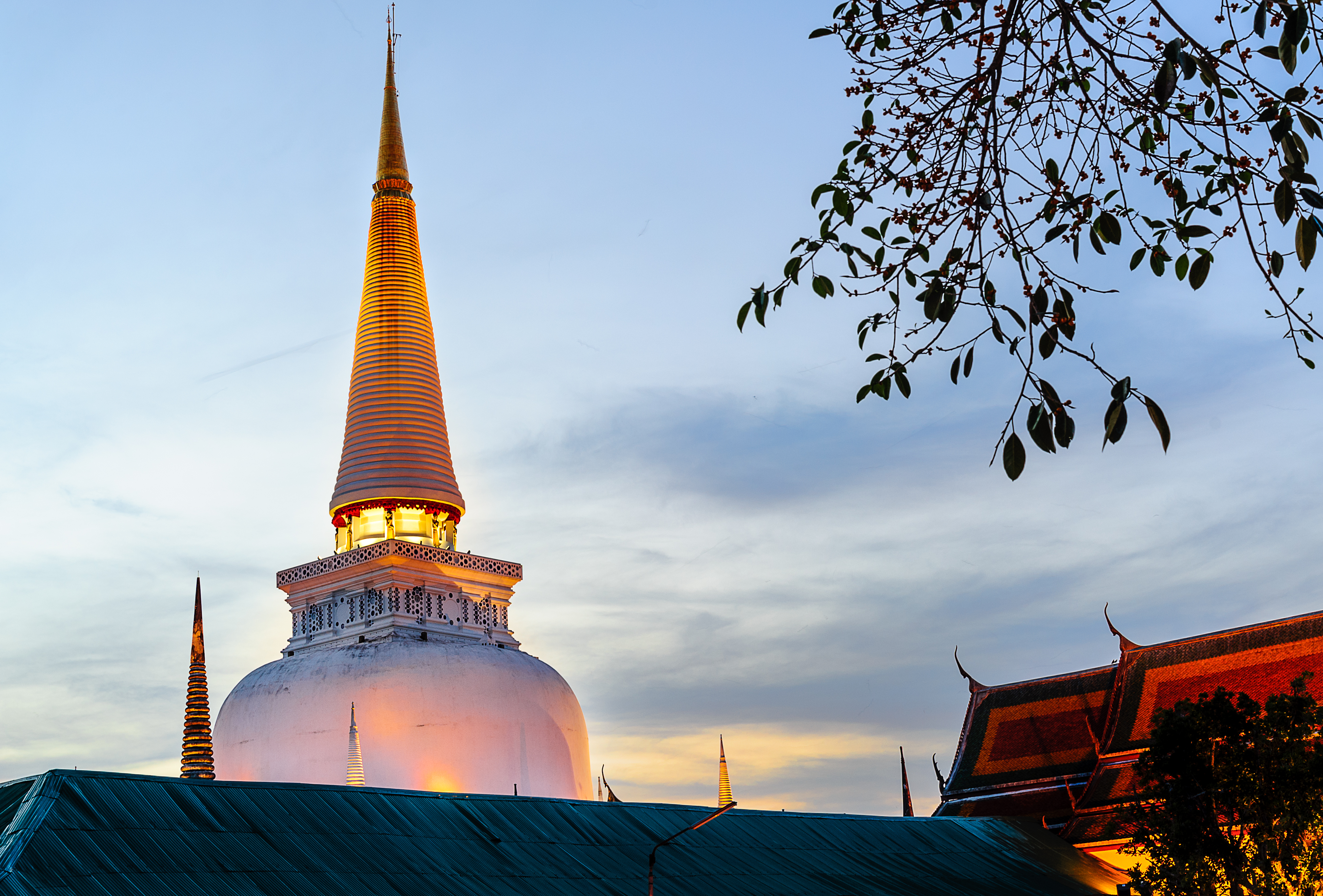
The main chedi in Wat Phra Mahathat, Nakhon Si Thammarat

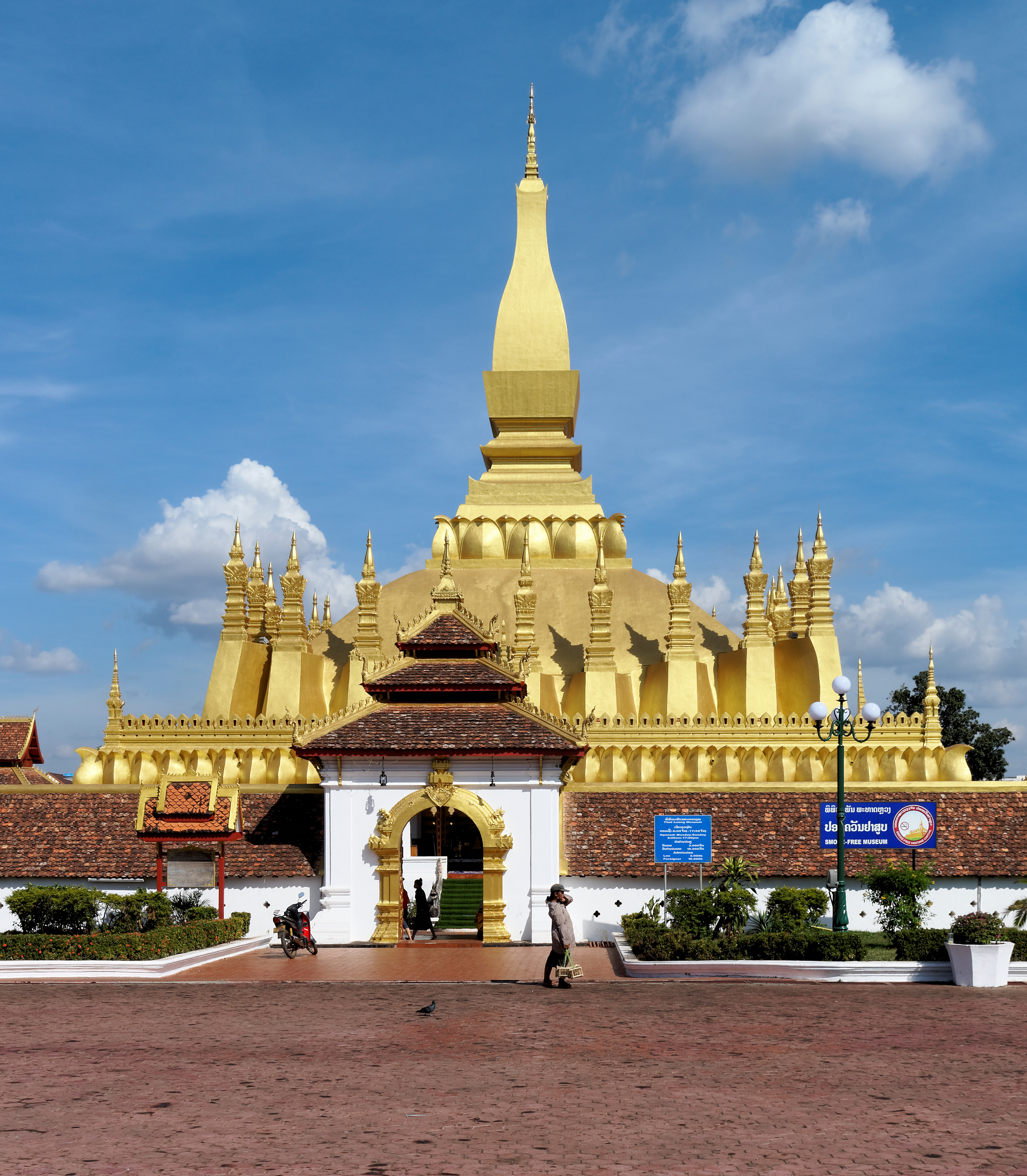
Pha That Luang, Vientiane, Laos

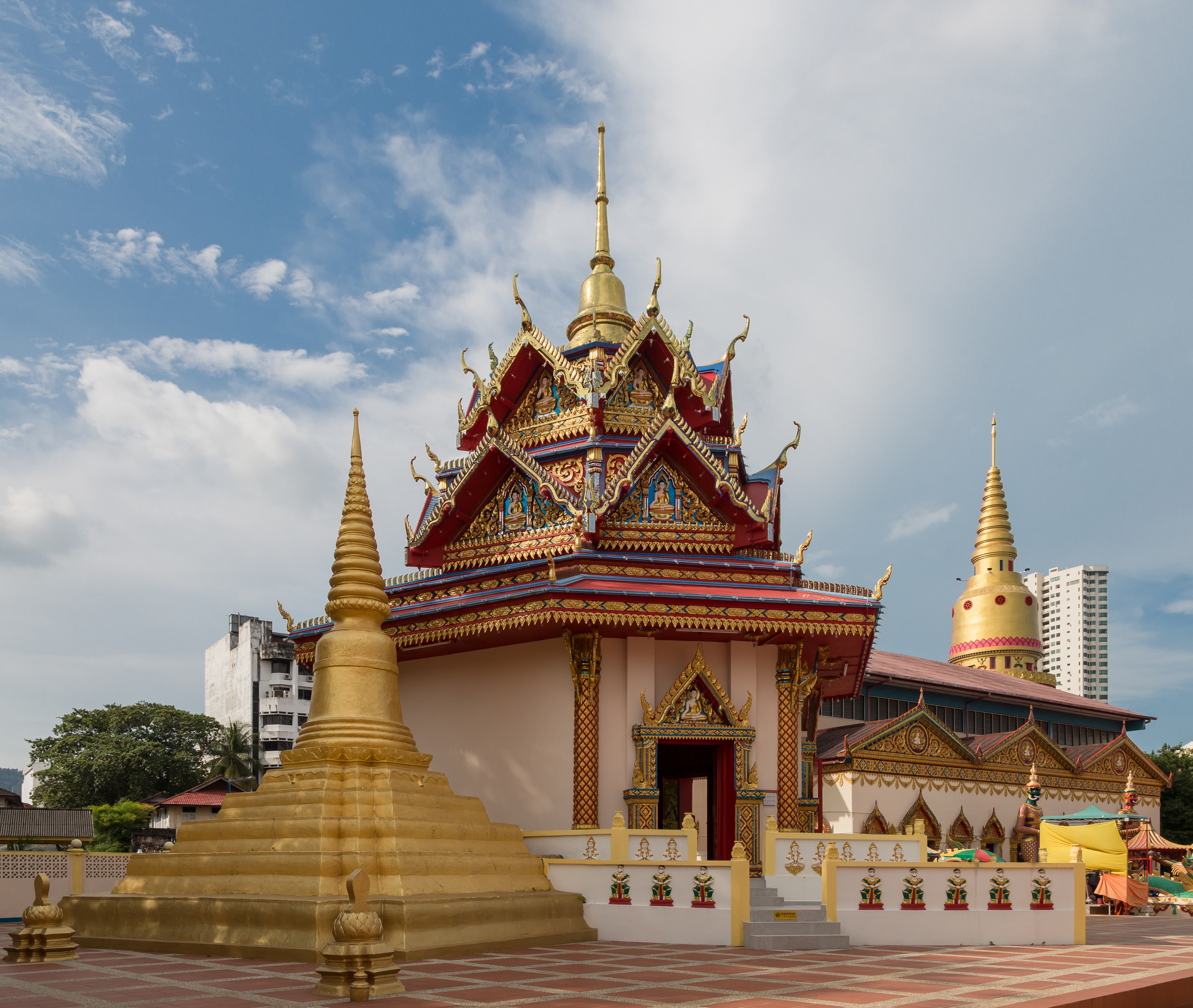
Wat Chaiyamangkalaram, George Town, Malaysia

A typical Buddhist wat consists of the following buildings:

- Bell tower (Khmer: ប៉មជួង, pâm chuŏng [pɑːm cuəŋ]; Lao: ຫໍລະຄັງ; Thai: หอระฆัง)
- Bot (Thai: โบสถ์) or ubosot (Lao: ອຸໂປສົດ; Thai: อุโบสถ; from Pali uposatha) or sim (Lao: ສິມ): the holiest prayer room, also called the "ordination hall" as it is where new monks take their vows. Architecturally it is similar to the vihara. The main difference is the eight cornerstones placed around the bot to ward off evil. The bot is usually more decorated than the wihan. In Cambodia nowadays, this type of building is considered to be Vihear. It was previously called Ubaosathakea or Rorng Ubaosoth (Khmer: ឧបោសថាគារ ឬ រោងឧបោសថ).
- Chedei (Khmer: ចេតិយ) or Chedi (Thai: เจดีย์; Lao: ເຈດີ) from Sanskrit: chaitya, temple or that (Lao: ທາດ): It is also known as a Stupa (Thai: สถูป). Usually conical or bell-shaped buildings, but many Cambodian stupas are constructed in the style of temple shrine. They often contain relics of Buddha. The urns containing the ashes of the cremated dead are kept here and serve as memorials for those ancestors.
- Chantakhara (Thai: ชันตาฆร): a room in which fire and water are kept.
- Drum tower (Khmer: រោងស្គរ; Lao: ຫໍກອງ; Thai: หอกลอง)
- Hong Song Nam (Thai: ห้องสรงน้ำ): toilet.
- Ho trai (Khmer: ហោត្រ័យ; Lao: ຫໍໄຕ; Thai: หอไตร): library where Buddhist texts are kept.
- Kappapiya Kudi (Thai: กัปปิยกุฎี) utility and storage room.
- Kod (Khmer: កុដិ), Kut, Kutti, Kuti or Kati (Lao: ກຸຕິ, ກະຕິ; Thai: กุฏิ): the living quarters of monks (bhikkhus) separated from the sacred buildings.
- Mondop (Khmer: មណ្ឌប; Thai: มณฑป; from Sanskrit: Mandapa): usually an open, square building with four arches and a pyramidal roof, used to worship religious texts or objects.
- Pond (Khmer: ស្រះ - Srah; Lao: ສະນ້ໍາ Sa Nam; Thai: สระน้ำ Sa Nam): is rectangular in shape and sometimes decorated with lotus flowers, the emblematic flower of Buddhism. In addition, some wats illustrate the figure of Buddha being sheltered by a seven headed naga, named Mucalinda (Khmer: មុជ្ជលិន្ទ), in the middle of the pond. The pond itself is called Mucalinda Pond.
- Sala (Khmer: សាលា; Lao: ສາລາ; Thai: ศาลา; from the Sanskrit word शाला (IAST: śālā), cognate of Hindi शाल, meaning hall, large room or shed. A pavilion for relaxation and miscellaneous activities. In Cambodia, the sala also serves as the Buddhist educational center in a wat, but not every wat has one. It can be found outside the wat proper.
  - Oupadthan Sala or Sala Bonn (Khmer: ឧបដ្ឋានសាលា ឬ សាលាបុណ្យ) or Sala Wat (Thai: ศาลาวัด): a hall for people gathering together to make a donation or for ceremonies.
  - Sala Baley or Sala Putthikakseksa (Khmer: សាលាបាលី ឬ សាលាពុទ្ធិកសិក្សា): literally means 'Pali school' or 'Buddhist educational school', is the place to teach Buddhist Dharma and other subjects in both Pali and Khmer languages. Sala Baley is divided into three levels. They are: Buddhist elementary school (Khmer: ពុទ្ធិកបឋមសិក្សា Putthikakpathamaseksa); Buddhist high school (Khmer: ពុទ្ធិកវិទ្យាល័យ - Putthikakvityealay); and Buddhist university (Khmer: ពុទ្ធិកសកលវិទ្យាល័យ Putthikaksakalvityealay). Beside Buddhist Dharma, Buddhist university includes subjects such as philosophy, science, information technology, Sanskrit, and other foreign languages. These schools may be constructed outside the wat and laypersons are also permitted to study there.
  - Sala Chhann (Khmer: សាលាឆាន់), Sala Bat (Thai: ศาลาบาตร), or Ho Chan (Thai: หอฉัน): cafeteria for monks.
  - Sala Chhatean (Khmer: សាលាឆទាន), Sala Klang Yan (Thai: ศาลากลางย่าน) or Sala Rong Tham (Lao: ສາລາໂຮງທໍາ; Thai: ศาลาโรงธรรม): is usually smaller than other halls and can be built outside the wat, especially along the roads or even in the center of villages. It is used to celebrate Buddhist events as well as for dining and relaxation.
  - Sala Kan Parian (Thai: ศาลาการเปรียญ) or Ho Chaek (Lao: ຫໍແຈກ; Thai: หอแจก): study hall, In the past this hall was restricted to monks.
  - Sala Song (Thai: ศาลาสรง): the room where monks receive holy water blessings.
  - Sala Thormmasaphear or Thormmasala (Khmer: សាលាធម្មសភា ឬ ធម្មសាលា), Sala Fang Tham (Thai: ศาลาฟังธรรม): Dharma assembly pavilion, however some assume this hall to be Sala Bonn.
  - Sala Tha Nam (Thai: ศาลาท่าน้ำ): pier pavilion.
- Vihear (Khmer: វិហារ) or wihan (Lao: ວິຫານ; Thai: วิหาร) from Sanskrit: vihara: a meeting and prayer room.
- Wachak Kod (Khmer: វច្ចកុដិ) or Watcha Kudi (Thai: วัจจกุฎี) or than (Lao: ຖານ; Thai: ถาน): toilet.

Almost all Buddhist temples in Cambodia were built in Khmer architectural style. Most temples were finely decorated with a spiked tower (bosbok) (Khmer: បុស្បុក)(some temples have three or five spiked towers; some have none) on the rooftop along with pediments, naga heads, and chovear (Khmer: ជហ្វា) (a decorative ridge-piece that is placed at each topmost edge of the roof, just above the tip of each pediment). Below the edge of the roof and at the top of external columns, garuda or kinnari figures are depicted supporting the roof. There are a pair of guardian lions and one head or several (three, five, seven, or nine). naga sculptures are beside each entrance of the temple. Inside the main temple (vihara) and the multipurpose hall (lunch hall), mural paintings depict the life of Gautama Buddha and his previous life.

The roofs of Thai temples are often adorned with chofas.

== Examples ==
Some well-known wats include:

=== Cambodia ===
At the end of 2017, there were 4,872 wats with 69,199 Buddhist monks supporting Buddhism in Cambodia. By 2019, it was illustrated that 97.1 percent of the Cambodian population was Buddhist, making Cambodia to be one of the most predominant Buddhist nations in the world.

- Angkor Wat, Siem Reap
- Wat Preah Keo, Phnom Penh
- Wat Botum Vattey, Phnom Penh
- Wat Moha Montrey, Phnom Penh
- Wat Ounalaom, Phnom Penh
- Wat Phnom, Phnom Penh
- Wat Bakan, Pursat

=== Japan ===
- Wat Paknam Japan

=== Laos ===
- Wat Si Saket, Vientiane
- Wat Xieng Thong, Luang Prabang
- Wat Mai Suwannaphumaham, Luang Prabang
- Wat Manorom, Luang Prabang

=== Malaysia ===
- Wat Buppharam, Penang
- Wat Chayamangkalaram, Penang
- Wat Chetawan, Selangor
- Wat Phothivihan, Kelantan

Despite having only 3.8 percent Buddhists in Kelantan, the northern Malaysian state of Kelantan has numerous Thai wats.

=== Singapore ===
- Wat Ananda
- Wat Palelai

=== Thailand ===
As of 2016 Thailand had 39,883 wats. Three hundred-ten were royal wats, the remainder were private (public). There were 298,580 Thai Buddhist monks, 264,442 of the Maha Nikaya order and 34,138 of the Dhammayuttika Nikaya order. There were 59,587 Buddhist novice monks.

- Wat Suthat, Bangkok
- Wat Benchamabophit (The Marble Temple)
- Wat Ratchanatdaram
- Wat Phra Kaew
- Wat Arun
- Wat Bowonniwet Vihara
- Wat Pho
- Wat Saket
- Wat Phra That Doi Suthep, Chiang Mai
- Wat Chiang Man, Chiang Mai
- Wat Chedi Luang, Chiang Mai
- Wat Phra Singh, Chiang Mai
- Wat Phra That Lampang Luang, Lampang
- Wat Phumin, Nan
- Phra Pathommachedi, Nakhon Pathom
- Wat Pah Nanachat (International Forest Monastery), Ubon Ratchathani

== Gallery ==
=== Cambodia ===
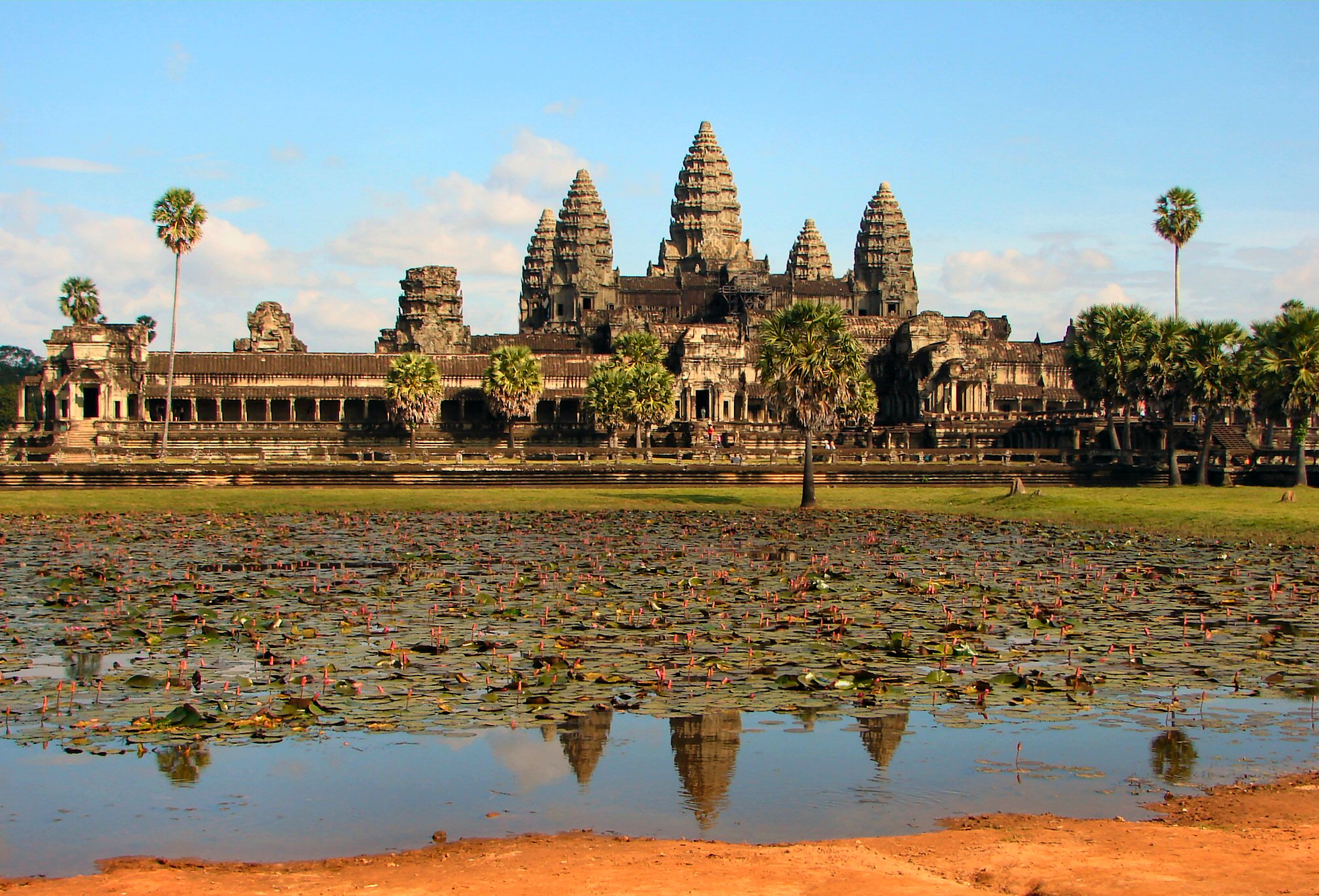
Angkor Wat

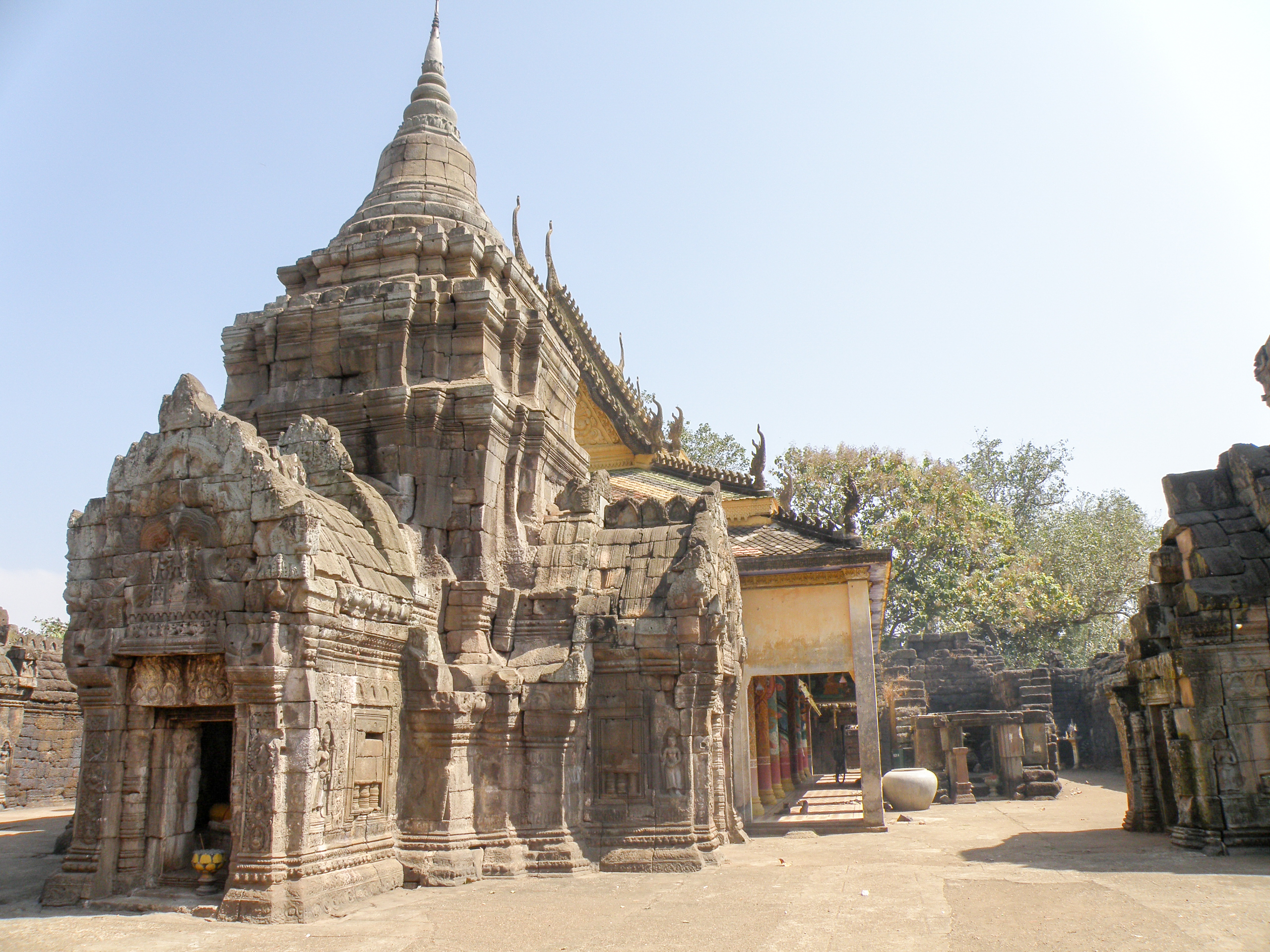
Wat Nokor, Kompong Cham, Cambodia

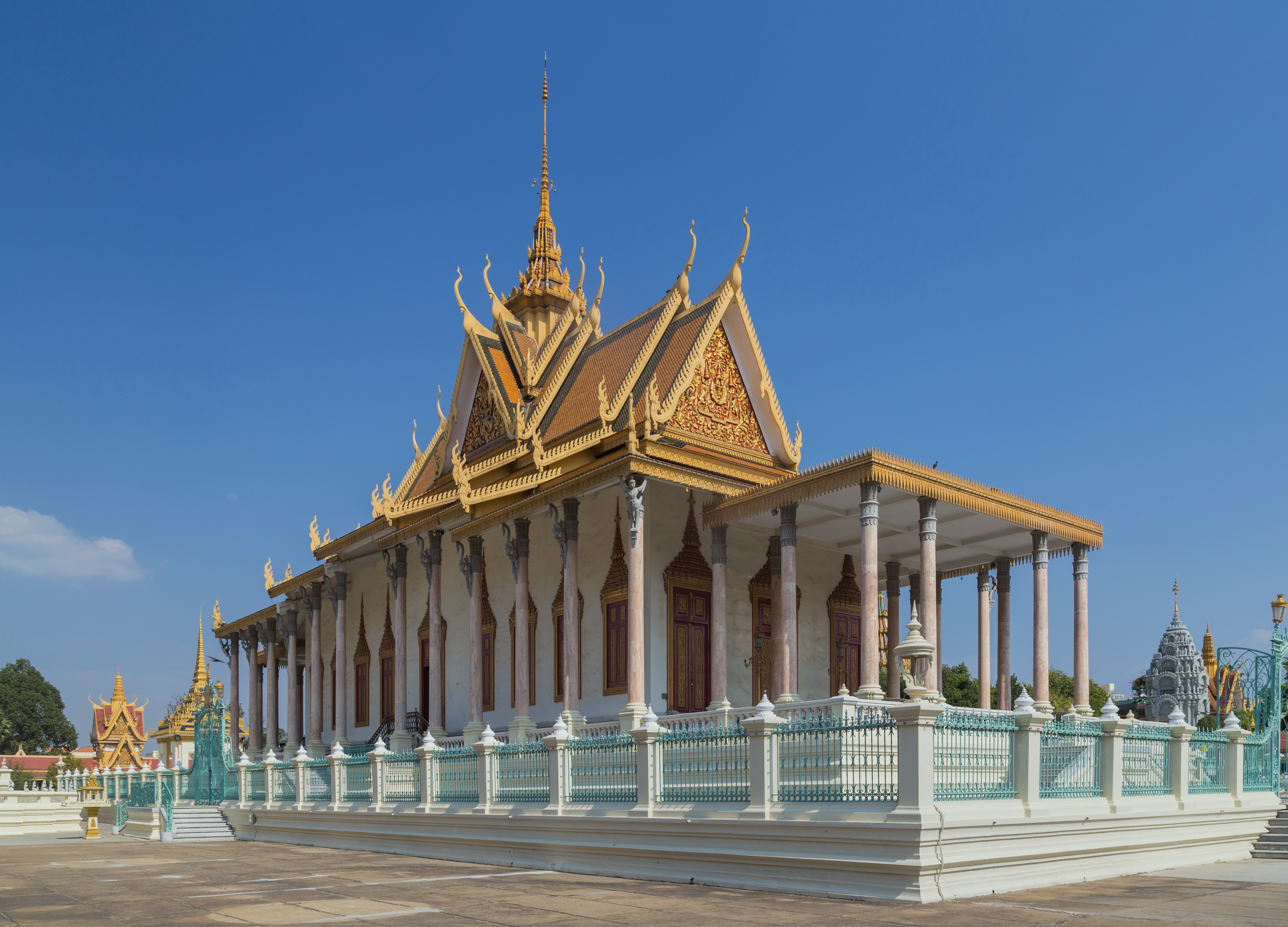
Silver Pagoda

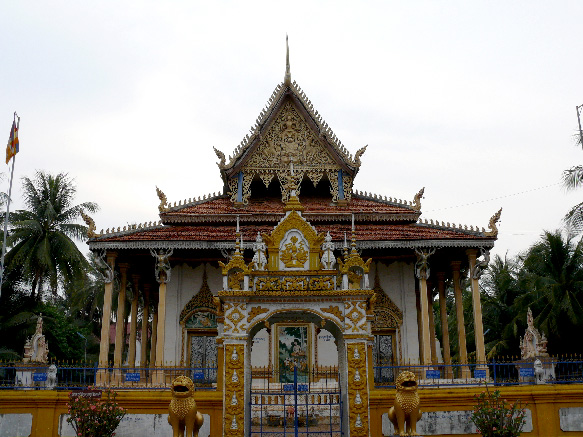
Vihear of Wat Peapet, Battambang, Cambodia

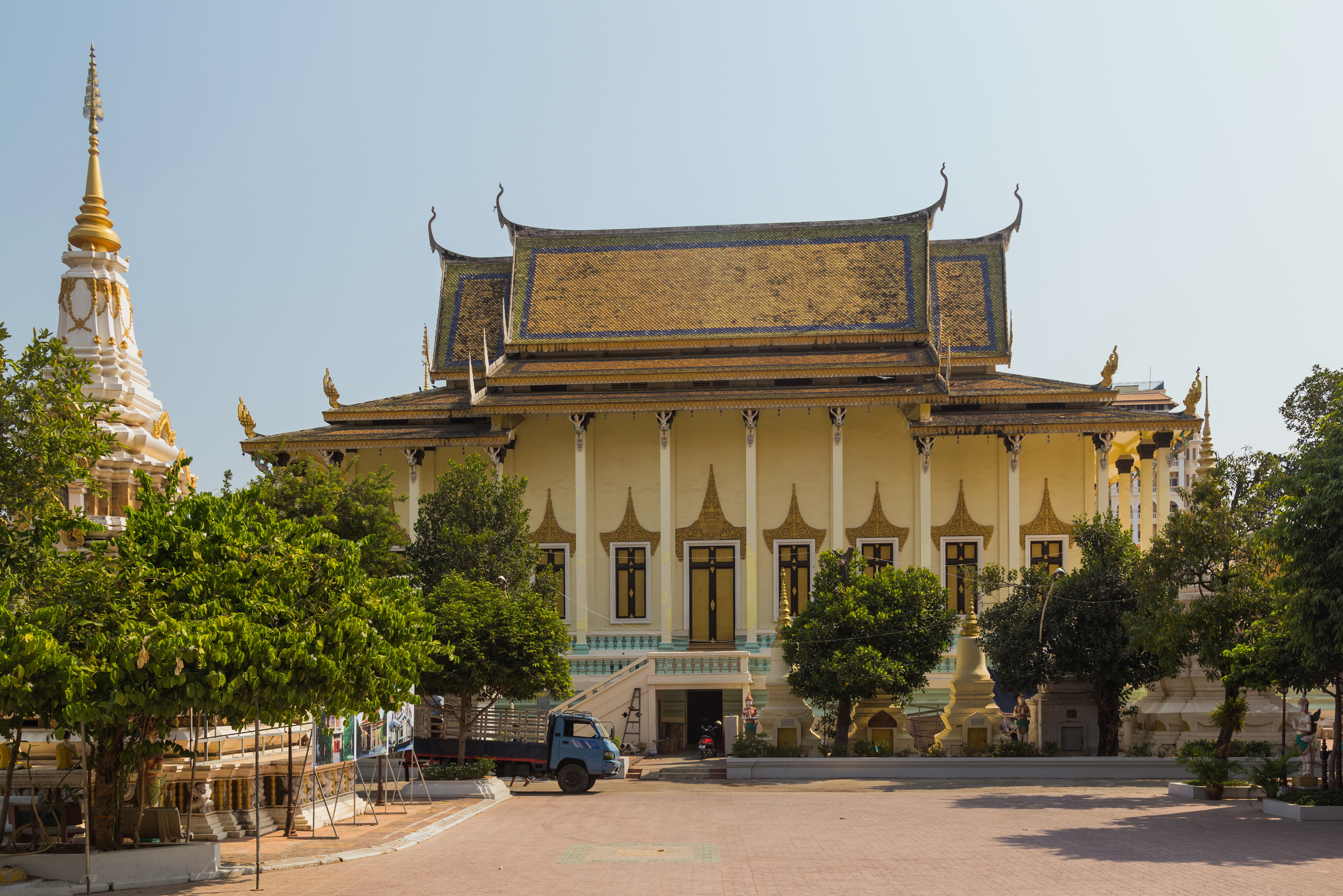
Vihear of Wat Botum Wattey, Phnom Penh, Cambodia

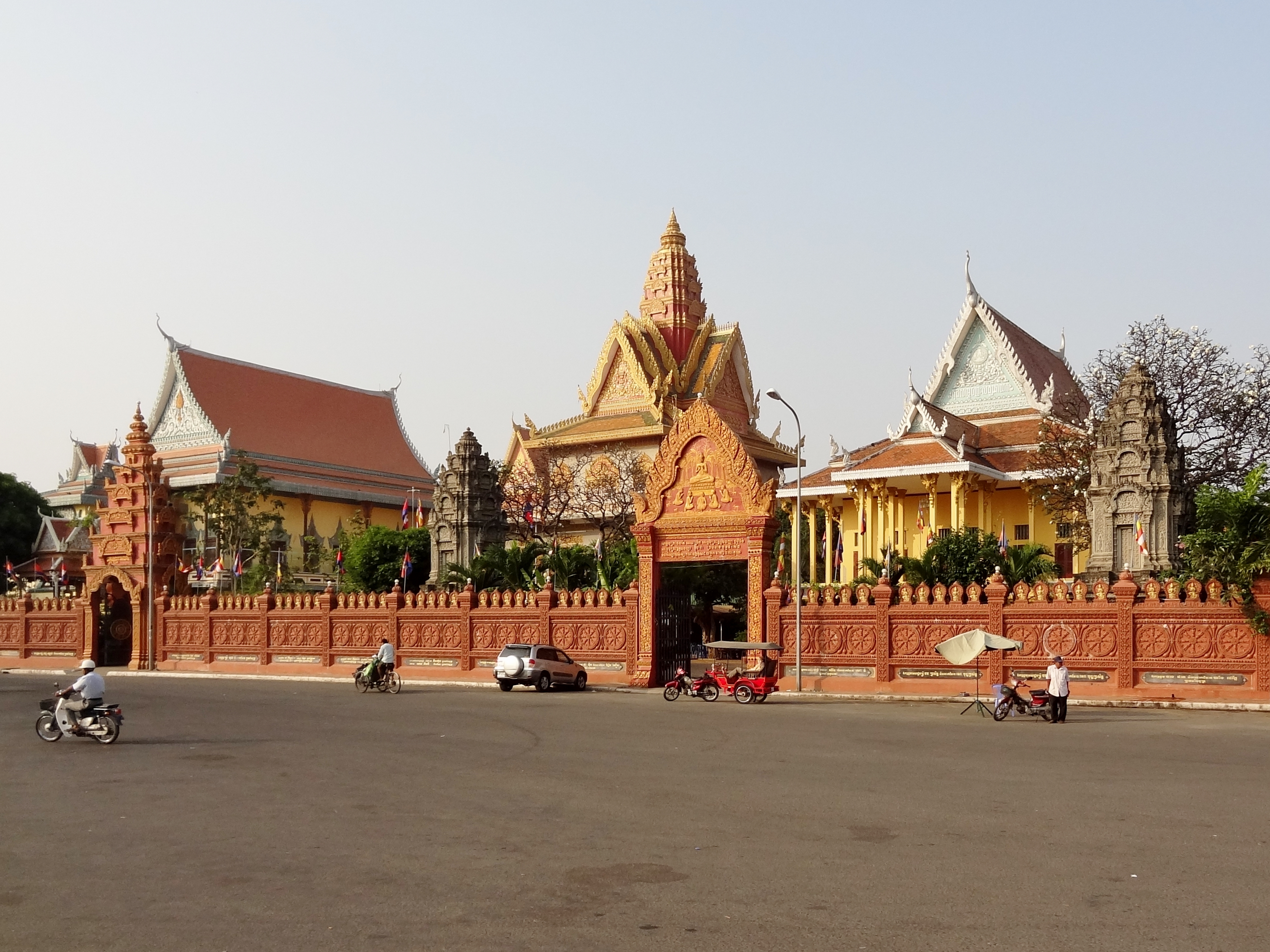
Wat Ounalom

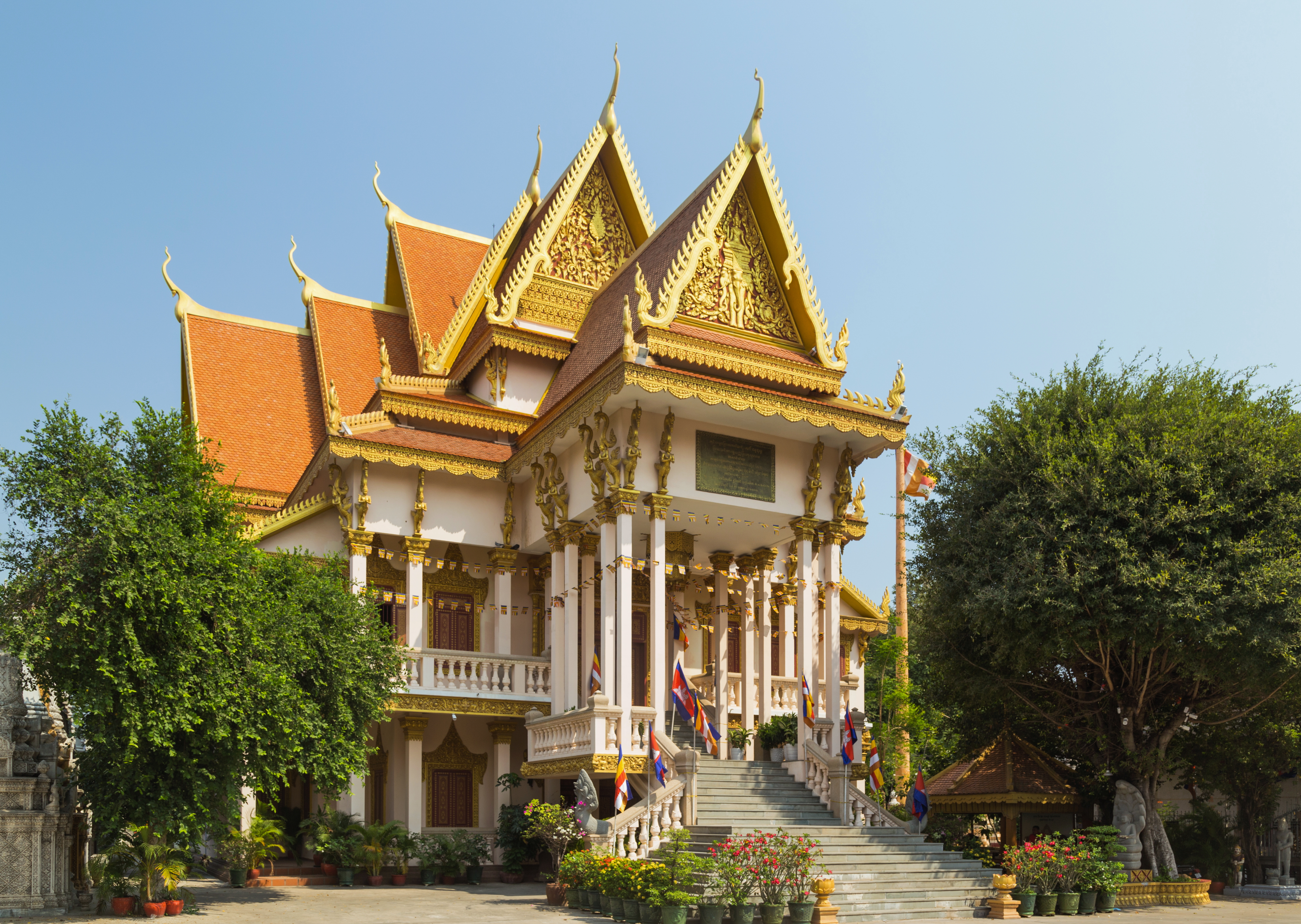
Wat Langka

=== Laos ===
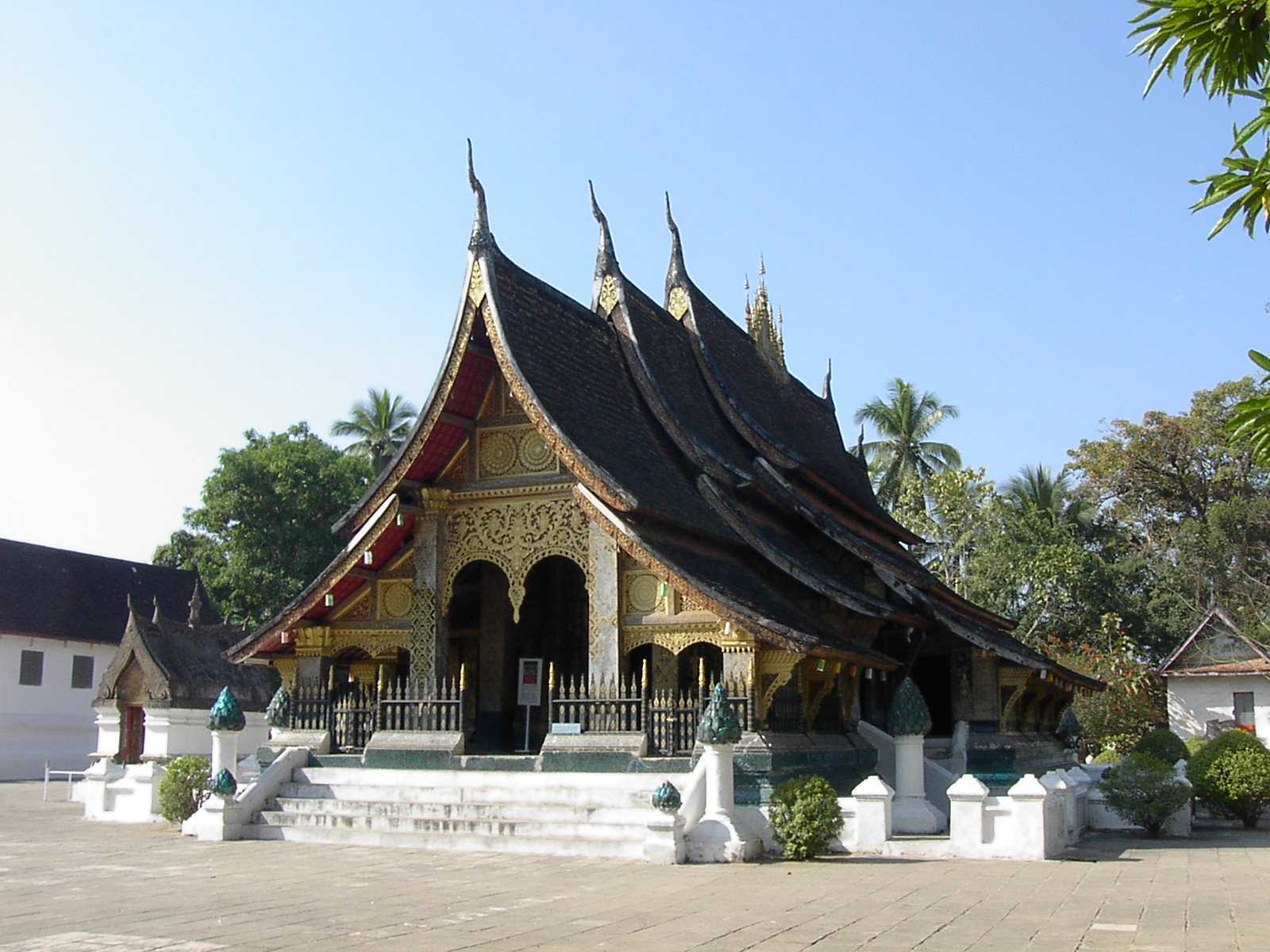
Wat Xieng Thong, Luang Prabang

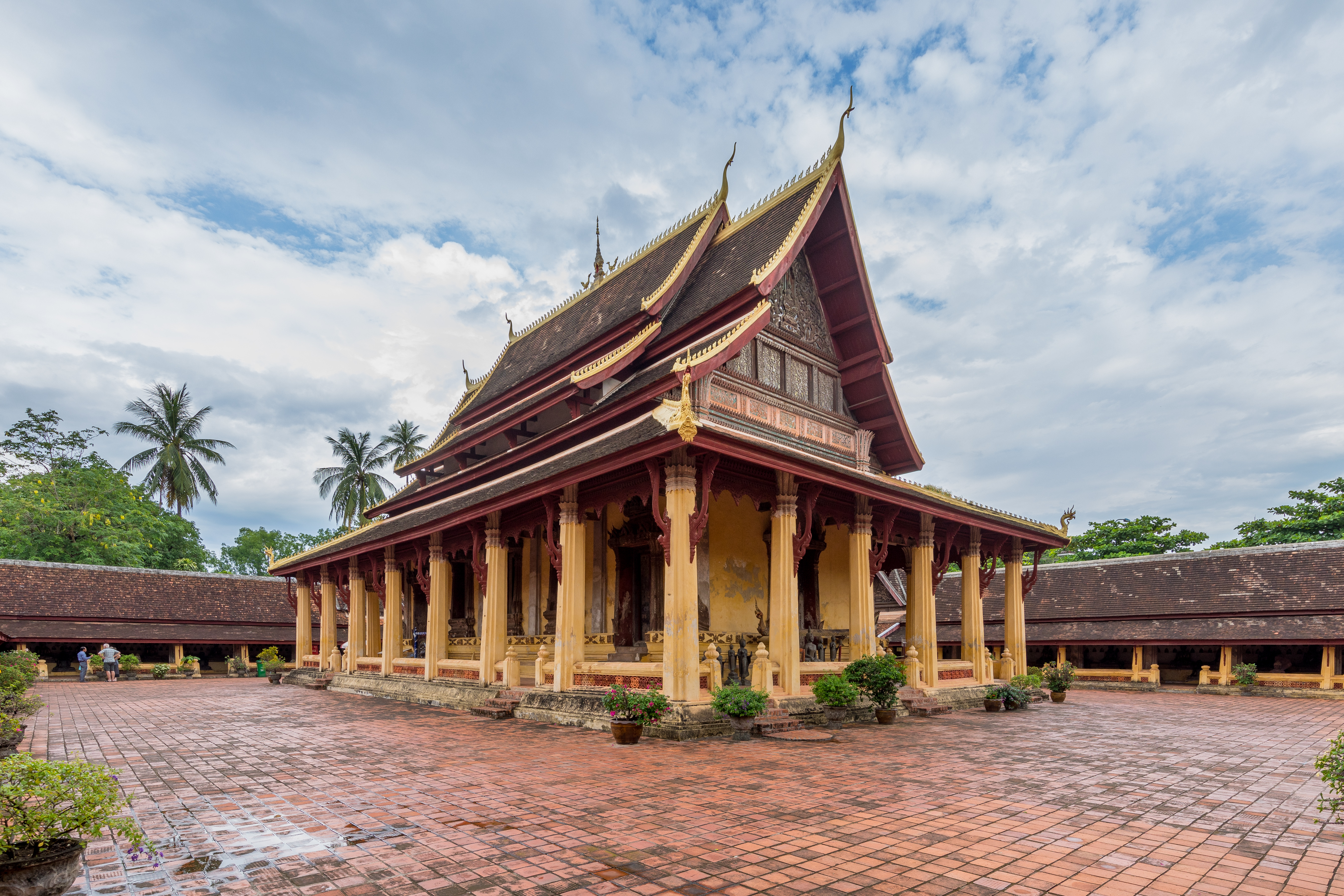
Wat Sisaket

=== Thailand ===
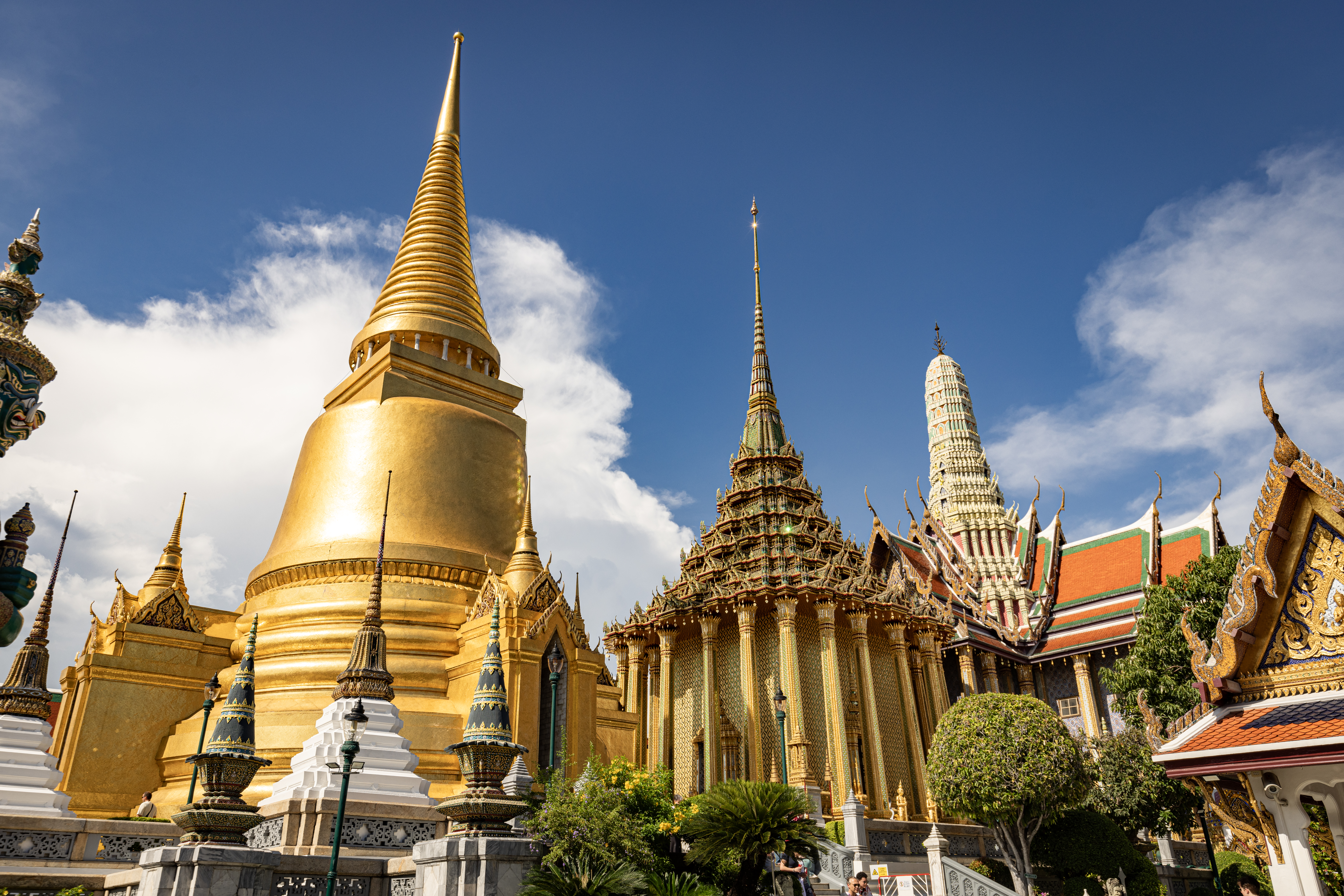
Wat Phra Kaew

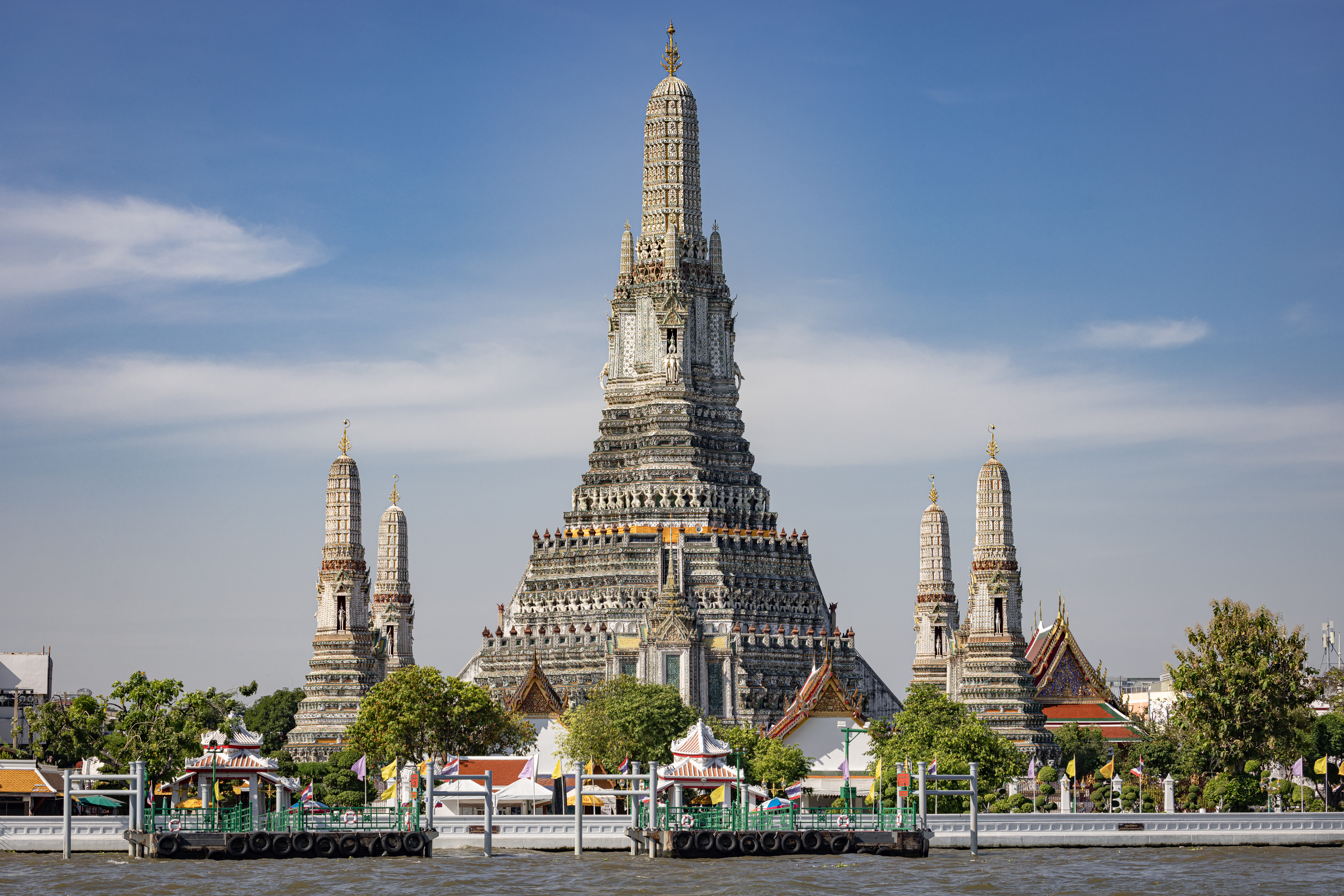
Wat Arun

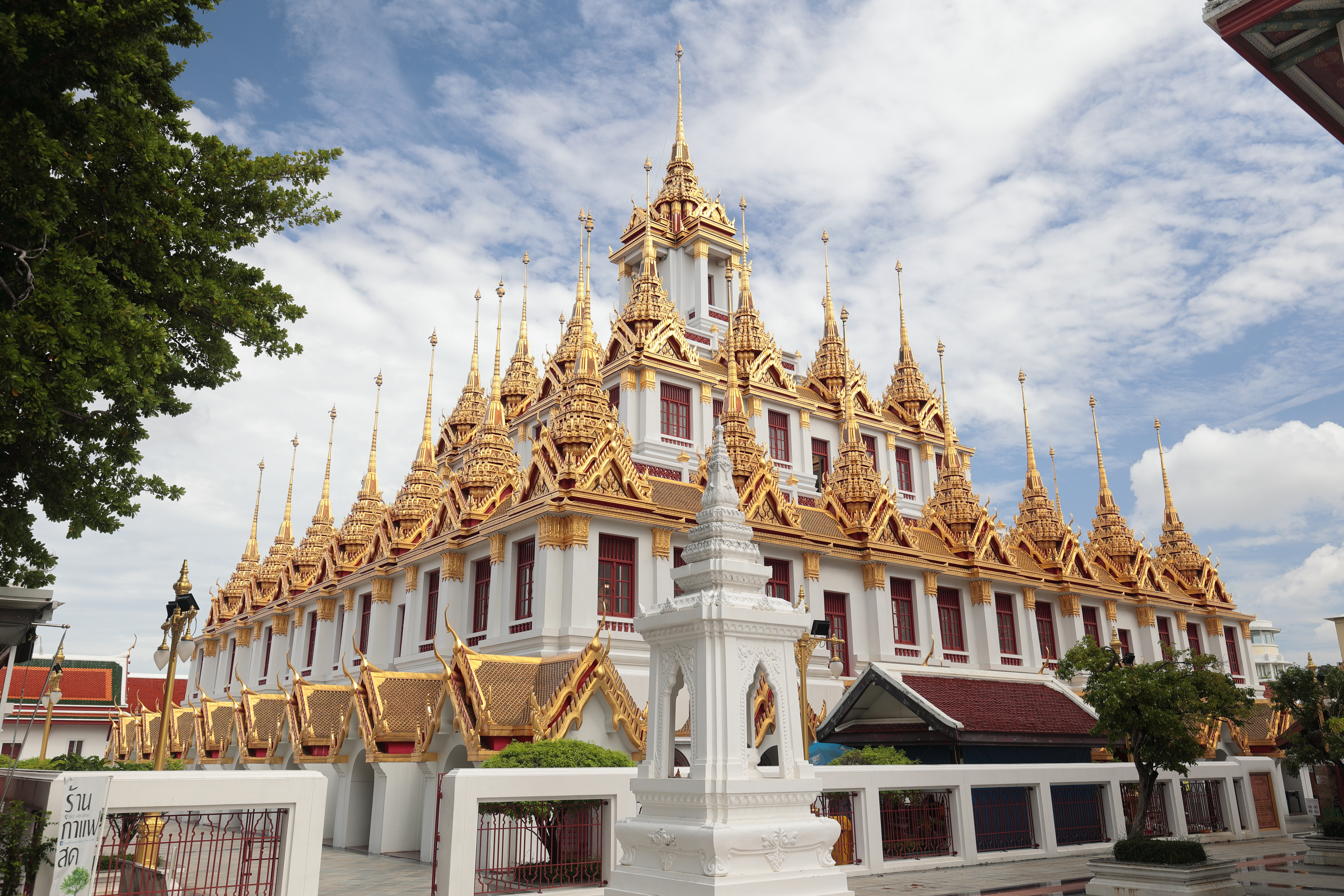
Wat Ratchadatdaram

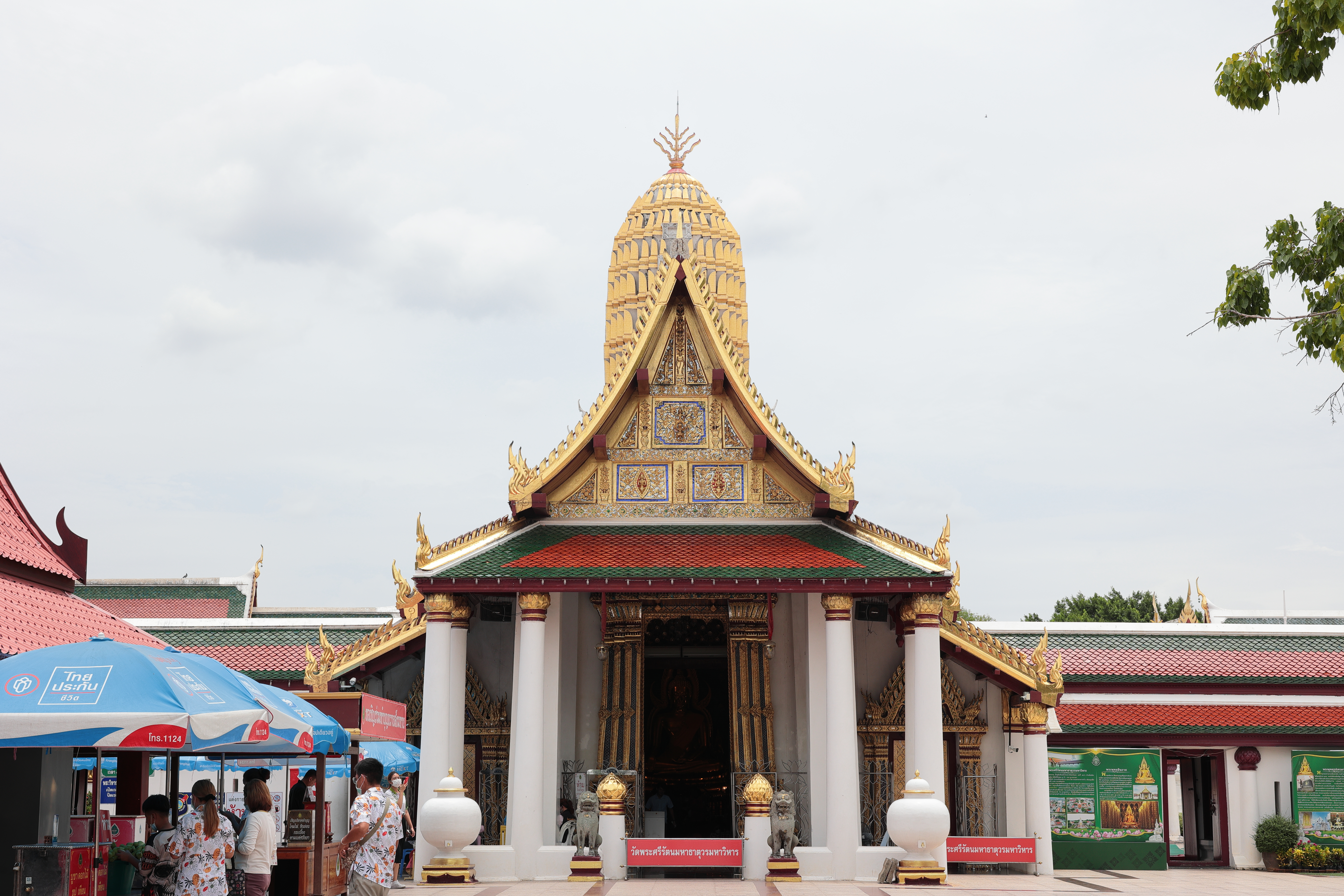
Wat Phra Si Rattana Mahathat, Phitsanulok

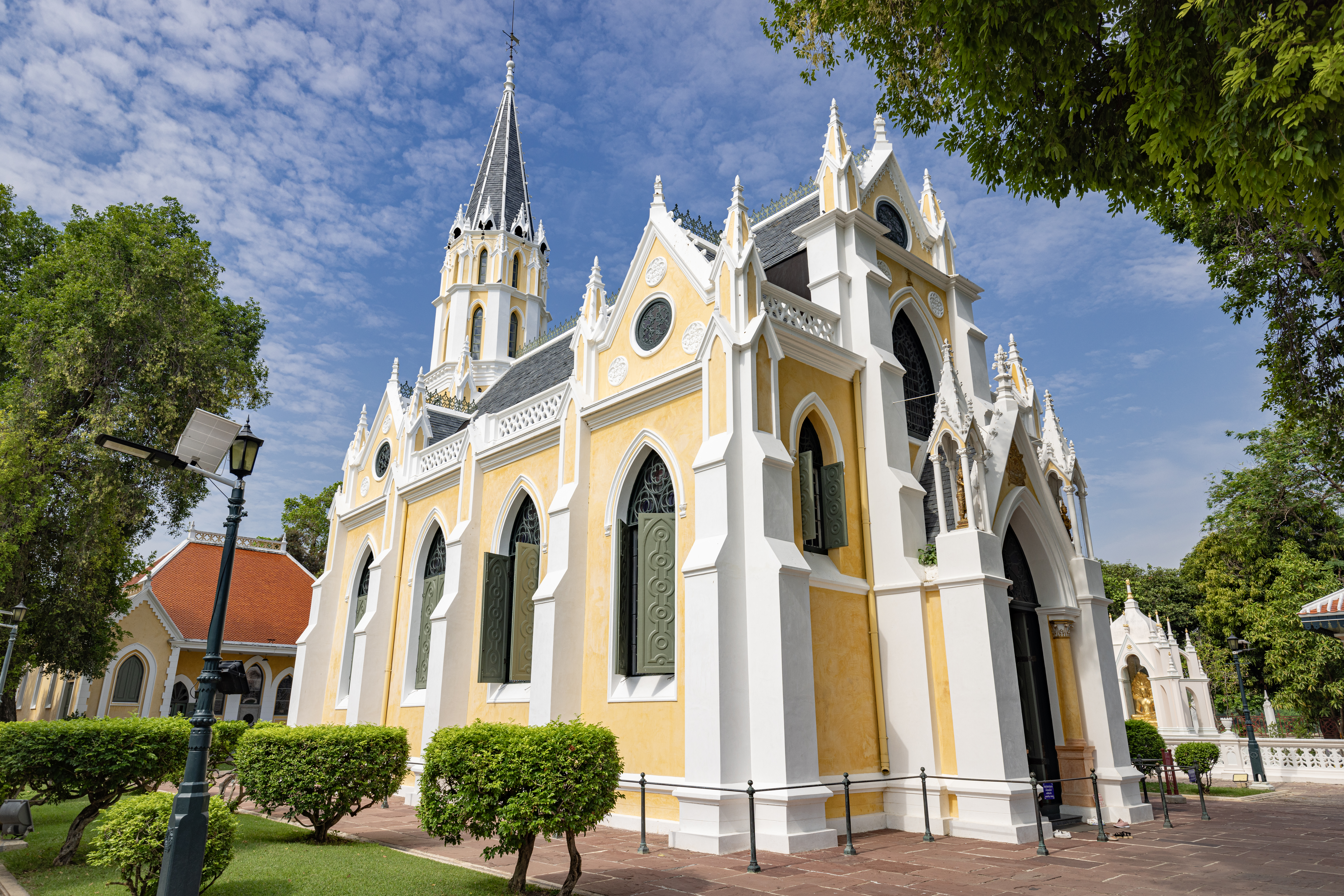
Wat Niwet Thammaprawat, Ayutthaya

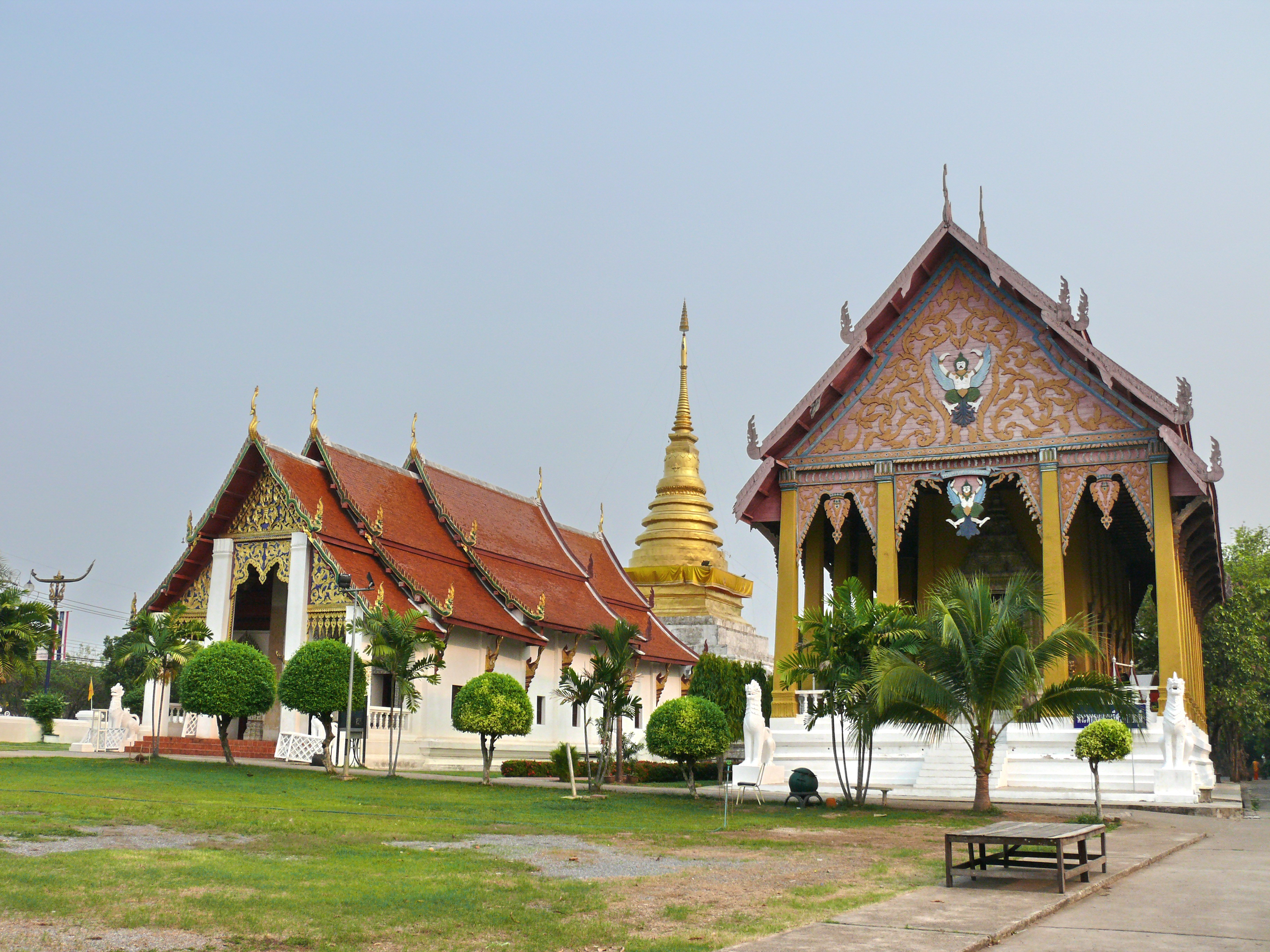
Two wihans and a chedi at Wat Phra That Chang Kham, Nan

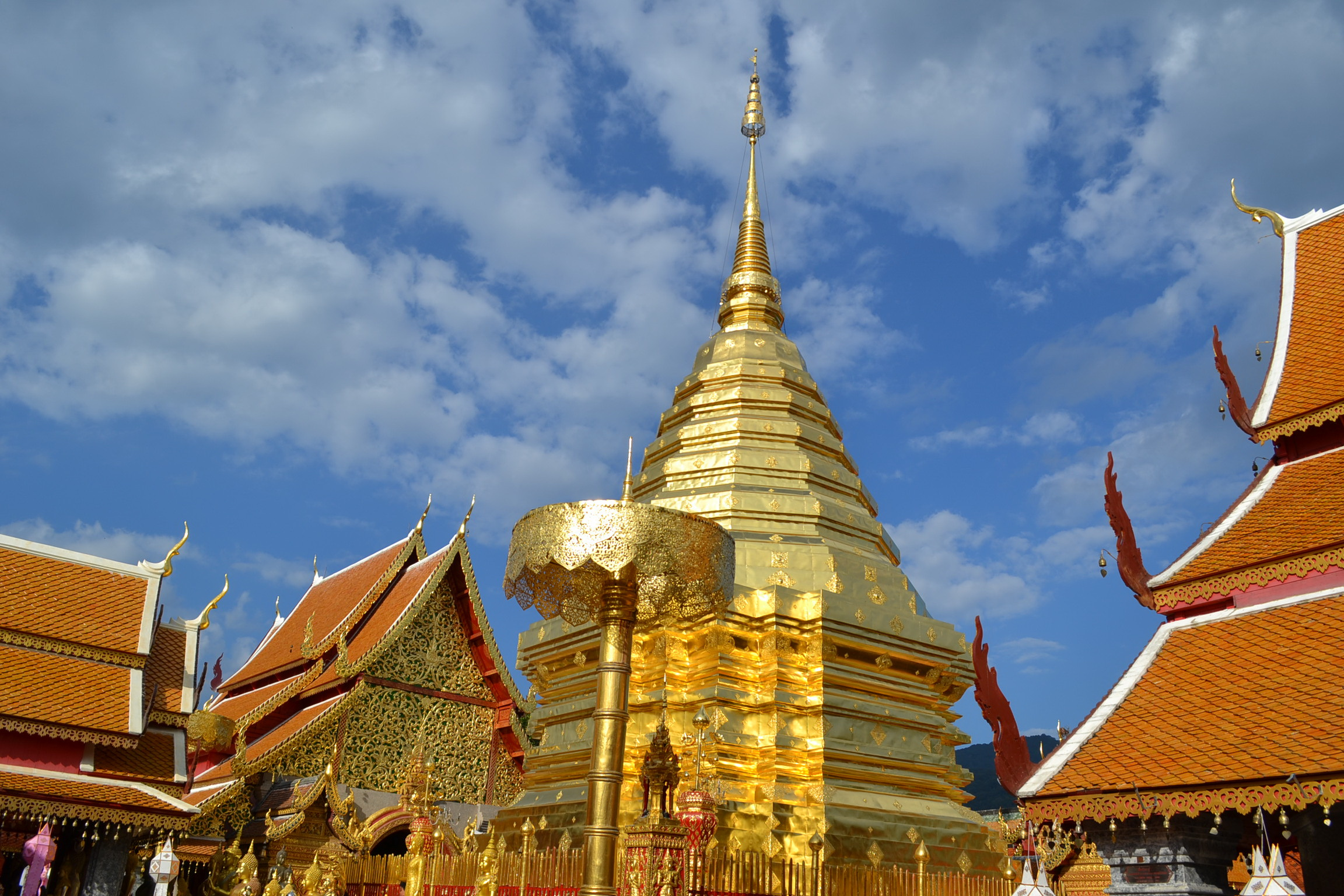
Wat Phra That Doi Suthep, Chiang Mai

=== Other countries ===
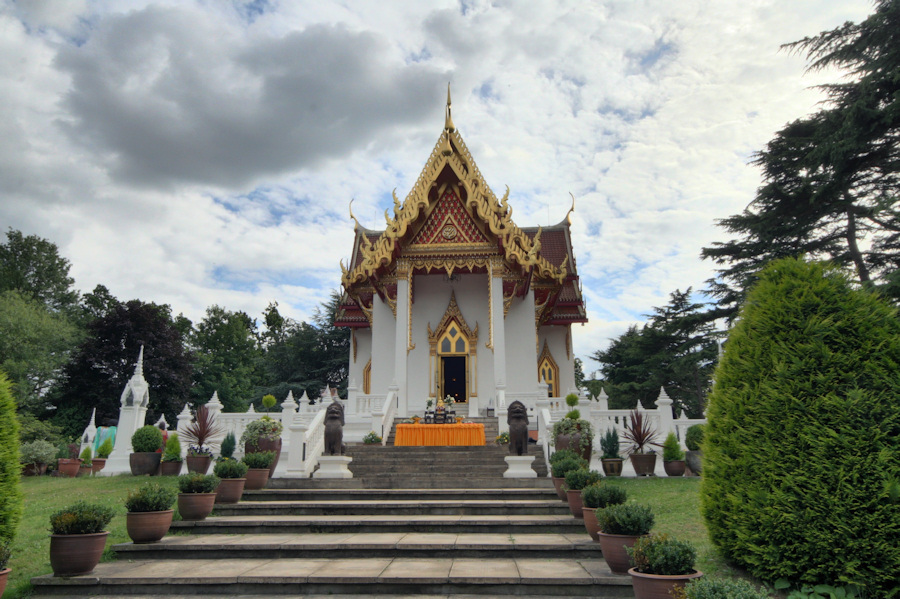
Wat Buddhapadipa in Wimbledon, London, UK

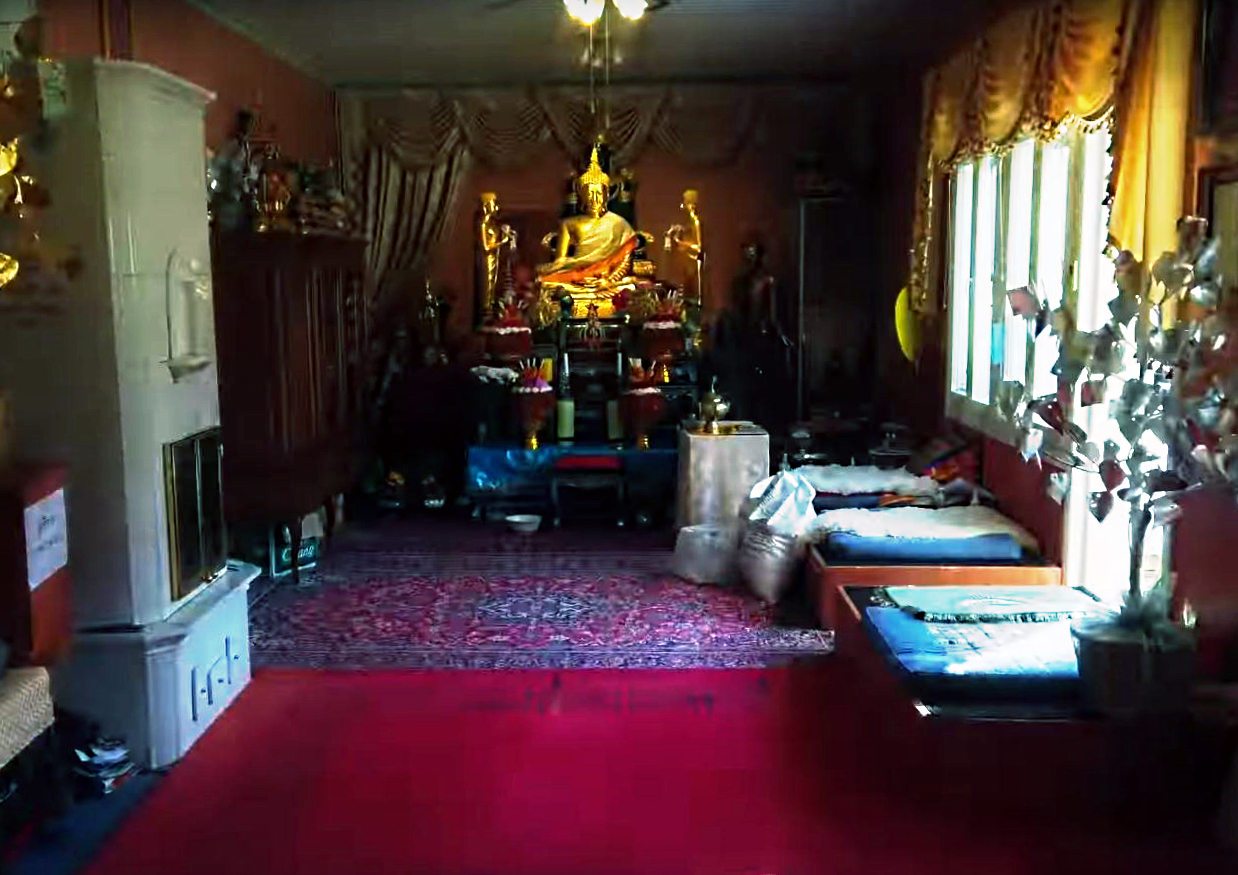
Interior of the Thai Buddhist wat in Nukari, Nurmijärvi, Finland
- Some Tai Khun monasteries in East Shan State, Myanmar are in wat-style but may be called kyaung, while some may be called wat but in kyaung style.

== See also ==
- Three Refuges
- Five Precepts
- Eight Precepts
- Four Noble Truths
- Noble Eightfold Path
- Pāli Canon
- Samatha & Vipassanā
- Cetiya
- Vassa
- Kathina
- Uposatha
- Patimokkha
- Upasampadā
- Bai Sema
- Ordination hall
- Theravāda Buddhism
- Buddhism in Cambodia
- Buddhism in Laos
- Buddhism in Thailand
- Kyaung, Burmese Monasteries
- Pura, Balinese Hindu temples
- Candi, Hindu-Buddha temples of ancient Indonesia, especially Java
