= Wat Phra Sing, Chiang Rai =

Wat Phra Sing
- วัดพระสิงห์
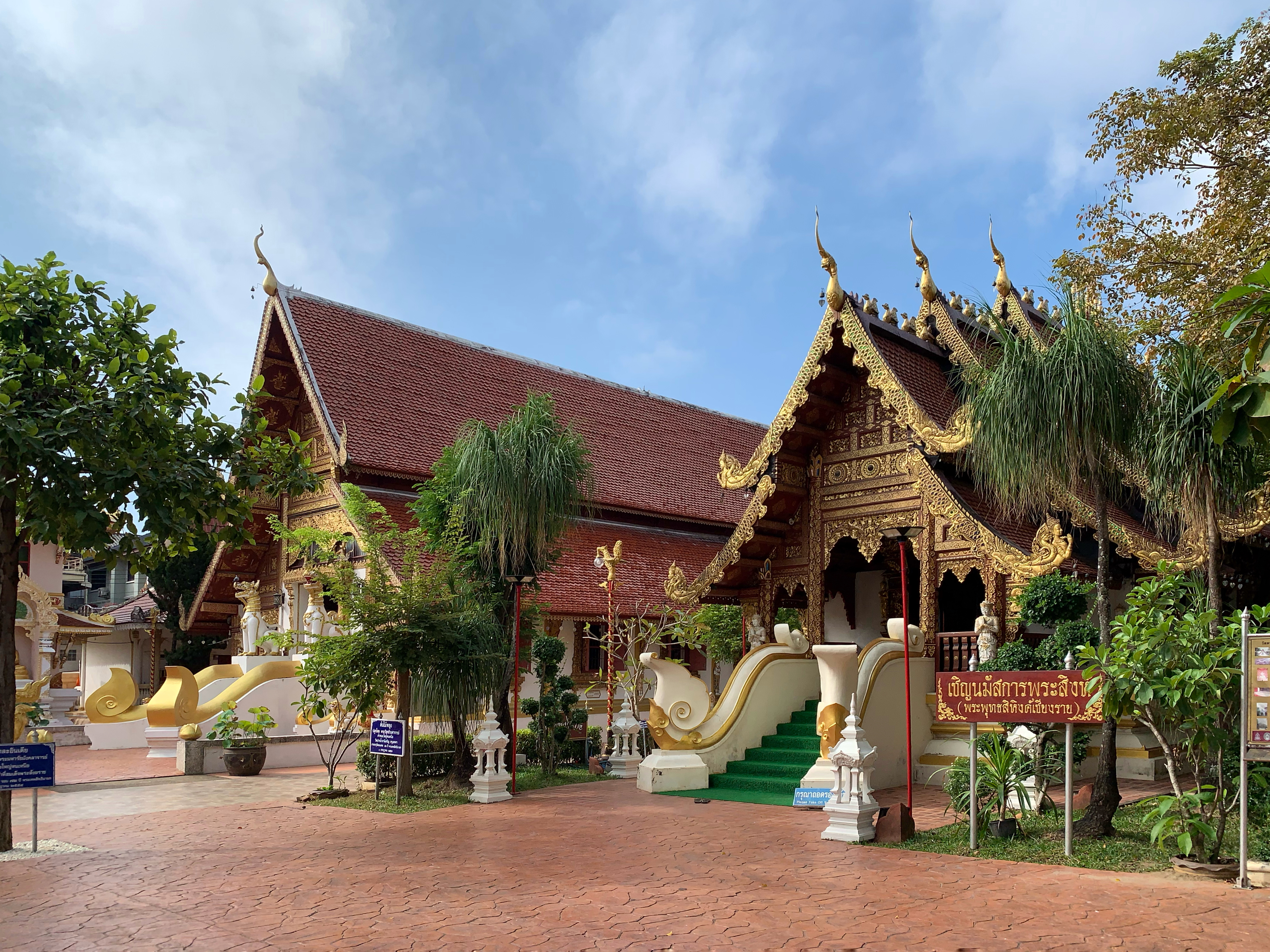
- Ubosot (left) and Wihan Kaew (right) of Wat Phra Sing

Religion
- Affiliation: Theravada

Location
- Location: Mueang district, Chiang Rai Province
- Country: Thailand
- Interactive map of Wat Phra Sing
- Coordinates: 19°54.653′N 99°49.882′E

Architecture
- Style: Lanna
- Creator: unknown

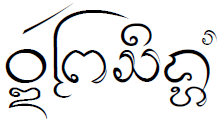
Wat Phra Sing (Thai: วัดพระสิงห์, Northern Thai: ), or sometimes spelled etymologically as Wat Phra Singh, is a Buddhist temple located on Tha Luang Road in Tambon Wiang, Mueang district, Chiang Rai Province in northern Thailand.

== History ==
It was unclear about who first built the temple. According to Jinakālmālīpakarna, the Buddharupa Phra Buddha Sihing (known shortly as Phra Singh) was brought from Kamphaeng Phet to Chiang Mai by the ruler of Chiang Rai and brother of Phaya Keu Na, Thao Maha Brahma. Phaya Keu Na later ordered the sanctum where Phra Singh was enshrined to be rebuilt. Phra Singh, hence, was transported to be enshrined at the royal vihara in Chiang Rai. The vihara was later known by its Buddharupa and thus called "Wat Phra Singh" (wat [of] Phra Singh). Moreover, Thao Maha Brahma ordered a replica of Phra Singh to be created at Koh Don Thaen (เกาะดอนแท่น) in Chiang Saen. It was later enshrined in Wat Phra Singh of Chiang Rai ever since. After the death of Phaya Keu Na, his son Phaya Sean Mueang Ma reigned the kingdom. Thao Maha Brahma, who could not stand Phaya Saen Mueang Ma taking the throne, battled over Chiang Mai but failed. After he was captured by Phaya Saen Mueang Ma, Phra Singh was ordered to be returned to Chiang Mai where it has been located in the temple that shares the name in Chiang Mai since.

== Artefacts and Buildings ==
=== Ubosot ===
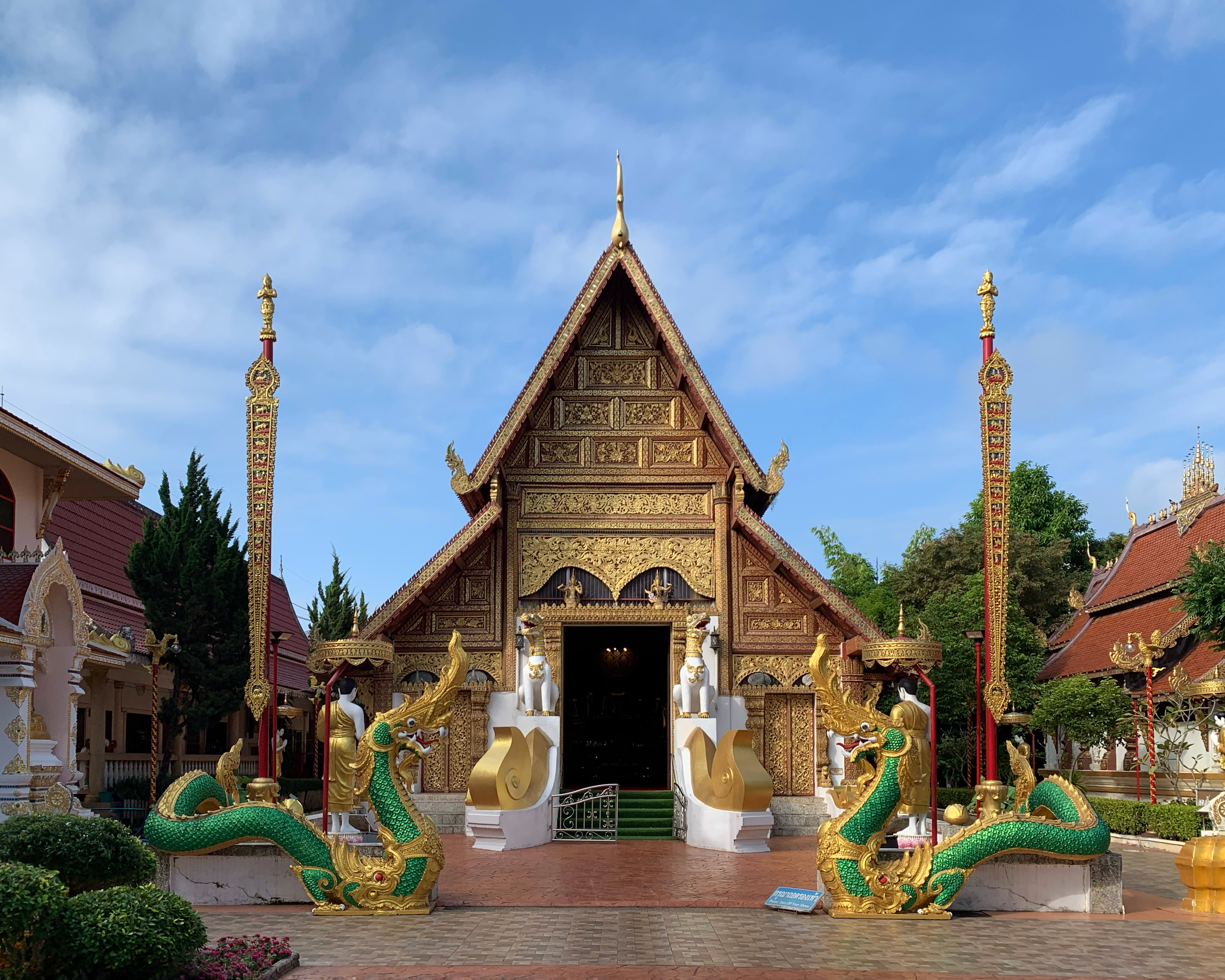
The ubosot

The ubosot was built in 1890. It was thought to be built on the base of a former Lanna-era vihara. It shares architectural styles with the ubosots of Wat Ngam Mueang and Wat Phra Kaew, Chiang Rai. It was possible that the same architect team designed all the three temples' ubosots.

Phra Singh Luang (พระสิงห์หลวง) is the main Buddharupa in the ubosot, posing in Maravijaya attitude. It is 2.04 metres wide and 2.84 metres high. At the base is an inscription in Tai Tham script saying "kusalā dhammā akusalā dhammā abayakatā dhammā" which means "Dharma can be divided into three conditions; some are "kushala" (good-doing), some are "akushala" (bad-doing), and some are neither."

The door panels were decorated by the Chiang Rai-based artist Thawan Duchanee. The four animals symbolise the four elements that exist in human body.

=== Wihan Kaew ===
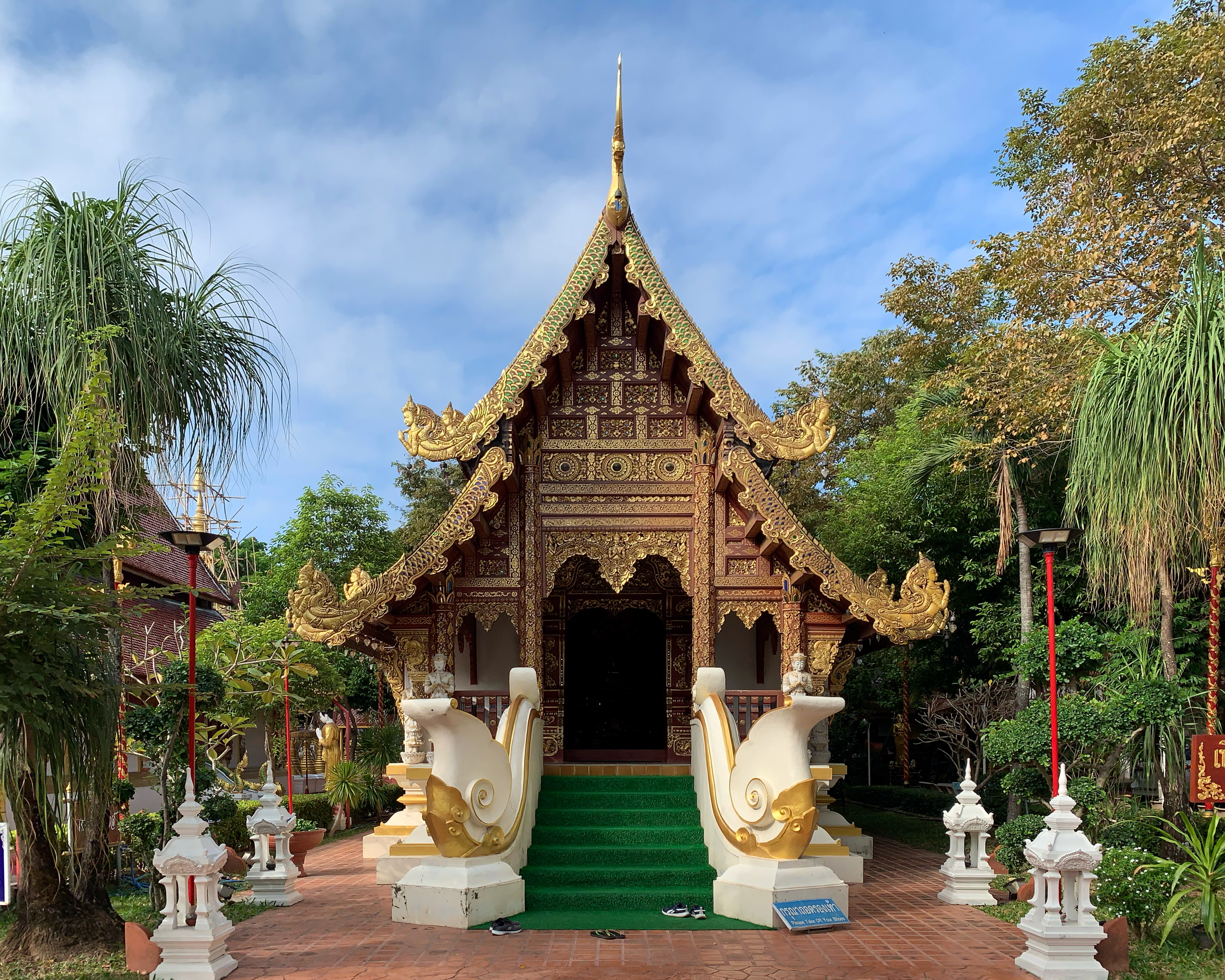
Wihan Kaew

Wihan Kaew (วิหารแก้ว; the glass vihara) was built in place of the former Hall of Phra Kaew Noi which was built in 1891 and demolished in 2008. The interior is decorated with murals depicting the legend of Phra Singh.

Inside the Wihan Kaew enshrined the Buddharupa Phra Singh Noi ("the small[er] Phra Singh") which is 37 centimetre-wide and 66-centimetre high. It was relocated from Chiang Mai in 1843 by Khru Ba Pawon Panya, along with the citizens to rebuild Chiang Rai.
