= Wat Chiang Yuen =

- วัดเชียงยืน
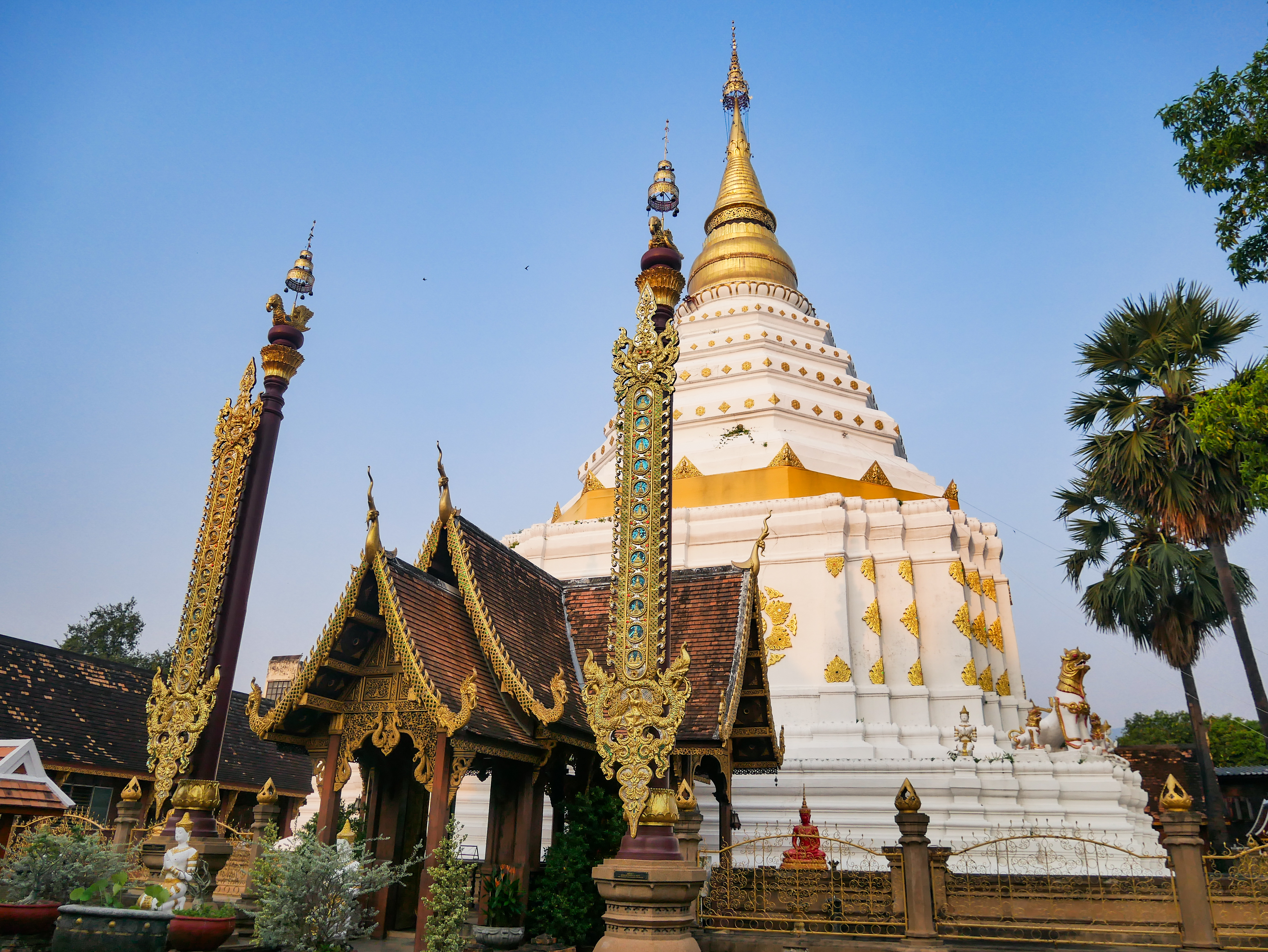
- Phra Borommathat Chiang Yuen, the temple's stupa

- Location within Thailand

Religion
- Affiliation: Buddhism
- Sect: Theravada Buddhism
- District: Si Phum subdistrict, Mueang Chiang Mai district
- Province: Chiang Mai Province

Location
- Municipality: Chiang Mai
- Country: Thailand
- Coordinates: 18.796367°N 98.988414°E

Wat Chiang Yuen (Thai: วัดเชียงยืน, also romanised as Wat Chiang Yeun) is a Buddhist temple in Chiang Mai, Thailand, located just north of the walled city, outside the Chang Phueak Gate. The temple name Chiang Yuen consists of two words: chiang (เชียง; city) and yuen (ยืน; to stand), together meaning the temple of "the city that stands (for a long time)". Hence the importance of the temple as a temple past Lan Na kings visited before coronation. The belief translates to the locals as well, who would pay respect at the temple at the beginning of a new position or a new business. The temple is considered significant historically with its importance to the rulers, as well as serving as the seat of the supreme patriarch in the past, starting from its inaugurator Phra Abhaya Sārda (Unruean Sophano).

The temple was built to the north of the walled city, a direction correlated to "power" (det mueang, เดชเมือง; the city's power/authority) according to the horoscopic system of Thaksa. Coronation rituals in the Lan Na Kingdom consisted of the king entering Chiang Mai's walled city at the Chang Phueak Gate; which sits in the north. It is thus believed to bless the ruler with similarly power and authority due to its cardinal direction's association with power. A similar ritual also existed after a warfare. The ruler would visit Wat Chiang Yuen to first remove his warrior attire and worship the principal Buddha statue of the temple; Phra Sapphanyu Chao Det Mueang, located in the wihan, before entering back into the walled city at Chang Phueak Gate.

== History ==
The temple is believed to have been built by King Mangrai, the first king of Lan Na, though the exact history of the temple's construction remains unknown. It was considered an important religious site for rulers of Lan Na, with historical records noting kings and warriors alike came to pay homage to the principal Buddha statue of the temple; Phra Sapphanyu Chao (พระสัพพัญญูเจ้า; also romanised as Phra Suppunyu Chao). Past kings would visit and pay respect at the temple before coronation with the belief that, as the temple's name suggests, the temple will protect the kingdom to remain "standing". The temple together with Wat Chiang Man formed a temple couple with auspicious names for the rulers; with the latter meaning the temple of "the city that remains strong" (from man; (มั่น, to remain strong). The two temples are thus believed to have been built together, possibly so by Mangrai himself.

The temple was abandoned when Chiang Mai came under the Burmese rule. It was later reconstructed in 1794 by King Kawila after he successfully reclaimed the city back from the Burmese.

The Yonok Chronicles mentioned the temple under the name Wat Thikha Chiwa Watsaram (from Pali: Ḍīgha Jīva Vassārām), meaning the "temple of longevity". Another historical name as mentioned in Jinakalamalipakarna was Wat Thikhaya Wisaram (from Pali: Ḍīghaya Visārām).

== Architecture ==
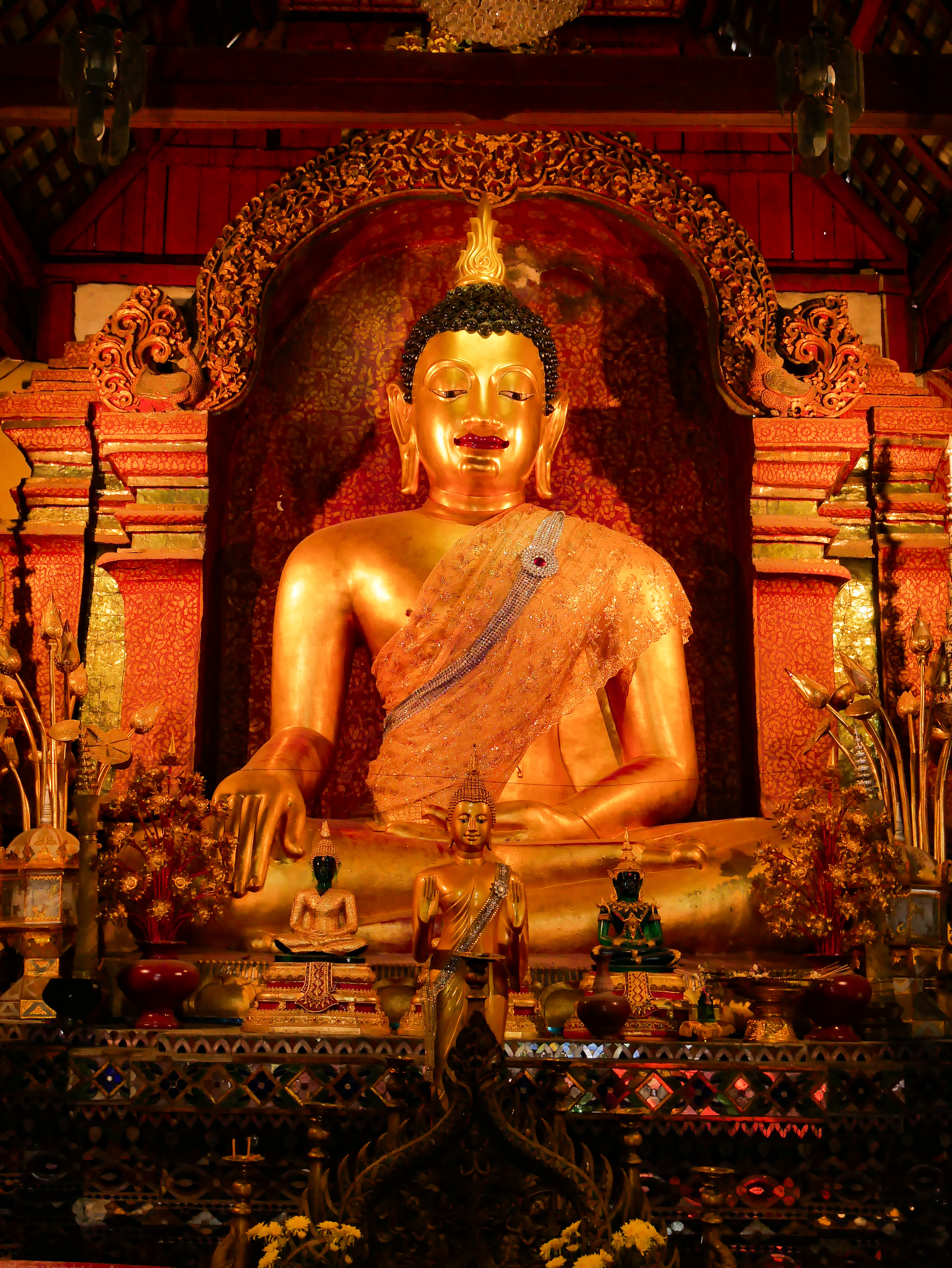
Phra Sapphanyu Chao inside the wihan

Inside the wihan (hall) of the temple sits the principal Buddha statue, Phra Sapphanyu Chao (พระสัพพัญญูเจ้า; also romanised as Phra Suppunyu Chao) or Phra Sapphanyu Chao Det Mueang (พระสัพพัญญูเจ้าเดชเมือง; with the ending referencing to the temple's "power" position in Lan Na horoscope). It is an important Buddha image with historical significance. Past Lan Na kings visited the temple to pay respect to the statue before coronation, as well as both before and after a warfare.

Phra Borommathat Chiang Yuen (พระบรมธาตุเชียงยืน) or Phra Maha That Chedi (พระมหาธาตุเจดีย์) is the temple's stupa. Located behind the wihan, it has a whitewashed square base guarded by Burmese chinthe on each corner, an octagonal middle section dotted with porcelain flowers, and a five-tiered hti crowning the stupa. In 1518, King Mueang Kaeo and his mother Siri Yotsawadi Thewi enshrined Buddhist relics inside it. In front of the stupa are two tung kradang (ตุงกระด้าง; lit. 'hard flag'), given as a votive offering to the relics. In 2009, as a part of the occasion of King Bhumibol's 6th birthday cycle (in 1999), the stupa underwent a major restoration. During which, the top hti was removed for restoration, uncovering seven relics enshrined inside the lotus finial. The finding was in line with the story described in the Jinakalamalipakarana.

Located in what is present-day the temple's school (Wat Chiang Yeun School) is the octagonal ubosot (ordination hall), a unique structure with a mix of Lan Na and Burmese styles. It was built by Luang Yonakan Phichit (1845-1927), a wood handler and sculptor who was known for his contributions in building and restoring various temples in Northern Thailand.

Both the stupa and the octagonal ubosot are registered Thai historical site under the Fine Arts Department.

== Gallery ==
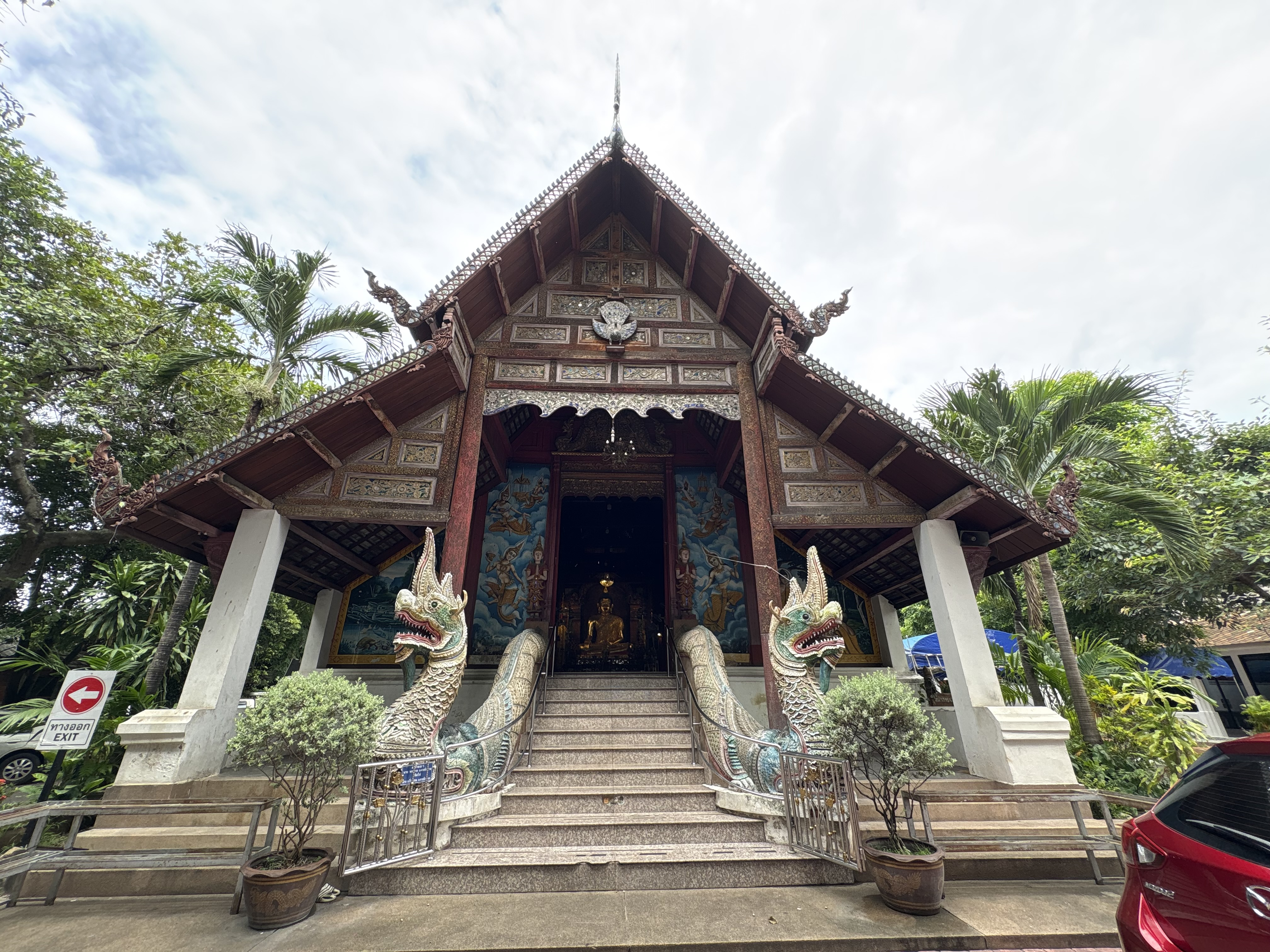
Front view of the wihan

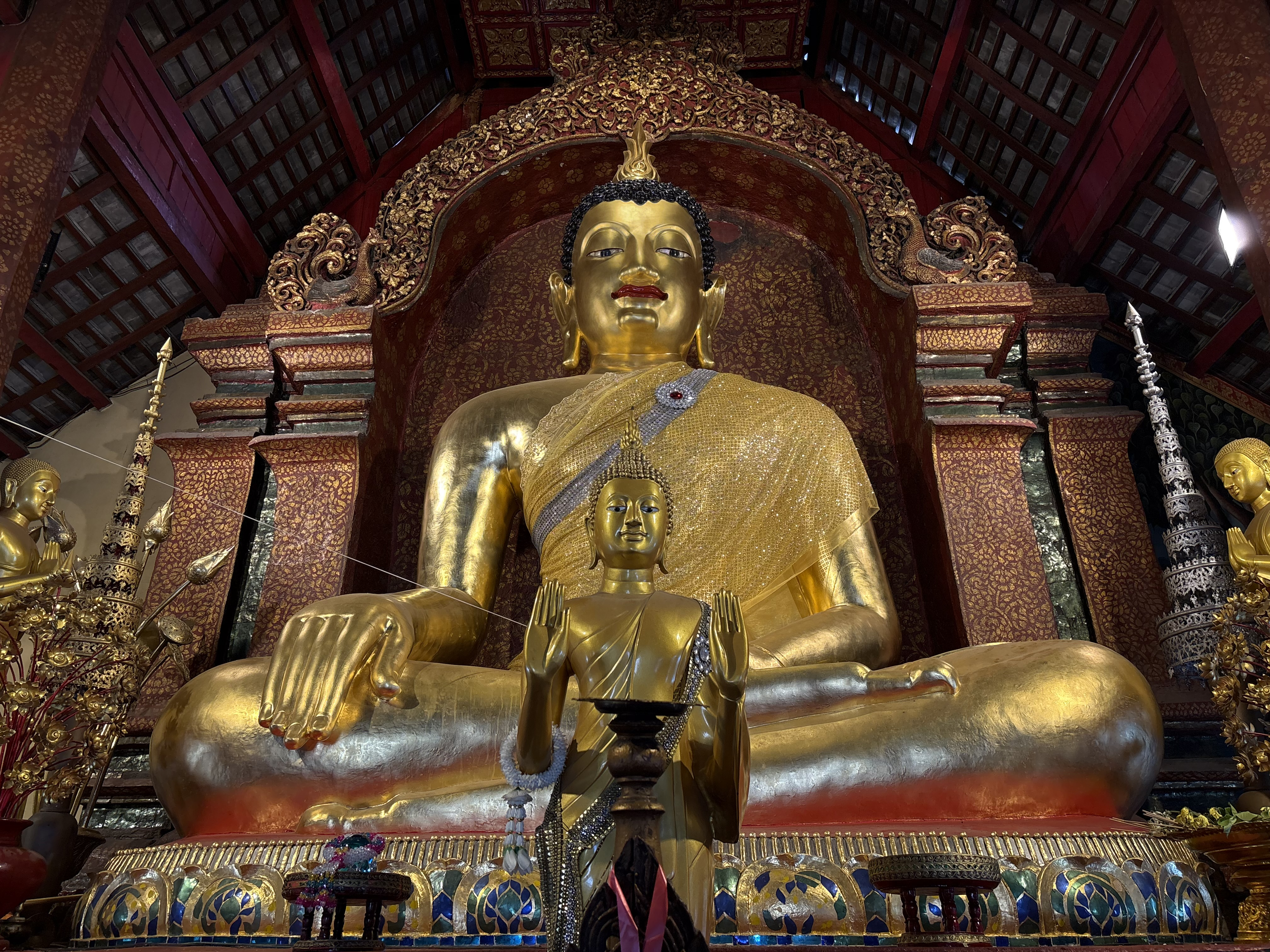
Phra Sapphanyu Chao Det Mueang, the principal image of the temple, located inside the wihan

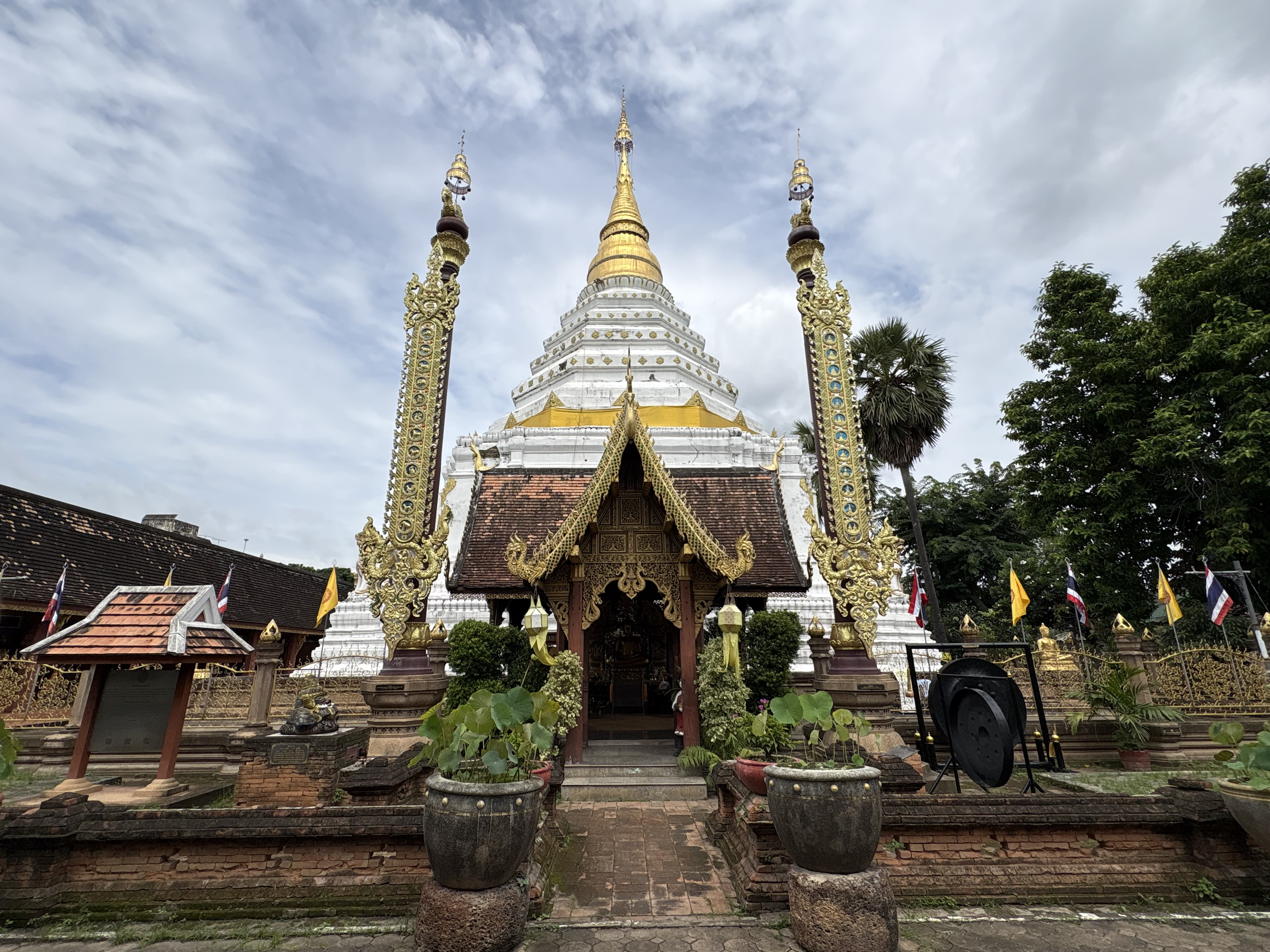
Front view of the stupa. Note the pair of tung kradang flanking the sala

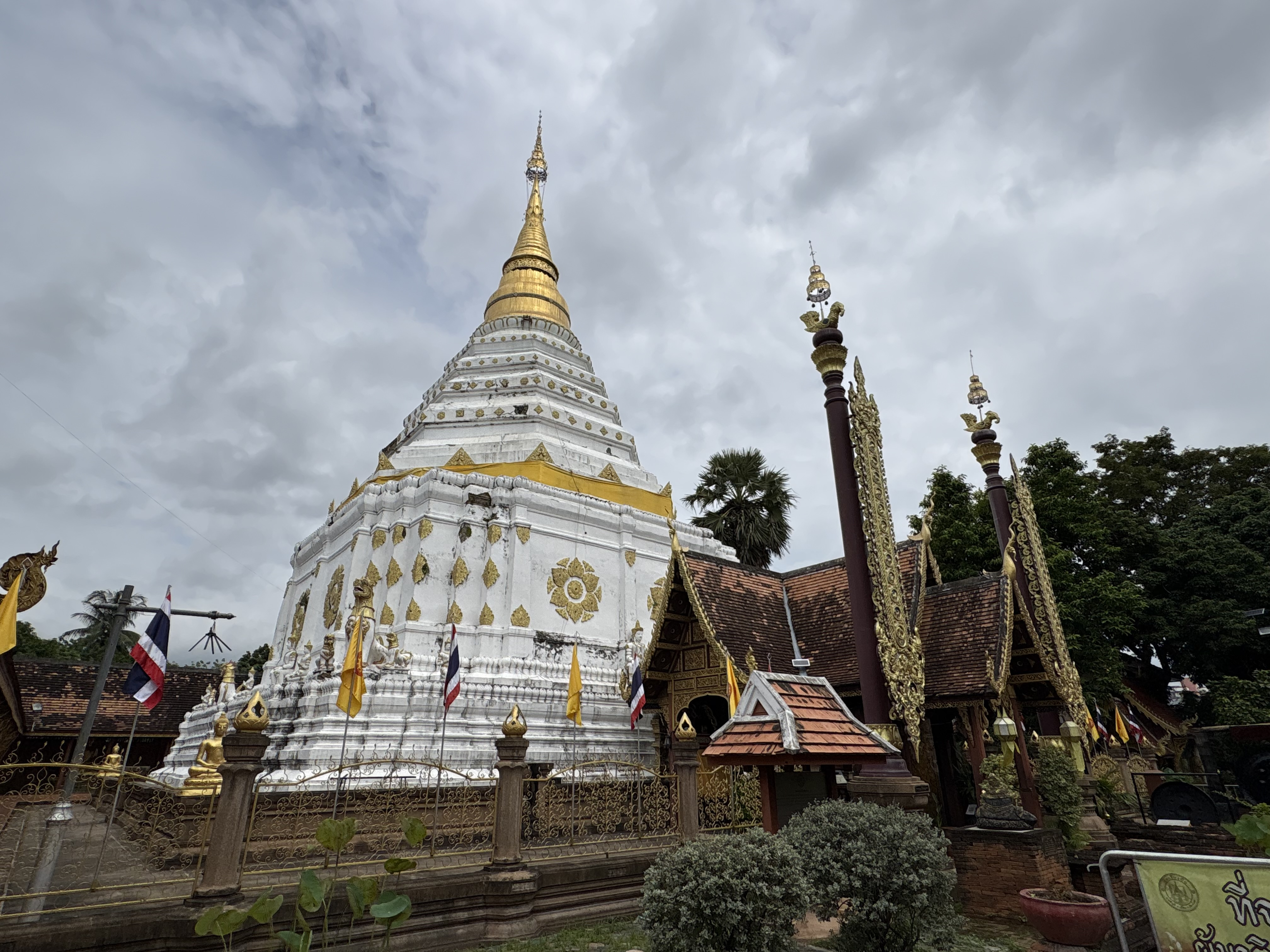
Phra Borommathat Chiang Yuen, the stupa

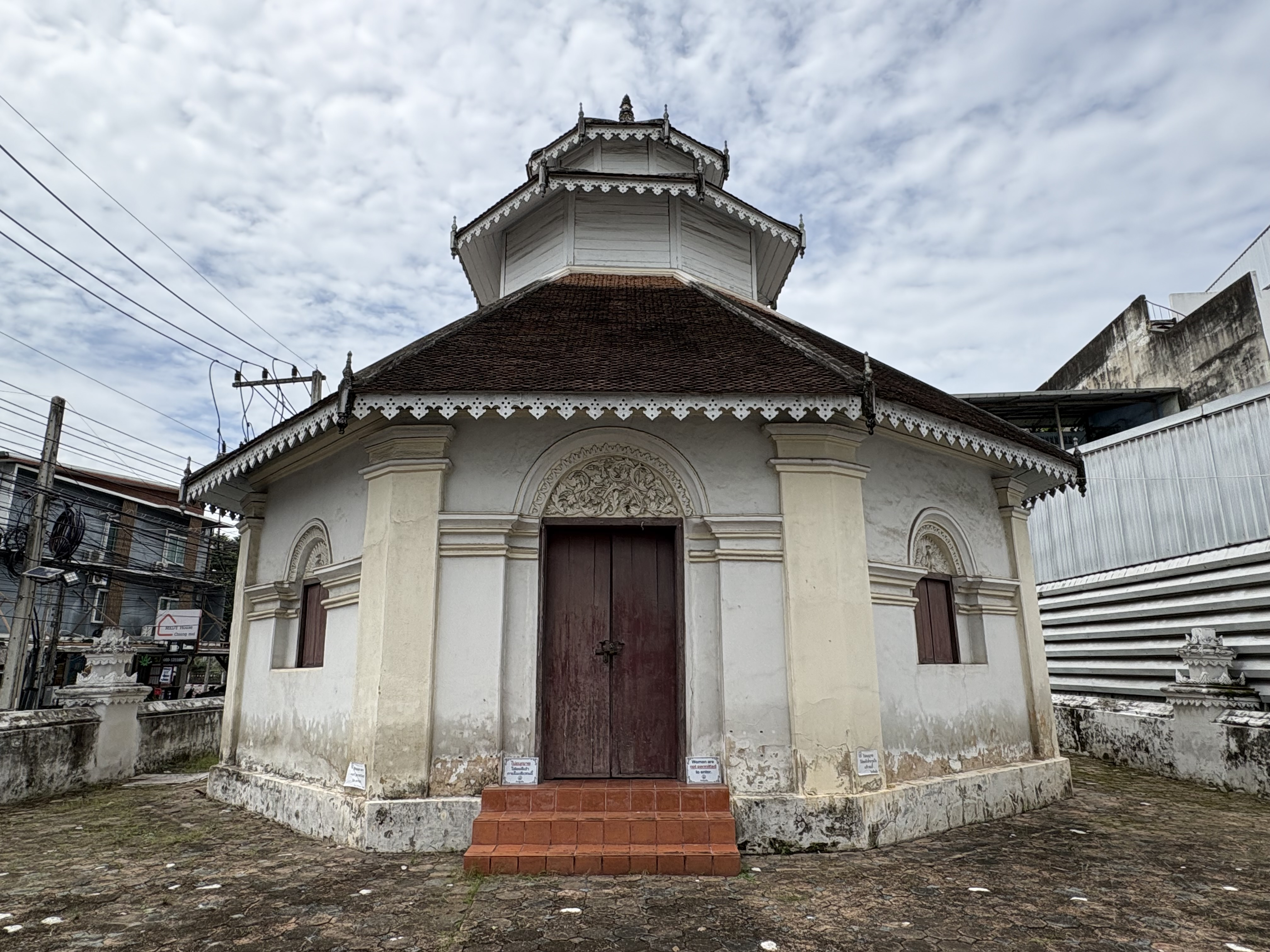
The octagonal ubosot, located in the temple's school
