= Chiang Yuen =

Chiang Yuen may refer to:

- Chiang Yuen District, Maha Sarakham, Thailand
- Wat Chiang Yuen, Buddhist temple in Chiang Mai, Thailand
