= Khuang Singh Monument =

- ᨢ᩠᩵ᩅᨦᩈᩥᨦ᩠ᩉ᩺ (Northern Thai); ข่วงสิงห์ (Thai)
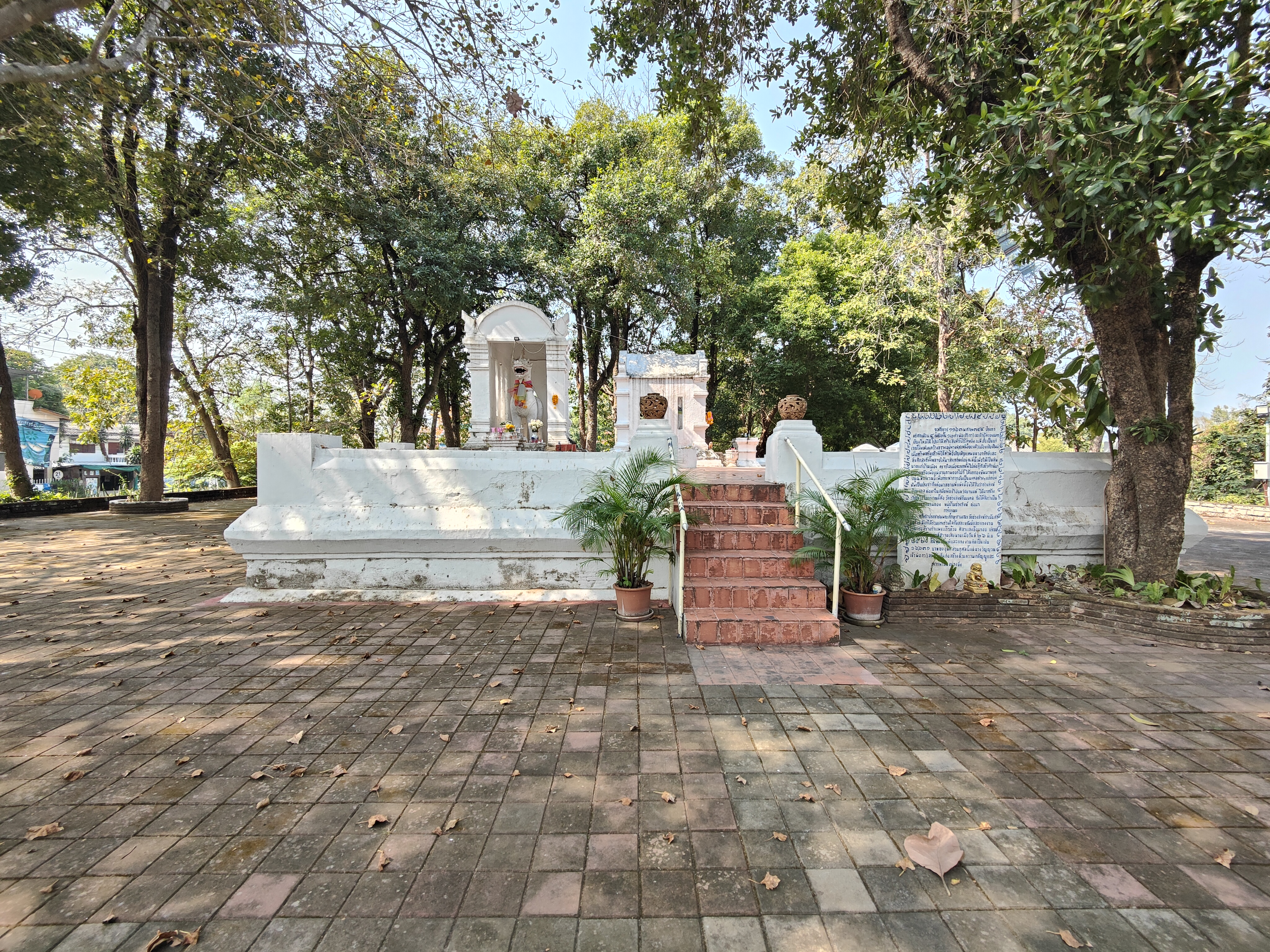
- Khuang Singh in 2024
- Interactive map of Khuang Singh Monument
- 18.81356°N 98.98209°E
- Location: Chang Phueak, Mueang Chiang Mai district, Chiang Mai Province, Thailand

History
- Built: 1801
- Built for: Symbolized Chiang Mai's renewed power and deterred future Burmese invasions

Site notes
- Architectural style: Lan Na
- Governing body: Fine Arts Department

Khuang Singh Monument (Northern Thai: ᨢ᩠᩵ᩅᨦᩈᩥᨦ᩠ᩉ᩺; Thai: อนุสาวรีย์ข่วงสิงห์; also known as the Twin Lions Monument) is a historical monument of two singhs (lions) in Chiang Mai, Thailand. It was built by King Kawila in 1801, mirroring the style of the Chang Phueak Monument. Surrounded by a pond, the lions symbolized Chiang Mai's renewed power and deterred future Burmese invasions. The twin lions are considered guardian deities who protect the city and are a sacred site revered by the people of Chiang Mai.

== History ==
The monument was built during the reign of King Kawila in 1801, located about 2 kilometers north of Chiang Mai city. The two lion statues face east and north, respectively. Before going into battle, troops would stop at this site to perform a ceremony to bring good fortune. Later, the intersection became known as Khwang Sing Chai Mongkon (Auspicious Lion Intersection).

King Inthawichayanon, the 7th ruler of Chiang Mai (r. 1870–1897), later ordered the construction of a nearby temple, now known as Wat Khwang Singh. On March 8, 1935, the Fine Arts Department designated the monument as a national historical site. In 1996, to mark the 700th anniversary of Chiang Mai, government and private organizations collaborated to restore and enhance the Khwang Singh Monument and its surroundings. The restoration included excavating a moat and constructing a wide, brick-paved platform with stairs leading up from the east. The lion statues, each standing about 2 meters tall and painted white, are enclosed within the site.

Today, it remains a sacred site where newly appointed governors of Chiang Mai pay their respects to seek blessings. Since its completion, a ceremony has been held annually to invite guardian deities and sacred spirits to reside at this location. Over 300 mediums participated in the ceremony, offering sacrifices and performing traditional dances to honor these guardian spirits.

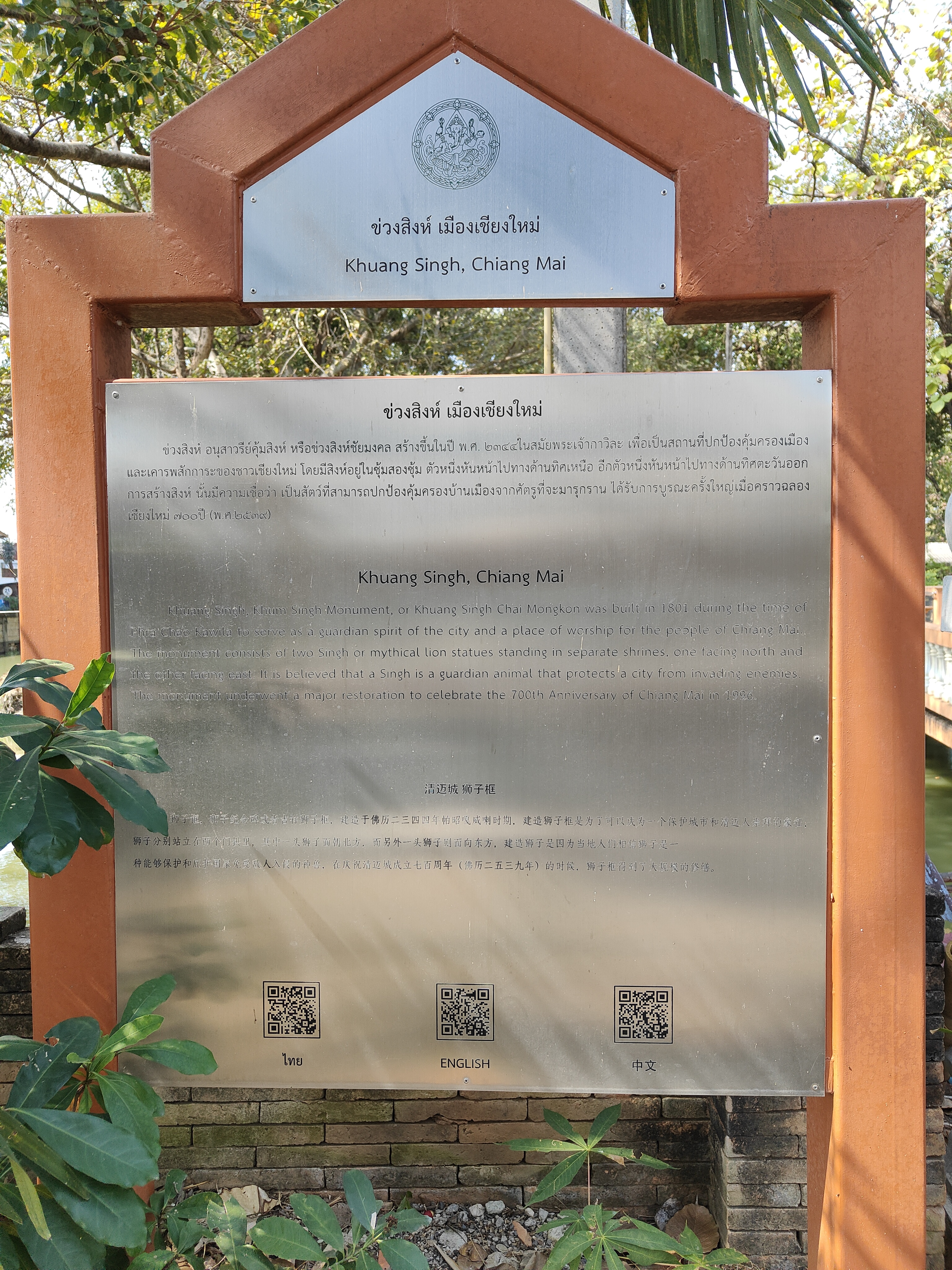
Local information about the monument

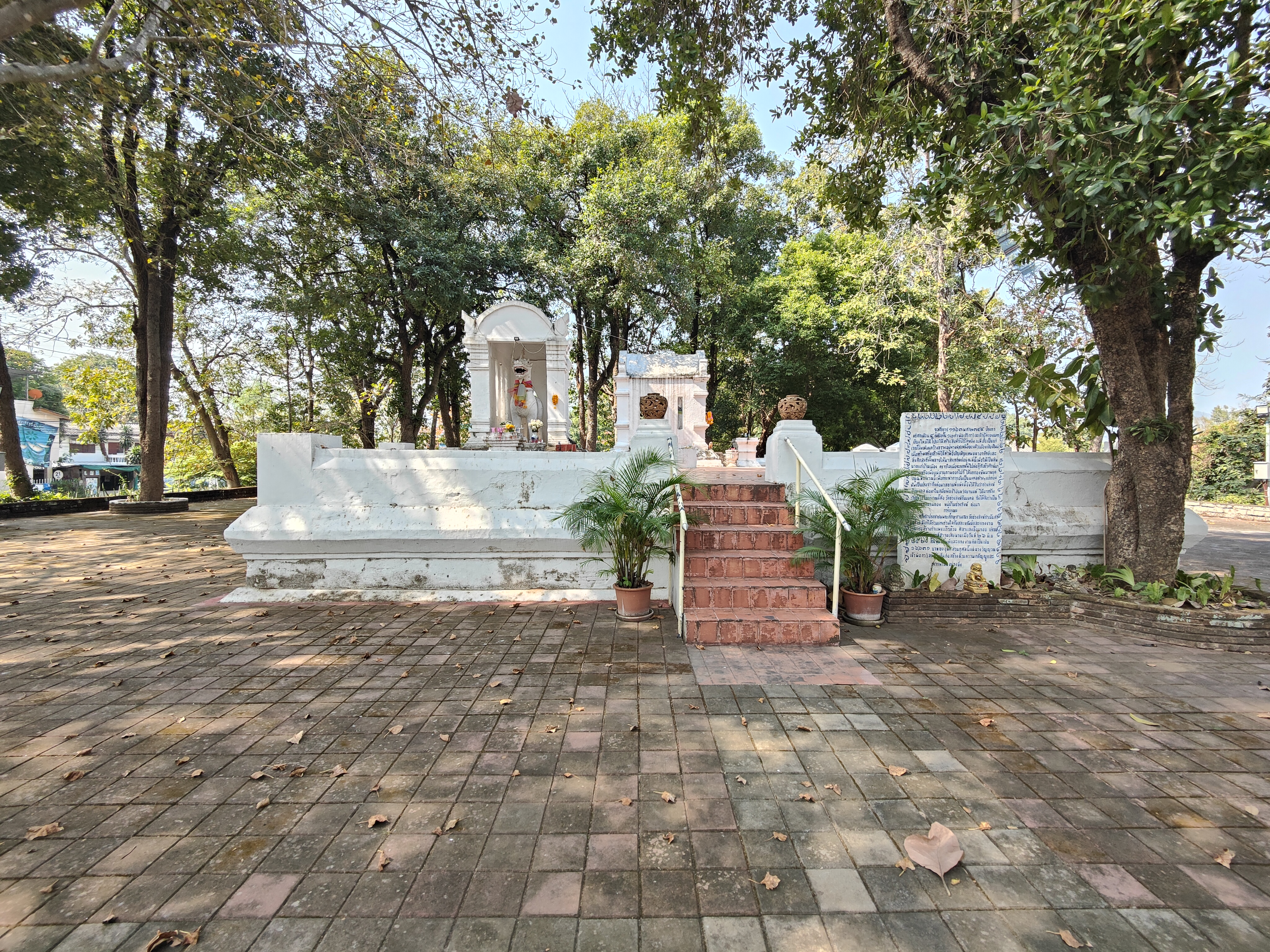
Overview of the monument from the east

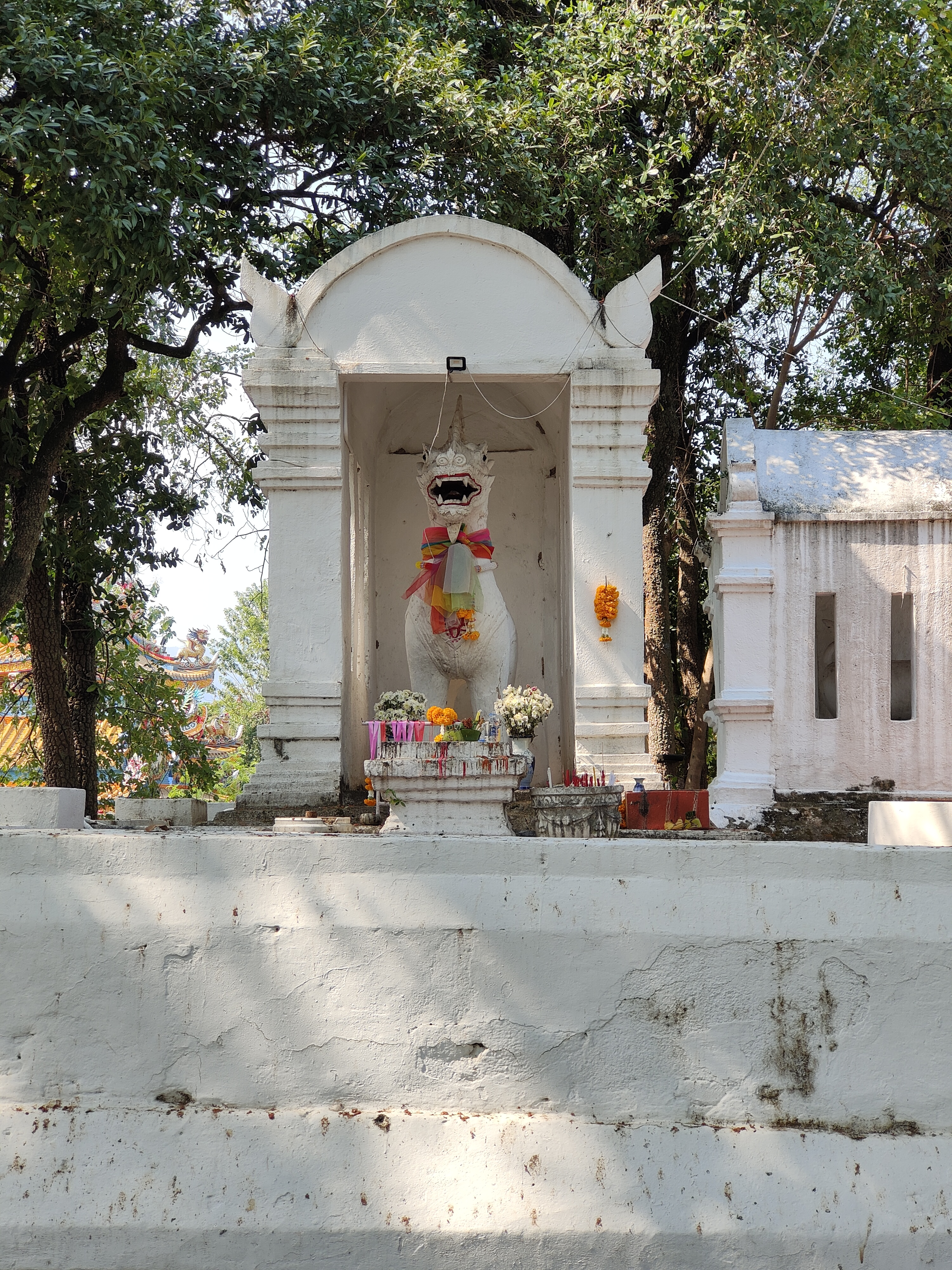
Lion statue facing east

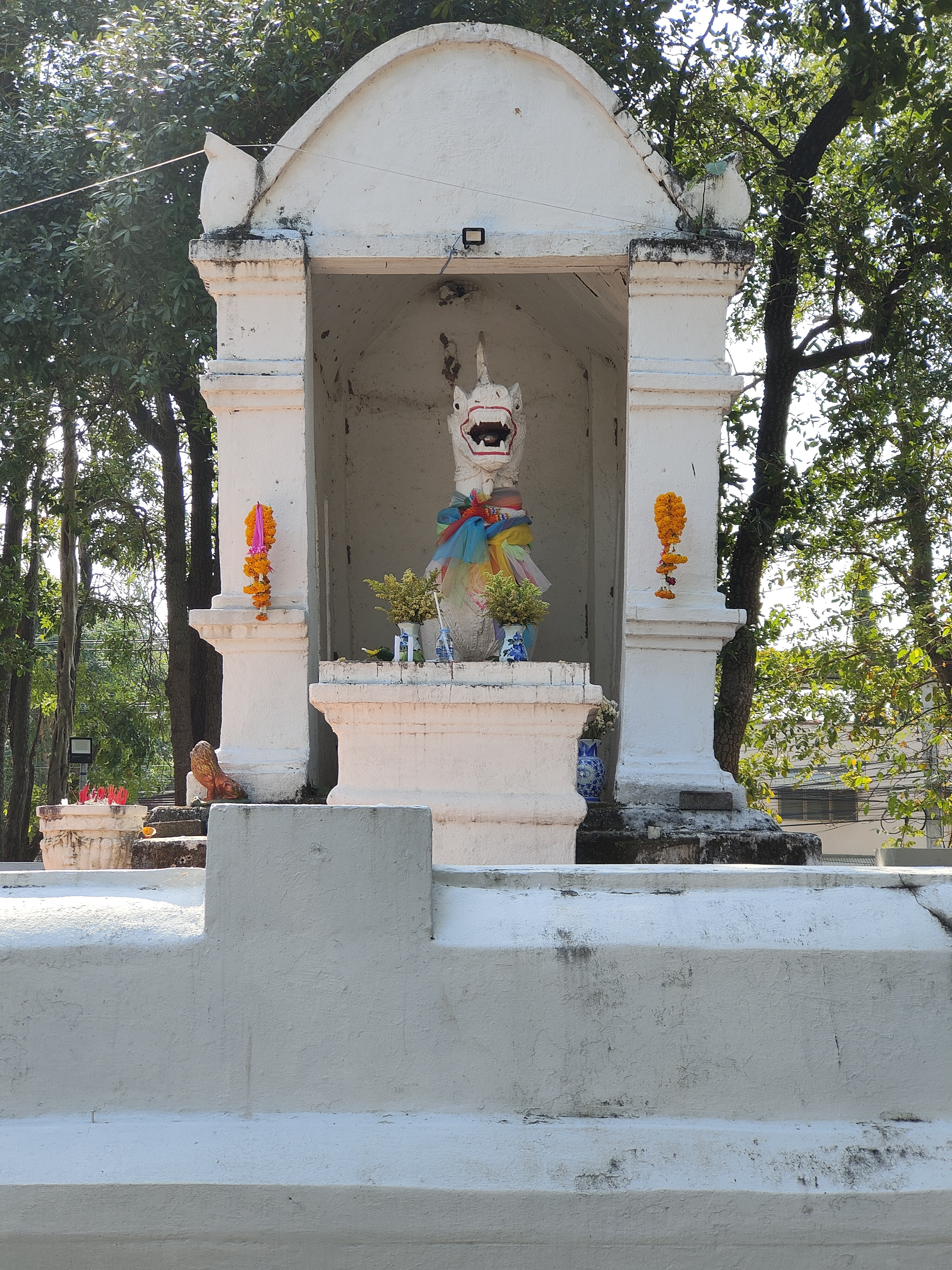
Lion statue facing north
