= Wat Traimit Museum =

Museum in Bangkok, Thailand

Coordinates: 13.73692°N 100.510971°E

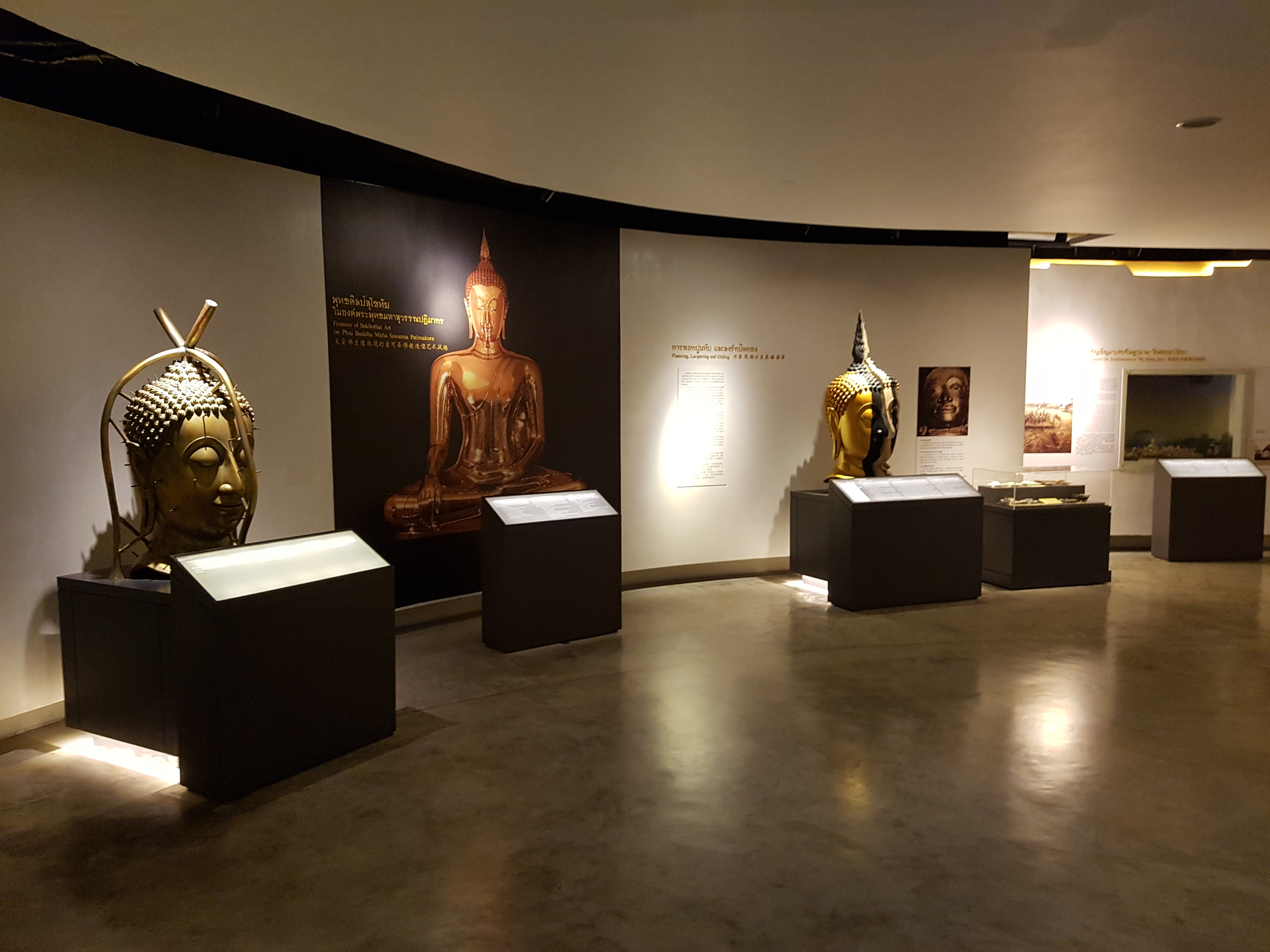
- Established: 2009
- Location: Wat Traimit, Charoen Krung Road, Bangkok
- Type: History museum

Wat Traimit Museum (Thai: พิพิธภัณฑ์วัดไตรมิตร) is a history museum located in Bangkok, Thailand. Situated within the Phra Maha Mondop building at Wat Traimit, which also houses the Golden Buddha image, the museum features exhibitions dedicated to the statue's history on the building's third floor, as well as the Yaowarat Chinatown Heritage Center (ศูนย์ประวัติศาสตร์เยาวราช) on the second floor.

The Chinatown Heritage Center focuses on the history of early Chinese immigrants in Siam, particularly in the Yaowarat area, which serves as Bangkok's Chinatown. It comprises six permanent exhibitions: Growing Up under the Royal Umbrella, The Birth of the Chinese Community of Rattanakosin (1782–1851), The Path to the Golden Age (1851–1957), Hall of Fame, Phra Barami Pok Klao, and Yaowarat Today.
