= Golden Buddha (statue) =

5.5 tonnes golden ancient Buddha statue in Bangkok, Thailand

Coordinates: 13°44′17″N 100°30′50″E

Phra Phuttha Maha Suwanna Patimakon
- พระพุทธมหาสุวรรณปฏิมากร
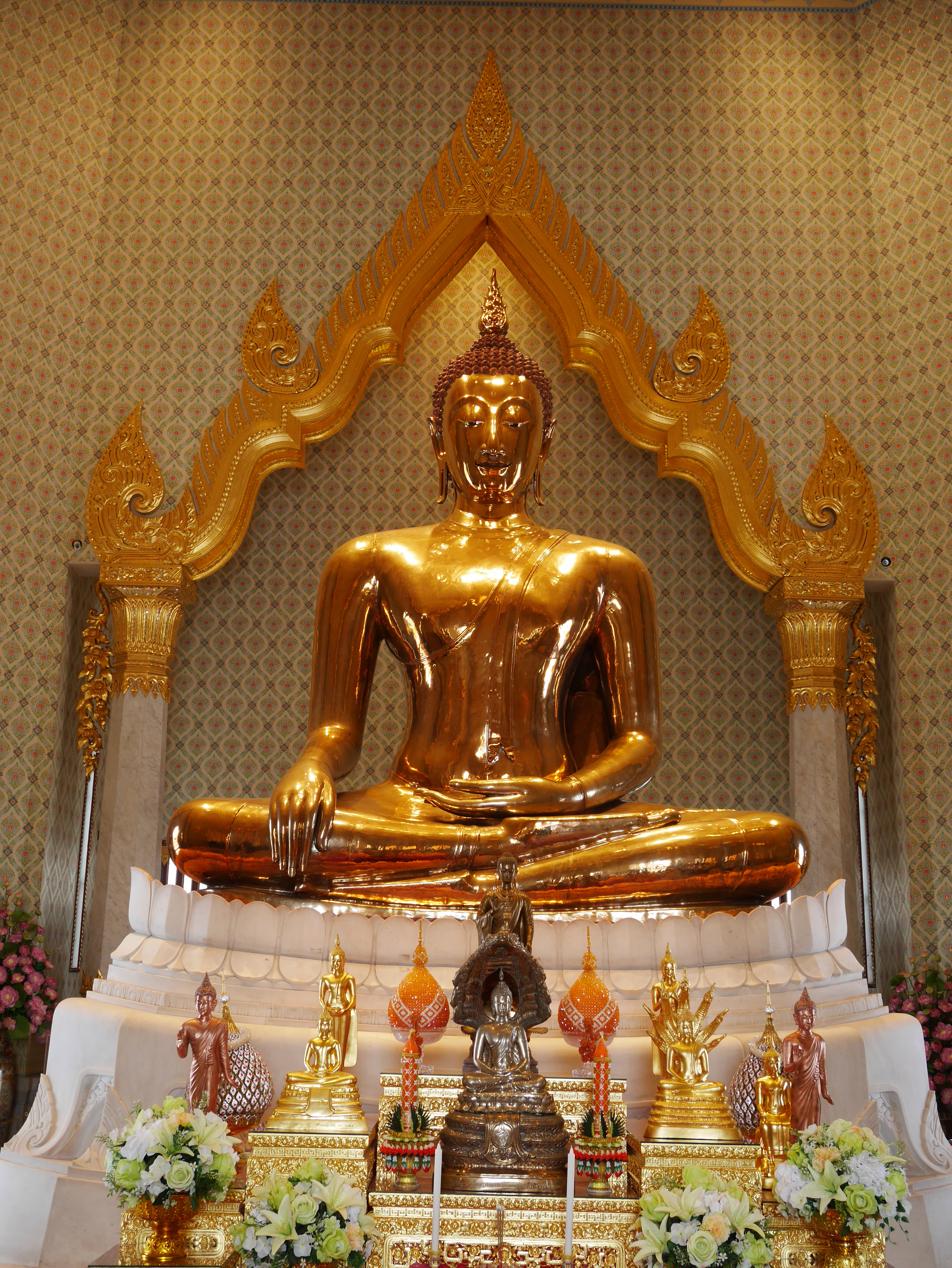
- The Golden Buddha at Wat Traimit, Bangkok
- Interactive map of Phra Phuttha Maha Suwanna Patimakon
- Location: Wat Traimit, Samphanthawong, Bangkok, Thailand
- Type: Buddha statue (Maravijaya attitude)
- Material: Gold
- Height: 3 m (9.8 ft)
- Weight: 5.5 t (12,000 lb)
- Dedicated to: Gautama Buddha

The Golden Buddha (Thai: หลวงพ่อทองคำ, RTGS: Luang Pho Thongkham), officially titled Phra Phuttha Maha Suwanna Patimakon (Thai: พระพุทธมหาสุวรรณปฏิมากร; Sanskrit: Buddhamahāsuvarṇapaṭimākara), commonly known in Thai as Phra Sukhothai Traimit (Thai: พระสุโขทัยไตรมิตร), is a gold Maravijaya Attitude seated Buddharupa statue, with a weight of 5.5 tonnes (12,000 lb). It is located in the temple of Wat Traimit, Bangkok, Thailand. At one point in its history, the statue was covered with a layer of stucco and coloured glass to conceal its true value, and it remained in this condition for almost 200 years, ending up at what was then a pagoda of minor significance. During relocation of the statue in 1955, the plaster was chipped off and the beautiful shining gold revealed. Guinness World Records recognizes the image as both the world's largest solid gold sculpture and, by intrinsic gold value, the most valuable object of religion.

== History ==
The origins of the statue are uncertain. It is crafted in the Sukhothai style of the 13th–14th centuries, although it may have been made somewhat later. The head of the statue is egg-shaped, a typical characteristic of Sukhothai art in its most refined and fully developed phase. Given that Sukhothai sculpture was influenced by Indian aesthetics, and that metal images of the Buddha from India were widely exported during the Pala period, it is possible that this statue reflects that influence.

Later, the statue was probably moved from Sukhothai to Ayutthaya, about 1403.

Some scholars believe the statue is mentioned in the somewhat controversial Ram Khamhaeng stele. In lines 23–27 of the first stone slab of the stele, "a gold Buddha image" is mentioned as being located "in the middle of Sukhothai City", interpreted as being a reference to the Wat Traimit Golden Buddha.

At some point, the statue was completely plastered over to prevent it from being stolen. The statue was covered with a thick layer of stucco, which was painted and inlaid with bits of coloured glass. It is believed that this plastering-over took place before the destruction of Ayutthaya kingdom by Burmese invaders in 1767. The statue remained among the ruins of Ayutthaya without attracting much attention.

During the reign of King Rama III (1824–1851), the statue — still entirely covered in stucco — was installed as the principal Buddha image in the main hall of Wat Chotanaram (also known as Wat Phraya Krai) in Bangkok. This image, together with other large Buddha images of similar style, is believed to have been brought from the northern centers of Sukhothai and Si Satchanalai to Bangkok in the early Rattanakosin period, at a time when thousands of Buddha images were being relocated to the capital and installed in its monasteries. Some of these images were formally granted by the kings to be enshrined in temples founded or restored by members of the royal family and the nobility. It is therefore plausible that Phraya Krai Kosha, a senior official in close service to King Rama III, received royal permission to acquire and install the two large Buddha images as the principal icons of worship in Wat Chotanaram, the temple he founded.

When Wat Chotanaram, located near Chinatown on the site of modern-day Asiatique, fell into disrepair and was closed, the statue was moved to its present location at the nearby Wat Traimit in 1935. At the time, Wat Traimit was a pagoda of minor significance (like hundreds of other Buddhist temples that exist in Bangkok). Since the temple didn't have a building big enough to house the statue, it was kept for 20 years under a simple tin roof. The true identity of this statue had been forgotten for almost 200 years.

=== Discovery of the golden statue ===
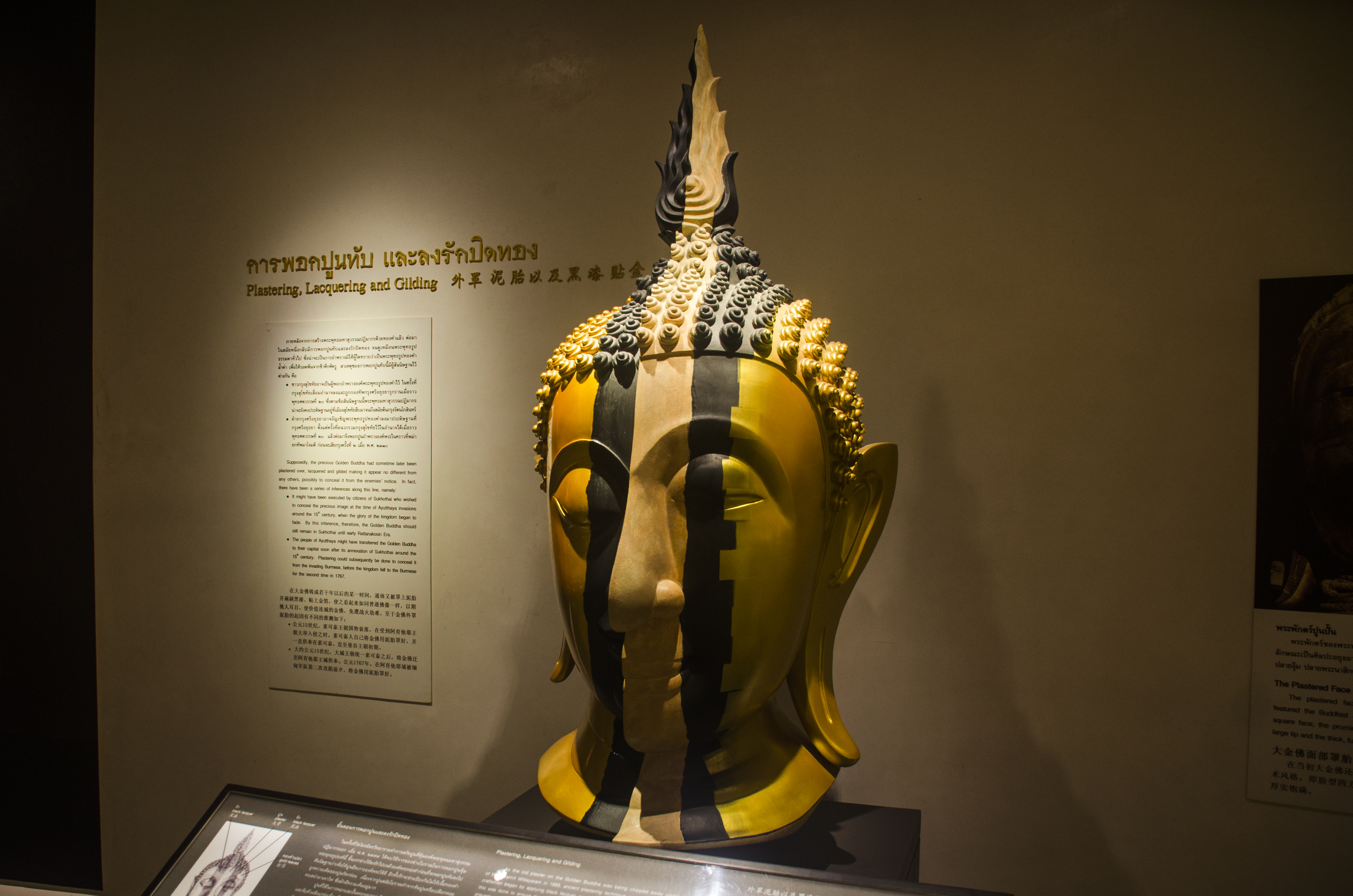
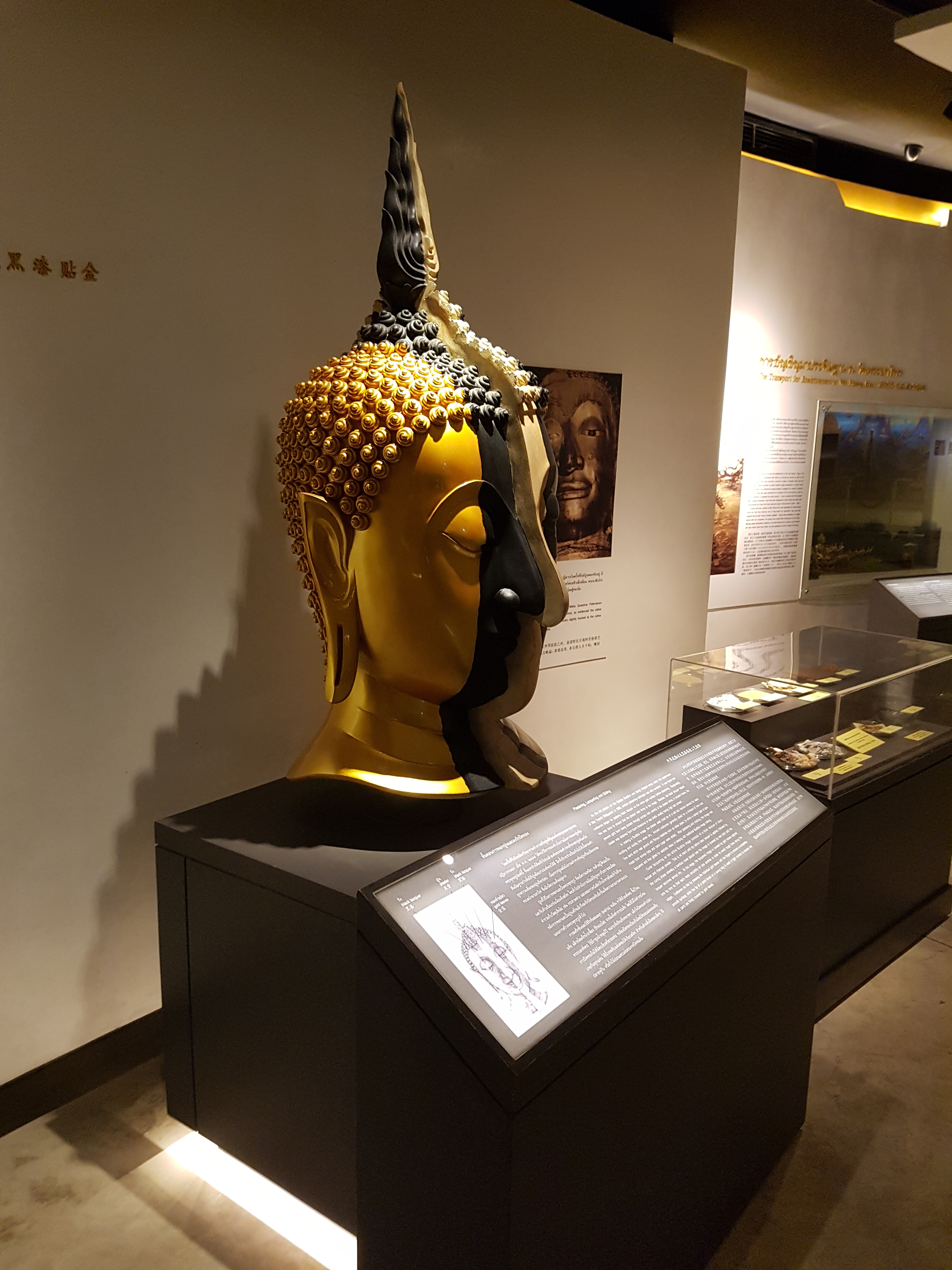
This model shows how the Golden Buddha was once hidden beneath layers of plaster, lacquer, and gilding. One side reveals the plain exterior that concealed the statue for centuries. Exhibit at Wat Traimit Museum, Bangkok.

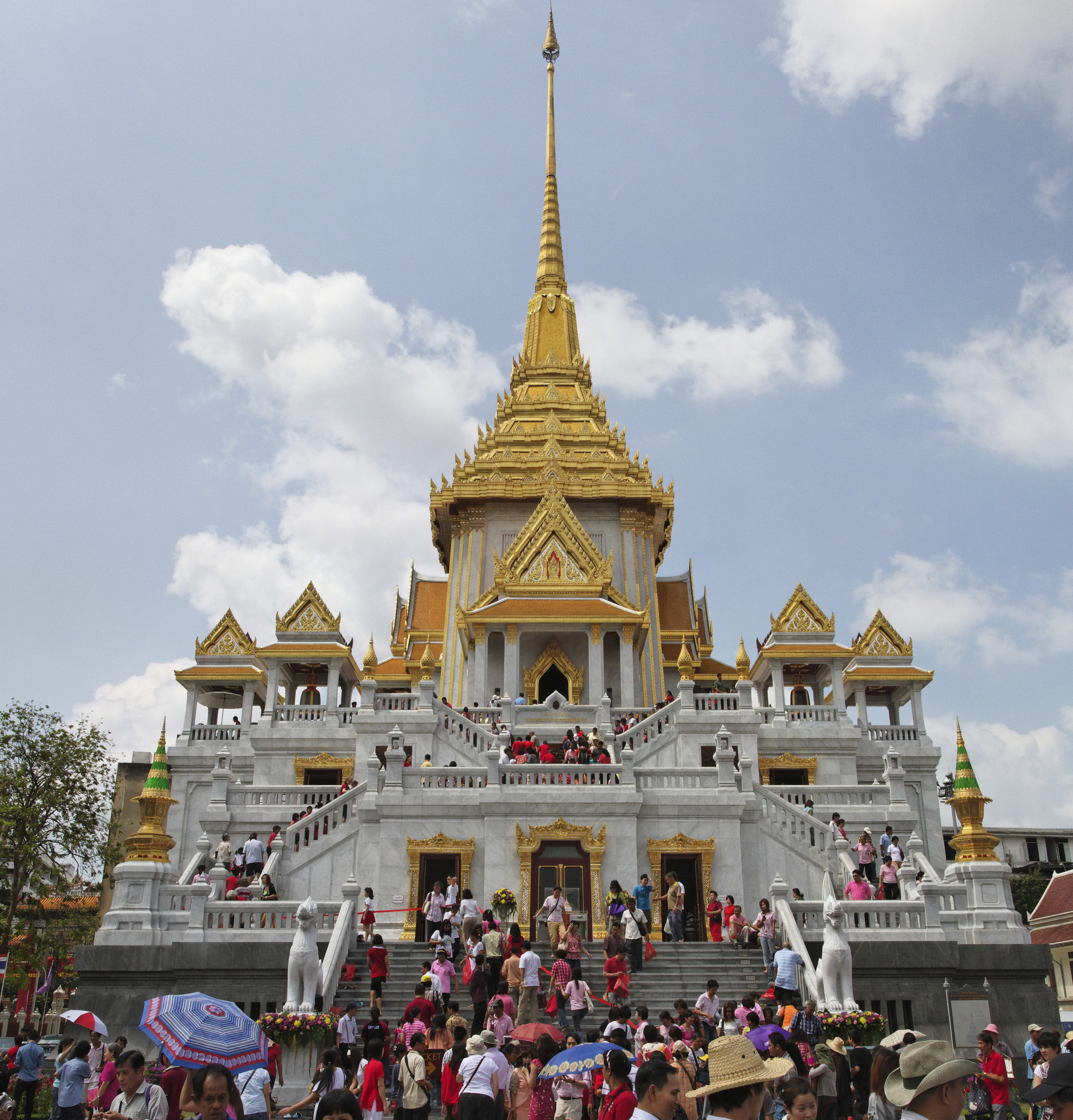
The new building at the Wat Traimit temple

In 1954, a new Viharn building was built at the temple to house the statue. It was moved to its new location on 25 May 1955; there are a variety of accounts of what exactly happened next, but it is clear that during the final attempt to lift the statue from its pedestal, the ropes broke and the statue fell hard on the ground. At that moment, some of the plaster coating chipped off, allowing the gold surface underneath to be seen. Work was immediately stopped so that an evaluation could be made on the statue.

All the plaster was carefully removed and during the process, photos were taken and are now displayed in the Temple for visitors. Pieces of the actual plaster are also on public display. When all the plaster was removed, it was found that the gold statue actually consisted of ten parts that fit smoothly together. A key was also found encased in plaster at its base, which can be used to disassemble the statue, allowing for easier transportation.

The golden statue was discovered very close to the commemoration of the twenty-fifth Buddhist Era (2500 years since Gautama Buddha's passing) so the Thai news media was full of reports and many Buddhists regarded the occurrence as miraculous.

On 14 February 2010, a large new building was inaugurated at the Wat Traimit Temple to house the Gold Buddha. The building also contains the Bangkok Chinatown Heritage Centre and an exhibition on the origin of the Gold Buddha.

== Characteristics ==
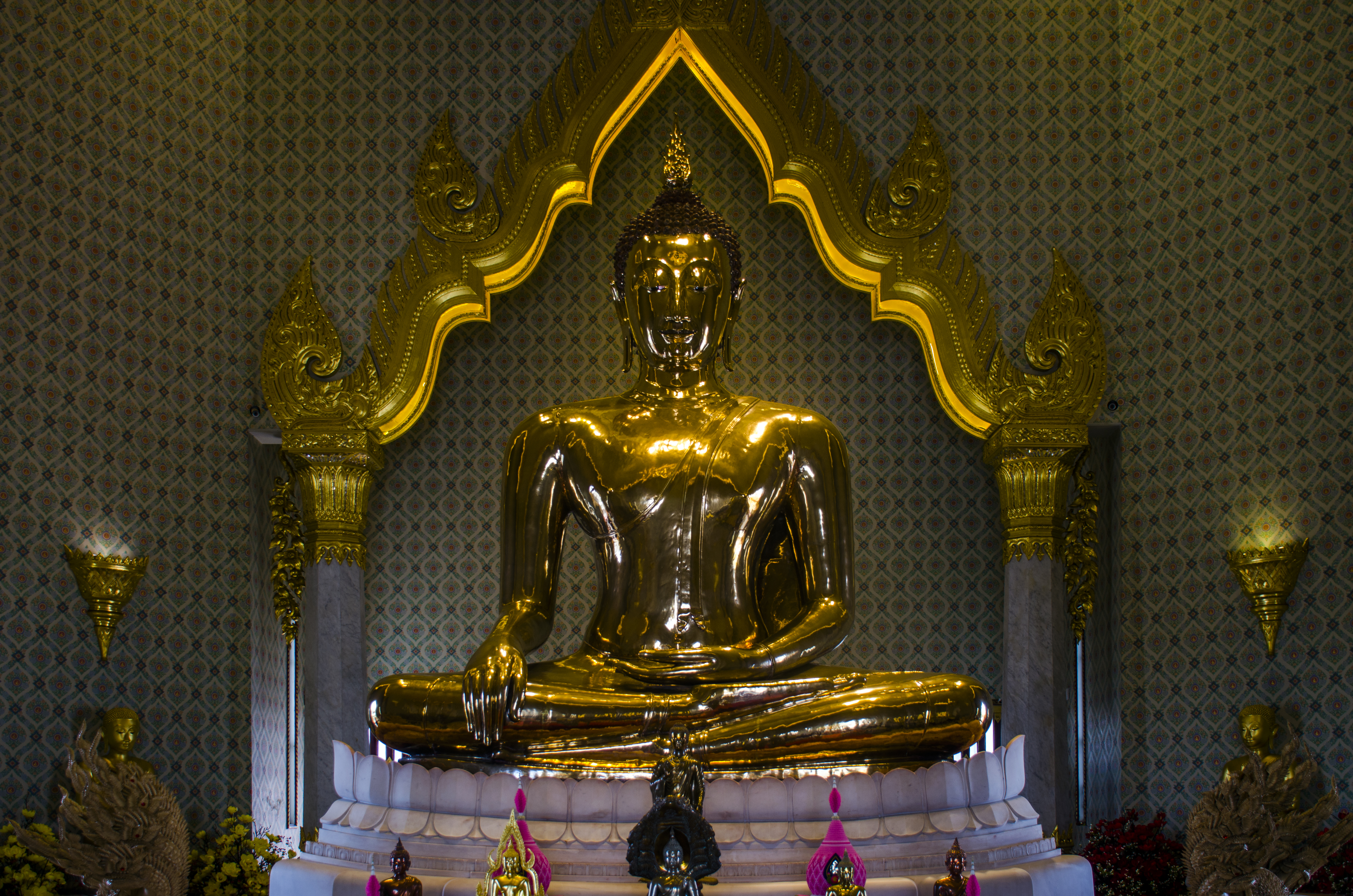
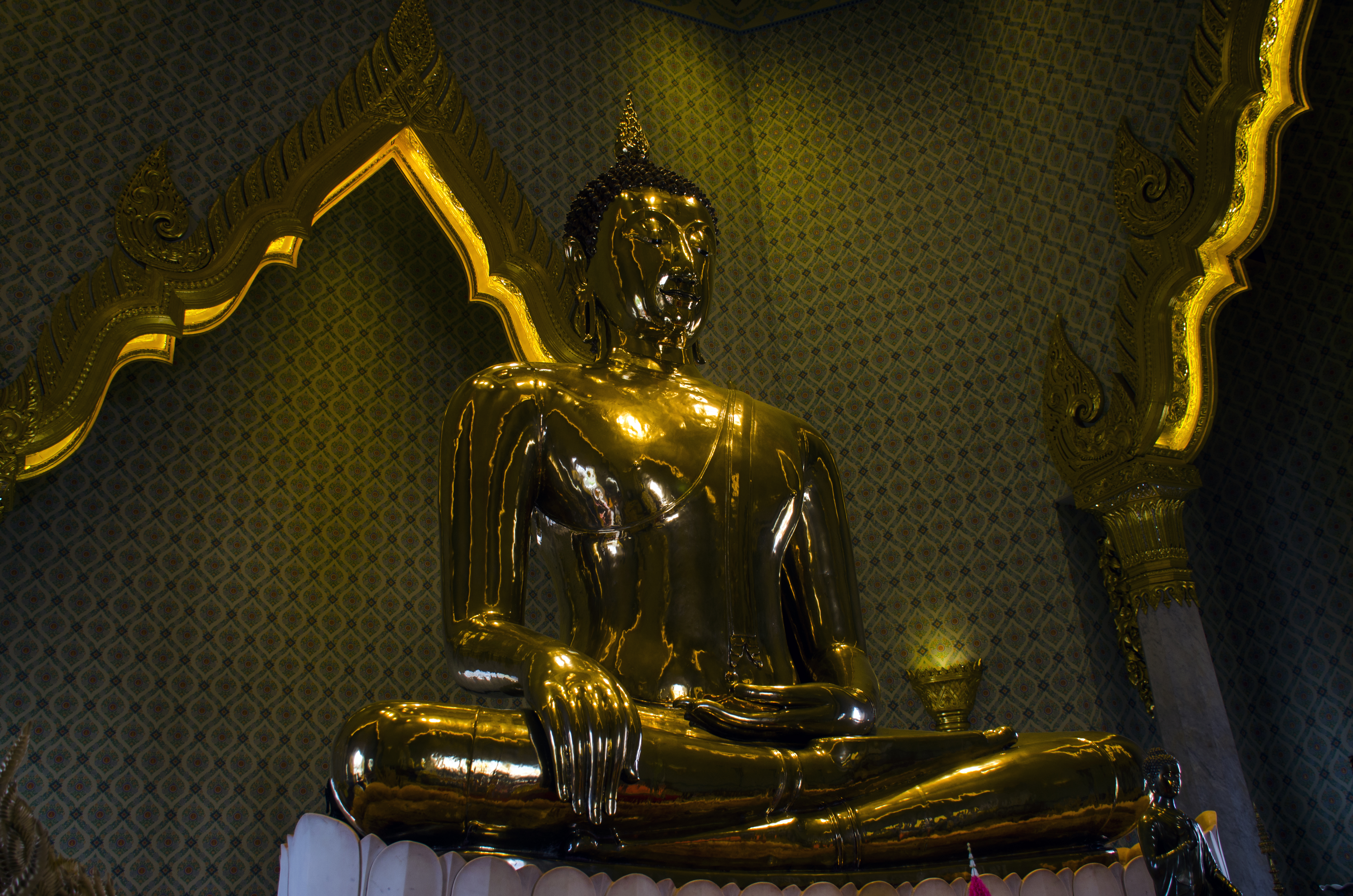
The Golden Buddha, the world's largest solid gold sculpture
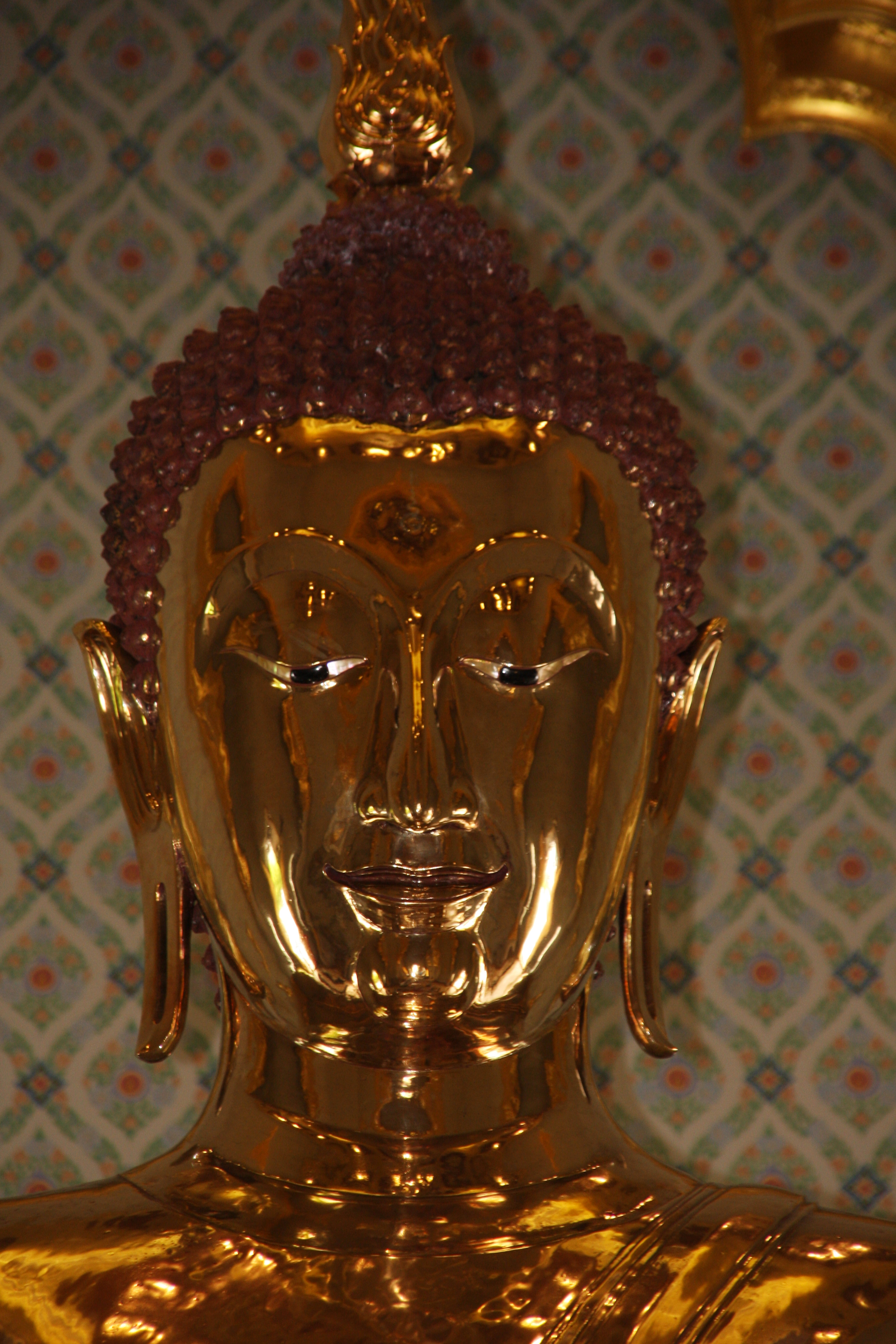
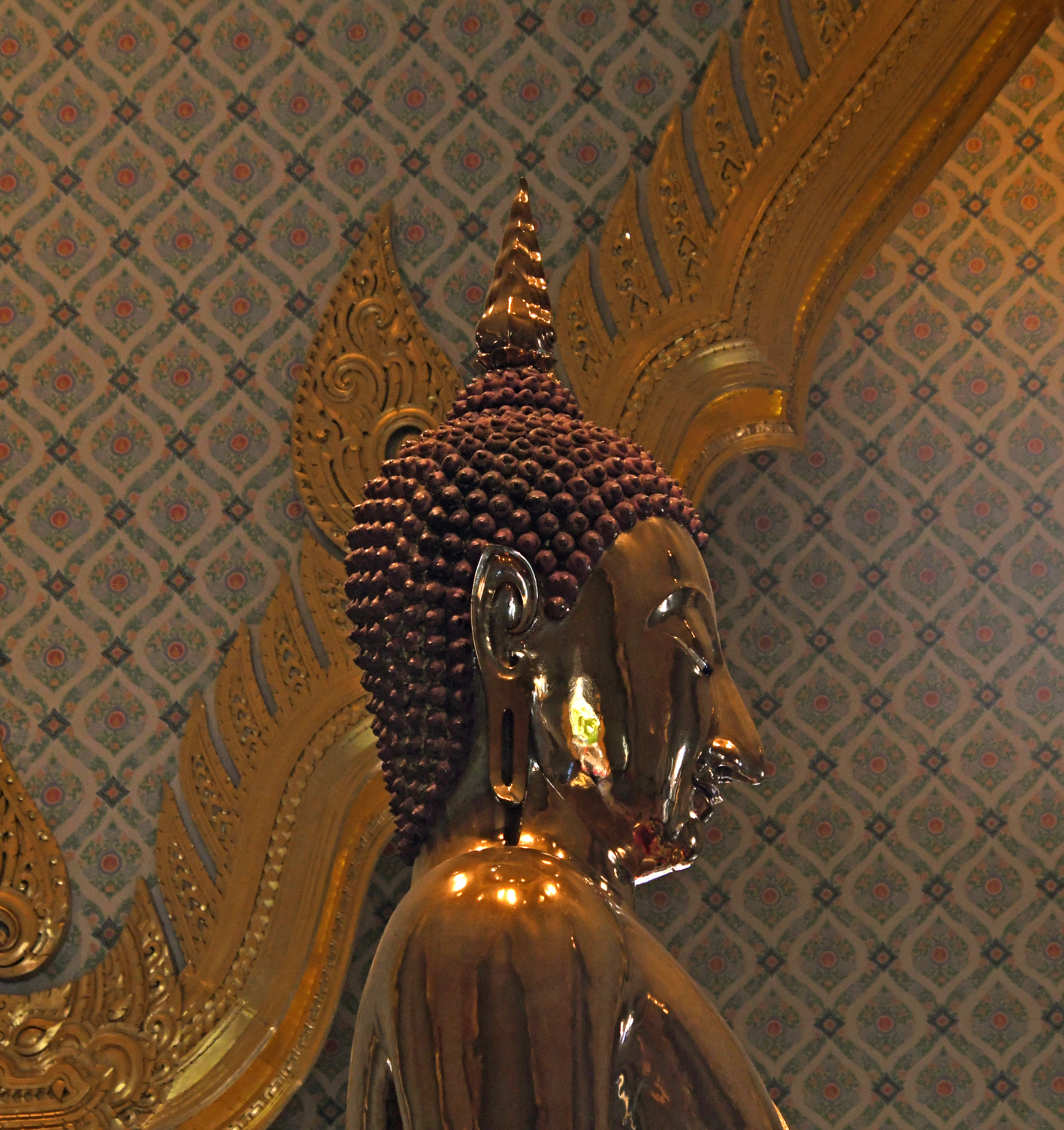
The shape of the statue's head dates it to the Sukhothai period

The statue is 3 metres (9.8 ft) tall and weighs 5.5 tonnes (5.4 long tons; 6.1 short tons). According to alternative measurements, the statue stands 3.91 meters from the base to the flame top and 3.10 meters across the lap. In 1991, the Guinness Book of Records recognized it as the "sacred object with the highest intrinsic value," with its gold content valued at £21.1 million (later updated to £109 million in 2008).

The Golden Buddha was crafted using the traditional lost-wax casting technique, with the gold thickness ranging from 1 to 1.5 cm. Due to its immense size, the statue was cast in nine separate sections—including the head, the torso, the lap, and three pieces for each arm—allowing it to be completely disassembled.

The Buddha is represented in the traditional pose of Bhumisparsha Mudra (touching the earth with the right hand to bear witness Lord Buddha's enlightenment at Bodh Gaya and victory over Mara). The original statues of Sukhothai sit on a common pedestal form. The flame that crowns the ushnisha is an innovation of Sukhothai that symbolises the splendour of spiritual energy. The line of the hairdressing forms a "V" shape in the root of the hairs, underlined by the elegant curve of the eyebrows that join above the aquiline nose, all according to the prescribed rules. The three wrinkles in the neck and the much elongated ear lobes, signs of his former status of prince, also form part of the code, as do the wide shoulders and the chest inflated.
