= Buddha in art =

Depictions of Gautama Buddha

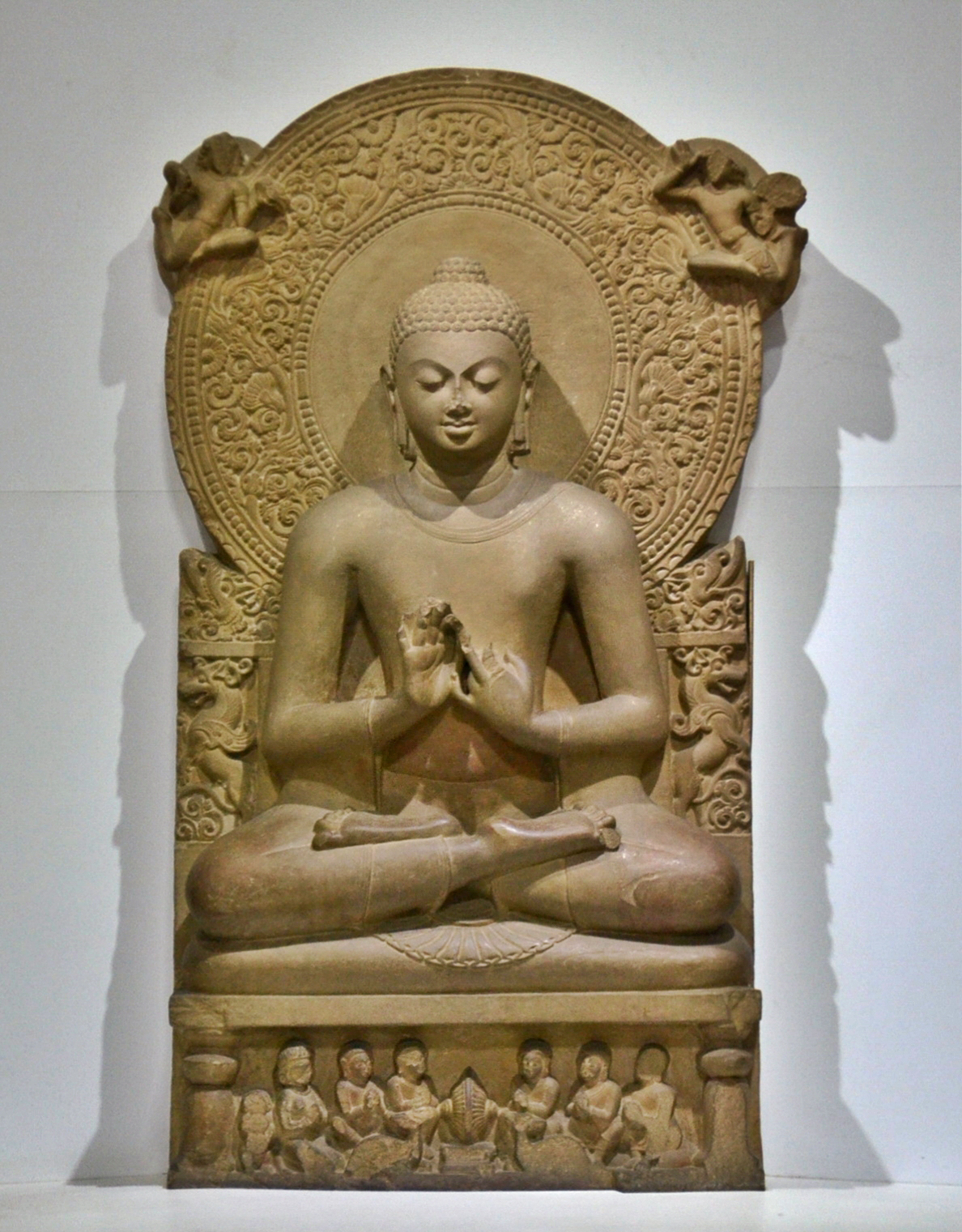
Buddha Preaching his First Sermon, from Sarnath, Gupta period (c. 475 CE), India. The hands of the Buddha, in the dharmachakra pravartana mudra ("teaching position"), show the moment that is represented.

Much Buddhist art depicts the historical Buddha, Gautama Buddha, in forms known as Buddharūpa (lit. 'Form of the Awakened One') in Sanskrit and Pali. These may be statues or other images such as paintings. The main figure in an image may also represent another individual who has attained Buddhahood, or a bodhisattva, especially within the various traditions of Mahayana Buddhism. Other Buddhas and bodhisattvas in art have become increasingly common over the centuries, perhaps now even outnumbering images of the historical Buddha.

In its first centuries Buddhism was largely or entirely aniconic, not showing the person of Buddha except by symbols and relics. This changed, and figures of the Buddha became very common in the art of Gandhara and Gupta art. As forms of esoteric Buddhism developed, other figures from the expanding array of Buddhist sacred persons became more prominent. In Theravada Buddhism this was much less the case, and figures of the historical Buddha remain the most common main images in temples and shrines to the present.

Early images were most often of Buddha standing, but seated meditating postures, essentially the lotus position of yoga, came to predominate. Often these represent a specific moment in the Buddha's life, which is identified by the Buddha's hand gesture (mudra), or attributes shown. There are also statues of the Reclining Buddha, lying down, usually showing the moment of his death.

Sets of narrative scenes from the life of the Buddha tend to concentrate on standard groupings such as the Eight Great Events or other sets, but may be much larger. Originally common in reliefs, and probably paintings of which few have survived, they have more recently mostly been in painted form. Narrative scenes may show the Buddha in various poses, though they tend to show the Buddha in the same standing, seated or lying positions, with other figures or a mudra indicating what moment is being depicted.

== Commonalities ==
Despite cultural and regional differences in the interpretations of texts about the life of Gautama Buddha, there are some general guidelines to the attributes of a Buddharupa:

- Fingers and toes are elongated proportionately
- Long, aquiline nose
- Elongated earlobes
- Head protuberance
- Broad shoulders

The elongated earlobes are vestiges of his life as a prince, when he wore extravagant jewelry. The bump at the top of the head is the ushnisha and represents spirituality, wisdom, and awakening.

== Regional variations ==
Depictions of the Buddha vary widely across cultures.

=== Proportions ===
The image of Buddhas started to emerge from the first century CE in North India, developed in Gandhara and Mathura. The art of Gandhara was influenced by Ancient Greek art, leading to the development of Greco-Buddhist art with anatomically well-proportioned and realistic figure of the Buddha. One of the most influential Buddhist art was Gupta art and the later Amaravati style. From India the depiction of Buddha spread to the rest of Asia. The Buddharupas of India, Sri Lanka, Javanese Sailendra and Cambodian art usually depict a well-proportioned figure, but sometimes he is shown emaciated, in recollection of the Buddha's years of ascetic practices.

Many people may be familiar with the "Happy" or "Laughing" Buddha, a different historical figure, who should not be confused with the images of Gautama Buddha. Budai, a Chinese Buddhist monk also known as Hotei, is depicted as fat and happy, almost always shown smiling or laughing, and is associated with Maitreya, the future Buddha.

=== Postures, gestures and artifacts ===
A statue or a painting of Buddha always illustrates a mudra or gesture. There are large numbers of these, but a few are the oldest and most common. In Mahayana Buddhism, some of the most common have also become identified with the five transcendental Buddhas, also called "Dhyani Buddhas" or "Pancha Buddhas", further complicating identification of the figure shown. These mudras are as follows:

- Dharmachakra Buddha Mudra – Vairochana: Dharmachakra mudra has two hands held against the chest with the tips of the thumbs and forefingers of each hand united. This mudra represents a gesture of teaching.
- Bhumisparsa Buddha Mudra – Akshobhya: This gesture, "touching the earth" (Bhumisparsa) mudra, became Buddha Akshobhya's mudra. The Buddha called upon mother earth to bear witness to his attainment of Enlightenment. To indicate this, he touched the earth with his right hand as witness to his perfection. This mudra is related to the Maravijaya attitude.
- Varada Buddha Mudra – Ratna Sambhava: In this mudra right hand lies open near his right knee. His left hand is seen holding an alms bowl. In Sanskrit, Varada means "granting a boon". The gesture shows the right palm turned towards the receiver of boons, with the fingers pointed downwards.
- Dhyana Buddha Mudra – Amitabha Buddha: This mudra has the left hand resting on the lap with the palm facing upwards, the right hand on the top of the left one (also with its palm facing upwards), and the two thumbs touching each other. Sometimes a bowl is placed above his palms. Here the meditating hand gesture represents a state of deep meditation and the unity of wisdom and compassion.
- Abhaya Buddha Mudra – Amoghsiddhi: Abhaya mudra represents the hand gesture of fearlessness and protection. The gesture of fearlessness and protection, usually shown as the left hand with palm turned outward and all fingers extended upwards. The symbolic meaning of the dispelling fear pose is an interpretation of the action of preaching. It is said that one gains fearlessness by following the Bodhisattva path.

Images of Buddha showing him reclining, represent his Parinirvana or departure into final nirvana at death.

Other times he is holding various symbolic objects, or making symbolic mudras (gestures).

The clothing also varies with national styles. In East Asia it tends to follow local monastic dress, with the arms covered. In India early depictions, especially from hotter regions, such as art of Mathura, Buddha is often shown with very thin robes or topless, with most of the body uncovered, or appearing so.

== Gallery ==
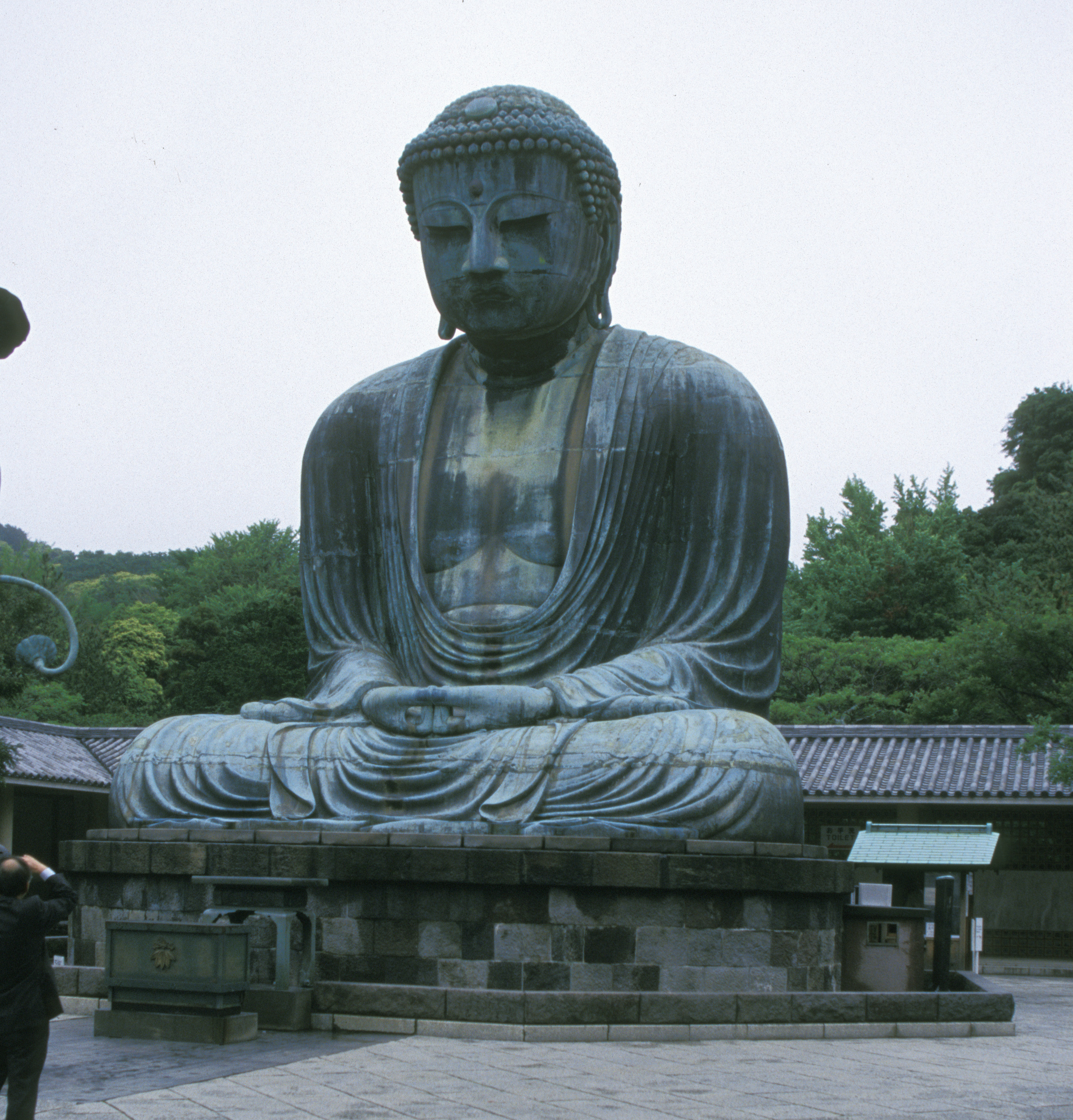
Giant Amida Buddha of Kamakura, Japan, 1252. This represents Amitābha, not the historical Buddha, though the depiction is very similar.

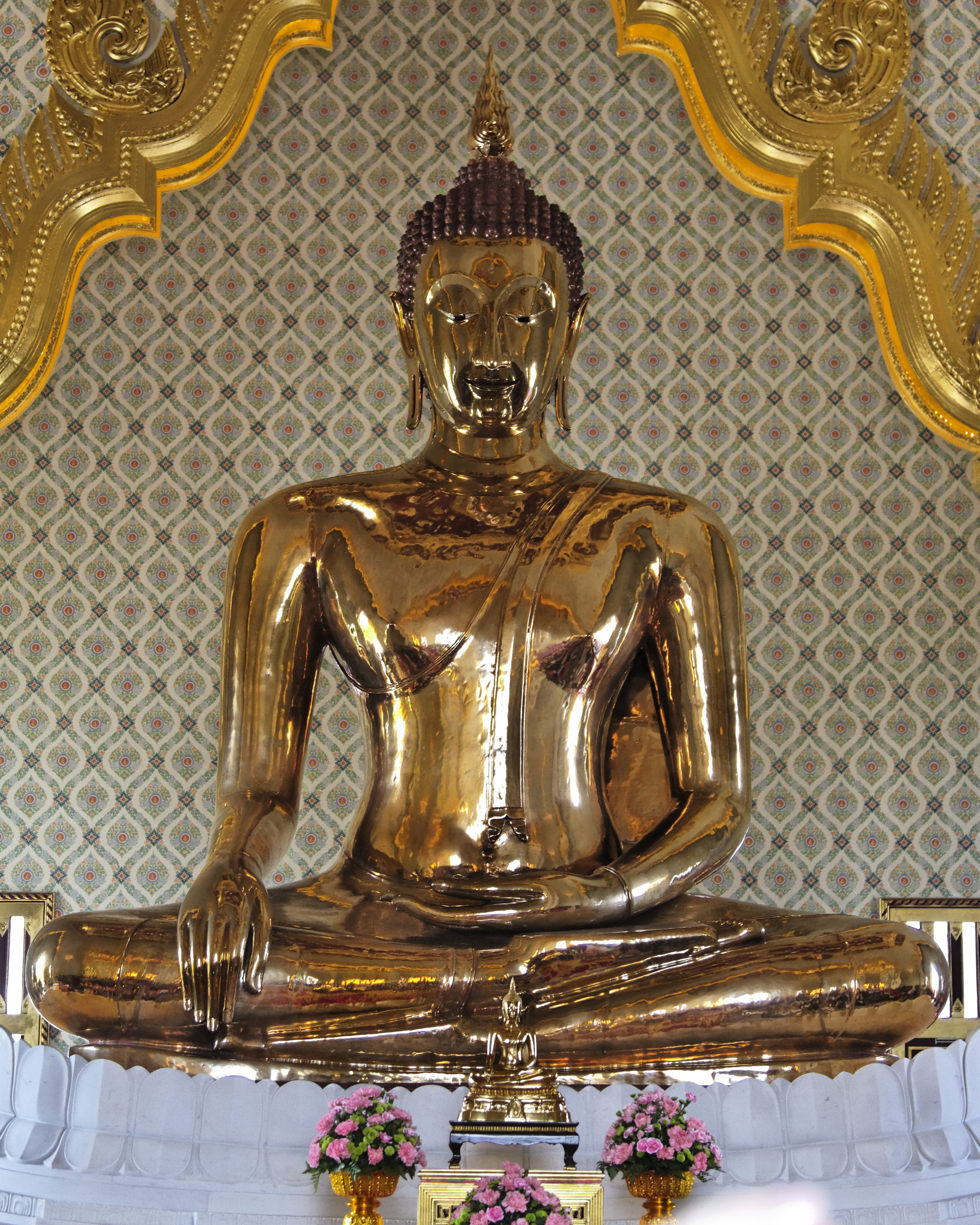
Golden Buddha of Wat Traimit, Bangkok, Thailand

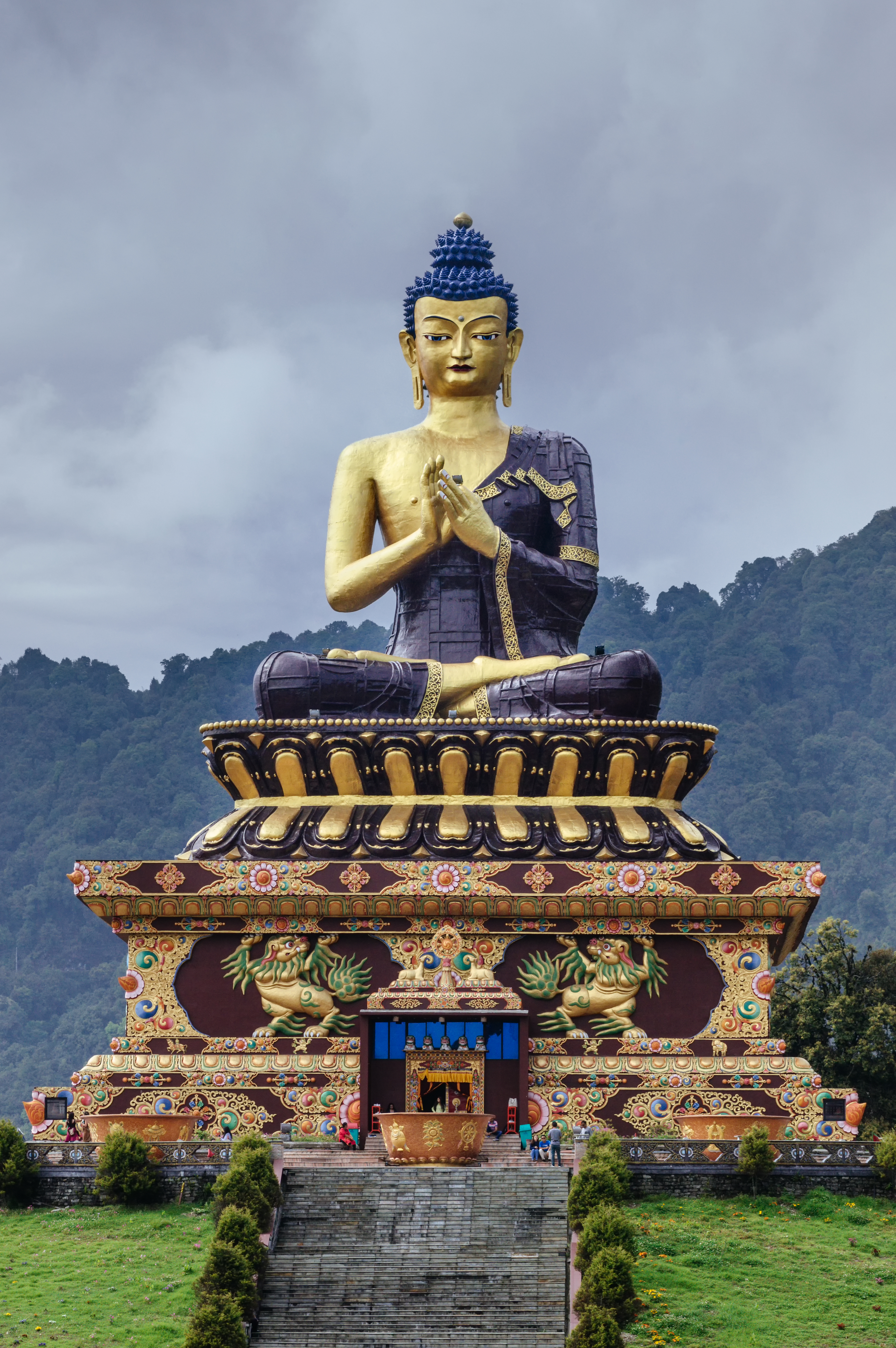
Large Gautama Buddha statue in Buddha Park of Ravangla, Sikkim, India

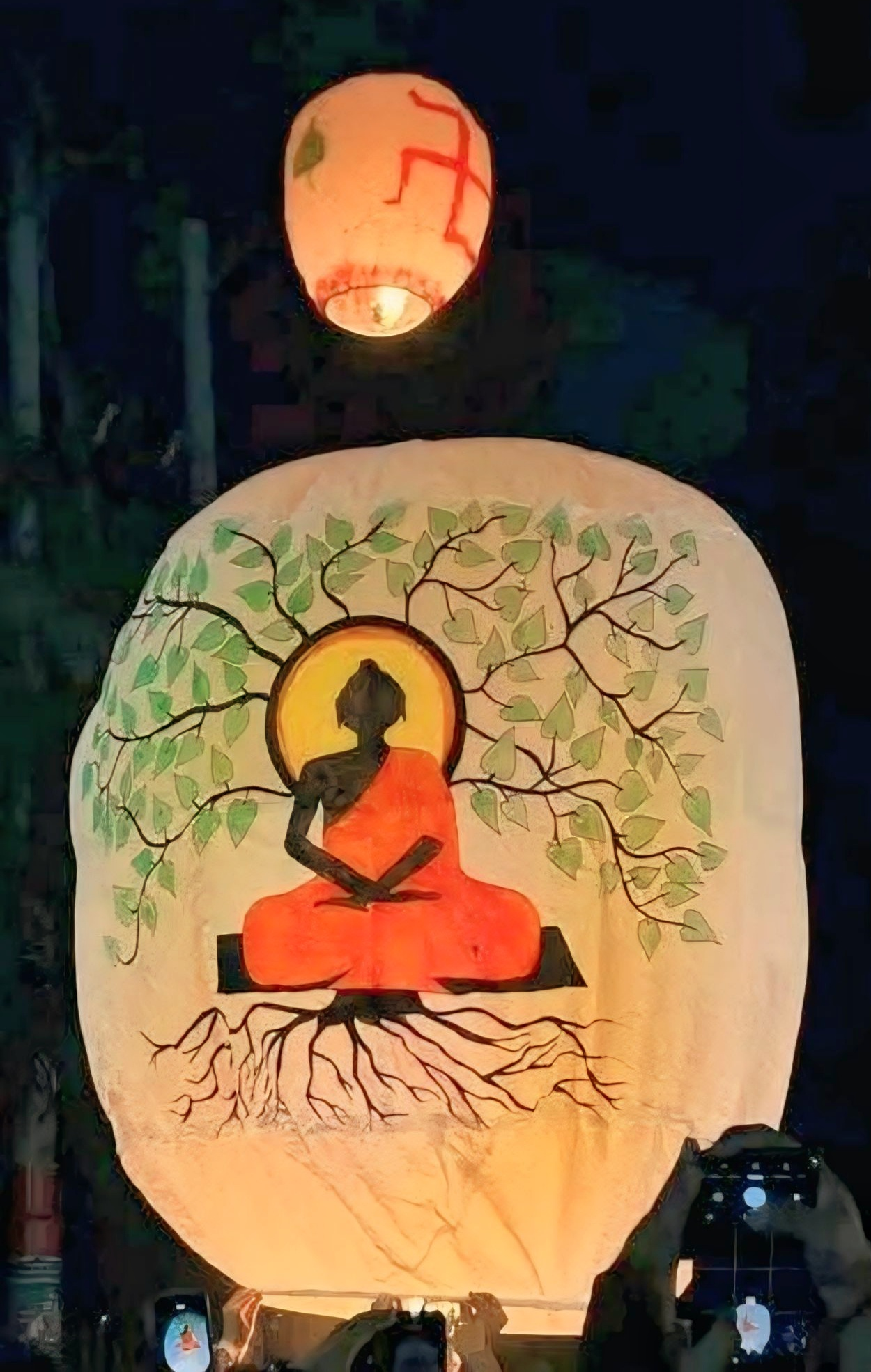
Art of Buddha in Sky lantern in Bangladesh

== See also ==
- Life of Buddha in art
- Anattalakkhaṇa Sutta
- Dhammacakkappavattana Sutta
- Iconography of Gautama Buddha in Laos and Thailand
- Knowing Buddha
- Leela Attitude
- Māravijaya Attitude
- Mahaparinibbana Sutta
- Meditation Attitude
- Naga Prok Attitude
- Relics associated with Buddha
- Samaññaphala Sutta
