= Wat Traimit =

Buddhist temple in Bangkok

Wat Traimit Witthayaram Worawihan
- วัดไตรมิตรวิทยารามวรวิหาร
- The temple complex in 2017 with the Phra Maha Mondop visible as the centerpiece

Religion
- Affiliation: Buddhism
- District: Samphanthawong
- Province: Bangkok

Location
- Country: Thailand
- Interactive map of Wat Traimit Witthayaram Worawihan
- Coordinates: 13°44′17″N 100°30′49″E

Wat Traimit Witthayaram Worawihan (Thai: วัดไตรมิตรวิทยารามวรวิหาร) is a Theravada Buddhist temple (wat) in Samphanthawong district, the Chinatown area of the Thai capital Bangkok. Probably dating to the early Rattanakosin period, it was previously known as Wat Sam Chin (วัดสามจีน) and received its current name in 1940. Today, the temple is best known for the golden Buddha statue enshrined there. It also houses the Yaowarat Chinatown Heritage Center.

== History ==
Wat Traimit was previously known as Wat Sam Chin or Wat Sam Chin Tai (วัดสามจีนใต้, 'south temple of the three Chinese'). According to oral histories, the temple was founded by three Chinese friends, hence its name. The temple was probably originally built around the reign of King Rama III (1824–1851), but was mostly rebuilt in the 1930s–1940s. It was renamed to Wat Traimit Witthayaram (traimit meaning 'three friends') on 3 February 1940, and became a royal temple of the second class in 1956.

== Phra Phuttha Maha Suwanna Patimakon (Golden Buddha) ==
A plaster-covered Buddha statue had been moved to the temple from the abandoned Wat Phraya Krai in 1935. In 1955, during a ceremony to relocate the statue to a newly built vihara, it was accidentally dropped, cracking the outer plaster and revealing a solid-gold image concealed within. The statue, officially named Phra Phuttha Maha Suwanna Patimakon since 1992, is now enshrined in the Mondop building, completed in 2007 and inaugurated in 2010.

== Architecture ==
Wat Traimit is a notable example of early post-absolute monarchy Thai Buddhist temple architecture. The monks' residences were built in 1937, and the ubosot (ordination hall) was built in 1947 in the applied Thai style to designs by Luang Wisansinlapakam. The ubosot and monks' quarter received the ASA Architectural Conservation Award in 2011.

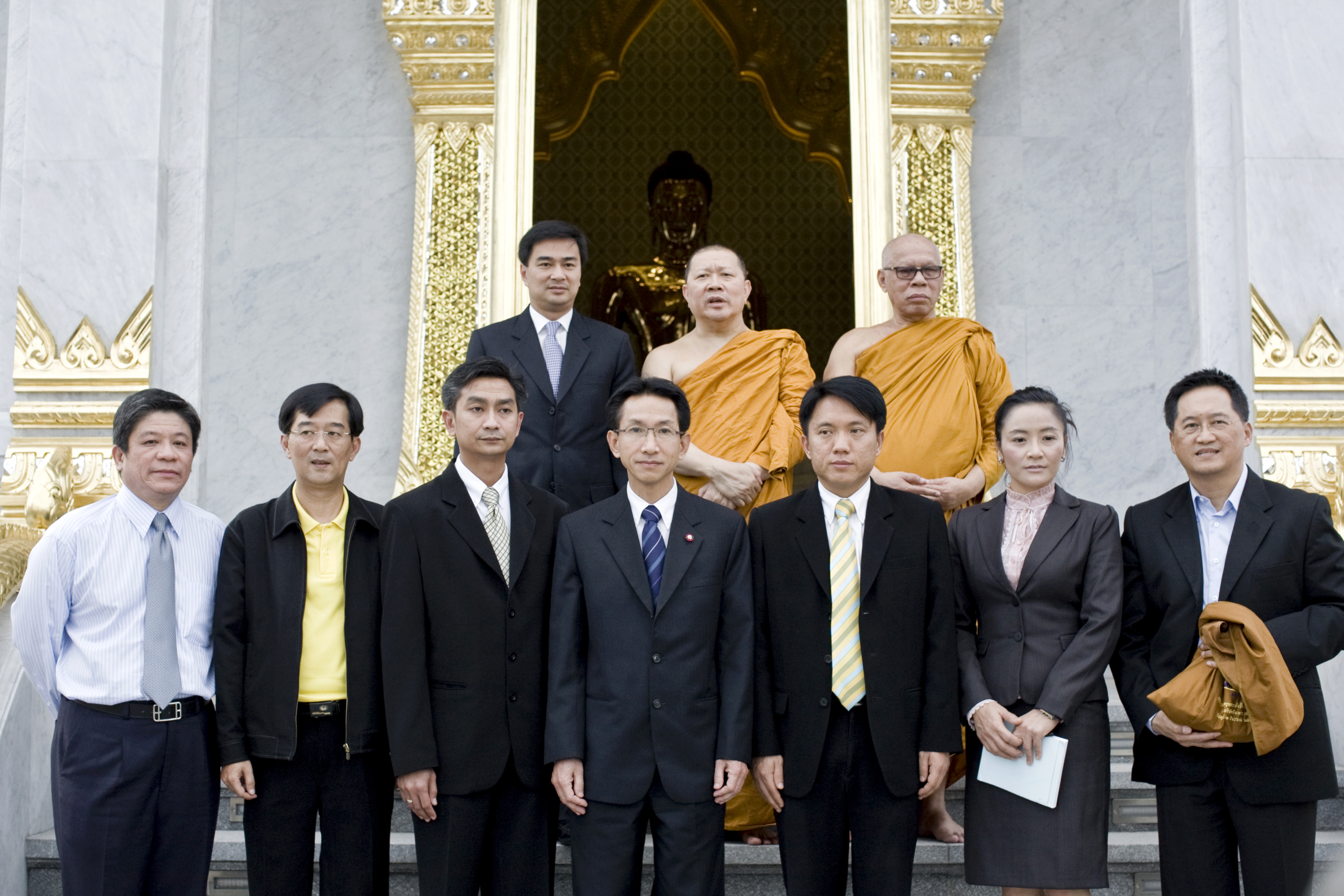
On 14 December 2009, the Cabinet visited Wat Traimit to inspect and ensure the proper progress of the Phra Maha Mondop construction project.

The Mondop building (officially known as the Phra Maha Mondop), designed by Arvuth Ngoenchuklin—a Thai architect noted for ceremonial state and royal religious works—is a four-storey, marble-clad pavilion in an applied Thai style that was purpose-built to enshrine the temple's solid-gold Buddha image (the Phra Phuttha Maha Suwanna Patimakon). Completed and opened to the public on 14 February 2010 as part of a state–community initiative that also commemorated King Bhumibol Adulyadej's 80th-birthday year in 2007, the building was intended to present the image in a national rather than purely local context, and to operate both as a devotional space and as an interpretive landmark for Bangkok's Chinatown.

The top floor is a formal shrine hall where the Golden Buddha is installed beneath an elaborately gilded multi-tiered roof and spired finial, and where visitors ascend to pay respect and view the surrounding Yaowarat area. The lower floors function as museums: one floor houses an exhibition on the statue itself—its Sukhothai-style casting, its centuries-long concealment beneath stucco, and its rediscovery in 1955—while another floor contains the Yaowarat Chinatown Heritage Center, which presents the social and economic history of Bangkok's Chinatown and the role of Chinese immigrants in the district from the early Rattanakosin period to the present.

=== Gallery ===
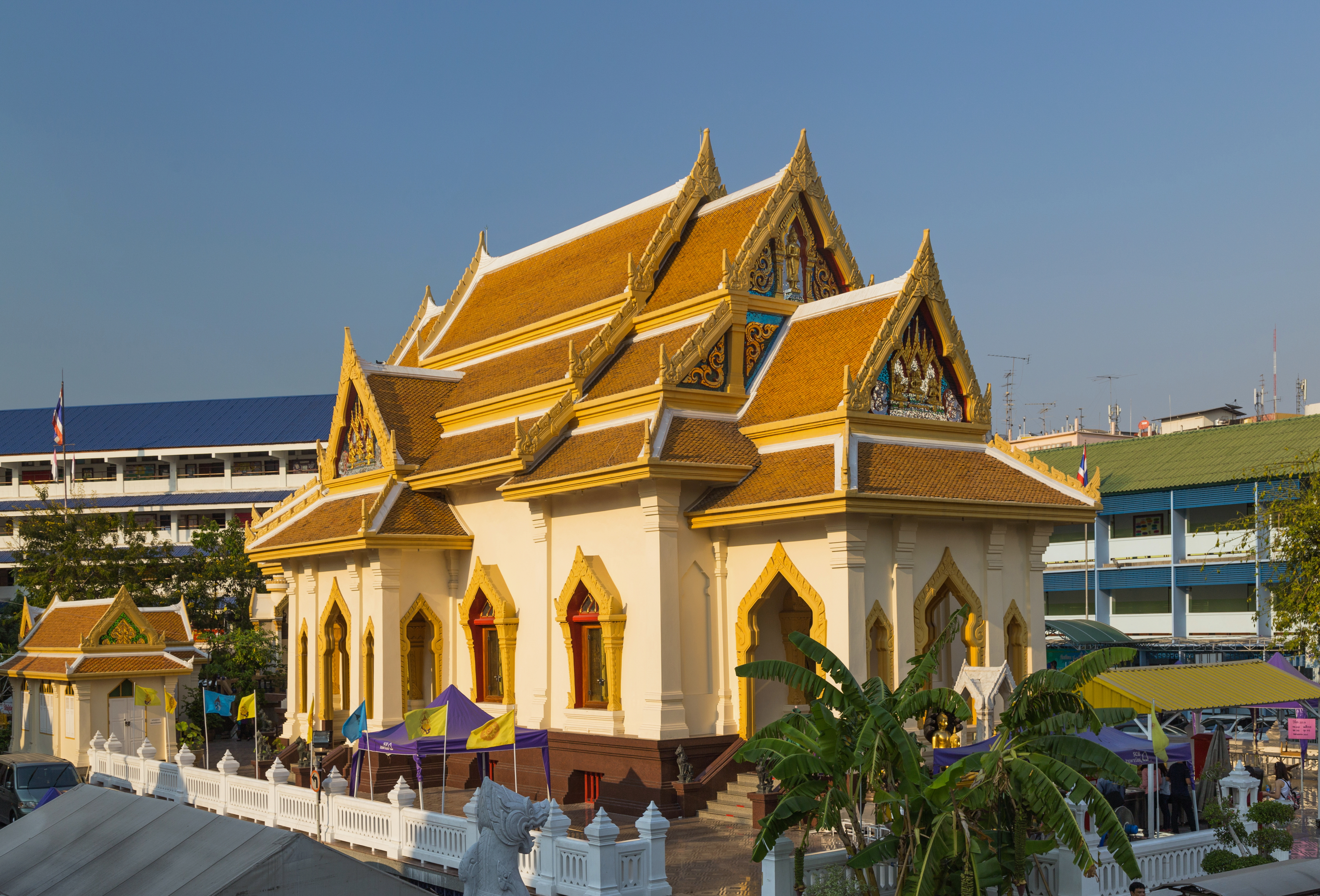
The ubosot

The front view of the Phra Maha Mondop, with a royal portrait display of King Bhumibol placed in front of the main staircase.

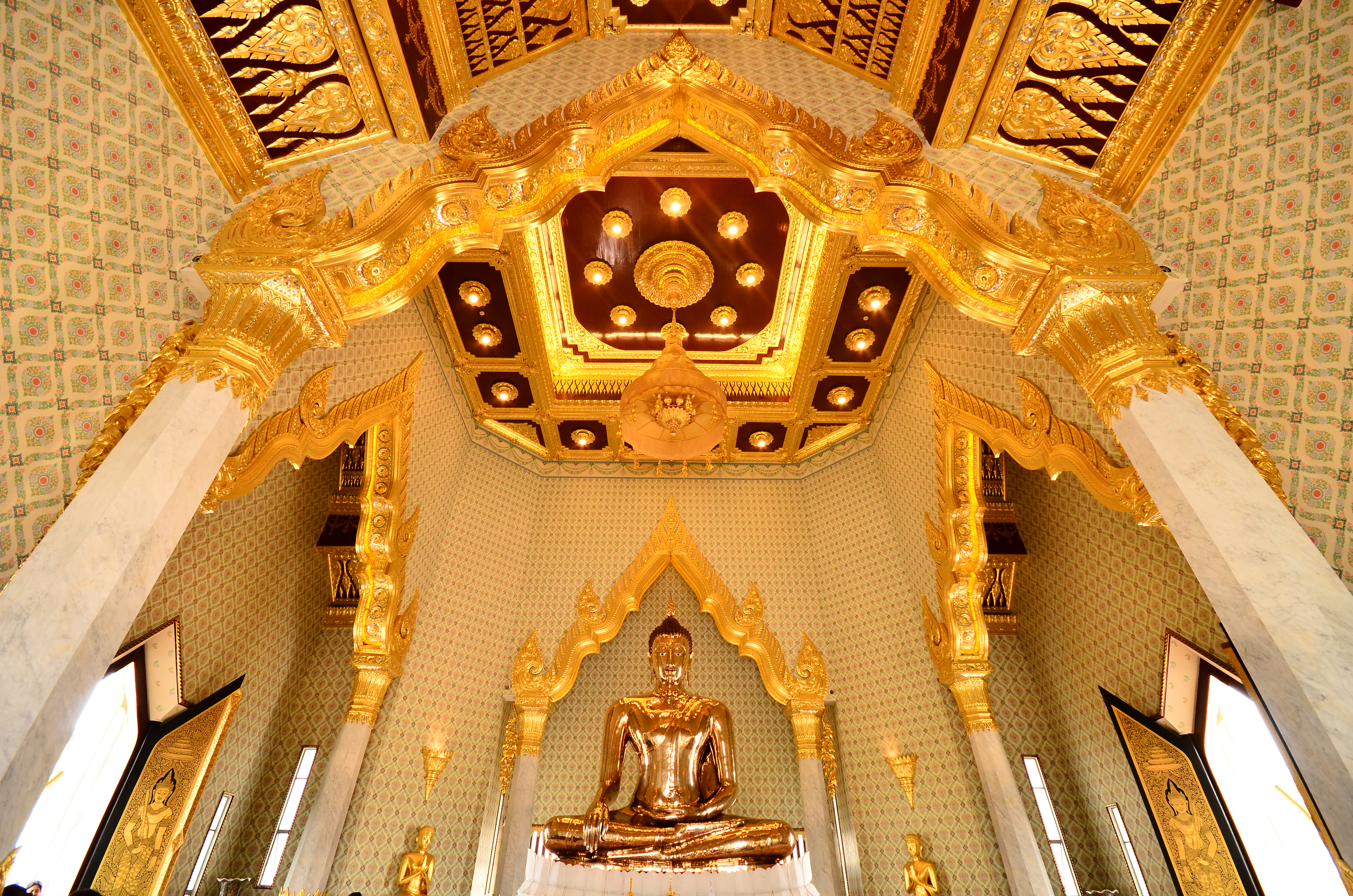
Interior of the Phra Maha Mondop, showing the Golden Buddha.
