= Chang Phueak Monument =

Historical monument in Chiang Mai, Thailand

- ᩋᨶᩩᩈᩣᩅᩁᩦ᩠ᨿ᩺ᩮᨹᩥᩬᨠ (Northern Thai); อนุสาวรีย์ช้างเผือก (Thai)
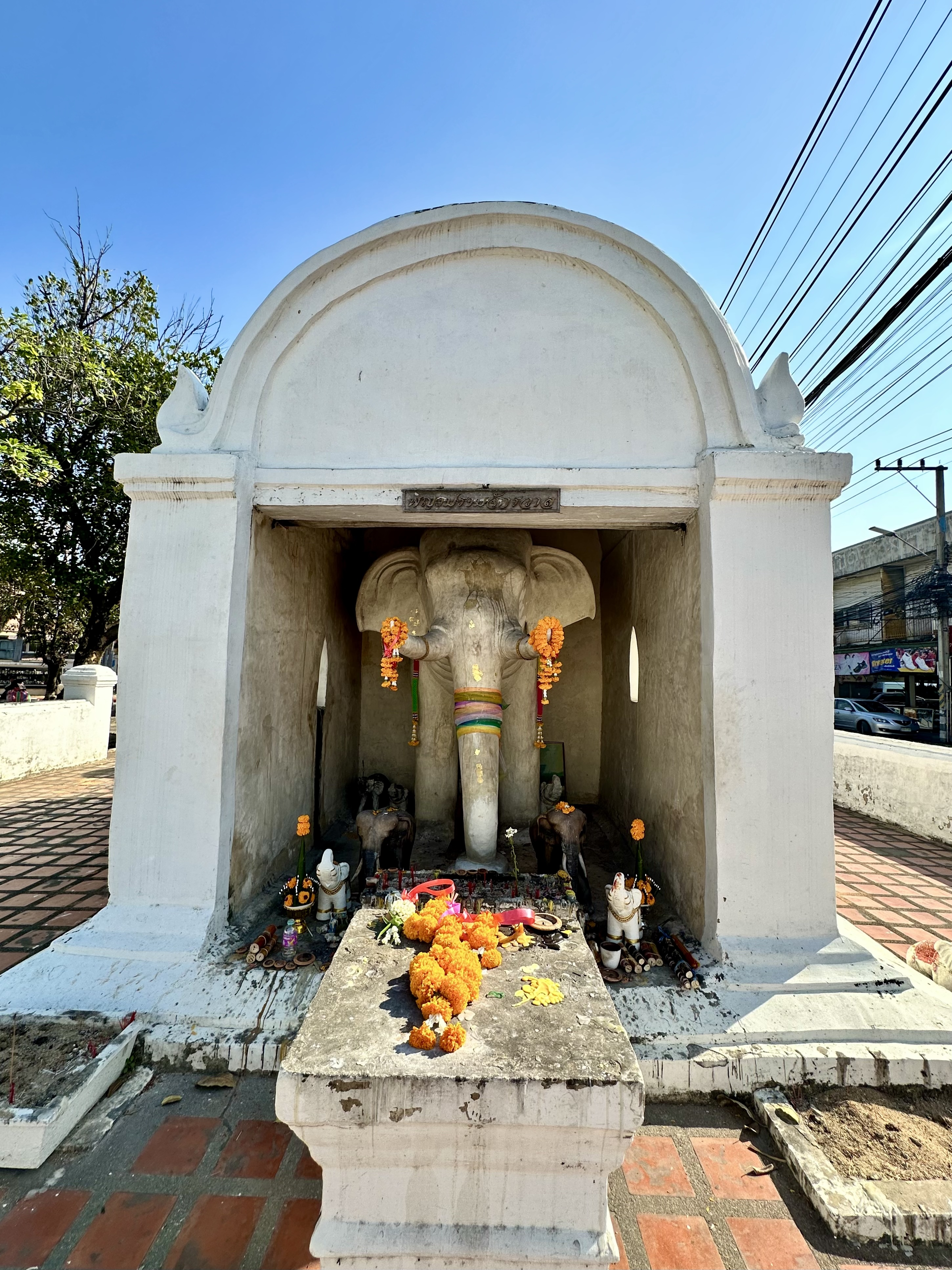
- One of the white elephant statues in 2024
- Interactive map of Chang Phueak Monument
- 18.800544°N 98.986080°E
- Location: Chang Phueak, Mueang Chiang Mai district, Chiang Mai province, Thailand

History
- Built: During the reign of Saenmueangma, according to local chronicles
- Rebuilt: 1800

Chang Phueak Monument (Northern Thai: ᩋᨶᩩᩈᩣᩅᩁᩦ᩠ᨿ᩺ᩮᨹᩥᩬᨠ; Thai: อนุสาวรีย์ช้างเผือก), also known as the White Elephant Monument, is a historical monument consisting of two white elephant statues in Chiang Mai, Thailand. It stands north of the old city wall, near Chang Phueak Gate and the Chang Phueak bus terminal. The statues are linked to the history of the Lanna Kingdom and are regarded by some local people as guardian spirits of the city.

== History ==
=== First construction ===
According to the Chiang Mai Chronicle, the first white elephant statues were built during the reign of Saenmueangma, the seventh ruler of the Mangrai dynasty, who reigned from 1388 to 1411. The chronicle tells of a conflict involving the rulers of Sukhothai and Ayutthaya. The ruler of Sukhothai asked Saenmueangma for military assistance, and Saenmueangma led an army south to help him. However, the Sukhothai army attacked the Chiang Mai forces at night, causing them to retreat.

Saenmueangma became separated from his army and fled towards Thap Salit. He met two men named Ai Ob (อ้ายออบ) and Ai Yira (อ้ายยี่ระ), who took turns carrying him back to Chiang Mai. As a reward, he appointed them to military positions on the left and right sides of the royal elephant forces and allowed them to settle south of Chiang Chom. Two white elephant statues were then built near their settlement, with a passage between them. The statues commemorated the two men's service to the king.

During the reign of Tilokaraj, the king ordered Muen Dam Phrakhot to build two new white elephant statues and two lion statues in the northern part of Chiang Mai. This followed his work on the great stupa at Wat Chedi Luang, where eight elephant statues were also placed around the base. According to the Tamnan Chiang Mai Pang Doem, sacred formulas were recited and placed within the elephant and lion statues. These later statues were intended to protect the city.

=== Rebuilding under Kawila ===
In 1800 (BE 2343), Kawila, ruler of Chiang Mai, ordered the two white elephant statues to be rebuilt because they had deteriorated. The new statues were close to the size of real elephants. Arched structures were built over them, along with walls and entrances around the site. Both the elephants and the surrounding walls were painted white.

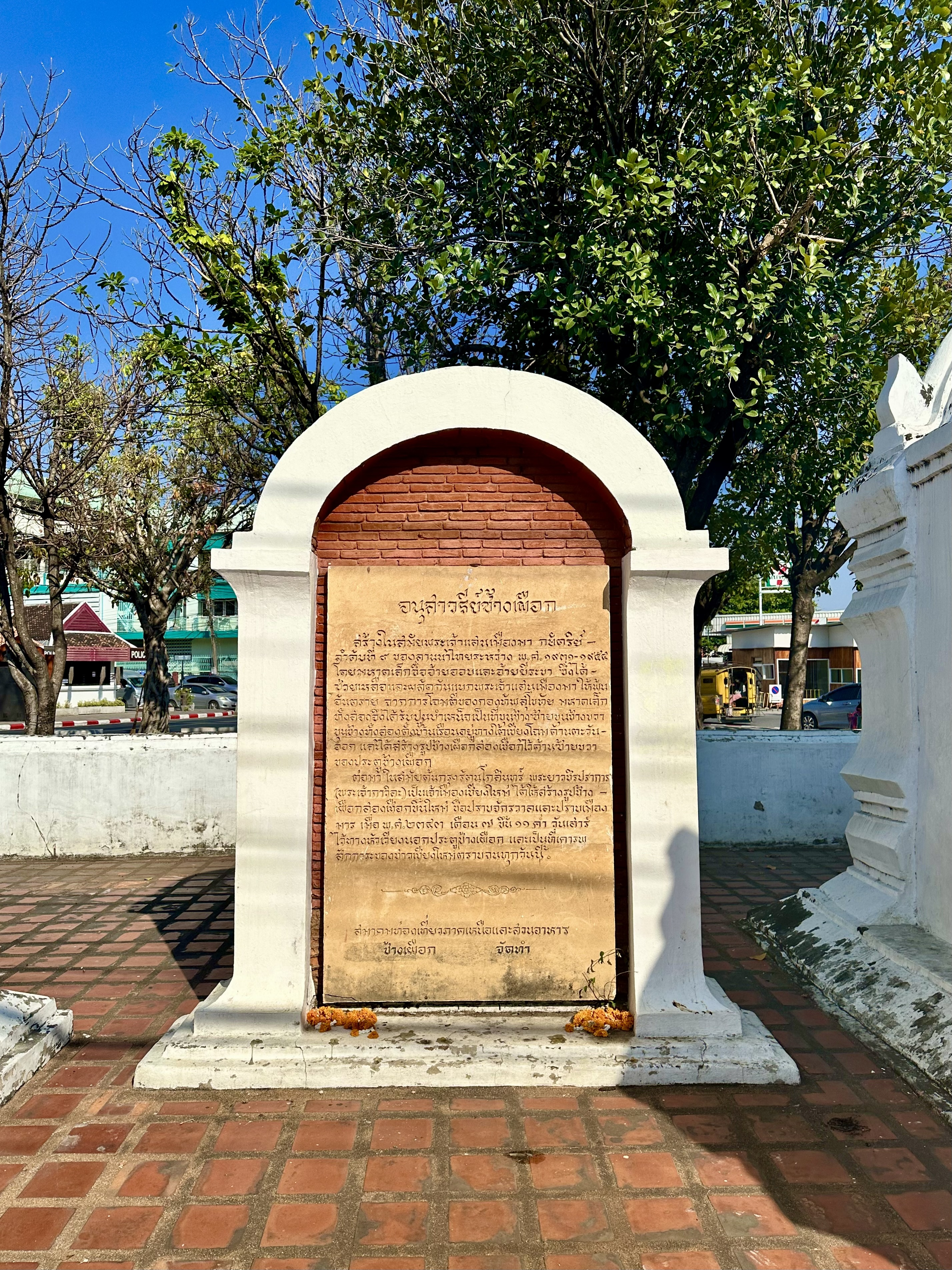
Inscription at the Chang Phueak Monument

The statues are named Phraya Prap Jakkawan (พระยาปราบจักรวาล, "Lord Who Conquers the Universe") and Phraya Prap Muang Mar Muang Yak (พระยาปราบเมืองมารเมืองยักษ์, "Lord Who Conquers the Cities of Demons and Giants"). The Fine Arts Department, citing the Chiang Mai Chronicle, states that Prap Jakkawan faces north and Prap Muang Mar Muang Yak faces west. Another account records them as facing east and north, respectively.

The northern gate of Chiang Mai was formerly called Hua Wiang Gate (ประตูหัวเวียง). It later became known as Chang Phueak Gate because of the white elephant statues near it.

== Religious traditions ==
The two white elephants are regarded by some Chiang Mai residents as guardian spirits of the city, known locally as Chao Pho Chang Phueak (เจ้าพ่อช้างเผือก). According to the Tamnan Chiang Mai Pang Doem, when King Setthathirath of Lan Xang ruled Chiang Mai, he tried to overcome the elephants' protective powers through rituals performed by elephant handlers. The attempts failed, and the elephants were believed to have protected the city.

Local residents make offerings to the white elephant statues. A traditional ceremony to honour them is held during May or June, when people from the surrounding community bring offerings to the monument.

== Damage and restoration ==
The monument has undergone repairs over time. In early 2023, a vehicle struck its surrounding wall, causing damage. The Fine Arts Department stated that repairs were delayed while compensation from the vehicle's insurance was being arranged.

In June 2023, Chiang Mai governor Nirat Pongsitthithavorn inspected the monument. Both elephants had damaged tusks, while Phraya Prap Muang Mar Muang Yak was also leaning because of structural deterioration. Parts of the plaster and paint had deteriorated, and the wall had been damaged by the vehicle collision. The governor ordered the Fine Arts Office No. 7 to carry out repairs.

On 11 February 2024, police detained a man suspected of writing offensive messages on the monument with a marker pen. The man was taken to the monument to perform a ceremony asking forgiveness before further legal proceedings.
