= Great Buddha =

Great Buddha, Big Buddha, or Giant Buddha may refer to:

== China ==
- Leshan Giant Buddha in Leshan, Sichuan
- Rongxian Giant Buddha in Rongxian, Sichuan
- Grand Buddha at Ling Shan, in Wuxi, Jiangsu
- Tian Tan Buddha, or "Big Buddha", Ngong Ping, Lantau Island, Hong Kong
- Spring Temple Buddha, Lushan County, Henan

== Japan ==
- Daibutsu (the Great Buddha), name given to several large Buddha statues in Japan
  - Gifu Great Buddha, Shōhō-ji in Gifu Prefecture
  - Kamagaya Great Buddha, Kamagaya, Chiba Prefecture
  - Daibutsu (Great Buddha) at Kōtoku-in, Kamakura, Kanagawa Prefecture
  - Great Buddha at Takaoka, Toyama Prefecture
  - Great Buddha at Tōdai-ji, Nara Prefecture
  - Ushiku Daibutsu in Ushiku, Ibaraki Prefecture, Japan

== Thailand ==
- Wat Pho, the Temple of the Reclining Buddha, Bangkok
- Great Buddha of Thailand, Wat Muang Monastery, Ang Thong province (The tallest statue in Thailand)
- Luangpho Yai Great Buddha, Roi Et (2nd-tallest)
- Big Buddha Temple, Ko Phan, Ko Samui
- Wat Intharavihan, home to the tallest statue in Bangkok, Luang Pho To
- Tiger Cave Temple, overlooking Krabi

== Others ==
- Buddha of Ibiraçu, Brazil
- Buddhas of Bamyan in Bamyan, Afghanistan
- Great Buddha (Bodh Gaya), India
- The Great Buddha (painting), an 1899 painting by Paul Gauguin
- Laykyun Sekkya, Myanmar

== Films ==
- The Great Buddha+, a 2017 black comedy submitted to the 91st Academy Awards for Best Foreign Language Film
