= Maravijaya attitude =

Attitude of Buddha in Thai art

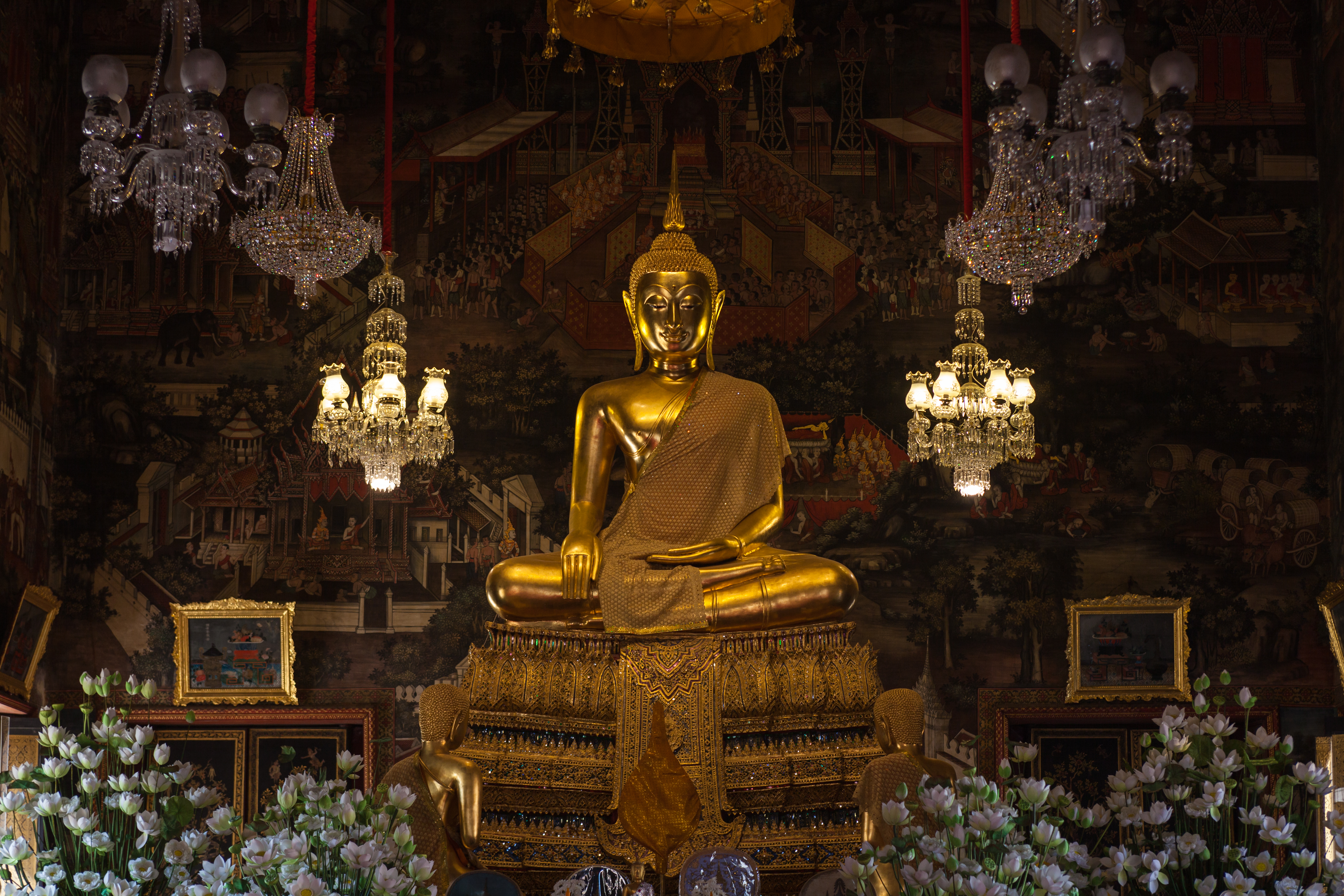
The seated Māravijaya Buddha in the ubosot of Wat Arun, Bangkok

Māravijaya attitude is an attitude of Buddha in Thai art in which the seated Buddha is putting his hand in the relax posture towards the ground, loosely holding his knee. The other hand is on his lap. His eyes, sometimes closed, look down to the ground. The gesture of the hand reaching the ground is called bhumisparshamudra, which also refers to the attitude as well. The gesture refers to the episode which the Buddha calls the earth to witness.

The attitude refers to the episode that he was reaching the enlightenment and being disturbed by maras. Learning that the maras asked him to give up, he touched the ground and called the Phra Mae Thorani to help him fight with the maras. Thoranee called tonnes of water and flooded away the maras. The episode results in the name Mara Vichai which means the "Victory (vichai) over the Mara".

The Dakkhinasakha style of the Buddha in Burmese art features the Buddha in the Māravijaya attitude.

== Names ==
The iconography is known by various names throughout Southeast Asia.

In Burmese art, the attitude is called the bhūmiphassa mudrā (Burmese: ဘူမိဖဿမုဒြာ).

In Khmer art, this attitude of the Buddha is called preah pud (buddha) p'chanh mea (Khmer: ព្រះពុទ្ធផ្ចាញ់មារ), which means "the sacred Buddha defeating the enemy (Māra)".

In Thai art, this attitude is variously called māra vichai (Thai: ปางมารวิชัย, RTGS: pang marawichai), chana Māra (ชนะมาร; "victory over Māra"), and sadung Māra (สะดุ้งมาร; "striking fear into Māra").

== Notable examples ==
As mentioned, the Māravijaya Buddha is the most commonly-built Buddha, some of the notable Buddharupas in Thailand that are built depicting the Māravijaya are:

- Great Buddha of Thailand
- Phuket Big Buddha
- Golden Buddha of Wat Traimit
- Phra Achana in Sukhothai Historical Park
- Māravijaya Buddha (Burmese: မာရဝိဇယဗုဒ္ဓရုပ်ပွားတော်) is an 81 feet (25 m) marble statue of the Buddha in Dekkhinathiri Township, Naypyidaw, the national capital of Myanmar.

== Gallery ==
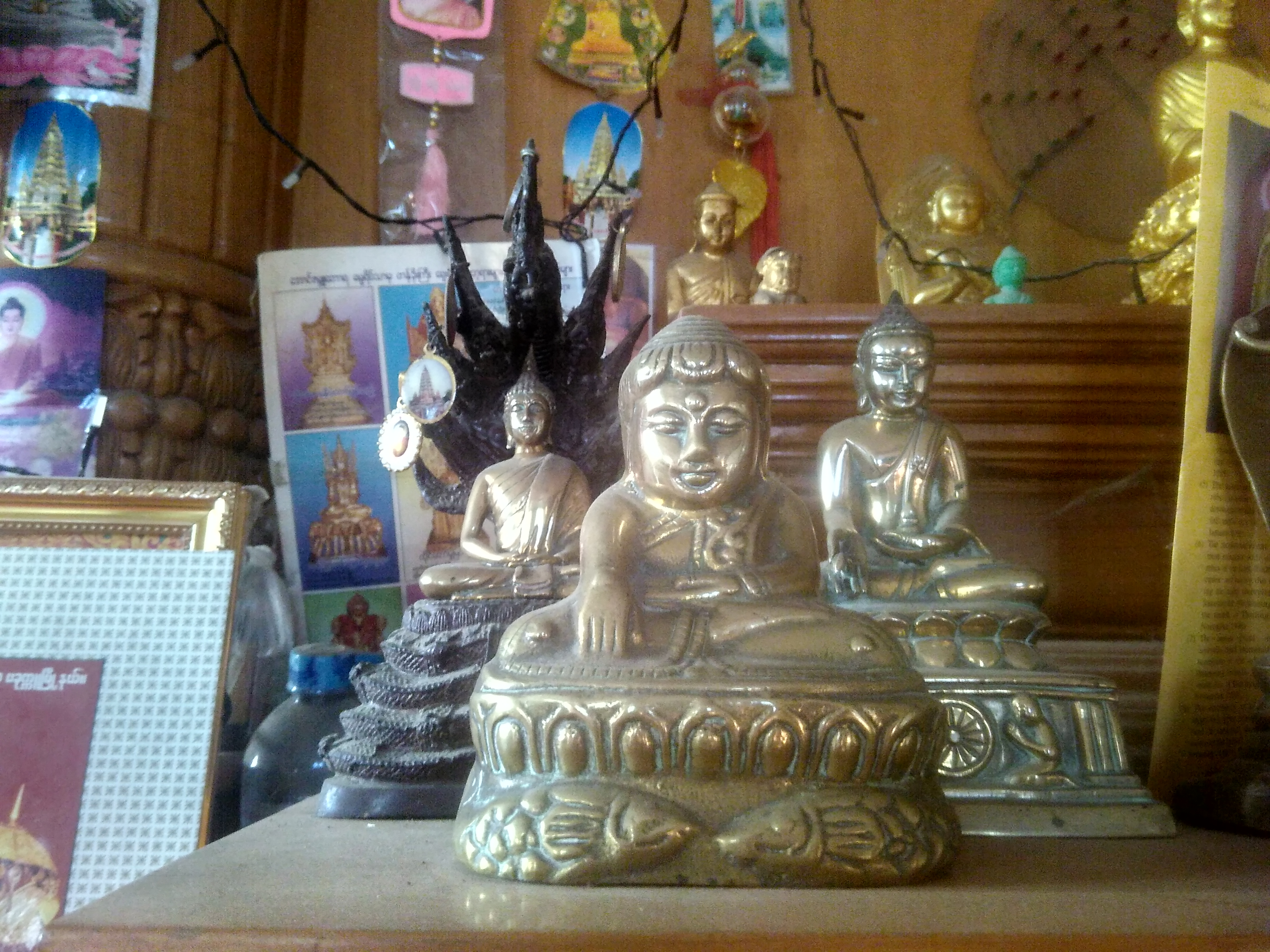
A Dakkhiṇasākhā statue of the Buddha

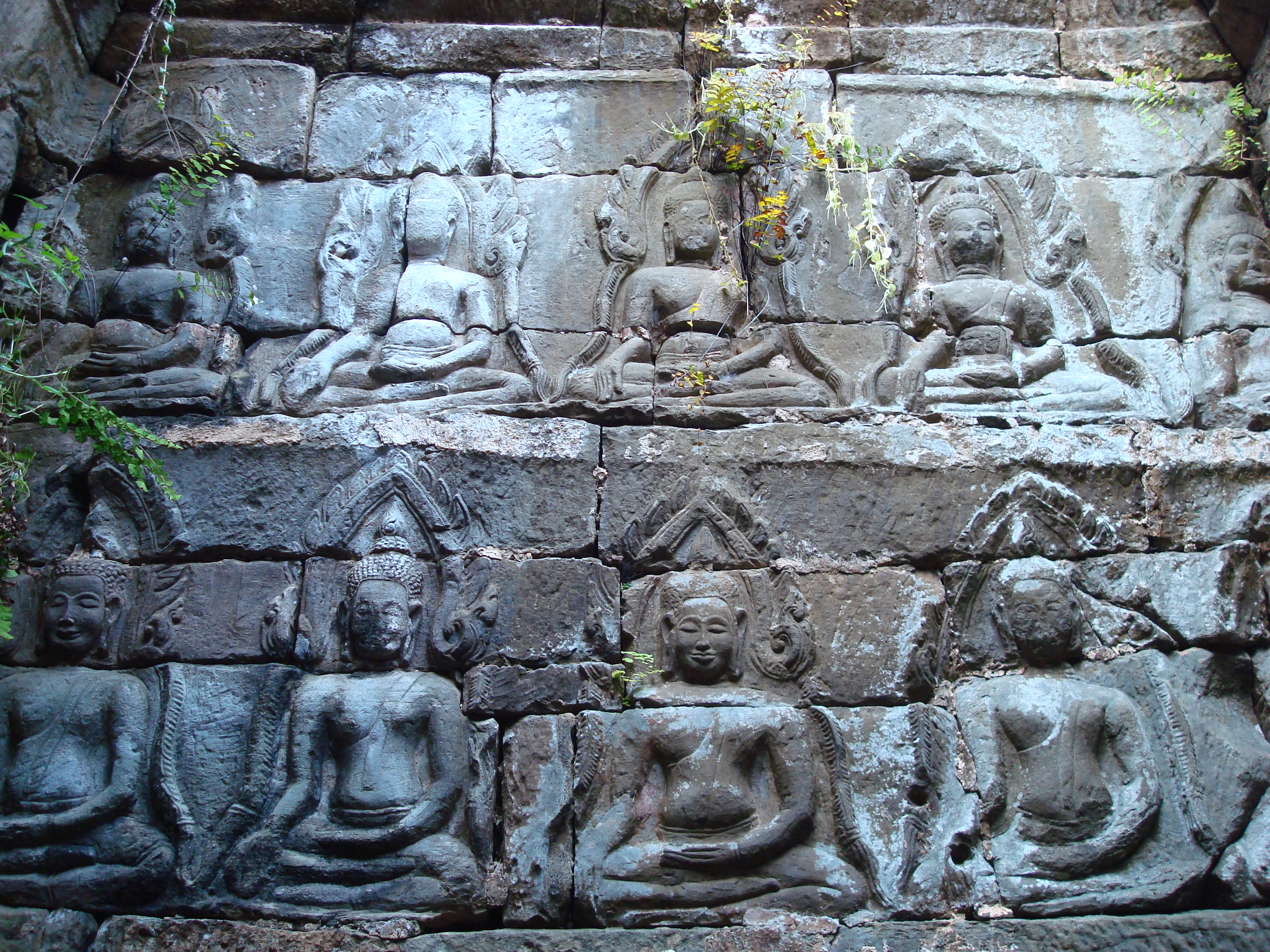
Double row of sculpted Buddhas in sanctuary chamber of temple "X" of Preah Pithu, Angkor, Cambodia.

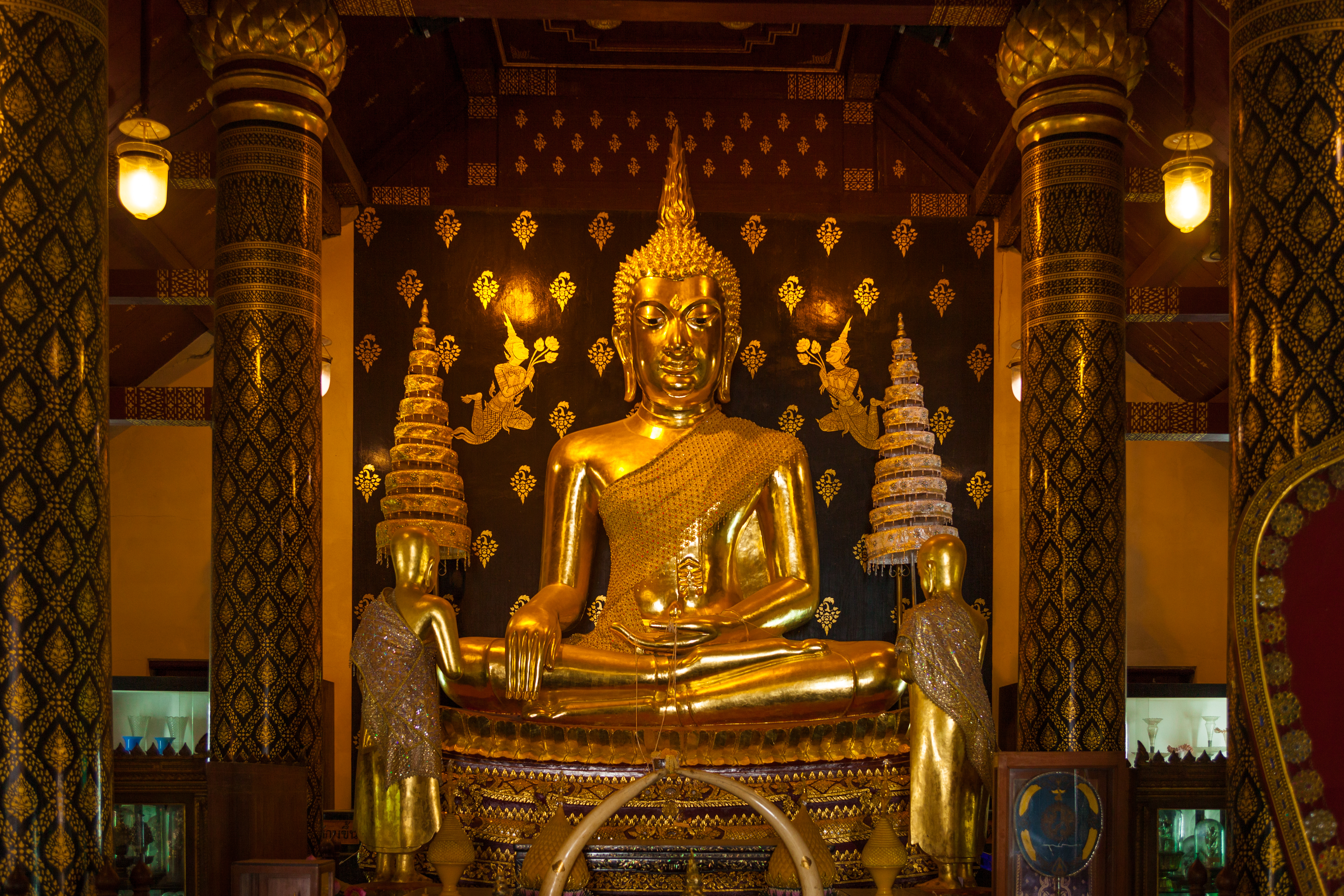
in Phitsanulok

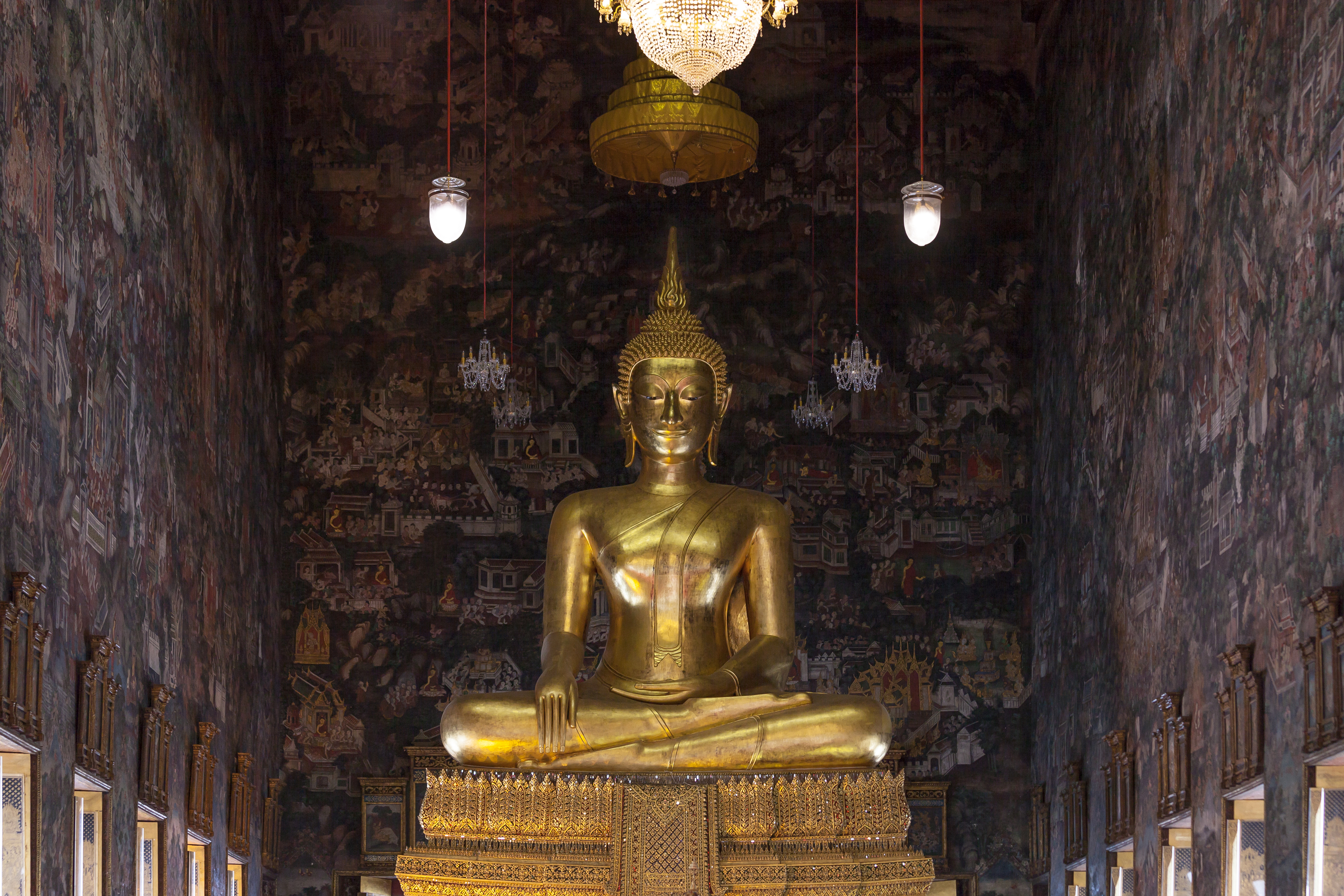
at Wat Suthat, Bangkok

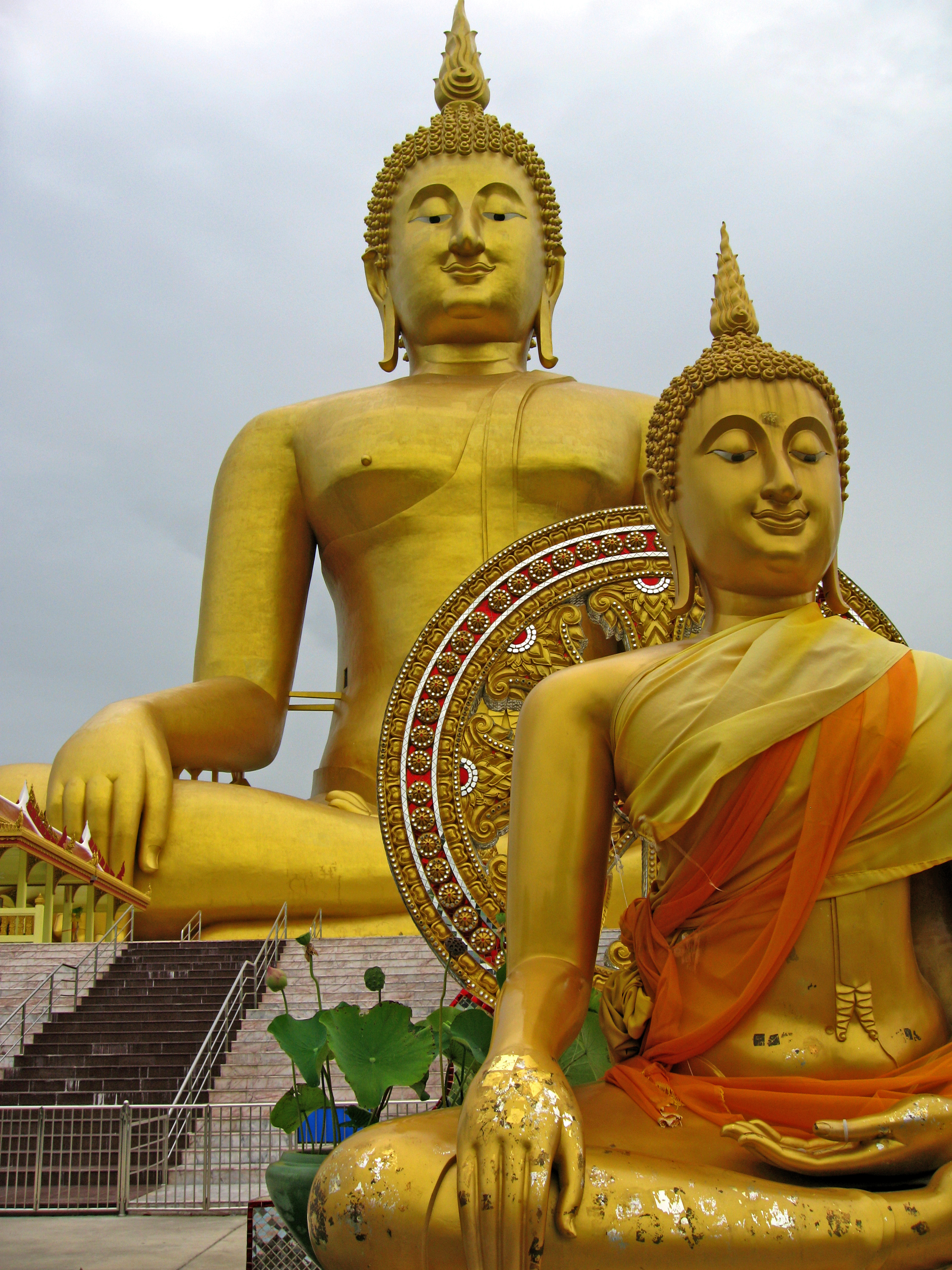
Great Buddha of Thailand

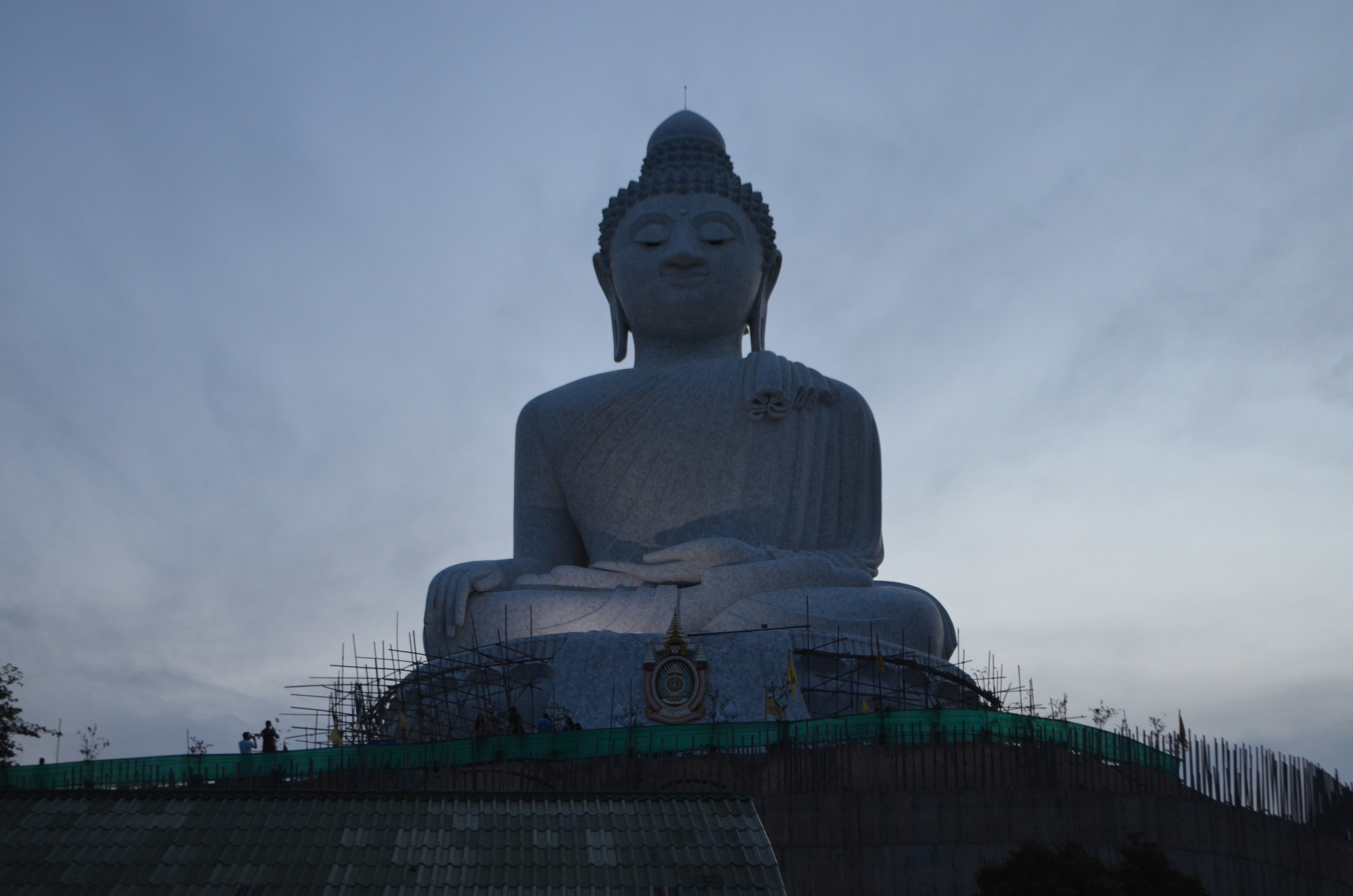
Phuket Big Buddha

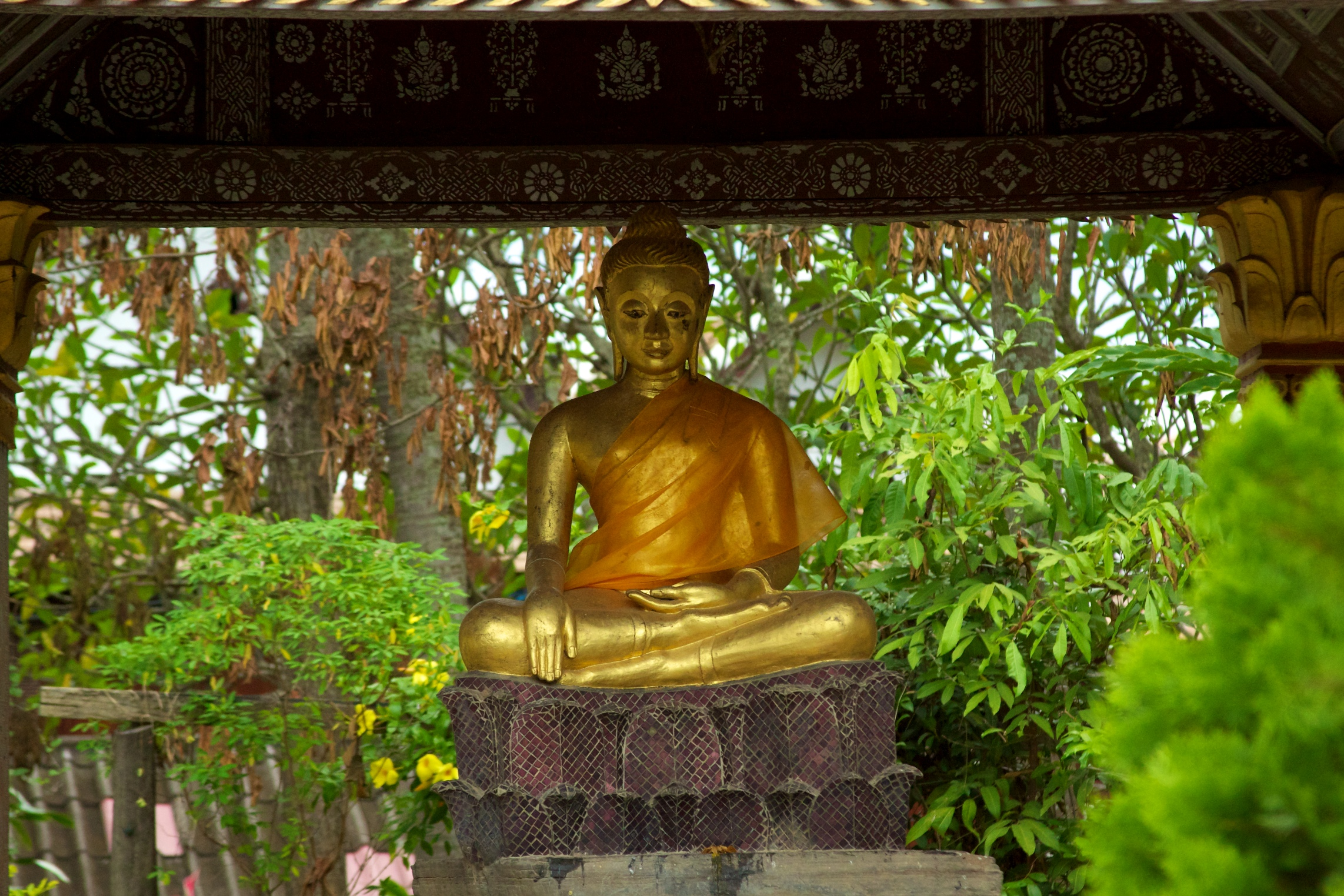
at Wat Xieng Thong, Luang Prabang, Laos

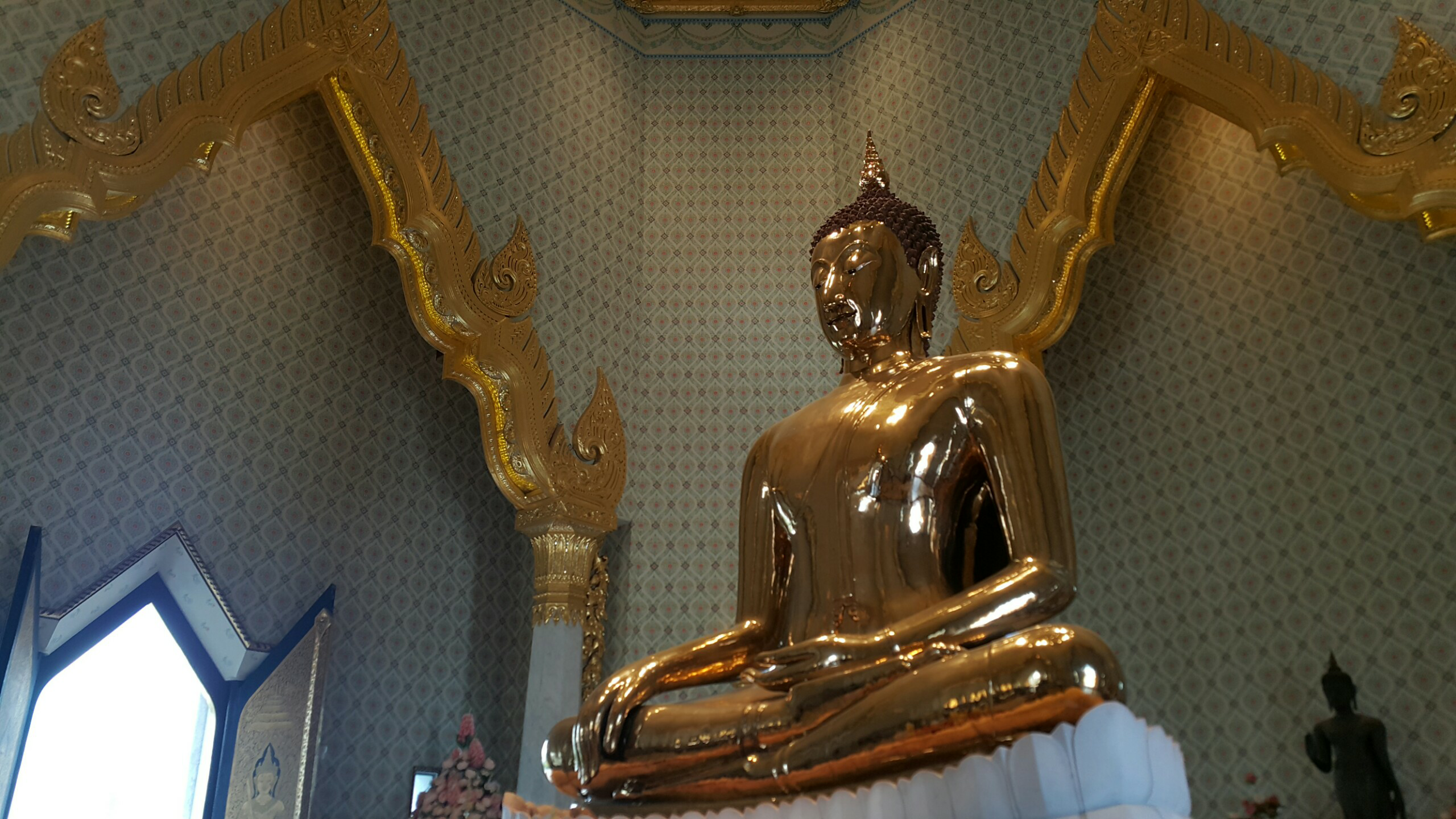
Golden Buddha of Wat Traimit

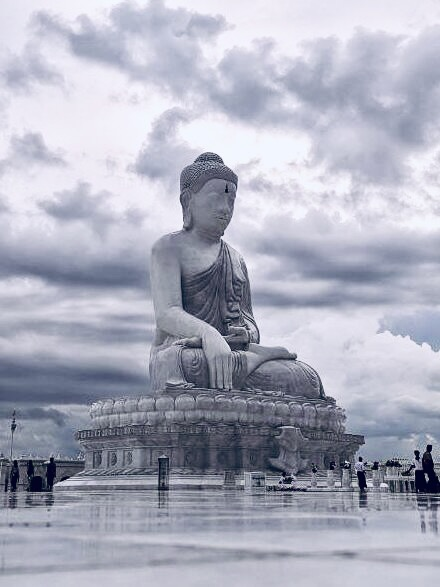
Māravijaya Buddha, Myanmar
