= Wat Intharawihan =

Temple in Phra Nakhon district, Bangkok

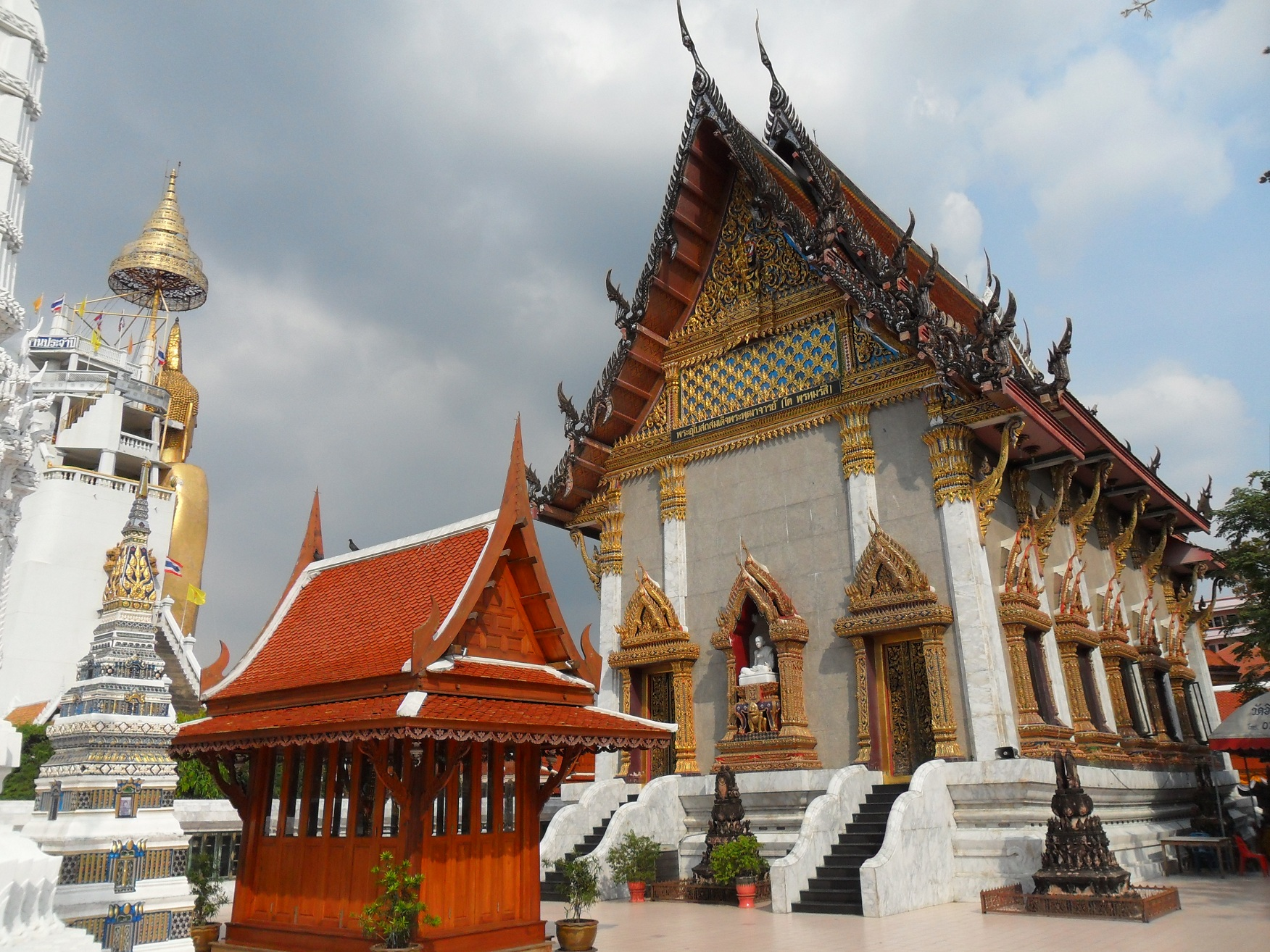
- Wat Intharawihan with statue of Buddha to its right

- Location within Bangkok

Religion
- Affiliation: Buddhism

Location
- Country: Thailand
- Interactive map of Wat Intharawihan
- Coordinates: 13.76697°N 100.502715°E

Wat Intharawihan or Wat Intharavihan (Thai: วัดอินทรวิหาร, Thai pronunciation: [wát intʰaráwíhǎːn]) is a Third Class Royal wat (temple) located in the Phra Nakhon District of Bangkok, Thailand. It is noted for its 32 metres (105 ft) high standing Buddha statue known as Luang Pho To or "Phra Si Ariyamettrai" that was erected on the inspiration of the still highly revered abbott Somdej Toh.

== Location ==
The Wat is at the northern edge of the Banglamphu area of Phra Nakhon, Bangkok. Access to the temple is by boat along the Chao Praya River close to Wisut Kasat Road. Road access is through local transport. The northbound Samsen Road leads to this wat, which is hidden below the elevated expressway. Also called Wat In, of the late Ayutthaya Kingdom, when it was called Wat Bang Khunphrom Nok for the name of the suburb where it is located.

== History ==
The Wat is a royal temple categorized as Class III, which was built at the beginning of the Ayutthaya Kingdom, and was originally called Wat Rai Phrik "Vegetable fields Wat". It was so named as it was surrounded by vegetable gardens. The land where the temple is situated was provided by Rama I to accommodate prisoners of war. During the reign of King Vajiravudh it was refurbished by Chao Inthawong, whereafter it was known as Wat Intharavihan. Chao Inthawong also brought a priest from Vientiane to preside as the abbot of the temple.

== Luang Pho To Buddha statue ==
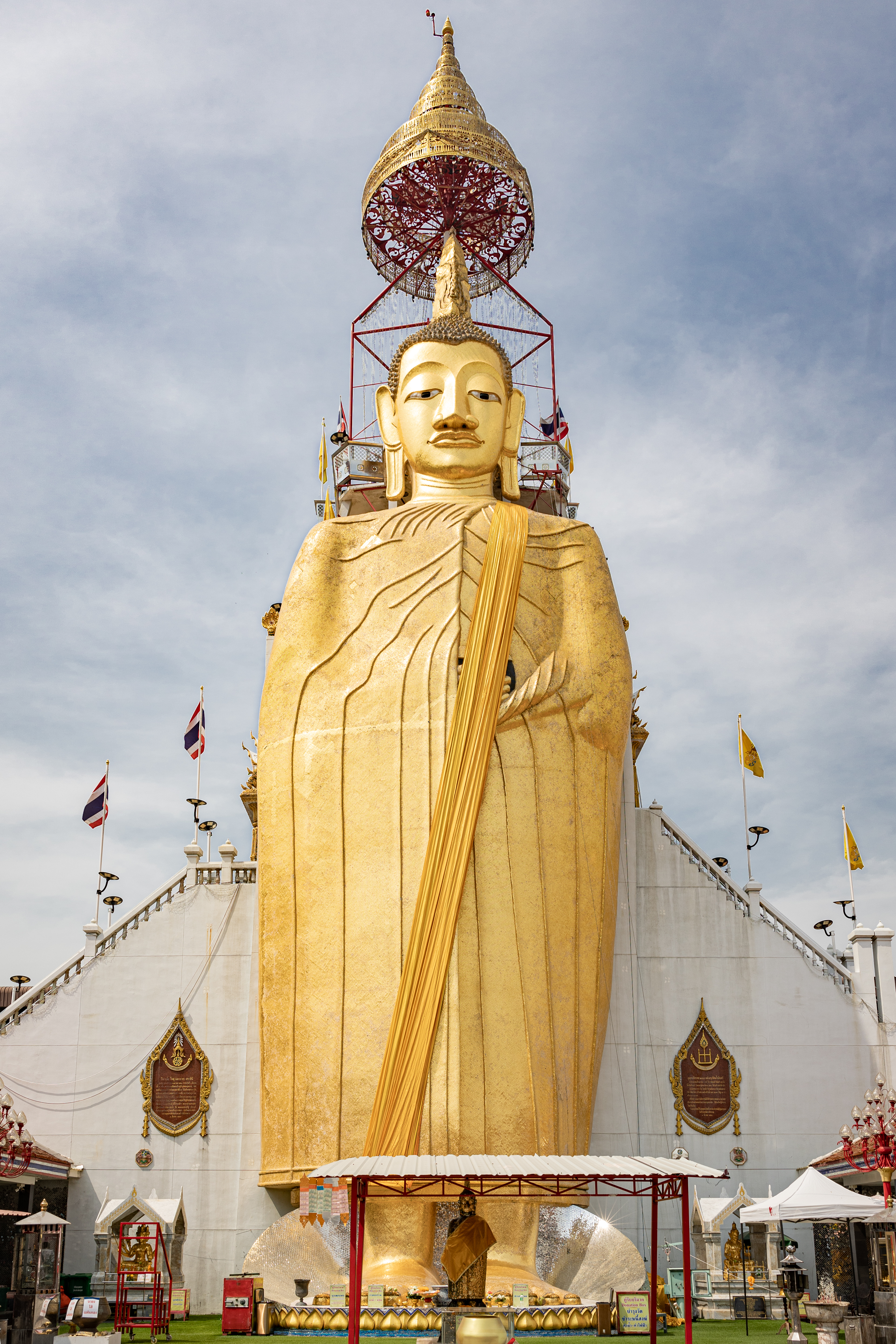
The standing Buddha.

The Wat's main architectural depiction is a 32 metres (105 ft) high, 10 metres (33 ft) wide standing statue referred to as Luang Pho To or "Phra Si Ariyamettrai" (Maitreya). Building the Buddha statue was started in 1867 and it took sixty more years to complete it in 1927. The image is made of brick and stucco. Somdej Toh, the then Abbott of the temple was the inspiration to build it. He died at the foot of the image in 1871 when it was being built. A gilded bust of this abbot is enshrined at the temple entrance. The Buddha image is carrying bowl and stairways at the sides to the back behind the statue provides access for devotees to paste gold leaf on the statue. The image is called Luang Phor To. In 1982 during 200th anniversary of the establishment of Bangkok city the image was refurbished and fitted with Italian golden mosaic tile. The statue which is decorated in glass mosaics tiles is gilded with 24-carat gold. The topknot, called ushnisha, of the Buddha statue contains a relic of Gautama Buddha that was given as a gift by the Government of Sri Lanka. The enshrinement of the relic in the ushnisha was done by Prince Vajiralongkorn, the knot was placed in 1978.

== Features ==
=== Temple ===
The temple has an ordination hall called the Ubosot (prayer hall) also known linguistically as Bod. Its architecture reflects the style followed during the Ayutthaya Kingdom. It was refurbished in 1982. Italian marble is used to decorate the lower part of the hall and the walls are decorated with traditional paintings. The sema boundary posts marking the limits of the Ubosot are mounted over small naga images. The murals on the walls have the theme of the daily life. There is also a practice at this venue to make and sell amulets.

An image of Phra Puttahachan, who was an abbot in the temple is enshrined in a separate newly constructed chamber in the temple. The image is made of wax and is placed over a spring of water. Water collected from various regions of Thailand is preserved in containers placed in the shelves in the chamber. Air conditioning is provided to preserve the wax image. The same is dimly lighted and devotees do meditation here as it has a special ambiance.

=== Guanyin shrine ===
There is another shrine here dedicated to Guanyin, a female form of Avalokiteśvara, a bodhisattva of Mahayana Buddhism.

=== Worship ===
Devotees who visit the temple for worship offer mackerel, a boiled egg and a garland of flowers which they place with reverence at the foot of the Buddha image.

== Gallery ==
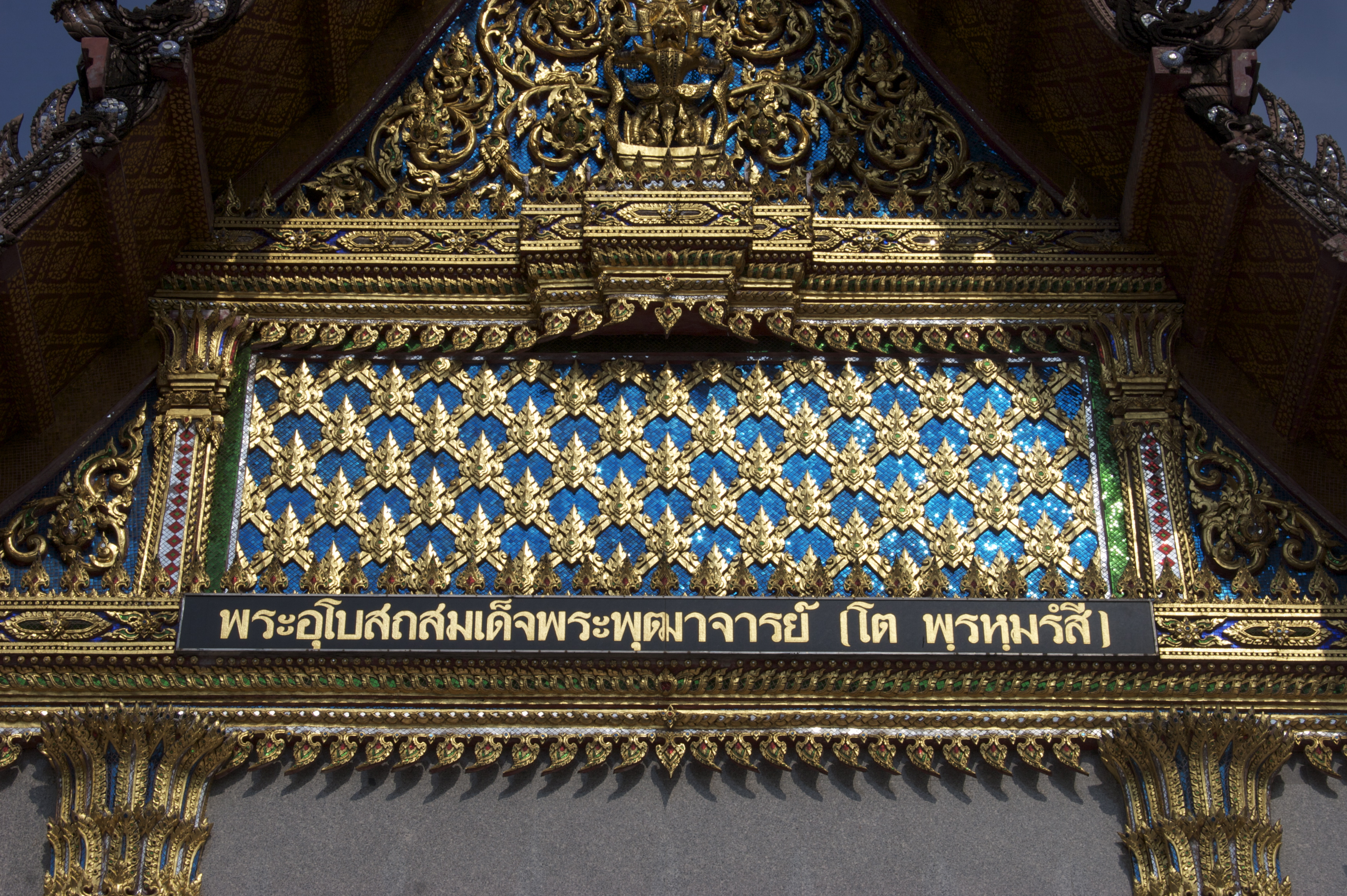
Detail on the front of the wat

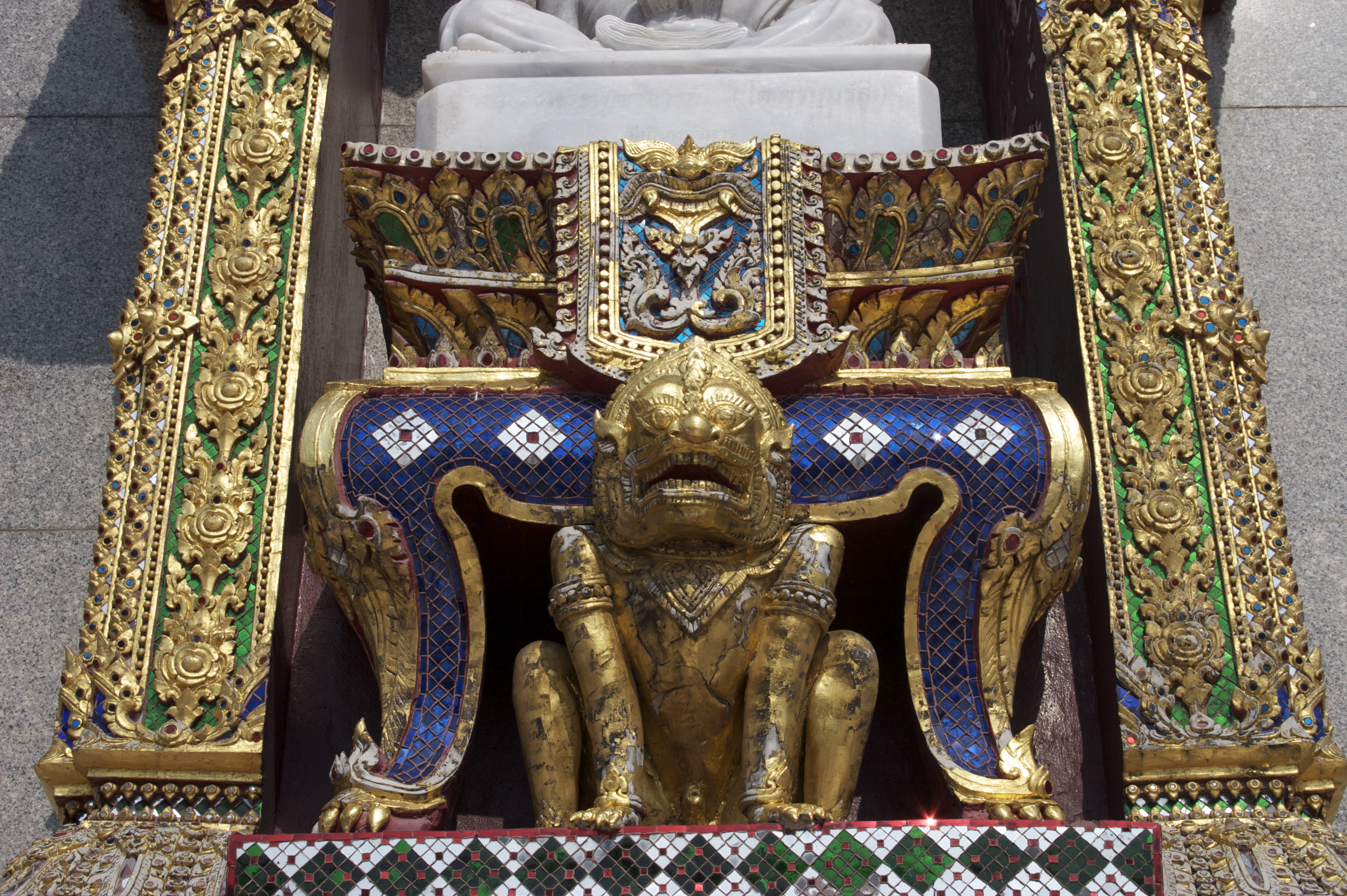
An ornamental statue

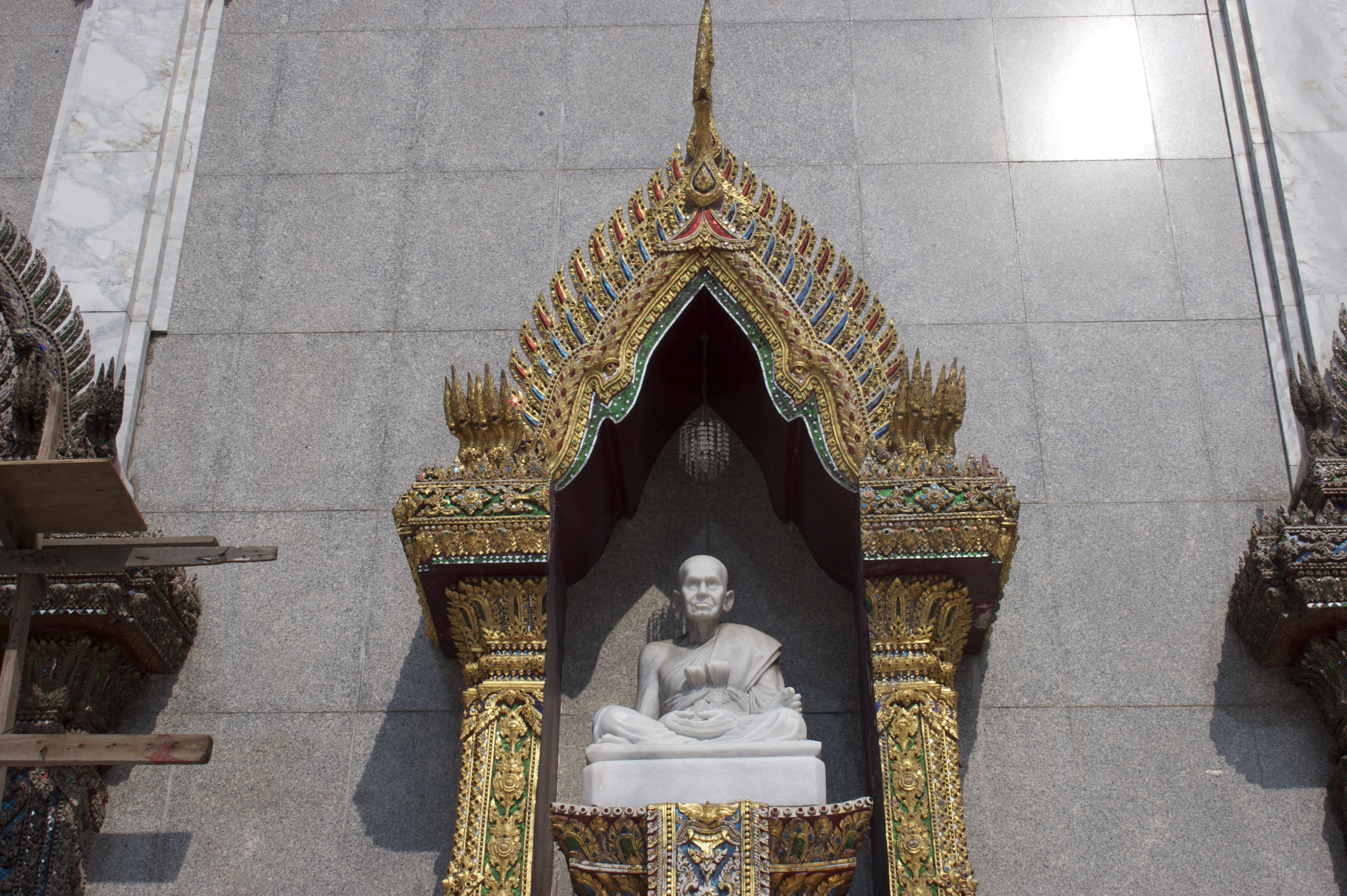
Luang Pho To or Luang Phaw Toh

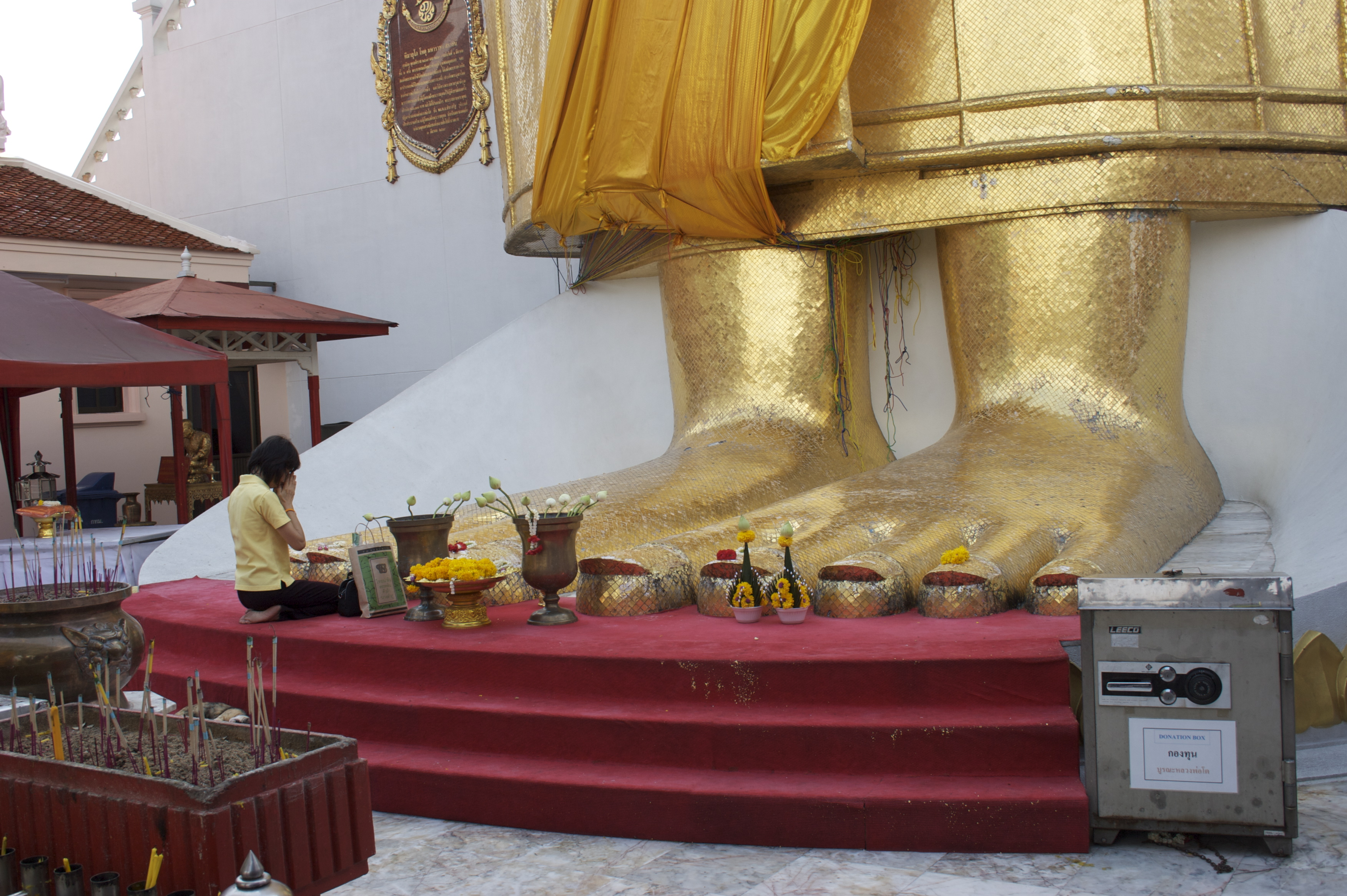
A woman prays at Buddha's feet

== Bibliography ==
- Barrett, Kenneth (18 February 2014). 22 Walks in Bangkok: Exploring the City's Historic Back Lanes and Byways. Tuttle Publishing. ISBN 978-1-4629-1380-0.
- Liedtke, Marcel (4 September 2012). Bangkok Travel Guide: Bangkok & the Surrounding Area. Marcel Liedtke. ISBN 978-1-4792-1773-1.

== See also ==
- Other tallest statues in Thailand
  - Great Buddha of Thailand, the tallest
  - Luangpho Yai, the 2nd-tallest
  - Phuket Big Buddha, the 3rd-tallest
- Wat Intharawihan
- Wat Intharavihara
