= Phuket Big Buddha =

Buddha statue in southern Thailand

Coordinates: 7.827598°N 98.312853°E

- พระพุทธมิ่งมงคลเอกนาคคีรี, Phra Phutta Ming Mongkol Akenakiri
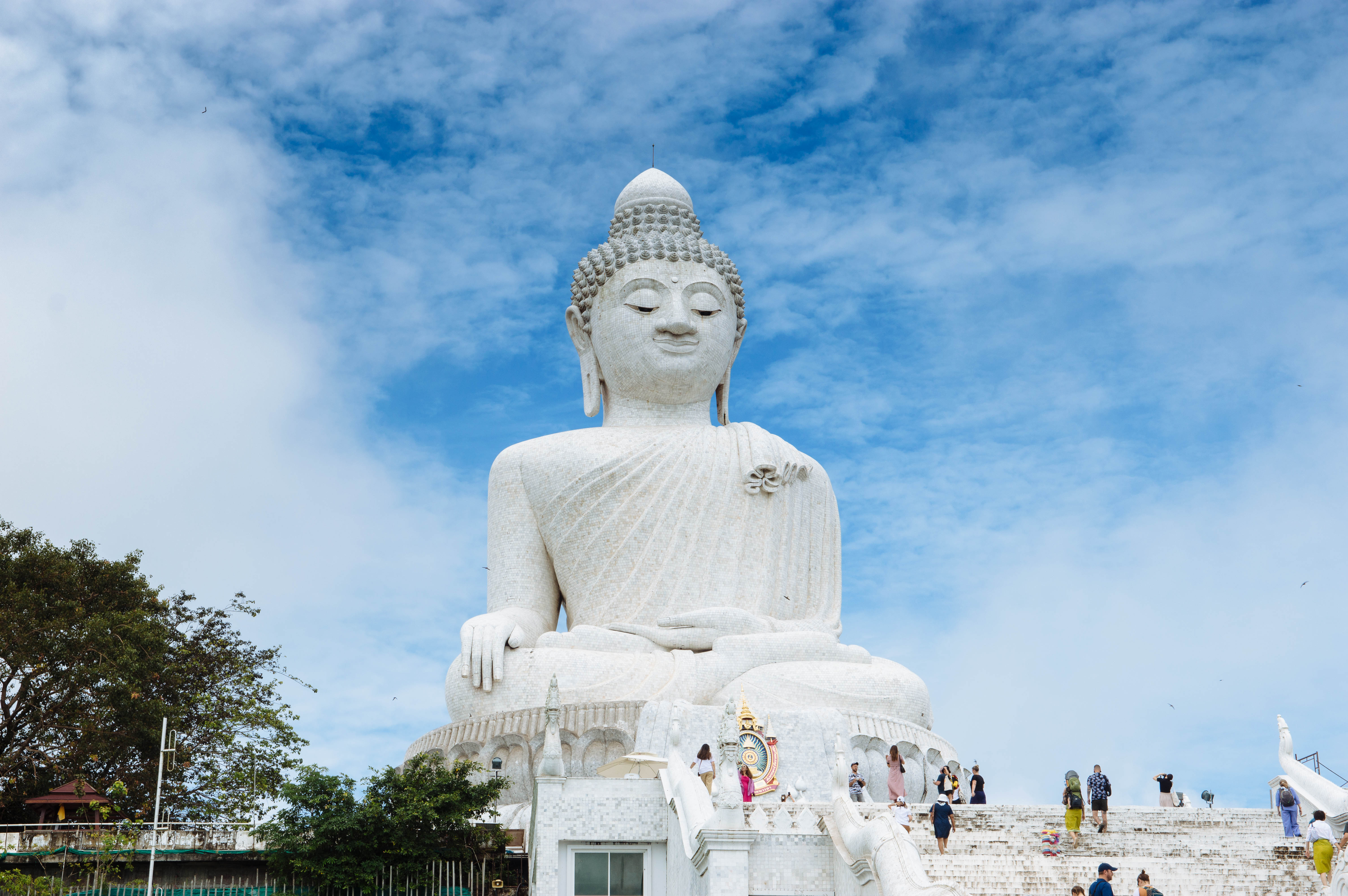
- The Big Buddha, photographed from the frontside, bottom of the stairs.
- Interactive map of Phuket Big Buddha
- Location: Wat Kitthi Sangkharam, Karon, Meaung, Phuket, Thailand
- Type: Buddha statue; Maravijaya Attitude
- Material: Concrete, covered with white marble
- Height: 45 metres (148 ft)
- Beginning date: 2002
- Completion date: 2014
- Dedicated to: Gautama Buddha
- Website: https://www.mingmongkolphuket.com/Index

Phuket Big Buddha, or The Great Buddha of Phuket, is a seated Maravija Buddha statue in Phuket, Thailand. The official name is Phra Phutta Ming Mongkol Eknakiri (Thai: พระพุทธมิ่งมงคลเอกนาคคีรี; RTGS: phra phuttha ming mongkhon eknakhakhiri), shortened to Ming Mongkol Buddha. Sitting atop Nakkerd Hill (also spelt Nagakerd) near Chalong, construction began in 2004. Expansion of the base was ongoing as of 2015. By 2017, 80 percent of the project had been completed. It is the third-tallest statue in Thailand behind only the Great Buddha of Thailand and Luangpho Yai.

The Buddha statue depicts Gautama in a sitting position (Maravichai: มารวิชัย) and is 45 metres (148 feet) tall and 25.45 metres (83.5 feet) wide. It is made of concrete and covered with Burmese white marble. Facing towards Ao Chalong Bay the statue is the main Buddha of the Wat Kitthi Sankaram temple (Wat Kata). The statue was declared the "Buddhist Treasure of Phuket" by Somdet Phra Yanasangwon, the Supreme Patriarch of Thailand, in 2008.

The statue cost 30 million baht (approx. US$950,000 in February 2019), sourced primarily from donations. It was built legally in a national conserved forest with the approval of Thai Royal Forest Department.

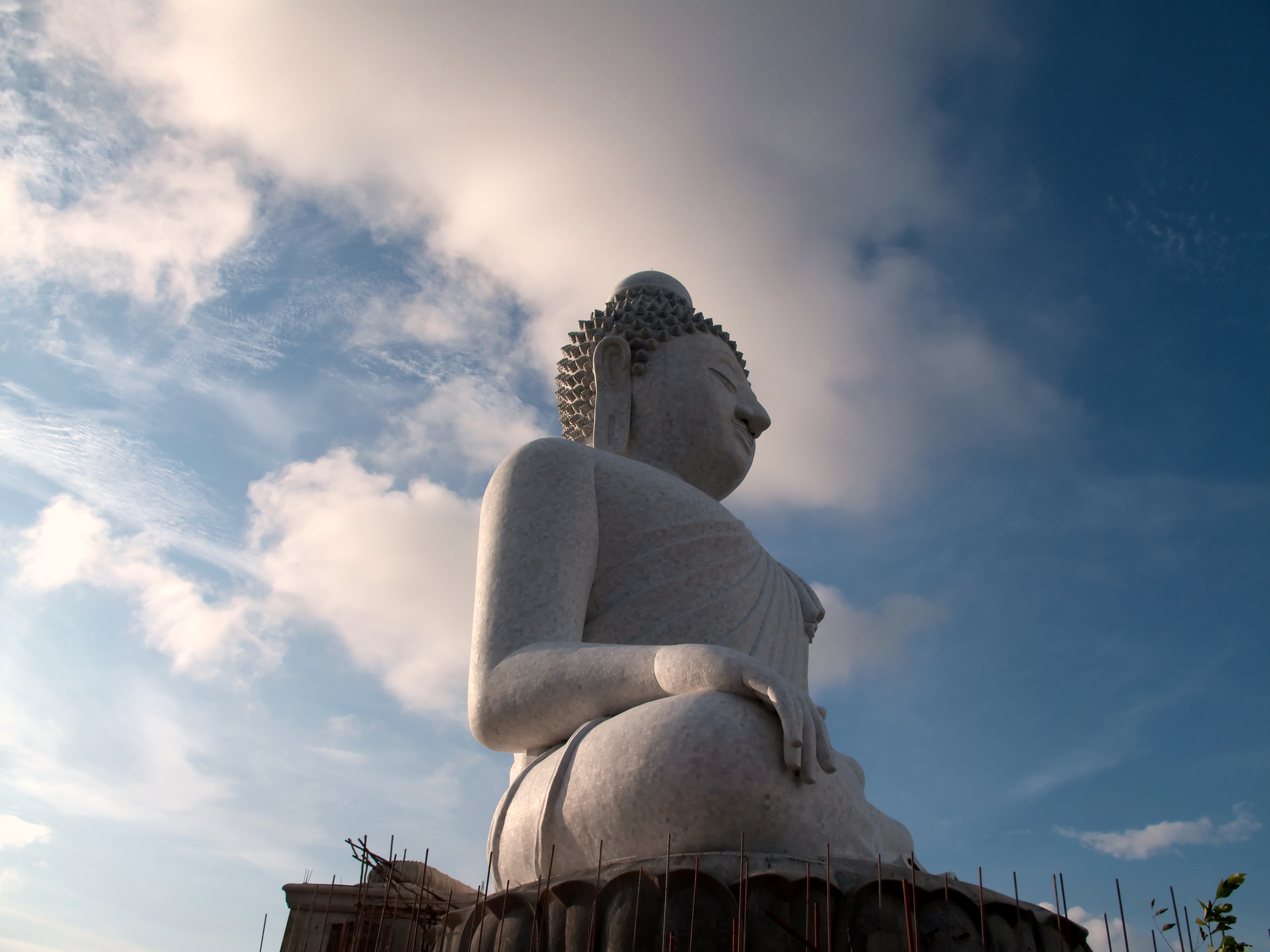
Phuket Big Buddha

== Names ==
The statue's official name is Phra Phutta Ming Mongkol Eknakakiri (Thai: พระพุทธมิ่งมงคลเอกนาคคีรี), which means "The Cherished Auspicious Lord Buddha atop Nāga Hill". The name is a blend of native Thai, Sanskrit, and Pali words – the first element Phra Phutta (Sanskrit varabuddha) means "Lord Buddha"; the second element Ming Mongkol means "cherished and auspicious"; the third element Eknakagiri (from Sanskrit/Pali ekanāgagiri) means "atop Nāga Hill".

== See also ==
- Buddharupa
- Emerald Buddha
- Golden Buddha (Phra Sukhothai Traimit)
- Iconography of Gautama Buddha in Laos and Thailand
- Other tallest statues in Thailand:
  - Great Buddha of Thailand, the tallest
  - Luangpho Yai, the 2nd-tallest
  - Luang Pho To Wat Intaravihara, the 4th-tallest
