= Dakkhinasakha =

Style of the Buddha in Burmese art

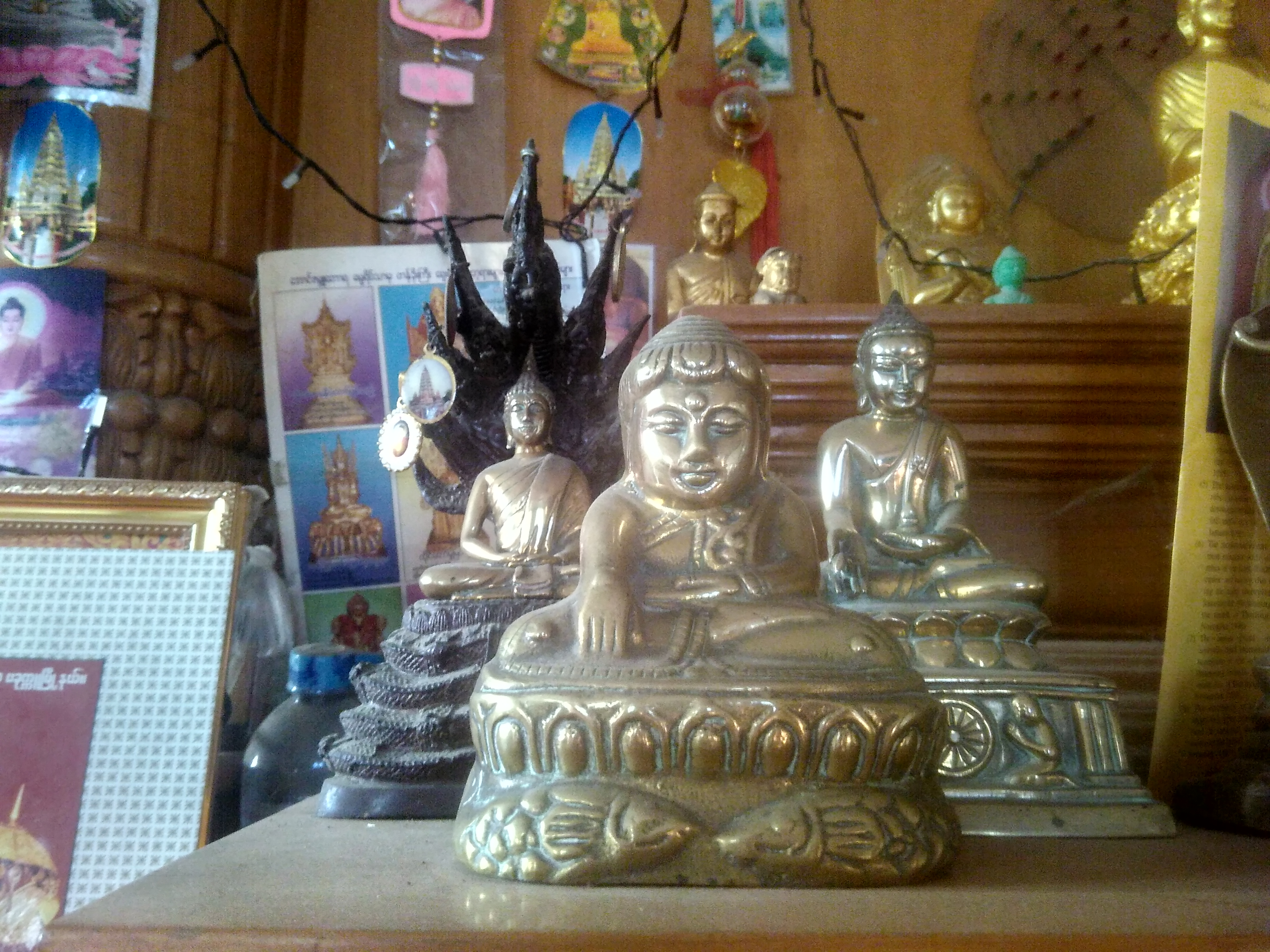
A Dakkhiṇasākhā statue of the Buddha

Dakkhiṇasākhā (Burmese: ဒက္ခိဏသာခါ, Thai: พระทักษิณสาขา, lit. 'southern branch'; also spelt dakkhinasakha) is a style of the Buddha in Burmese art. The style is known as Phra Bua Khem (Thai: พระบัวเข็ม; lit. 'lotus needle Buddha') in neighbouring Thailand, where it has gained a cult following. The iconography is typified by the Buddha in the Maravijaya attitude, wearing an inverted lotus 'cap' and nine needle heads, including one on the forehead, and a pair on the shoulders, elbows, knees, and ankles or soles.

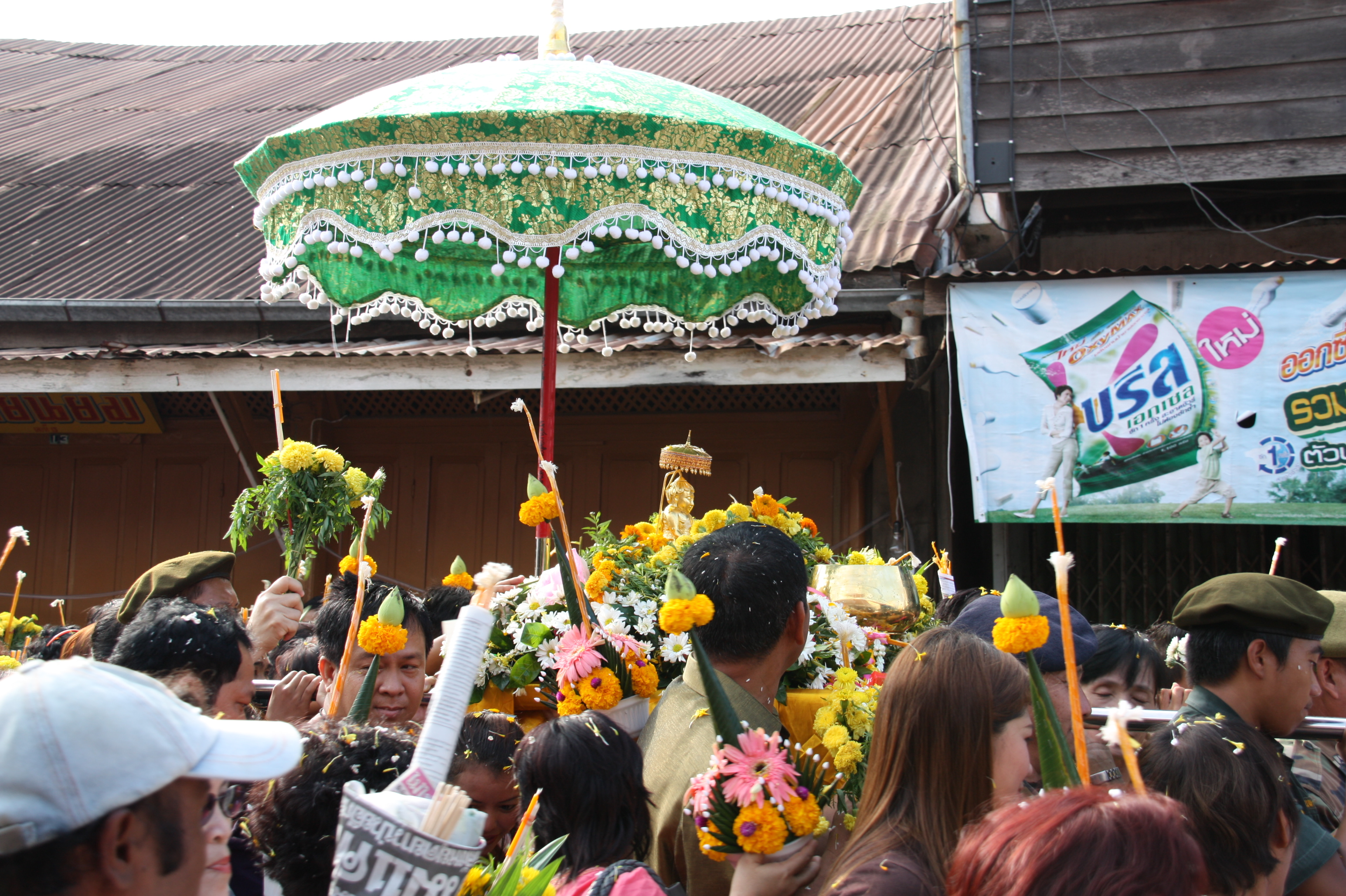
A festival parade of the Dakkhiṇasākhā image at Wat Phra That Phanom, Thailand.

According to the Burmese historian Than Tun, the iconography emerged in Burma (now Myanmar) during the last quarter of the 18th century, from Ceylon (now Sri Lanka). During the Konbaung dynasty, a festival was held in honour of this image of the Buddha. In Myanmar, the Dakkhiṇasākhā image of the Buddha is traditionally consecrated and venerated with the help of Buddhist monks to avert the predicted calamities. The style was subsequently introduced to Thailand during the reign of Mongkut by a Mon monk. In modern-day Thailand, it is commonly conflated with the image of Shin Upagutta.

The name itself literally means 'southern branch' in Pali. According to the Mahāvaṃsa, the southern branch of the sacred fig tree (or 'bo tree') was brought to the Anuradhapura Kingdom by the monk Mahinda, a son of Ashoka, to propagate Buddhism on the island. All sacred fig trees on Sri Lanka are believed to be descendants of the 'southern branch' of that tree, and images of the Buddha were carved using the fig wood. One such tree was transported to the Pagan Kingdom via Thaton by Anawratha.

== Notable images ==
Shwekyimyin Pagoda houses a Dakkhiṇasākhā image of the Buddha venerated by the royal family during the Konbaung dynasty.

== See also ==
- Buddha in art
- Buddhist symbolism
