= Somdet To Brahmaramsi =

Siamese Buddhist monk

Somdet To Brahmaraṃsi
- สมเด็จพระพุฒาจารย์ (โต พฺรหฺมรํสี)
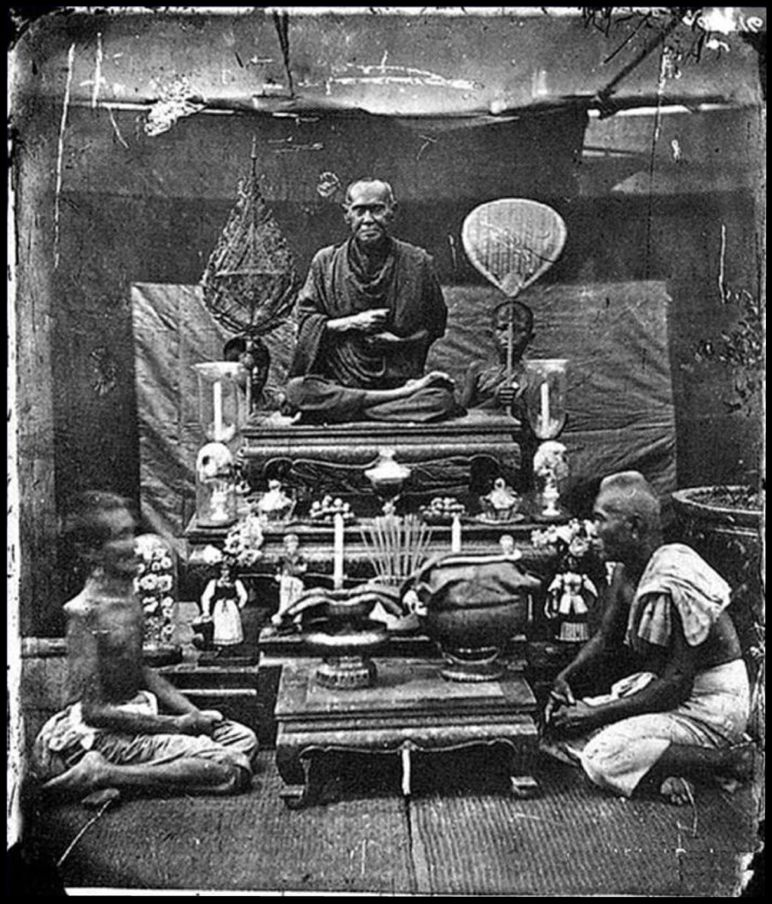
- 1867 portrait

Personal life
- Born: 17 April 1788 Tha Ruea, Ayutthaya, Siam
- Died: 22 June 1872 (aged 84) Wat Intharawihan, Bangkok, Siam
- Era: Rattanakosin Kingdom
- Notable work: Jinapañjara Gāthā
- Education: Wat Bowonniwet Vihara; Wat Rakangkhositaram
- Occupation: Buddhist monk; scholar

Religious life
- Religion: Buddhism
- Denomination: Theravada
- School: Mahā Nikāya
- Dharma name: Brahmaraṃsi
- Monastic name: Buddhācariya

Senior posting
- Students: Mongkut

Somdet To (1788–1872; B.E. 2331–2415), known formally as Somdet Phra Buddhacarya (To Brahmaramsi) (Thai: สมเด็จพระพุฒาจารย์ (โต พฺรหฺมรํสี); RTGS: Somdet Phra Phutthachan (To Phrommarangsi)), was one of the most famous Buddhist monks during Thailand's Rattanakosin period and continues to be the most widely known saintly monk in Thailand. He is revered for spiritual powers and his amulets are sought after. His images and statues are some of the most popular religious icons in Bangkok.

== Biography ==
Somdet To was born in Phra Nakhon Si Ayutthaya Province, alleged to be the illegitimate son of King Rama II. He studied the Buddhist scriptures of the Pāli Canon with several Buddhist masters. After becoming a well-known monk, he became the preceptor for Prince Mongkut, later King Rama IV, when Mongkut became a monk. During Rama IV's reign Somdet To was given the ceremonial name Somdet Phra Buddhacarya (To Brahmaramsi – Buddh[a]charya meaning teacher (acharya) of Buddhism) by the King and used to be one of his trusted advisers, having left a lot of teaching stories around him and the King.

He was noted for the skill of his preaching and his use of Thai poetry to reflect the beauty of Buddhism, and for making amulets called Somdej. The amulets were blessed by himself and other respected monks in Thailand. He also appears in many versions of the story of the ghost Mae Nak Phra Khanong, and he is said to be the one to finally subdue her. Somdet To also wrote the Jinapanjara, a protective magical incantation which is widely chanted and used by Thais.

== Legacy ==
Wat Luang Phor Toh in Sikhio Town features a golden statue representing Somdet To.

== Sources ==
- McDaniel, Justin (2014). The lovelorn ghost and the magical monk: practicing Buddhism in modern Thailand (Paperback ed.). New York, NY: Columbia Univ. Press. ISBN 9780231153775.
- Legends of Somdet Toh, Ven. Thanissaro Bhikkhu,
