= Luangpho Yai =

- พระพุทธรัตนมงคลมหามุนี (Phra Phuttha Rattana Mongkhol Maha Muni)
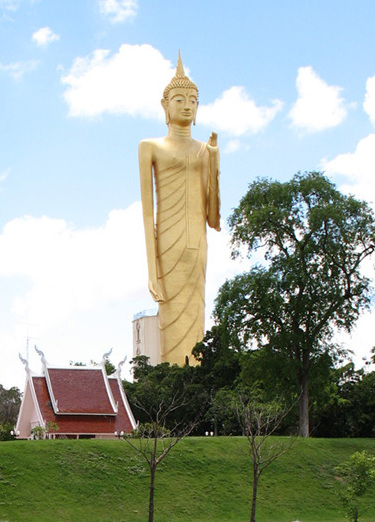
- Interactive map of Luangpho Yai
- Location: Wat Bhurapha Piram, Meaung, Roi Et, Thailand
- Coordinates: 16.0621°N 103.6585°E
- Type: Buddha statue, standing pose
- Material: Concrete
- Height: 59.2 metres (194 ft)
- Completion date: 1973
- Dedicated to: Gautama Buddha

Luangpho Yai (Thai: หลวงพ่อใหญ่, pronounced [lǔa̯ŋ pʰɔ̂ː jàj]), also known as Phra Phutta Rattana Mongkhol Maha Munee (Thai: พระพุทธรัตนมงคลมหามุนี, RTGS: Phra Phuttharattanamongkhon Maha Muni), and The Great Buddha of Roi Et, is the fourth-tallest statue in Thailand.

Located in the Wat Bhurapha Phiram temple in Roi Et Province, this statue stands 59.2 metres (194 ft) tall (or 67.55 metres (221.6 ft) tall, including the base). Construction was completed in 1973. It is covered with mosaic and made of concrete. The sculptor was believed to be a local sculptor. The overview of the Buddha was criticised as "not to the ratio" of any ordinary Buddha. It's assumed that the local sculpture focused on his faithful belief rather than the outside beauty.

The statue depicts the Gautama Buddha in a standing pose. The statue stands as the province's landmark, as being cited in the province's official quote; Leu nam phra yai (ลือนามพระใหญ่, lit. 'famed for its colossal Buddha'). The statue was built by the order of the 5th abbot of the Wat Bhurapha Piram temple, Phra Ratcha Preechayana Munee over the course of 8 years at a cost of approximately 7,000,000 baht.

== Names ==
The formal name, Phra Phuttha Rattana Mongkhol Maha Munee (พระพุทธรัตนมงคลมหามุนี), translates to the "Great Buddha, the Precious and Auspicious Sage," from Sanskrit/Pali varabuddha ratanamaṅgala mahāmuni.

The statue is also known as Luangpho Yai (หลวงพ่อใหญ่) or Luangpho To (หลวงพ่อโต); neither terms refer to any specific Buddha statue. The names literally mean Big Buddha, and are used for any colossal Buddha statue.

== See also ==
- List of tallest statues
- Other tallest statues in Thailand
  - Great Buddha of Thailand, the tallest
  - Phuket Big Buddha, the 3rd-tallest
  - Luang Pho To Wat Intaravihara, the 4th-tallest
