= Dekkhinathiri Township =

Dekkhinathiri Township ဒက္ခိဏသီရိမြို့နယ်
- Township
- Dekkhinathiri Township (red) in Dekkhina District
- Country: Myanmar
- Territory: Naypyidaw Union Territory
- District: Dekkhina District
- Time zone: UTC+6:30 (MMT)

Dekkhinathiri Township (Burmese: ဒက္ခိဏသီရိမြို့နယ်) is one of Naypyidaw Union Territory's eight townships, located south of Mandalay Region in Burma. The township is home to Maravijaya Buddha, the world's largest Buddha marble statue.

== History ==
Dekkhinathiri Township was designated as one of the original townships constituting the new capital region of Naypyidaw on 26 March 2006 by the Ministry of Home Affairs (Myanmar) (MOHA), comprising 2 wards, 6 village tracts and 24 villages. It was named Dekkhinathiri Township on 20 January 2011 by the Ministry of Home Affairs. Dekkhinathiri is derived from Pali dakkhiṇasiri, and literally means "splendor of the south."

== Demographics ==
=== 2014 ===
Historical population
Year	Pop.	±%
2014	51,328	—

The 2014 Myanmar Census reported that Dekkhinathiri Township had a population of 51,328. The population density was 328.8 people per km^{2}. The census reported that the median age was 25.1 years, and 111 males per 100 females. There were 6,997 households; the mean household size was 3.9.

=== Ethnic makeup ===
Ethnic composition of Dekkhinathiri Township
Ethnic group	Percentage
Bamar	100%
Source: 2019 GAD township report

The Bamar make up the majority of the township's population.
