= The Great Buddha (painting) =

Painting by Paul Gauguin

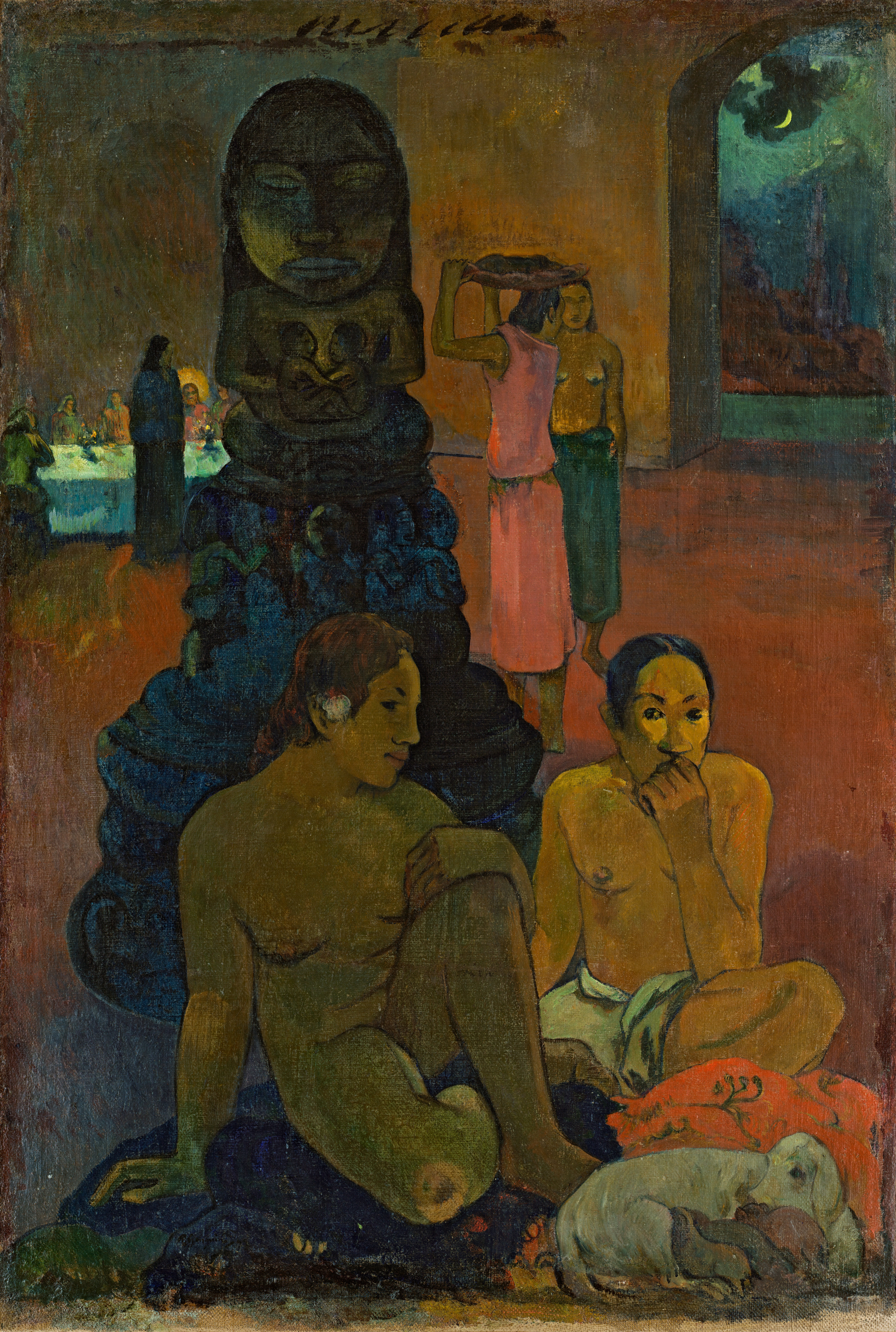
- Artist: Paul Gauguin
- Year: 1896
- Medium: oil on canvas
- Dimensions: 95 cm × 134 cm (37 in × 53 in)
- Location: Pushkin Museum, Moscow

The Great Buddha (French: Le Grand Buddha) is an oil on canvas painting by Paul Gauguin, from 1899, now in the Pushkin Museum in Moscow.

The artist produced the work during his second trip to Polynesia. Georges Wildenstein, compiler of a catalogue raisonné of Gauguin's work, states that since the artist's signature is difficult to distinguish the work could also have been 1896 or 1898, though he himself dated it to 1899. Gauguin sent the finished work to Europe and his friend George-Daniel de Monfreid kept it in Paris.
