= Maravijaya Buddha =

Buddha statue in Naypyidaw, Myanmar

Māravijaya Buddha
- မာရဝိဇယဗုဒ္ဓရုပ်ပွားတော်
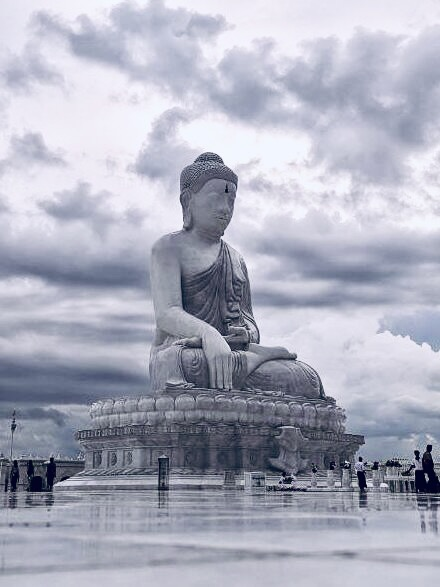

- Location within Myanmar

Religion
- Affiliation: Buddhism
- Sect: Theravada
- Region: Naypyidaw Union Territory

Location
- Location: Naypyidaw
- Country: Myanmar
- Interactive map of Māravijaya Buddha
- Coordinates: 19.700954926140046°N 96.05990090948225°E

Architecture
- Founder: State Administration Council
- Completed: 2023

Specifications
- Length: 81 feet (25 m)
- Materials: Sagyin (စကျင်)

Māravijaya Buddha (Burmese: မာရဝိဇယဗုဒ္ဓရုပ်ပွားတော်) is an 81 feet (25 m) marble statue of the Buddha in Dekkhinathiri Township, Naypyidaw, the national capital of Myanmar. The image, which features the bhumiphassa mudra, is the world's largest marble Buddha statue. The statue itself weighs 5,292 tons, built using marble quarried from Sagyin (စကျင်), near Mandalay. The image is located on a 91-hectare site, which also features stone inscriptions, stupas, religious buildings, and a Mucalinda pond.

== History ==
Construction of the Buddha began on 14 June 2020, and was announced in state-run newspapers in the aftermath of the 2021 Myanmar coup d'état. The image's name Maravijaya, literally means "to conquer Mara (မာန်နတ်)." Ongoing construction was overseen by allies of the military junta, Ashin Chekinda and Sitagu Sayadaw. State-run media was used to solicit donations from the public for the ongoing project, which cost US$27.6 million. Close associates of the military, including businessmen and high-ranking retired military officers, contributed 33 billion kyats (est. US$10 million) to the project.

In March 2023, the Buddha's image was reportedly seen "crying", as stripes appeared beneath the statue's eyes, prompting the junta to cover its face and bar visitors and photographs of the statue.

On 1 August 2023, the statue was officially consecrated in a buddhābhiṣeka ceremony attended by 900 monks, coinciding with the full moon day of Waso. In a sermon during the ceremony, the Kyaukme Sayadaw, Candanasāra, distilled the essence of Buddhism into three short phrases using a three-finger gesture, appearing to indirectly criticise the military junta for violating these fundamental precepts. That same day, Military junta leader Min Aung Hlaing removed Ko Ko, the incumbent minister for religion and culture from his post, citing 'health reasons.'

The statue's attributes are closely connected with the number nine, which is considered auspicious in Burmese numerology. The image's combined weight of 5,292 tons has numerological significance, as the individual digits can add up to nine, while the throne's height of 18 feet (5.5 m) and statue's height of 63 feet (19 m) also add up to the number nine. The statue is also surrounded by 720 stone stupas.

== Controversy ==
The project has been criticised for being a "vanity project" of Min Aung Hlaing and seen as a way for him to gain public legitimacy, as a protector and promoter of Buddhism, to whitewash his legacy, and to prolong his rule. Previous military juntas have constructed similar temples, including the marble Kyauktawgyi Buddha in Yangon. Min Aung Hlaing specifically constructed a new road to visit the construction site, in order to bypass Naypyidaw Prison, which is also on the Naypyidaw Ring Road.

== Gallery ==
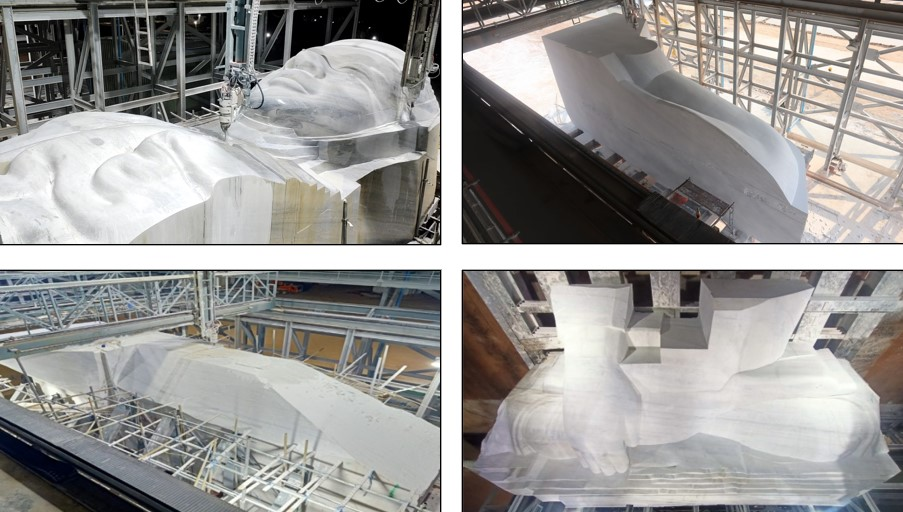
Parts of the statue during the construction

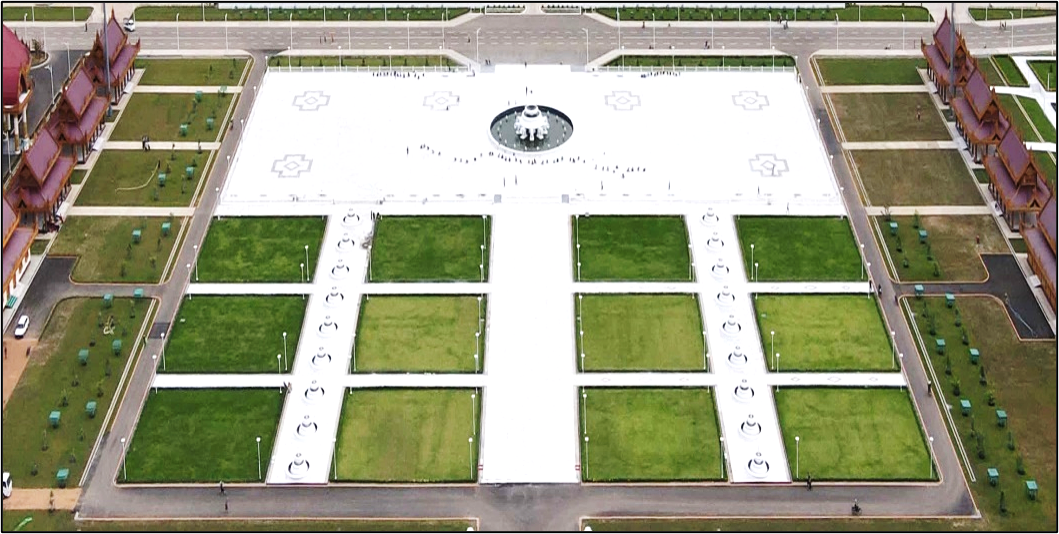
Fountain square in the area of the statue

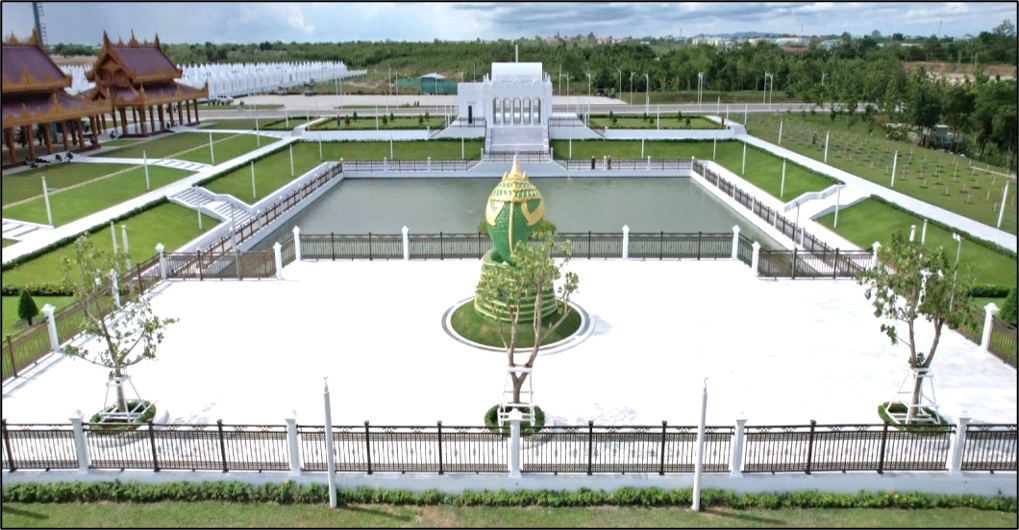
Lake in the area of the statue with a Nagayone Paya (နဂါးရုံဘုရား)

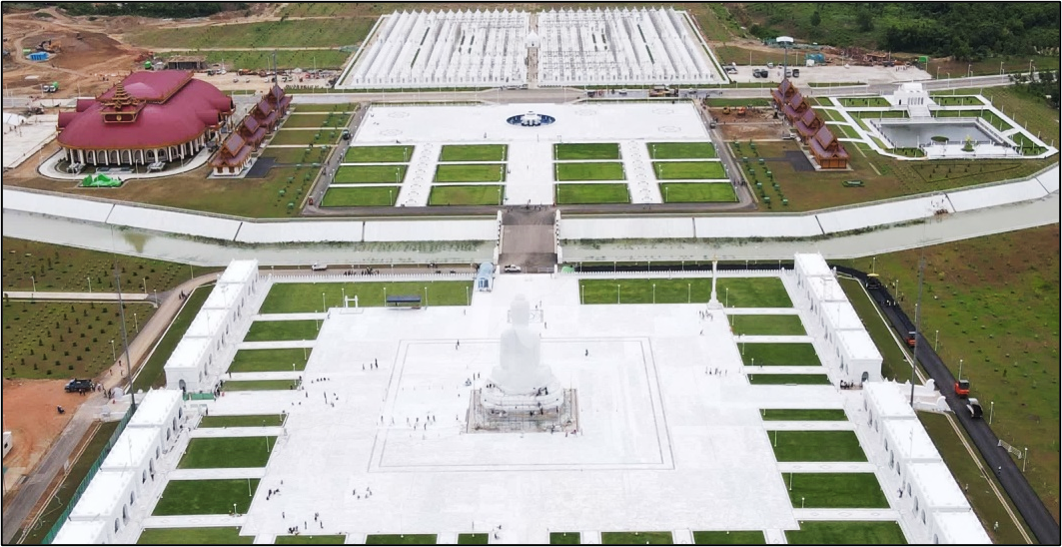
Sanctuary of engraved stones in the area of the statue

== See also ==
- Burmese pagoda
- Buddhism in Myanmar
- History of Buddhism
- List of tallest statues
