= Great Buddha of Thailand =

Tallest statue in Thailand

- พระพุทธมหานวมินทรศากยมุนีศรีวิเศษชัยชาญ (Phra Phuttha Mahanawamintra Sakayamunee Sri Visejchaicharn)
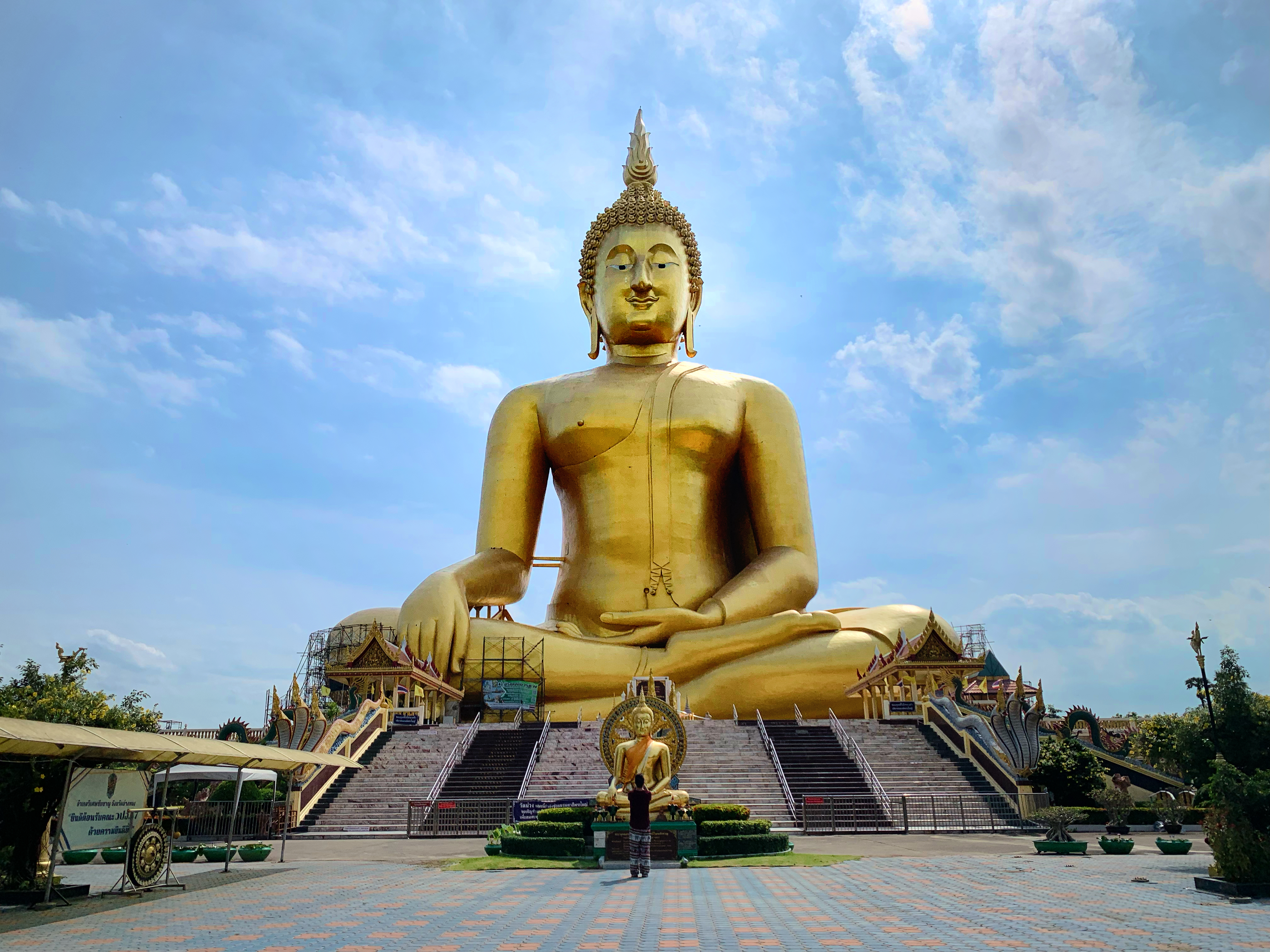
- The statue in 2024
- Interactive map of Great Buddha of Thailand
- Location: Wat Muang, Wiset Chai Chan, Ang Thong, Thailand
- Coordinates: 14°35′35.60″N 100°22′40.02″E
- Type: Buddha statue in Maravijaya attitude
- Material: Concrete
- Height: 92 metres (302 ft)
- Completion date: 2008
- Dedicated to: Buddha (Guatama)

The Big Buddha of Thailand, also known as The Great Buddha, The Big Buddha of Thailand, and Phra Buddha Maha Nawaminthara Sakayamunee Visejchaicharn (Thai: พระพุทธมหานวมินทรศากยมุนีศรีวิเศษชัยชาญ; RTGS: Phra Phuttha Maha Nawaminthara Sakkayamuni Si Wiset Chai Chan), is a statue of the Buddha, located in Ang Thong Province of Thailand. It is the tallest statue in Thailand, the second-tallest statue in Southeast Asia, and the ninth-tallest in the world.

Located at the Wat Muang temple in the Ang Thong Province, this statue stands 92m (300ft) high, and is 63m (210ft) wide. Construction commenced in 1990, and was completed in 2008. It is painted gold and made of concrete. The Buddha is in the seated posture called Maravijaya Attitude.

The statue was built following the order of Phra Kru Vibul Arjarakhun, the first abbot of Wat Muang temple, in order to commemorate the King Bhumibol of Thailand. The statue was built using the donated money from faithful Buddhists considering as the act of making merit. The budget spent on the statue was roughly 104,200,000 baht. Not far from the statue is believed to be the Wat Muang temple. The exact origins of the temple are unknown, as the original temple was destroyed in the 18th century during the war with the Burmese - they invaded and looted the former Thai capital of Ayutthaya. The reconstruction of Wat Muang took a long time and was not completed until 1982, and 8 years later work began on the 'Big Buddha', which was completed 18 years later. Nearby are more sculptures which depict the gods, the kings of Thailand and the events of the Siamo-Burma War. Also around the Buddha is a park where lotus flowers grow.

== Names ==
The statue's formal name, Phra Phuttha Mahanawamintra Sakayamunee Sri Visejchaicharn (Thai: พระพุทธมหานวมินทรศากยมุนีศรีวิเศษชัยชาญ), was given by Phra Khru Vibul Arjarakun, and means "the Lord Buddha of Wiset Chai Chan, Built in Honor of King Bhumibol." The name is a blend of Sanskrit words: Phra Phuttha (lit. 'Lord Buddha', Sanskrit varabuddha); Mahanawamintra (Bhumibol's royal title, Sanskrit mahānavamindra), Sakayamunee (Sanskrit śākyamunī), and Visejchaicharn (Sanskrit śrīviśeṣajayajāña)

The statue is also known as Luangpho Yai (หลวงพ่อใหญ่) or Luangpho To (หลวงพ่อโต); neither terms refer to any specific Buddha statue. The names literally mean Big Buddha, and are used for any colossal Buddha statue.

== See also ==
- Buddhism in Thailand
- Buddhist art
- Laykyun Sekkya
- List of tallest statues
- Other tallest statues in Thailand:
  - Phra Phuttha Chok at Wat Khao Wong Phrachan, the 2nd-tallest (75 m)
  - Guan Yin at Wat Huay Pla Kang, the 3rd-tallest (69 m)
  - Phra Buddha Dhammakaya Dhepmongkol at Wat Paknam Bhasicharoen, the 3rd-tallest (69 m)
  - Luangpho Yai, the 5th-tallest (59.2 m)
  - Phuket Big Buddha, the 6th-tallest (45 m)
