= Architecture of India =

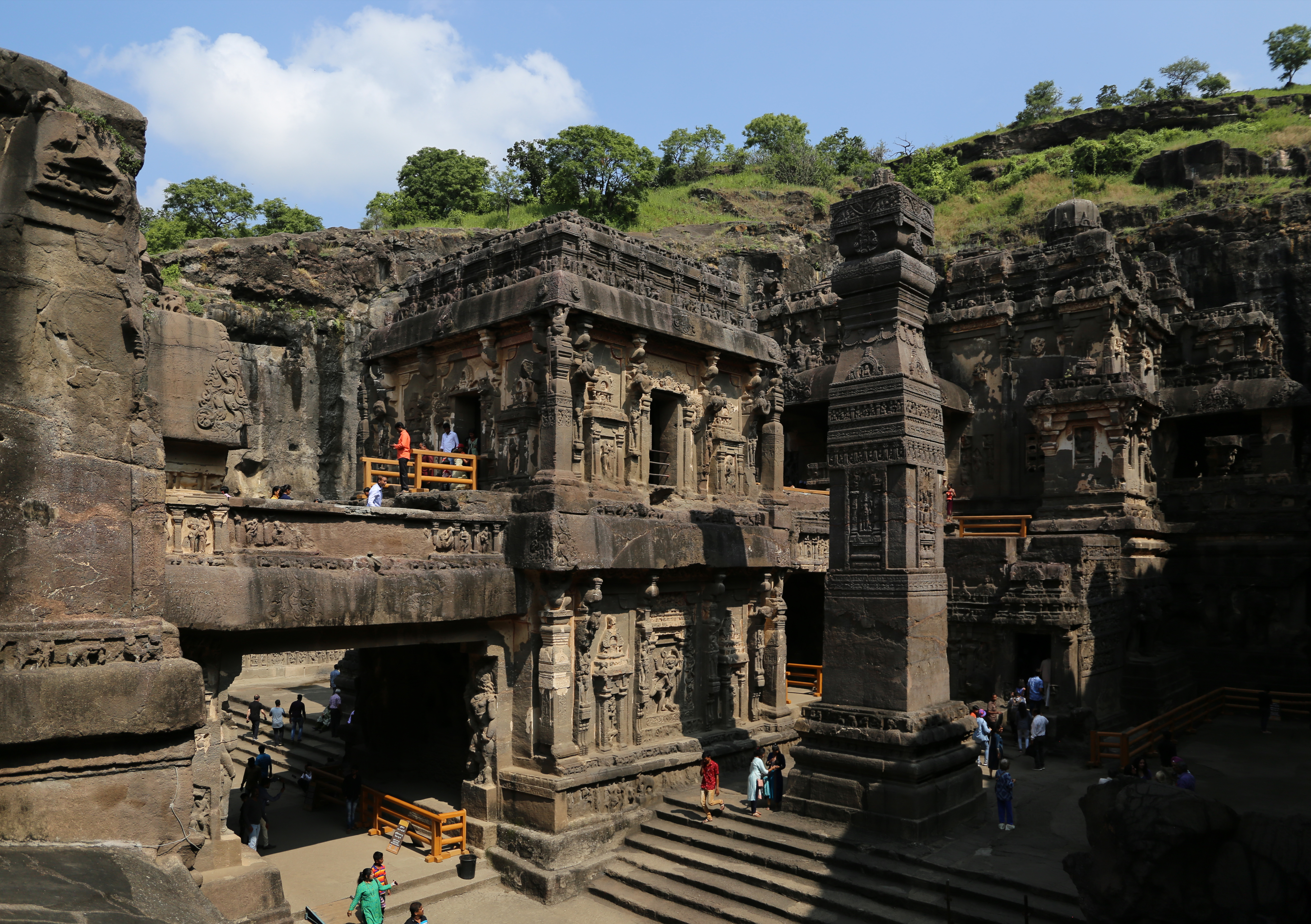
Kailash Temple, Ellora Caves is an example of Indian rock-cut architecture.

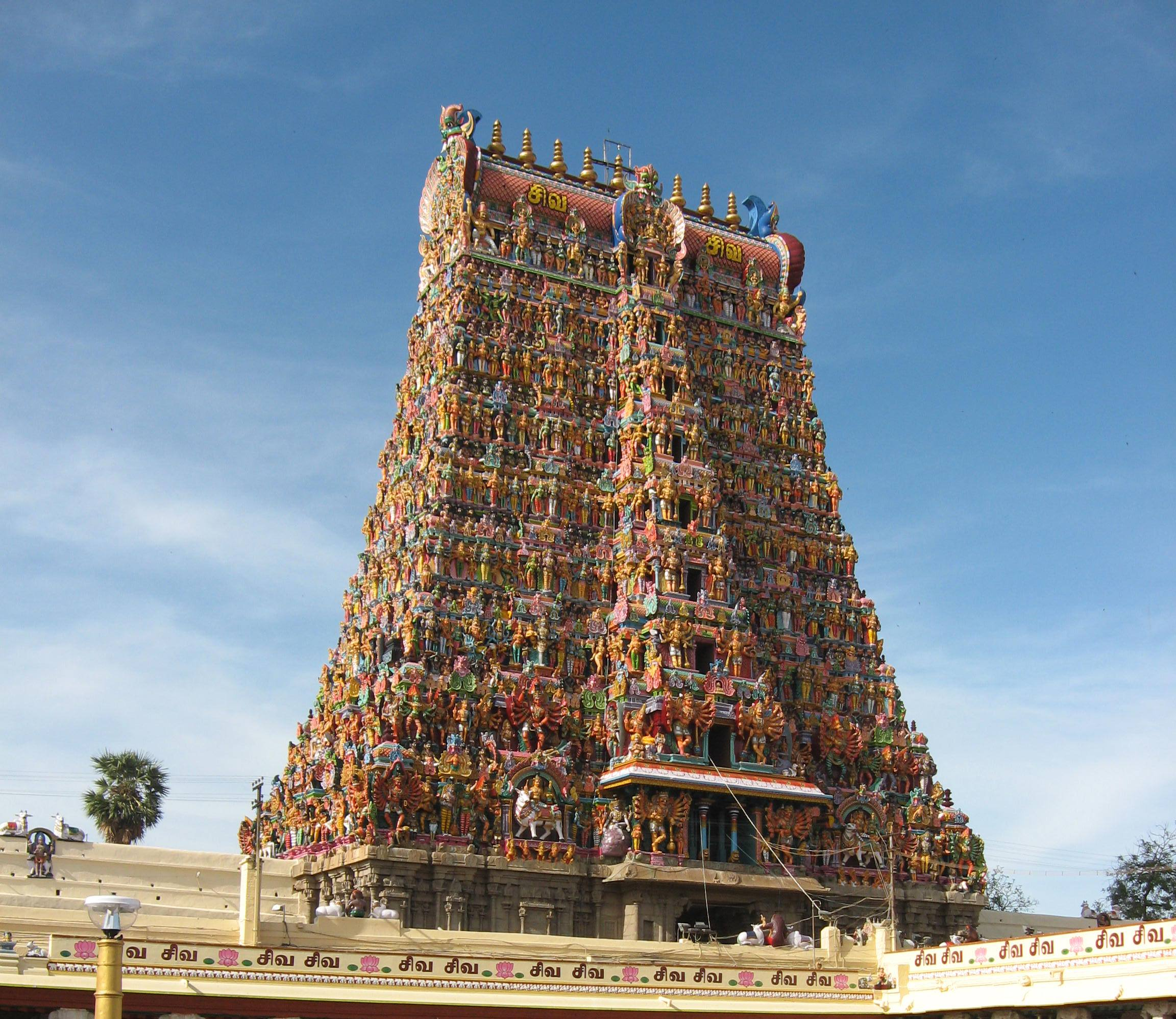
Tamil architecture gopuram at Meenakshi Temple

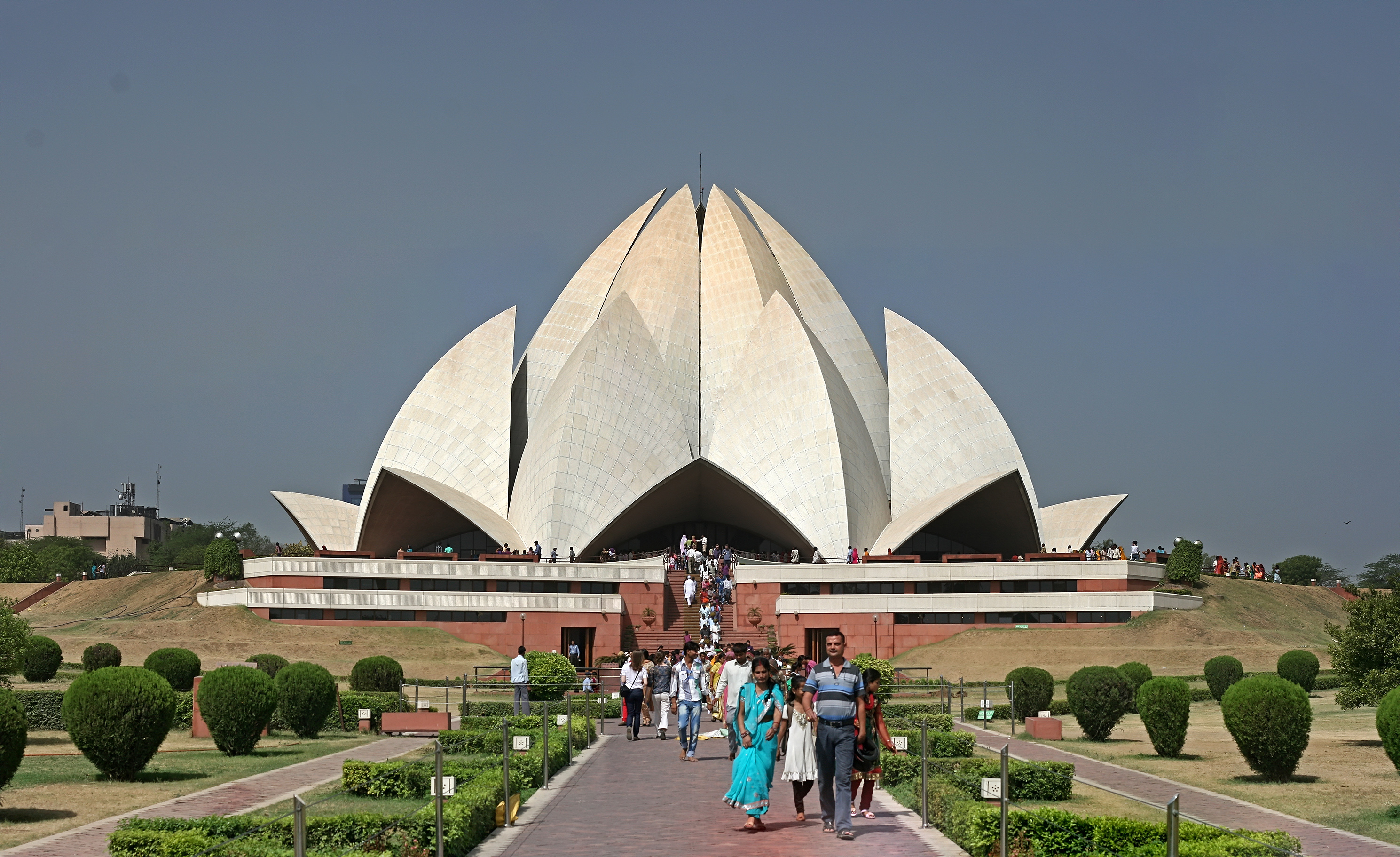
The Lotus Temple in New Delhi.

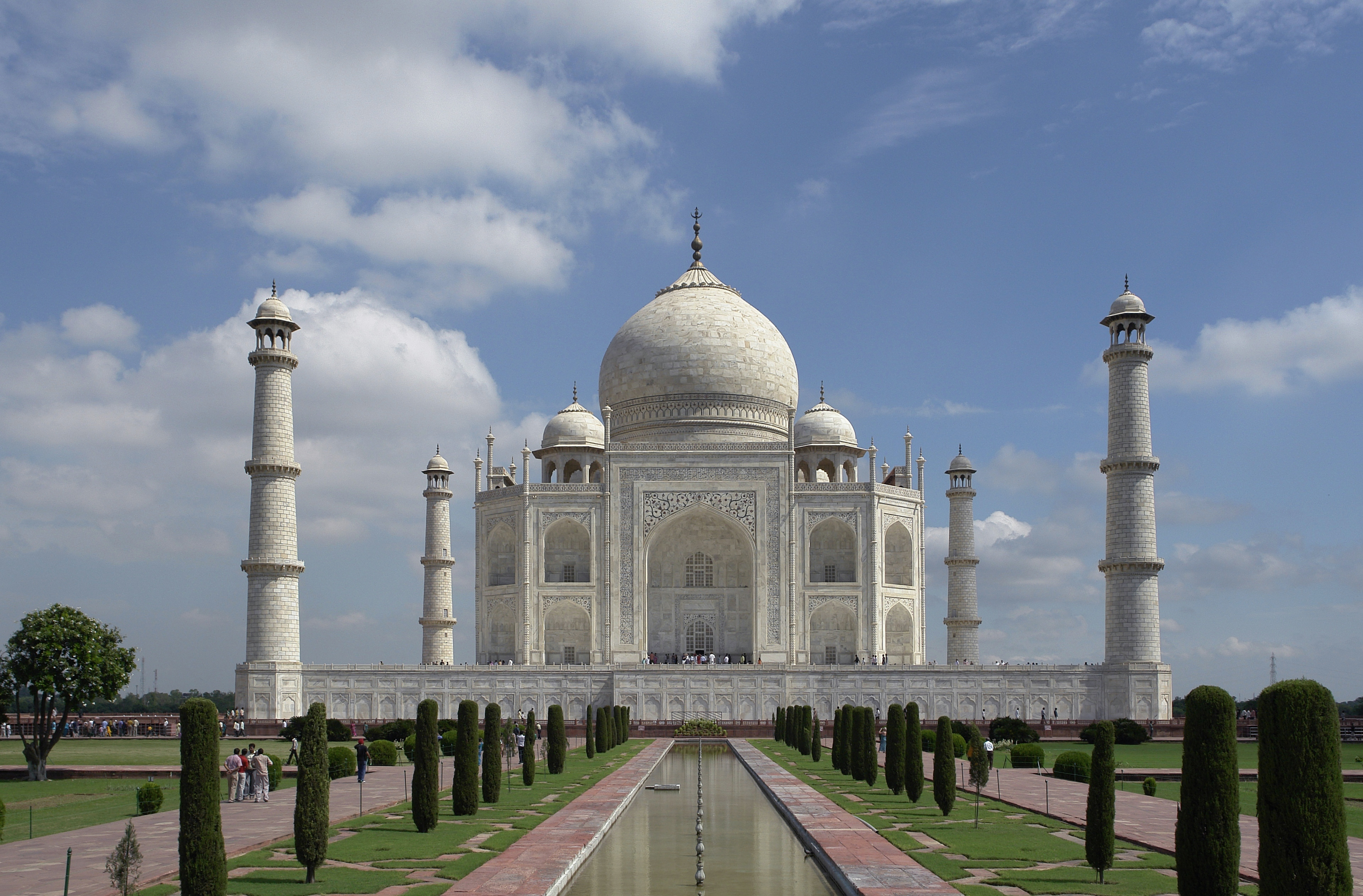
The Taj Mahal, Agra.

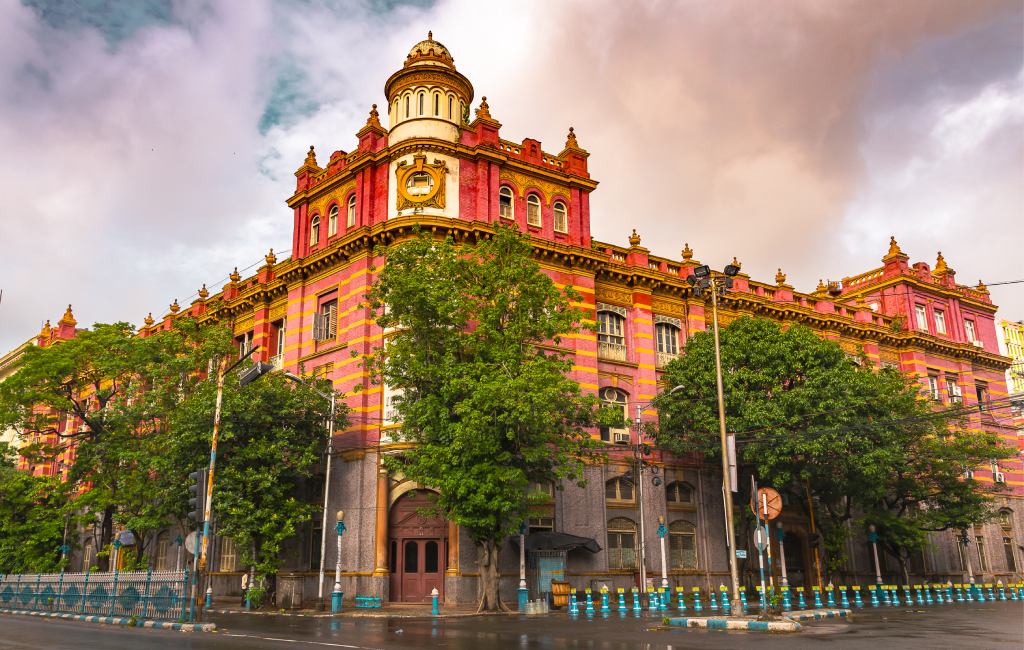
Dalhousie Square, built during British Raj, is an example of the fusion of Indian and Renaissance architecture.

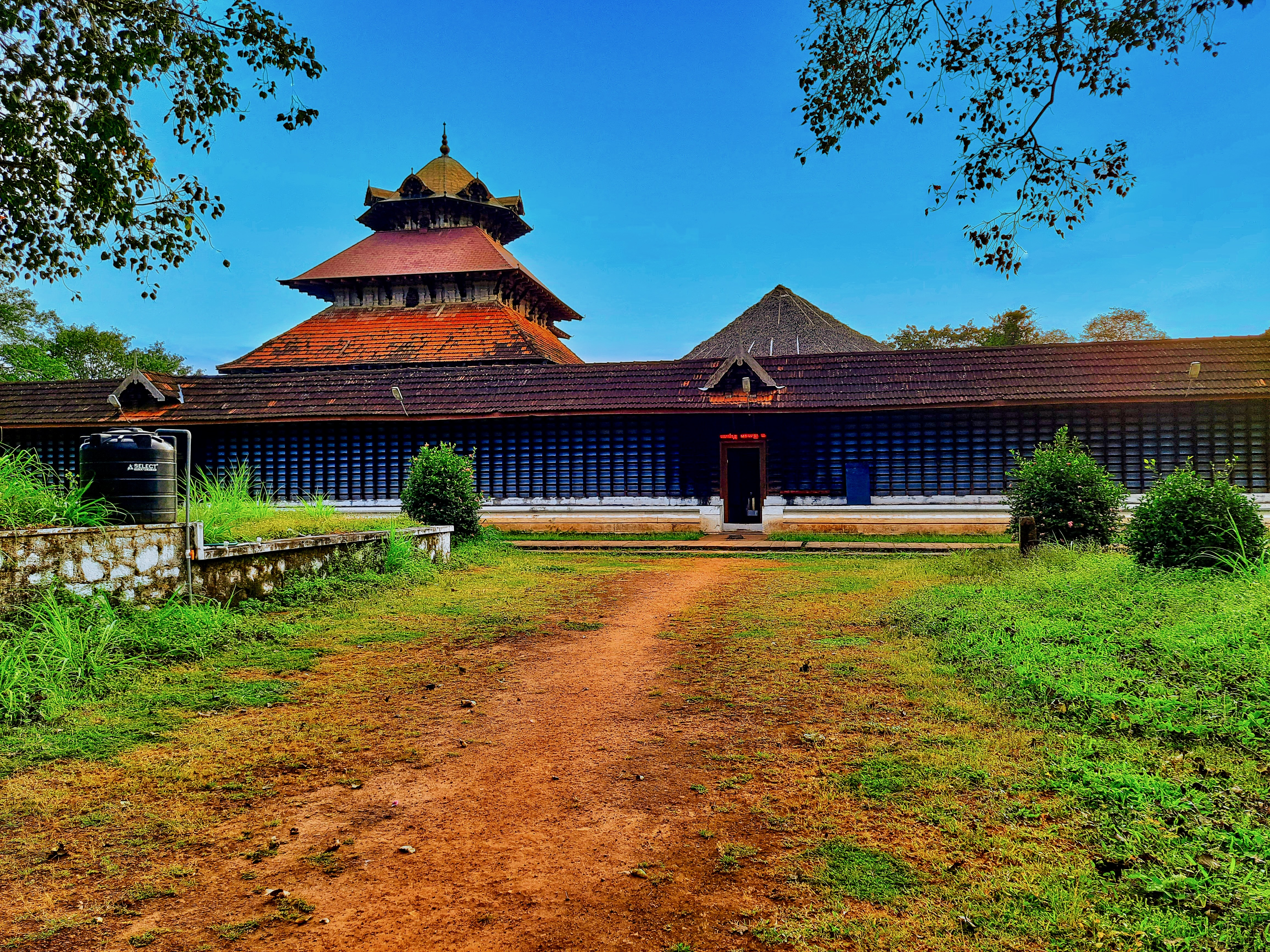
Peruvanam Mahadeva Temple in Thrissur, is an example of Kerala architecture.

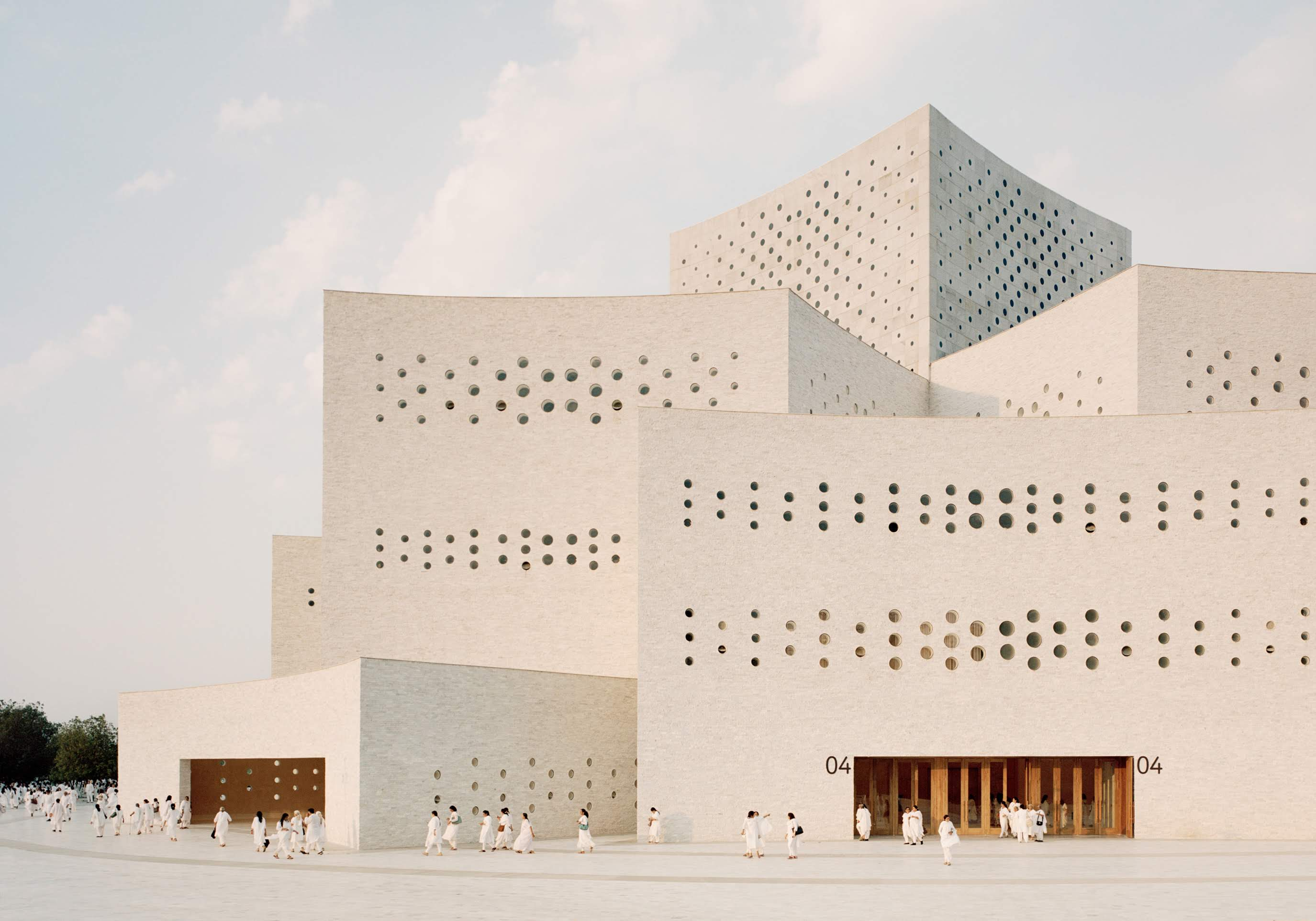
Raj Sabhagruh, a spiritual and convention complex at Shrimad Rajchandra Ashram Dharampur in Valsad whose architecture is inspired by Samavasarana in Jainism and Nalanda University.

Indian architecture is rooted in the history, culture, and religion of India. Among multiple architectural styles and traditions, the best-known include the many built in accordance to Indian religion and philosophy with Hindu, Jain, Buddhist, and Sikh styles of architecture being the most prevalent in India, with Indo-Islamic architecture, Rajput architecture, Mughal architecture, South Indian architecture, and Indo-Saracenic architecture having a strong presence as well.

Early Indian architecture was made from wood, which did not survive due to rotting and instability in the structures. Instead, the earliest surviving examples of Indian architecture are Indian rock-cut architecture, including many Buddhist, Hindu, and Jain temples.

Hindu temple architecture is traditionally divided into two main architectural styles: the Dravidian style of southern India and Nagara style of northern India, with several regional variations that combine elements of both. Other regional styles, such as the Vesara style of the Deccan plateau and the Kalinga style of eastern India, developed through local tastes. In addition to temple architecture, domestic housing styles in India also vary widely between regions, reflecting differences in climate, geography, building materials, and cultural traditions.

The first major Islamic empire in India was the Delhi Sultanate, which led to the development of Indo-Islamic architecture, combining Indian and Islamic architectural features. The rule of the Mughal Empire, when Mughal architecture evolved, is regarded as the zenith of Indo-Islamic architecture, with the Taj Mahal being the high point of their contribution. Indo-Islamic architecture got influenced by existing indigenous Hindu elements of style and later fused with Rajput and Sikh architecture as well.

During the British colonial period, European styles including Neoclassical, Gothic Revival, and Baroque became prevalent across India. The amalgamation of Indo-Islamic and European styles led to a new style, known as the Indo-Saracenic style. Following the events succeeding India's independence from Britain, new European modernist ideas spread amongst Indian architects as a means of progressing as a new republic. Swiss-French architect Le Corbusier was commissioned by the Indian government to design the city of Chandigarh, which influenced a generation of architects towards modernism in the 20th century. The continued economic reforms further bolstered modern architecture and the urban layout of India, as the country became more integrated with the world's economy.

== Neolithic period ==
In South India, the Neolithic period began in 6500 BCE and lasted till around 1400 BCE when the Megalithic transition period began. The South Indian Neolithic period is characterized by ash mounds from 2500 BCE in the region of Karnataka, which later expanded into Tamil Nadu.

Neolithic Structures

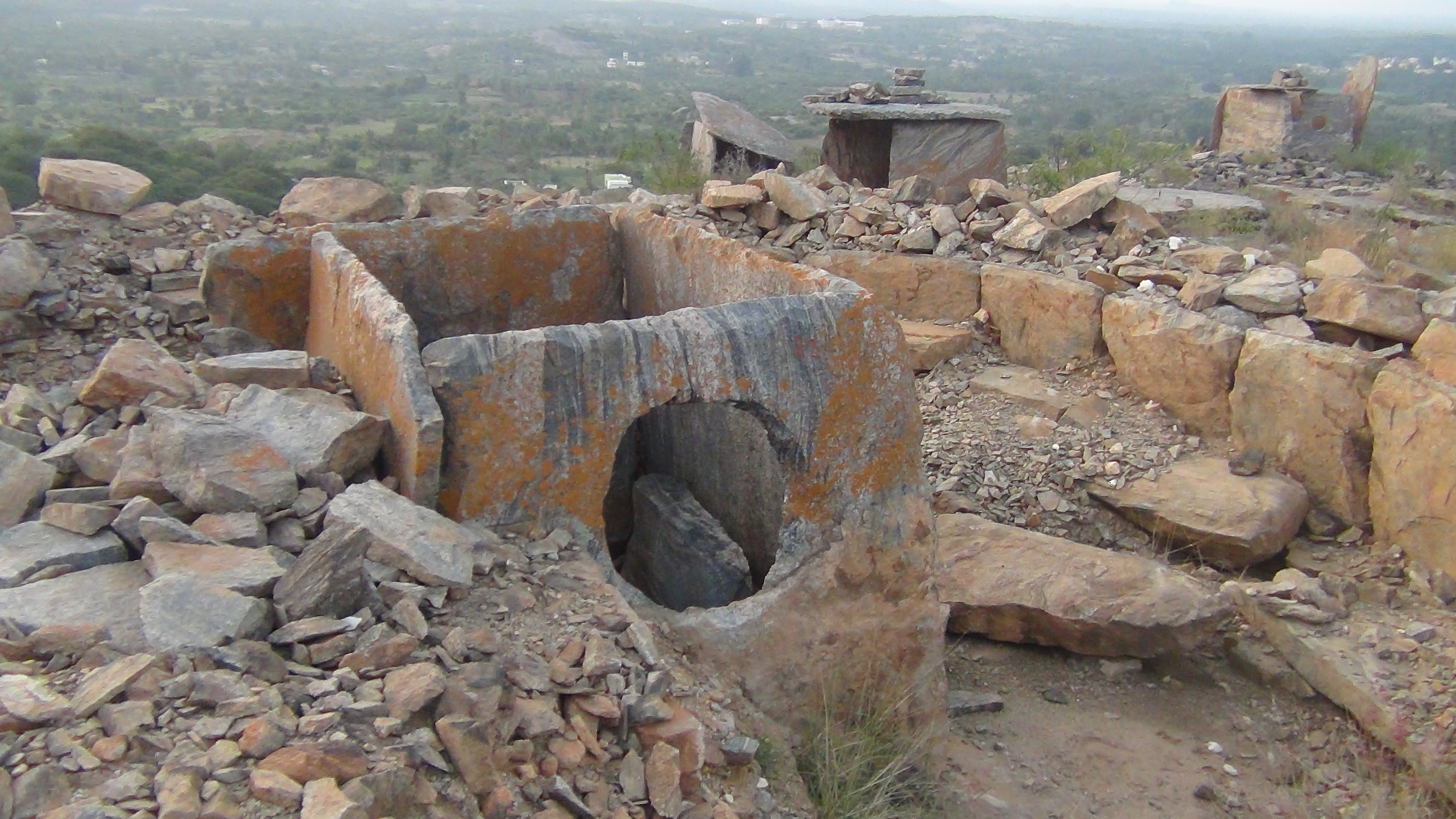
Megalithic Dolmens in Mallachandram, Tamil Nadu

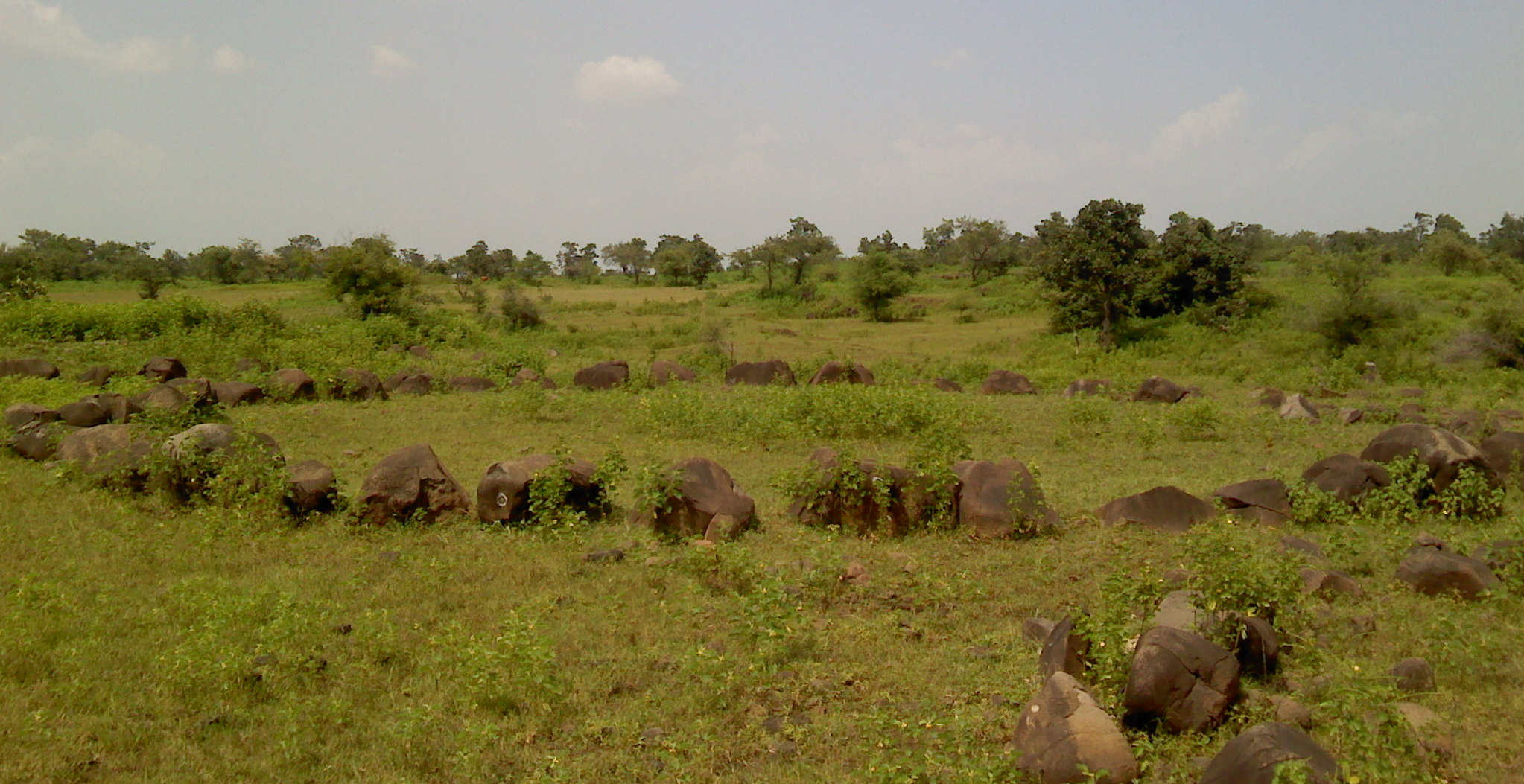
Stone circle at Junapani, Nagpur

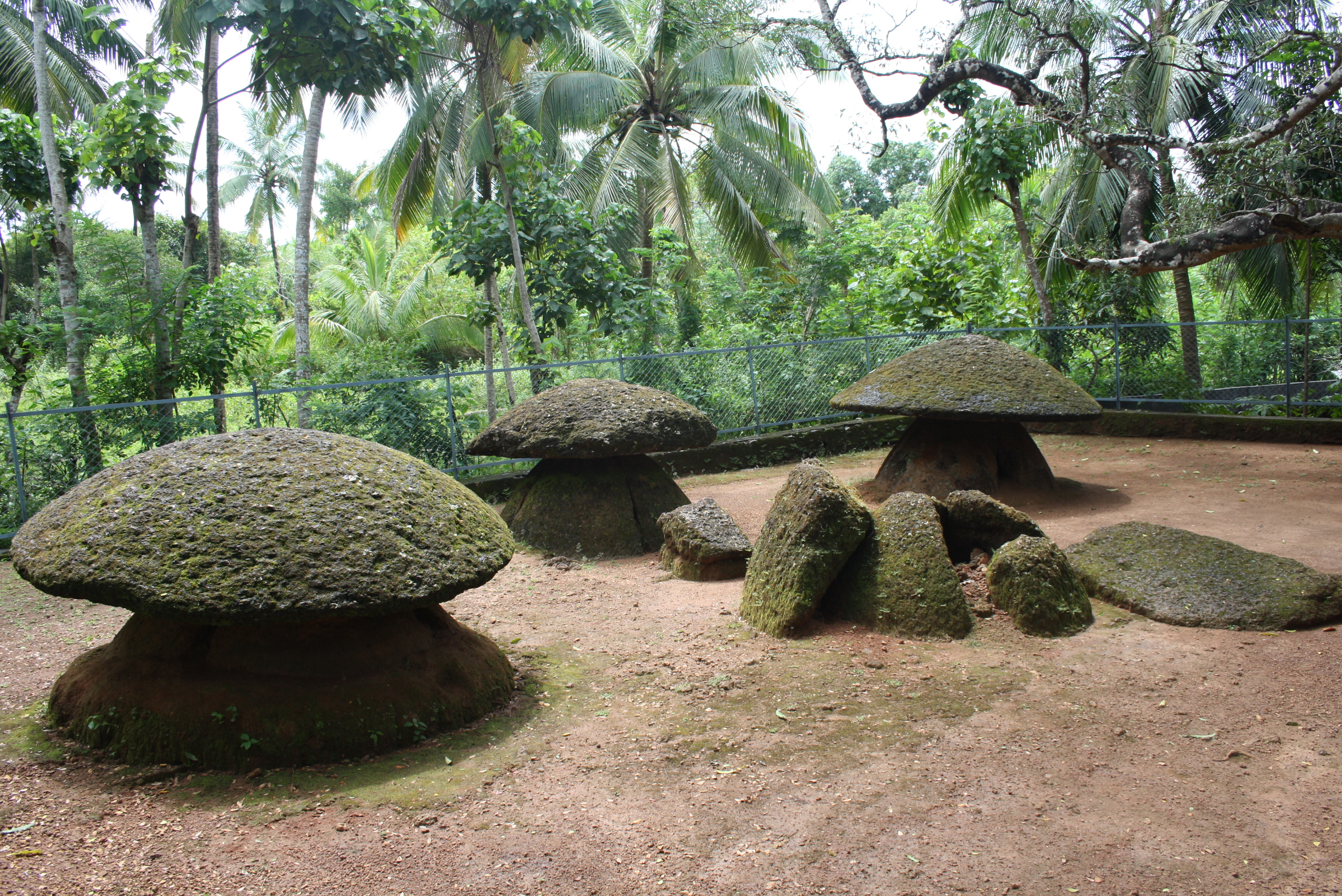
Stone Umbrellas shaped Megalithic burials of Stone Age are situated in Ariyannur, Kerala

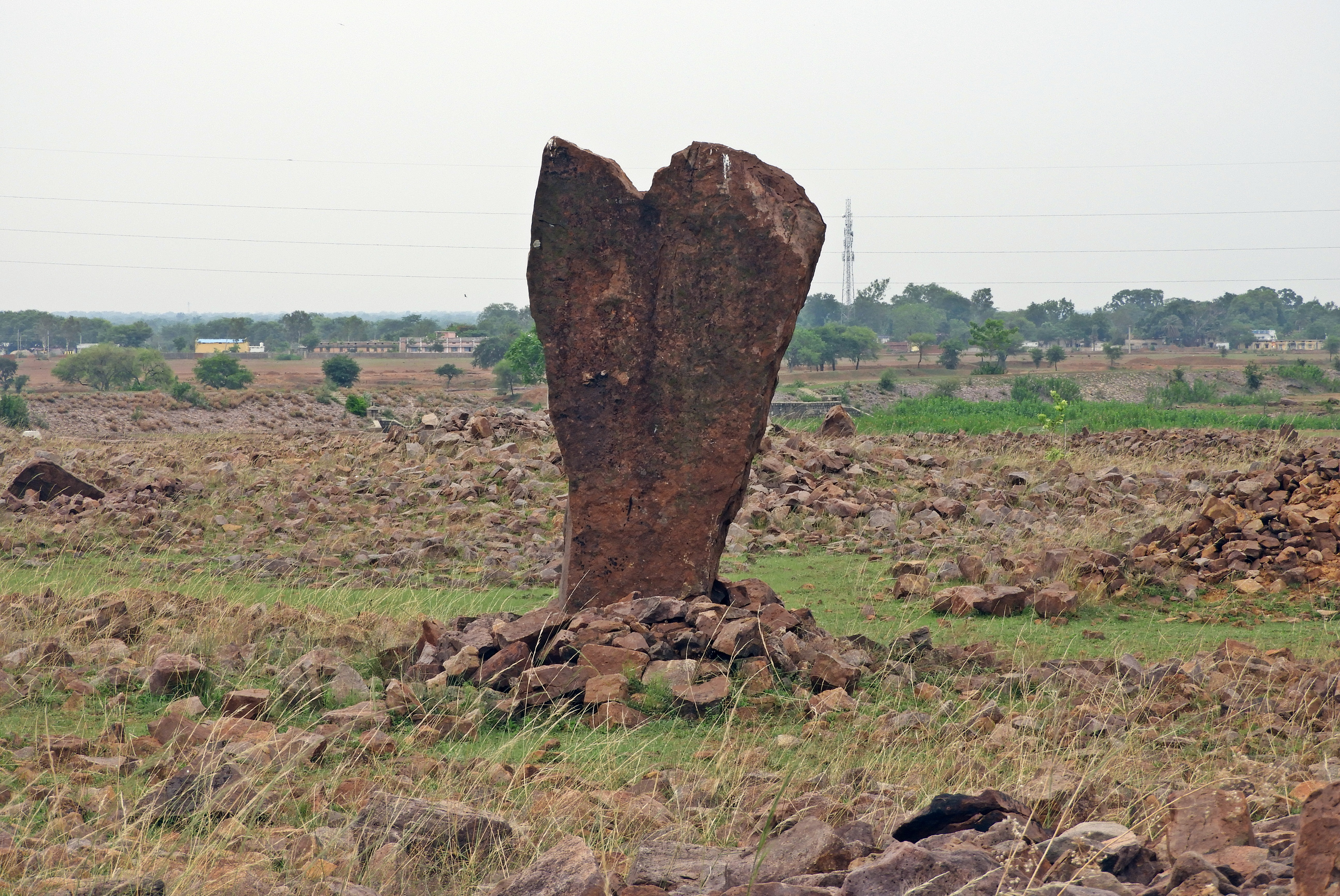
Megalithic monument in Karkabhat megalithic burial site near Balod, Chhattisgarh

Neolithic settlements have been found in many parts of India. The earliest clear evidence of the megalithic urn burials, discovered at various places in Tamil Nadu, date back to 1000 BCE. The most notable megalithic urn was discovered in Adichanallur, 24 kilometres (15 mi) from Tirunelveli, where archaeologists from the Archaeological Survey of India unearthed 12 urns containing human skulls, skeletons and bones, husks, grains of charred rice and Neolithic celts, confirming the presence of the Neolithic period 2800 years ago.

The unearthed local and foreign antiquities (of art, architecture, customs, and rituals) depicted by the engravings on pottery and other artifacts, indicate that the prehistoric people of the Burzahom established contact with Central Asia and South West Asia, and had links to the Gangetic plains and peninsular India.

Megalithic burial sites have been found scattered all over the subcontinent. The Neolithic period lasted up until 3300 BCE, overlapping with the following Early Harappan (Chalcolithic to Early Bronze Age) period. One of the earliest Neolithic sites in India is Lahuradewa in the Middle Ganga region and Jhusi near the confluence of the Ganga and Yamuna rivers, both dating to around the 7th millennium BCE.

== Indus Valley Civilisation (2600 BCE – 1900 BCE) ==
The Indus Valley Civilisation covered a large area around and beyond the Indus River basin in the late Bronze Age of India. In its mature phase, from about 2600 to 1900 BCE, the civilisation developed several cities marked by great uniformity within and between sites, including Harappa, Lothal, and the UNESCO World Heritage Site Mohenjo-daro.

Planning of Indus Valley Civilisation cities

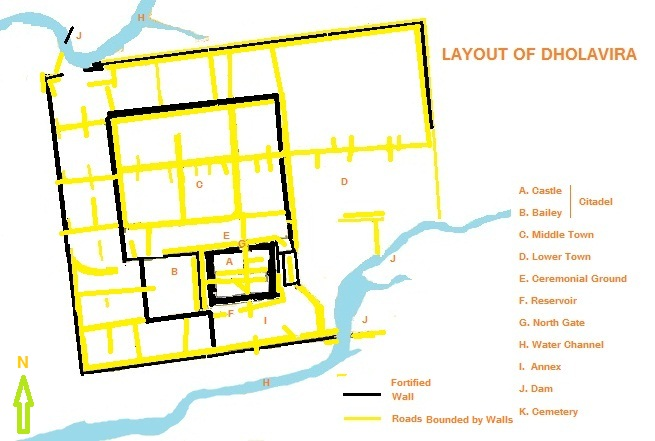
Layout of Dholavira

Layout of Kalibangan

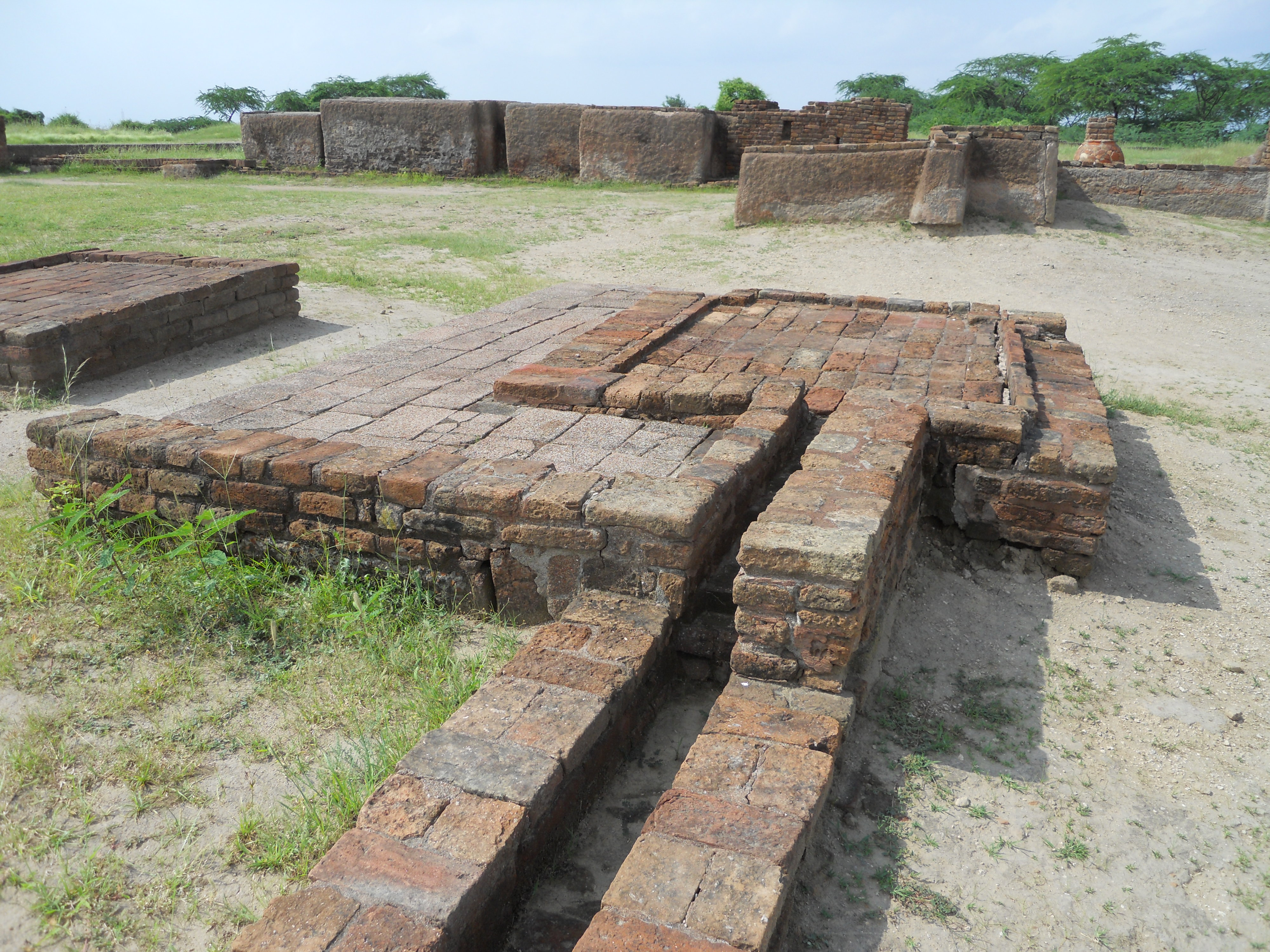
The drainage system at Lothal

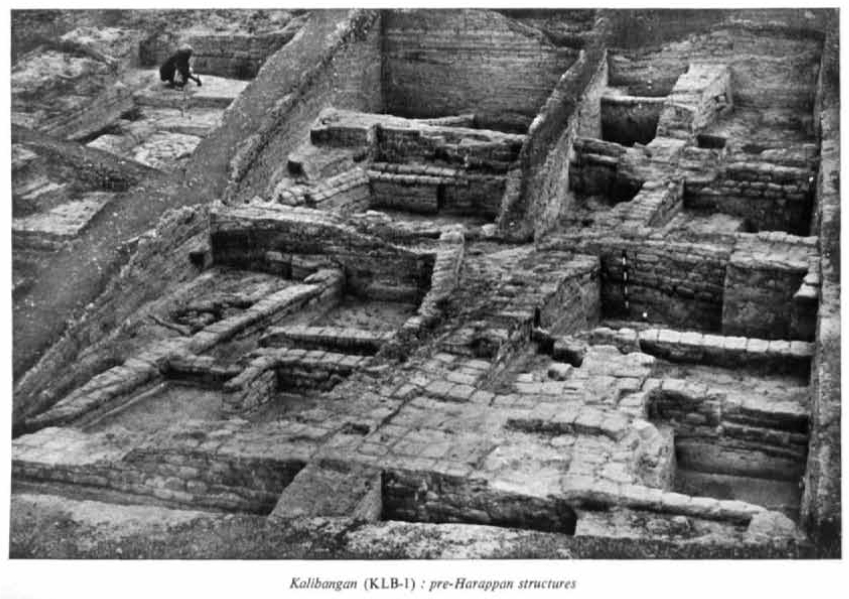
Kalibangan pre-Harappan structures

The civic and town planning and the engineering of these cities are deemed remarkable, but the building designs are "of a startling utilitarian character". There are granaries, drains, water-courses and tanks, but neither palaces nor temples have been identified, though cities have a central raised and fortified "citadel". Mohenjo-daro has wells which may be the predecessors of the stepwell. As many as 700 wells have been discovered in just one section of the city, leading scholars to believe that 'cylindrical brick lined wells' were invented by the Indus Valley Civilisation.

Architectural decoration is extremely minimal, though there are "narrow pointed niches" inside some buildings. Most of the art found is in miniature forms like seals, and mainly in terracotta, but there are very few larger sculptures of figures. In most sites, fired mud-brick (not sun-baked as in Mesopotamia) is used exclusively as the building material, but a few sites, such as Dholavira, are in stone. Most houses have two storeys, and uniform sizes and plans. The large cities declined relatively quickly, for unknown reasons, so a less sophisticated village culture was left behind.

After the collapse of the Mature Harappan Period, some cities still remained urban and inhabited. Sites like Bet Dwarka in Gujarat, Kudwala (38.1 ha) in Cholistan, and Daimabad (20 Ha) in Maharashtra are considered urban. Daimabad (2000–1000 BC), developed a fortification wall with bastions in its Jorwe culture period (1400–1000 BC), and had public buildings, such as an elliptical temple and an apsidal temple. It also shows evidence of planning in the layout of rectangular houses, and streets or lanes, and planned streets. The area had risen to 50 hectares in with a population of 10,000 people. A 580-metre (1,900 ft) long protection wall dated 1500 BCE was found at Bet Dwarka which was believed to be damaged and submerged following a sea storm.

== 600 BCE – 250 CE ==
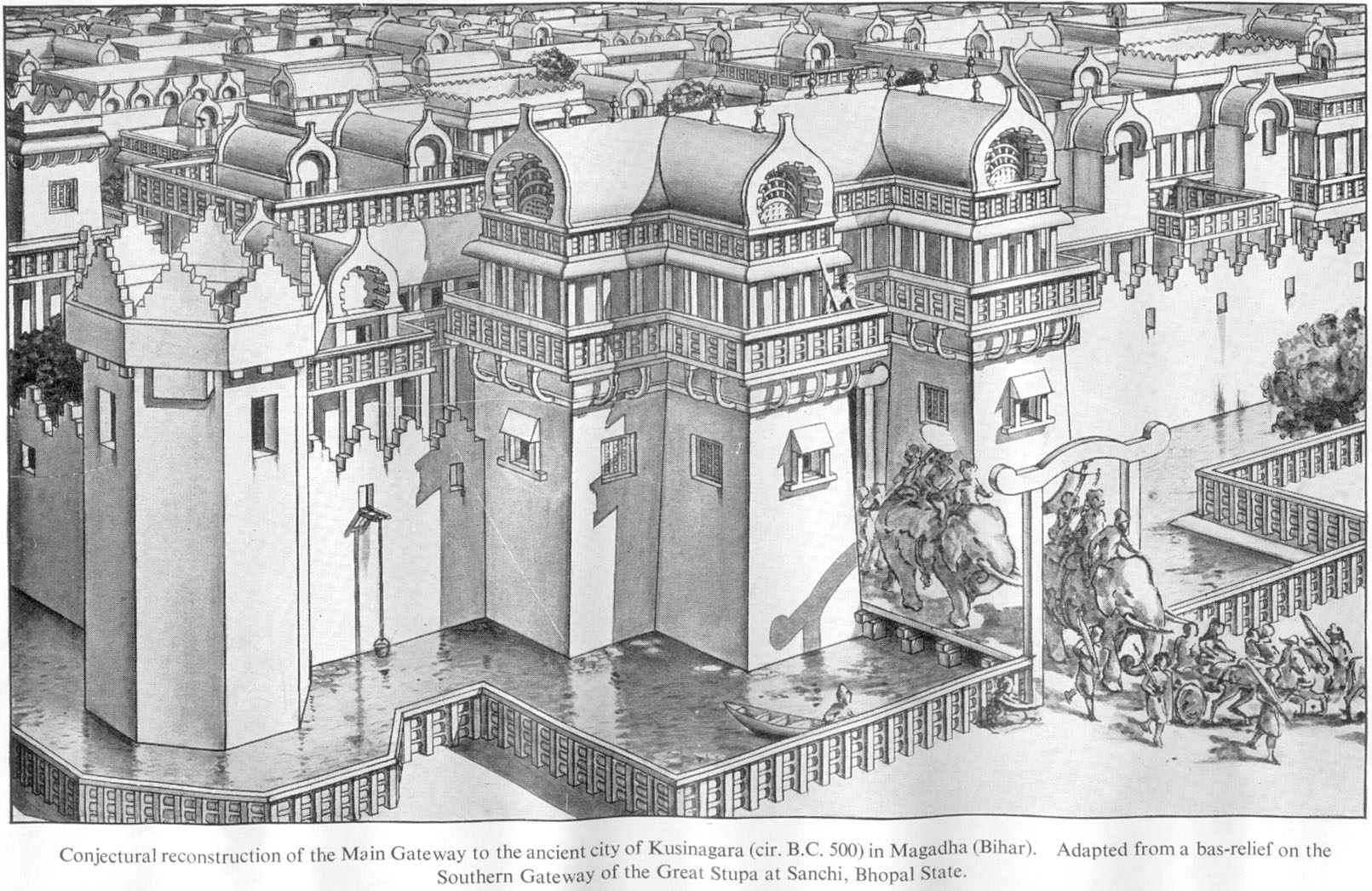
Conjectural reconstruction of the main gate of Kushinagar c. 500 BCE adapted from a relief at Sanchi

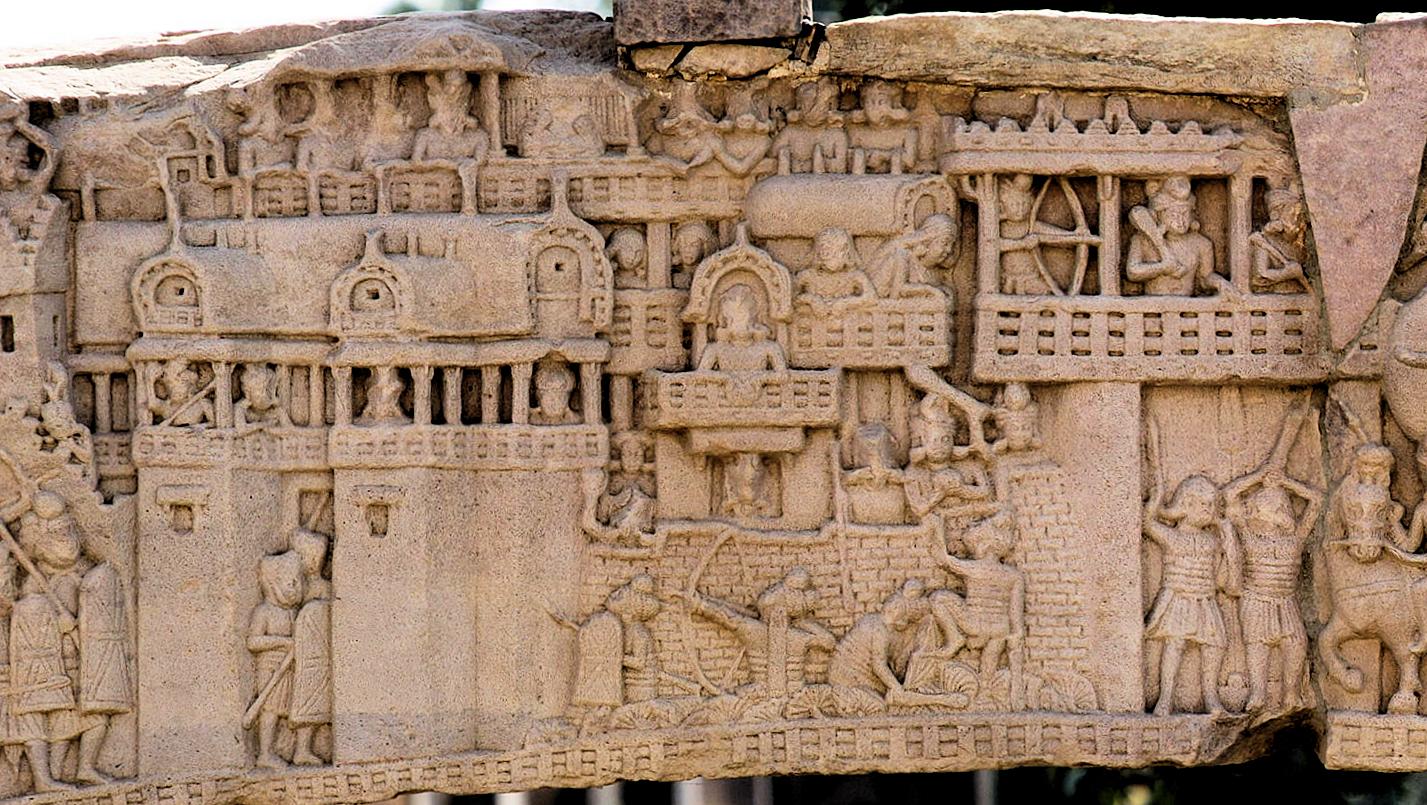
City of Kushinagar in the 5th century BCE according to a 1st-century BCE frieze in Sanchi Stupa 1 Southern Gate

Indian architecture after the Indus Valley Civilisation and around the Maurya Empire (321 to 185 BCE), most likely used wood or recycled brick. Much of the remains discovered from this period onwards are of Indian rock-cut architecture, predominantly Buddhist.

Important features of the period's architecture include, walled and moated cities with large gates and multi-storied buildings, wooden chaitya arches for roofs, and further structures above solid storeys. The reliefs of Sanchi, dated to the 1st centuries BCE-CE, denote places such as Kushinagar or Rajagriha as splendid walled cities, as in the Royal cortege leaving Rajagriha or War over the Buddha's relics. These views of ancient Indian cities are relied on for the understanding of ancient Indian urban architecture.

In the case of the Mauryan capital Pataliputra (near modern-day Patna), we have Greek accounts, and that of Faxian. Megasthenes mentions 564 towers and 64 gates in the city walls. Modern excavations have uncovered a "massive palisade of teak beams held together with iron dowels". A huge apadana-like hall with eighty sandstone columns shows clear influence from contemporary Achaemenid Persia. The single massive sandstone Pataliputra capital shows clear Hellenistic features, reaching India via Persia. The famous Ashoka columns show great sophistication, and a variety of influences in their details. In both these cases a now-vanished Indian predecessor tradition in wood is likely.

== Gupta architecture ==
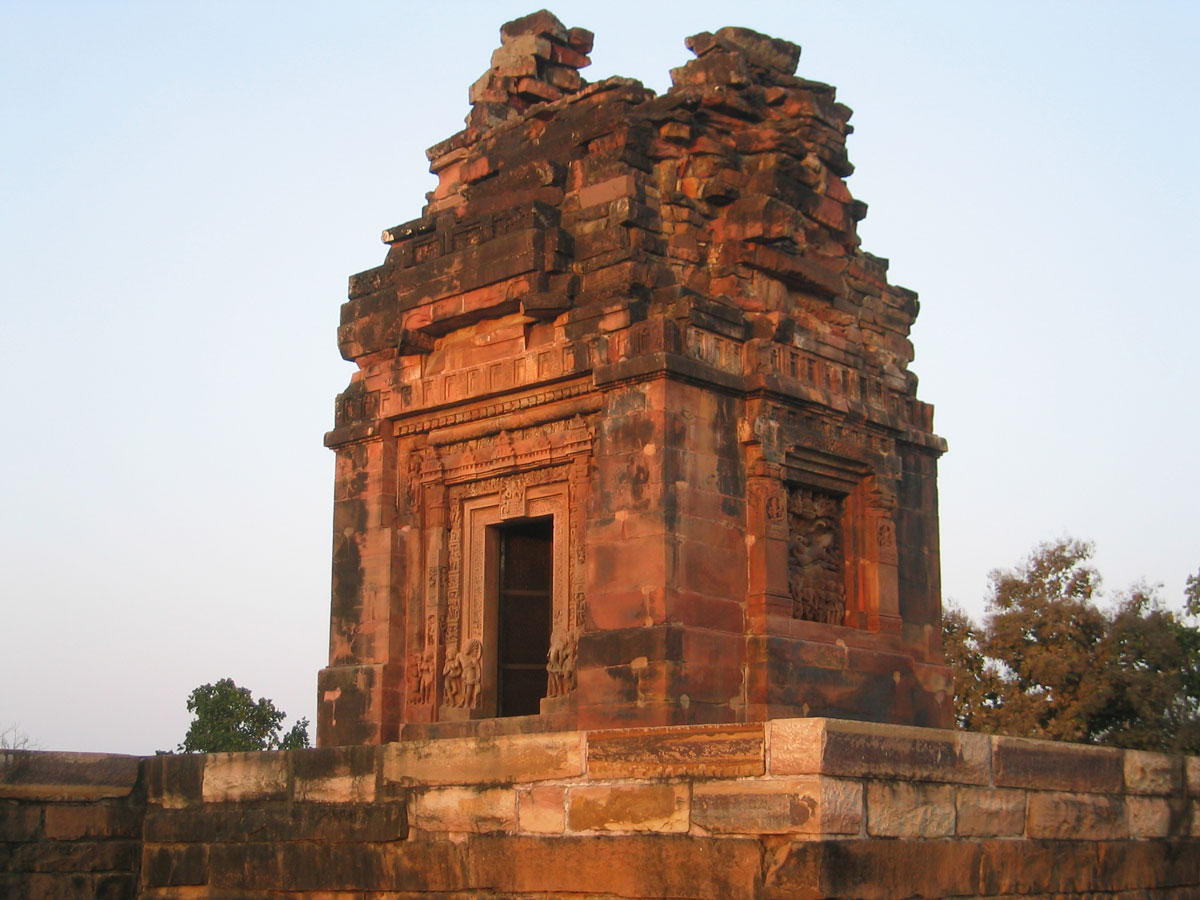
Dashavatara Temple, Deogarh is a Vishnu Hindu temple built during the early 6th century, near the end of the Gupta period.

The Gupta period chiefly represented a hiatus in Indian rock-cut architecture; the first wave of construction was completed before the empire was assembled, and the second wave began in the late 5th century, after its end. For example, an early group of the Ajanta Caves was crafted by 220 CE and a later group was made around 460 CE. Nonetheless, most of the first surviving free-standing structures in India are accredited to the Gupta period, in particular, the beginnings of Hindu temple architecture. As Milo Beach writes, "Under the Guptas, India was quick to join the rest of the medieval world in a passion for housing precious objects in stylized architectural frameworks", the "precious objects" primarily suggesting the icons of gods.

The caves at Ajanta, including Elephanta and Ellora (respectively Buddhist, Hindu, mixed, and Jain) were produced under other dynasties in Central India. Ellora was made after the Gupta period, yet they primarily reflect the monumentality and balance of Guptan style. The Ajanta Caves contain the most significant and mature survivals of painting and the periods, mainly in palace paintings. The Hindu Udayagiri Caves record connections with the dynasty and its ministers, and the Dashavatara Temple at Deogarh, one of the earliest to survive, showcases important sculpture.

North Indian Hindu temples that have survived after the 5th century Udayagiri Caves in Madhya Pradesh include those at Tigawa (early 5th century), Sanchi Temple 17 (similar, but respectively Hindu and Buddhist), Deogarh, Parvati Temple, Nachna (465), Bhitargaon, the largest Gupta brick temple to survive, and Lakshman Brick Temple, Sirpur (600–625). Gop Temple in Gujarat (c. 550 or later) is an oddity, with no surviving close comparator.

There are a number of broad models of Guptan-style temples, however, the most common plan exemplifies small but massively built stone prostyle buildings with a sanctuary and a columned porch, apparent at Tigawa and Sanchi Temple 17 and continued today. Both temples have flat roofs over the sanctuary, which would become uncommon by about the 8th century, as seen in the design of the Mahabodhi Temple, Bhitargaon, Deogarh and Gop, with high superstructures of different shapes. The Chejarla Kapoteswara temple further demonstrates the continuance of free-standing chaitya-hall temples with barrel roofs, with many smaller wooden examples.

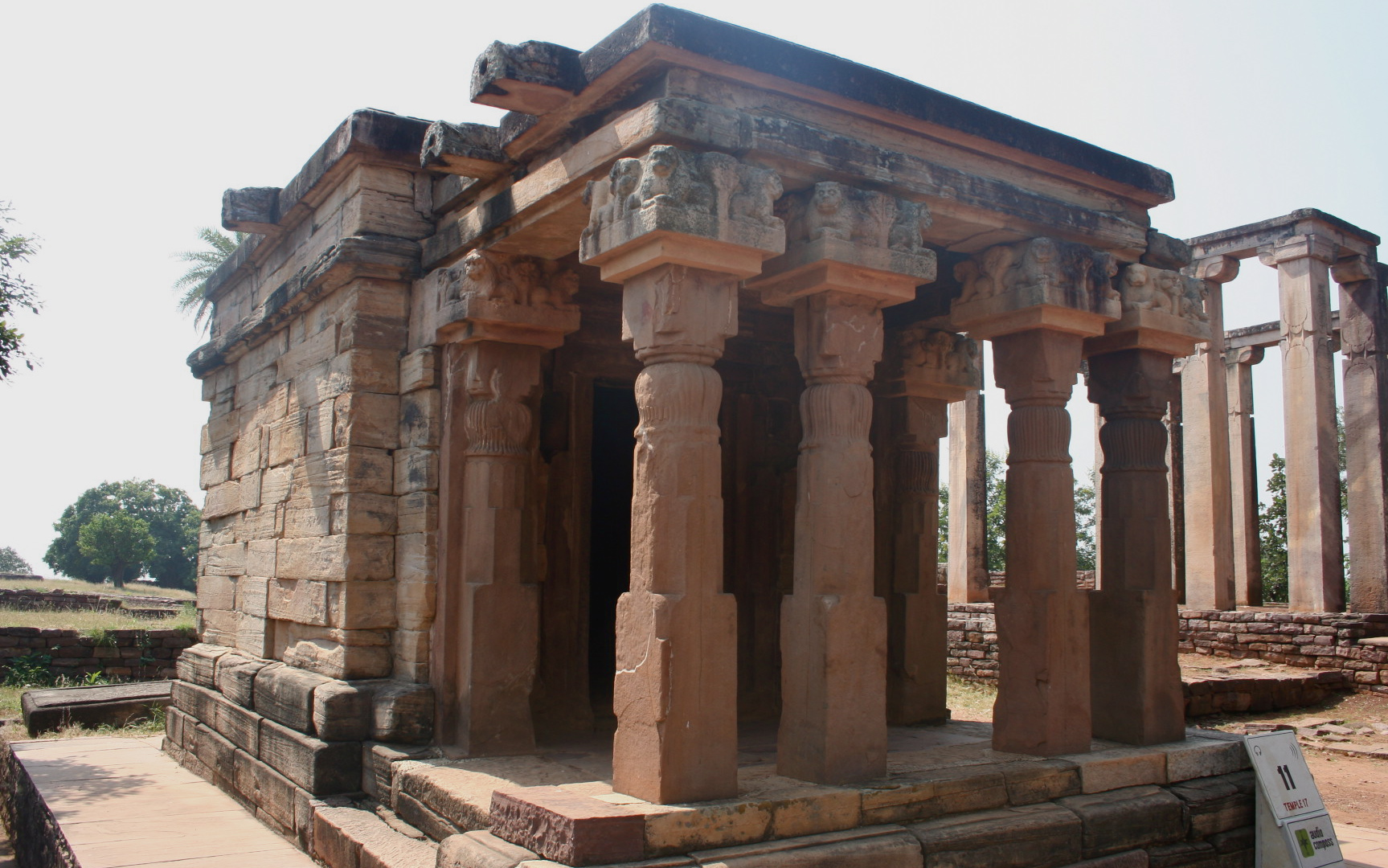
A tetrastyle prostyle Gupta period temple at Sanchi beside the Apsidal hall with Maurya foundation. An example of Buddhist architecture from the 5th century.

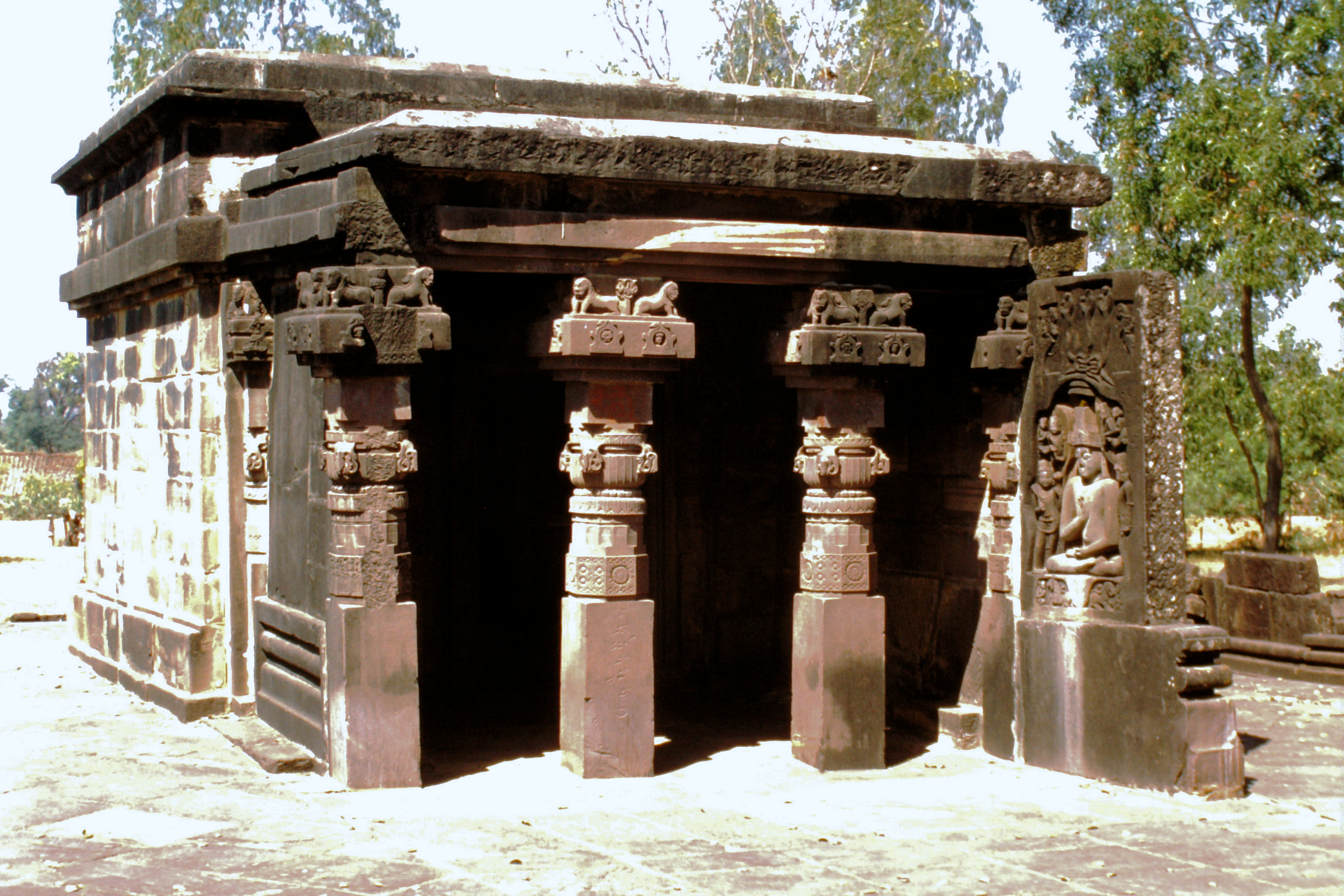
The Hindu Tigawa Temple from the early 5th century.

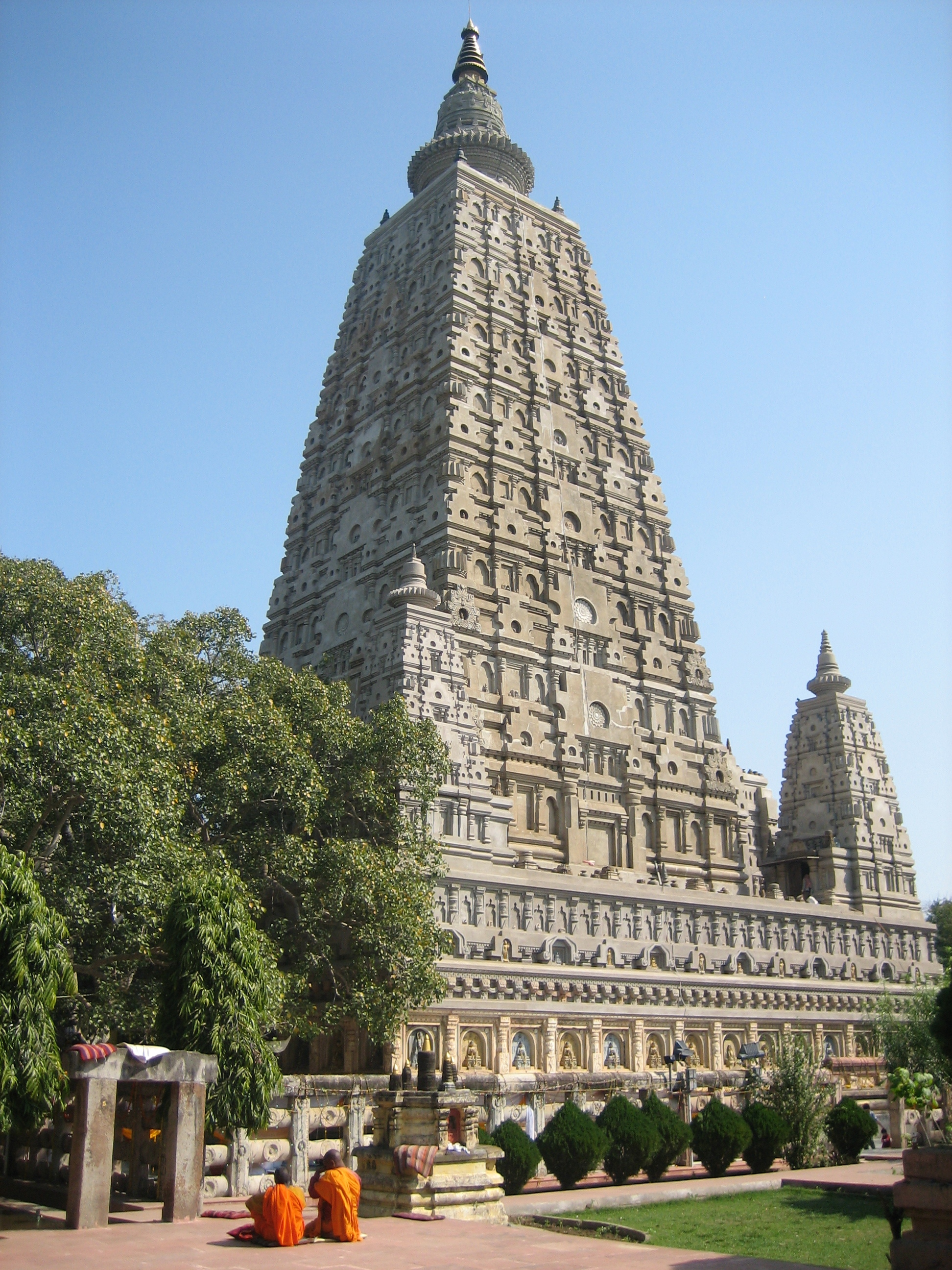
The current structure of the Mahabodhi Temple dates to the Gupta era in the 5th century. It marks the location where the Buddha is said to have attained enlightenment.

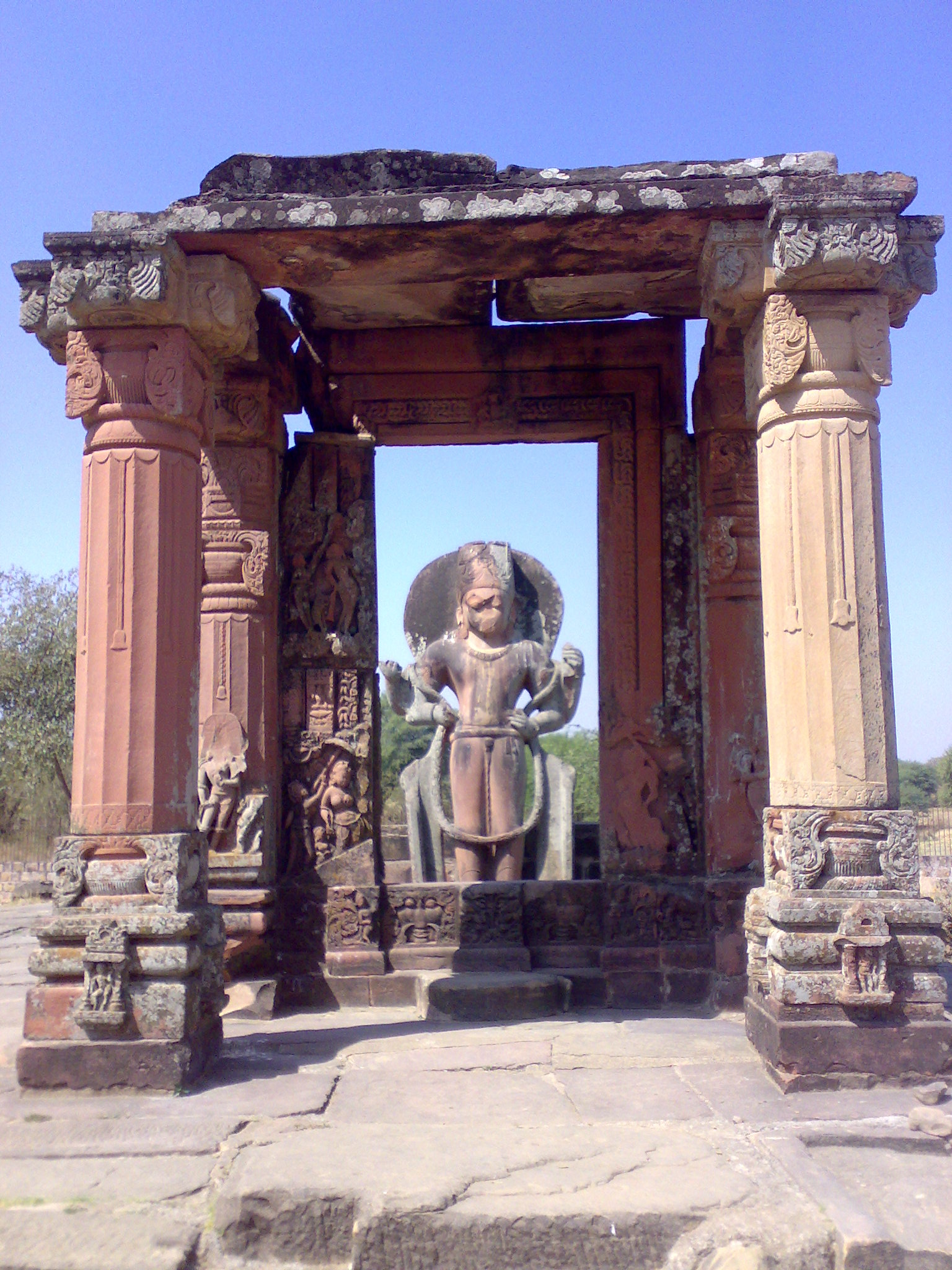
Vishnu temple in Eran from the 5th-6th century.

Pataini temple is a Jain temple built during the Gupta period in the 5th century.

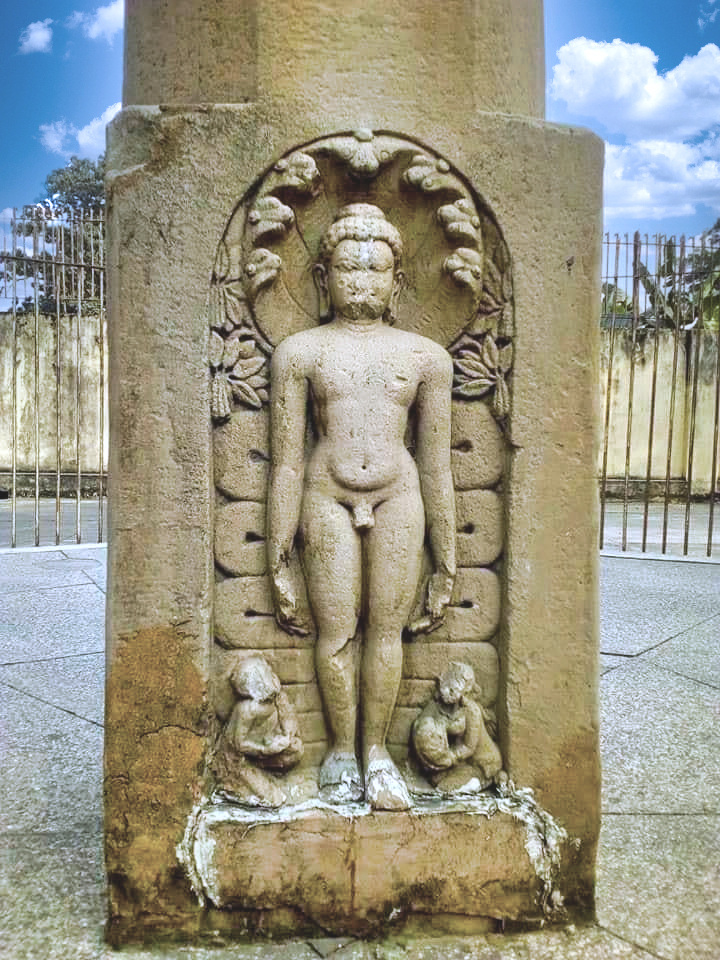
Relief of Jain tirthankara Parshvanatha on the Kahaum pillar, erected by a person named Madra during the reign of Skandagupta in 461.

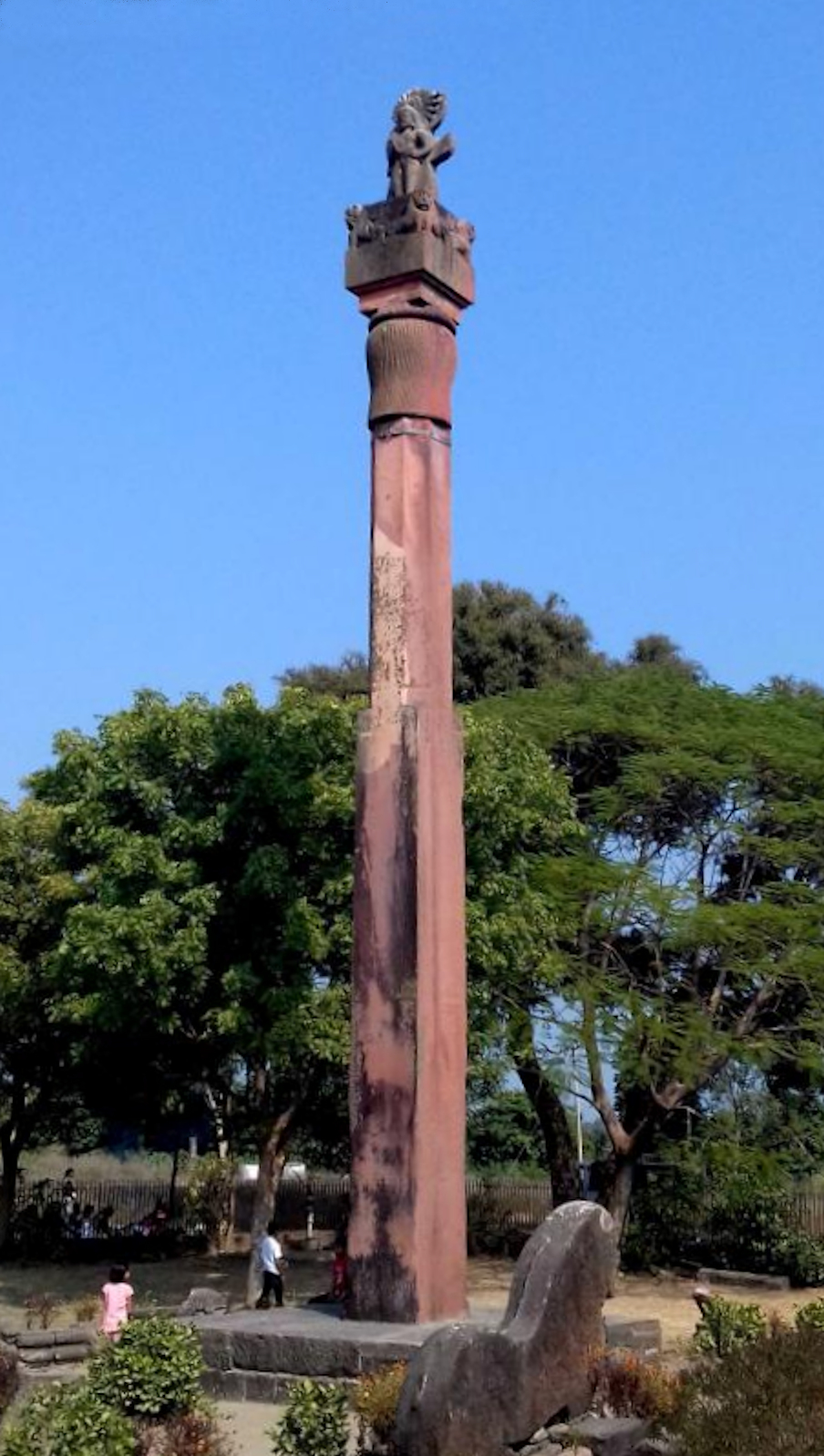
The Buddhagupta pillar at Eran (c.476–495)

== Hindu architecture ==
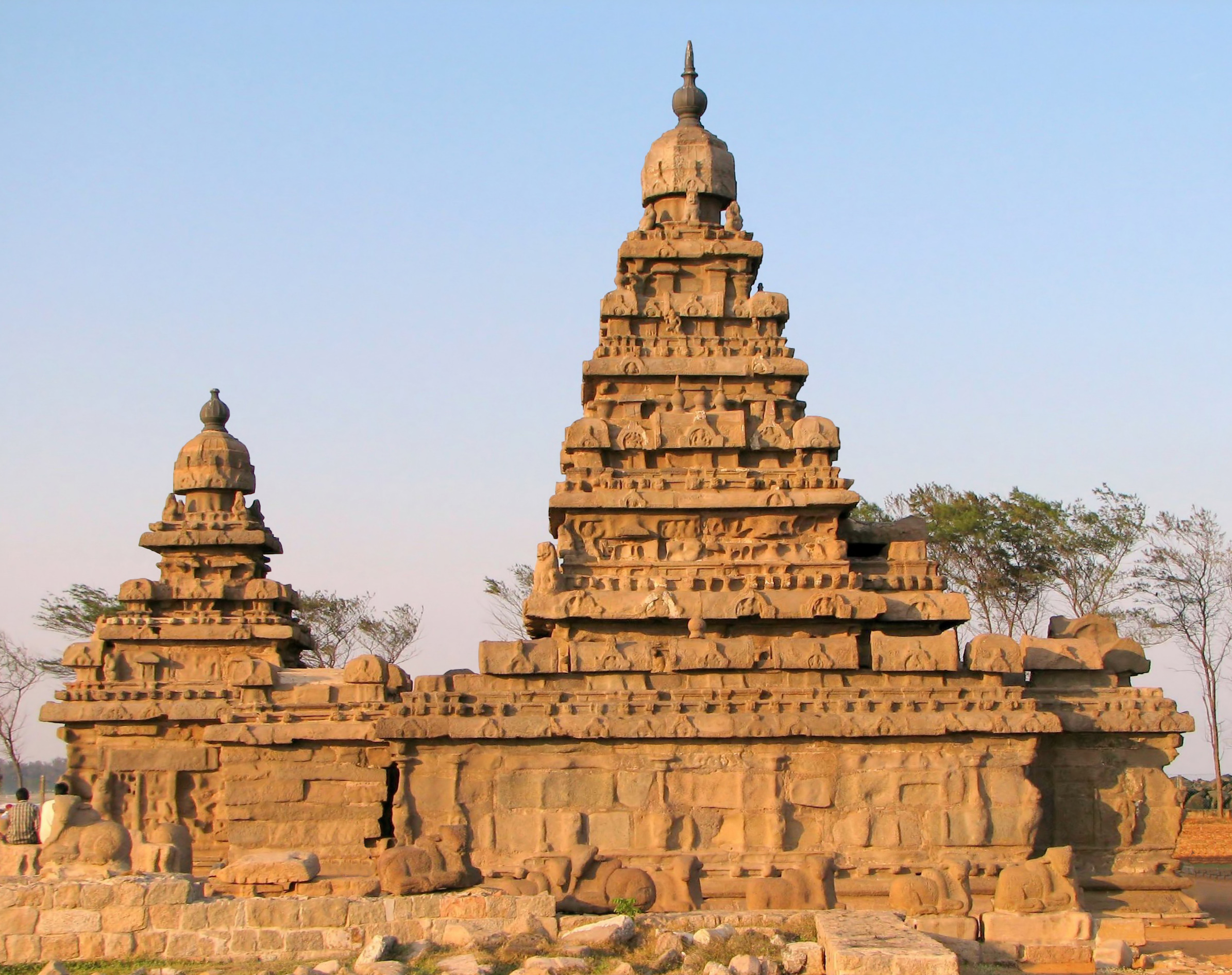
The rock-cut Shore Temple of the temples in Mahabalipuram, Tamil Nadu, 700–728 showing the typical dravida form of tower.

Architectural styles pertaining to Hinduism are often presented in the form of Hindu temples; whereas the visible stylistic forms of the temple vary greatly and have a complicated development, the basic elements of a Hindu temple remain the same across all periods and styles. The most essential feature is the inner sanctuary, the garbhagriha or "womb-chamber", where the primary murti of a deity is housed in. Around this chamber are other structures and buildings, at times covering several acres. On the exterior, the garbhagriha is crowned by a tower-like shikhara, also called the vimana in the south. The temple may include an ambulatory for parikrama (circumambulation), one or more mandapas or congregation halls, and sometimes an antarala antechamber and porch between the garbhagriha and mandapa.

Temple architectural styles

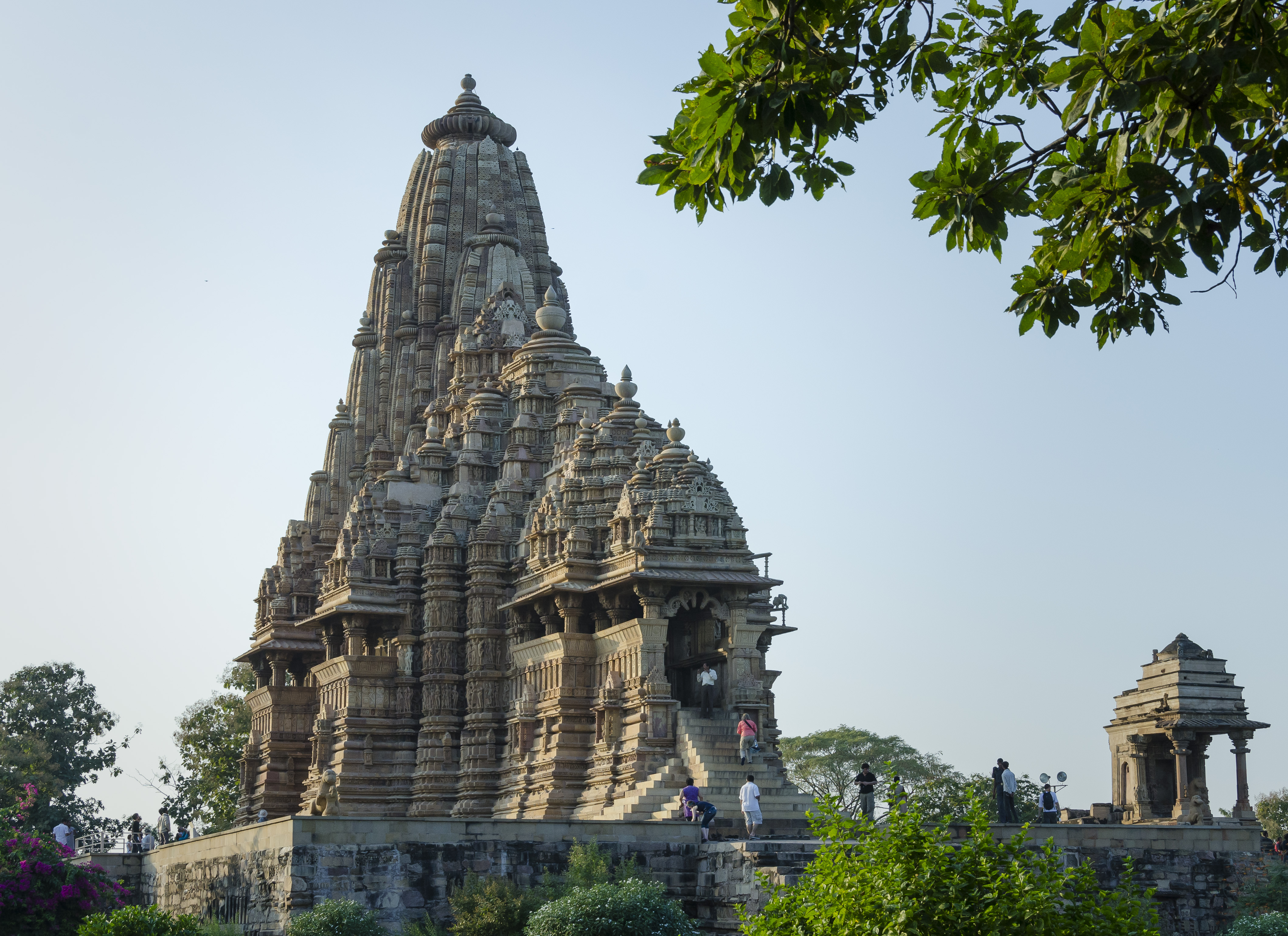
Kandariya Mahadeva Temple, Nagara Style

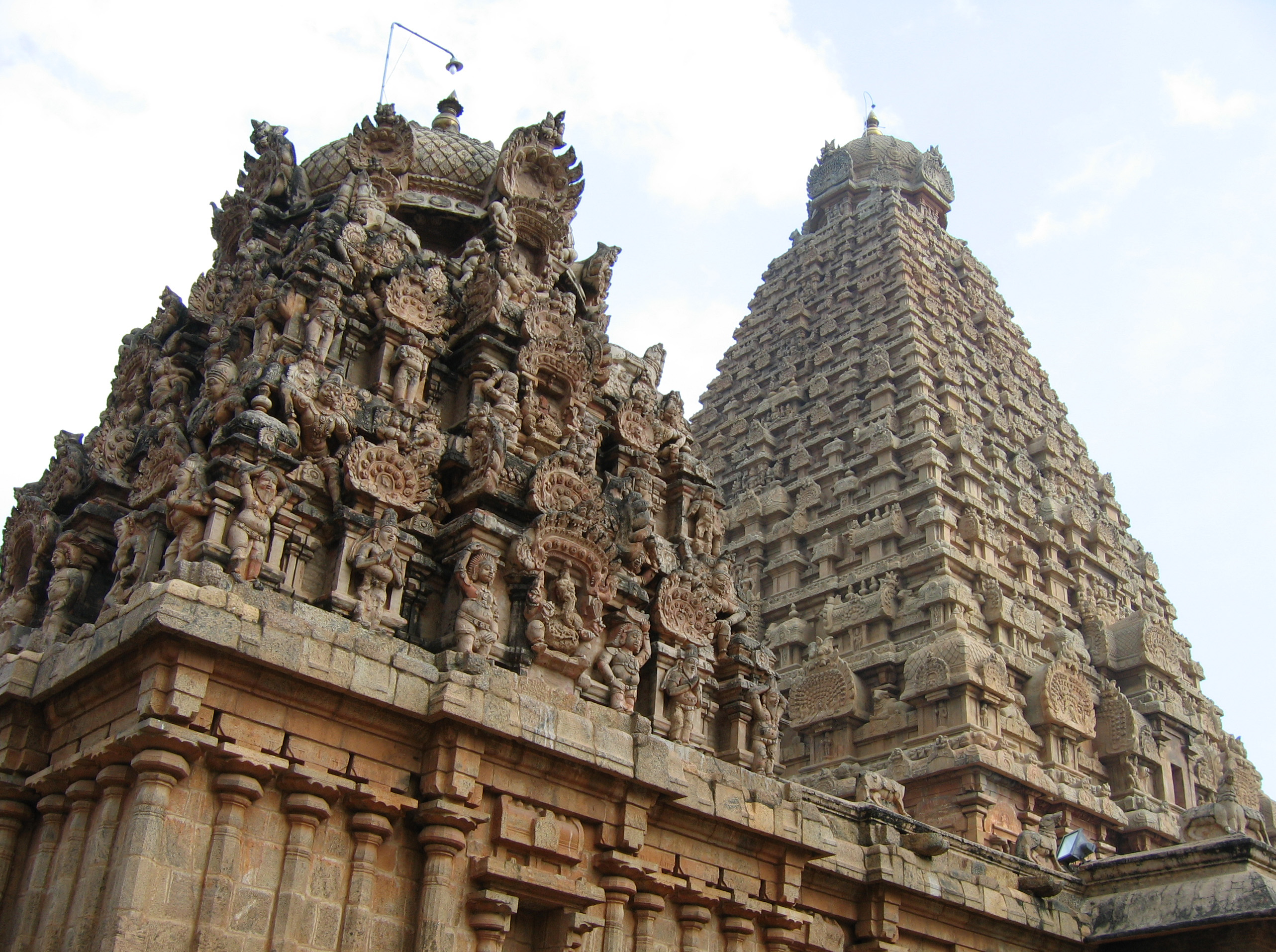
Brihadisvara Temple, Dravida Style

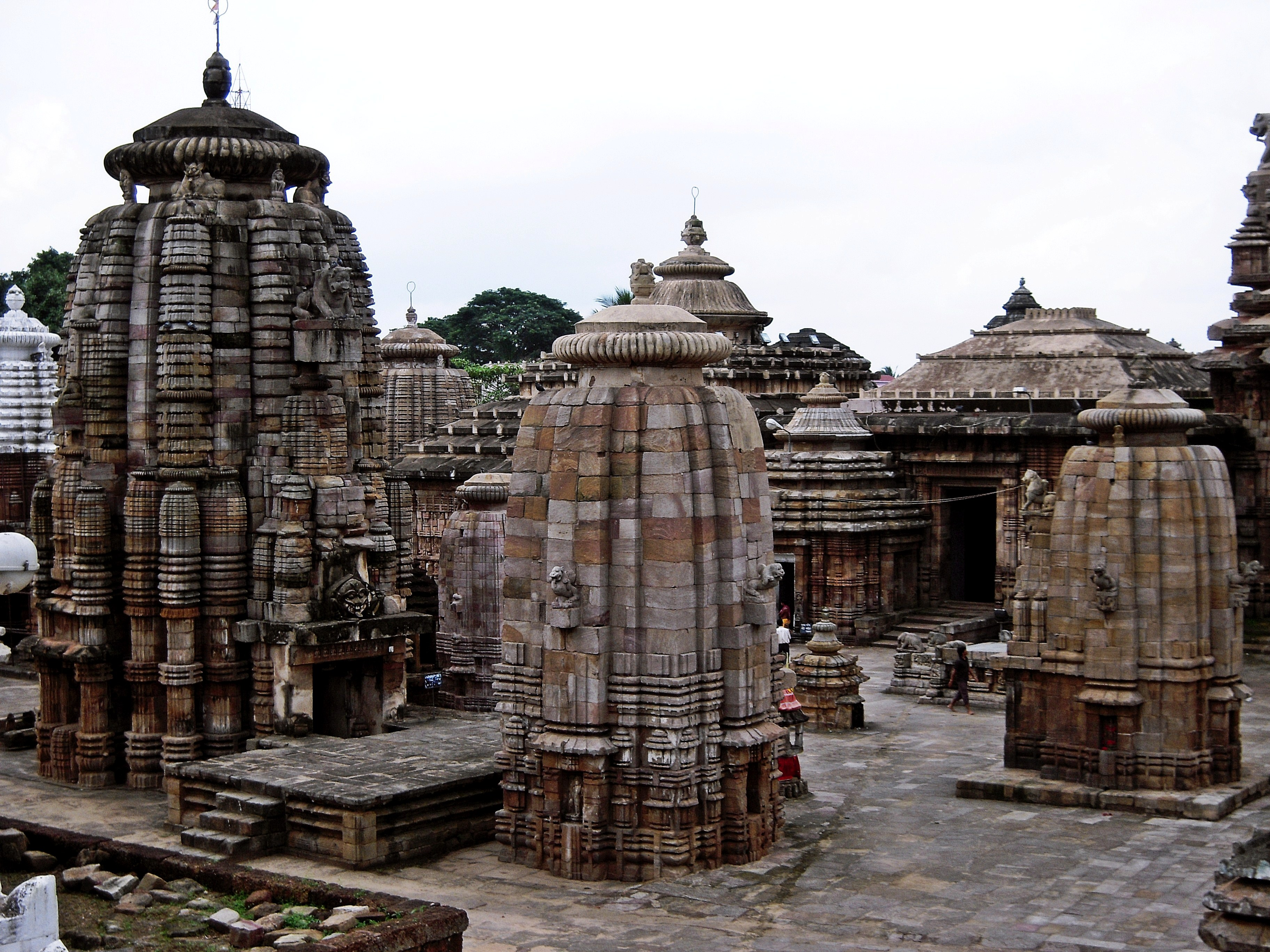
Lingaraja Temple, Kalinga Style

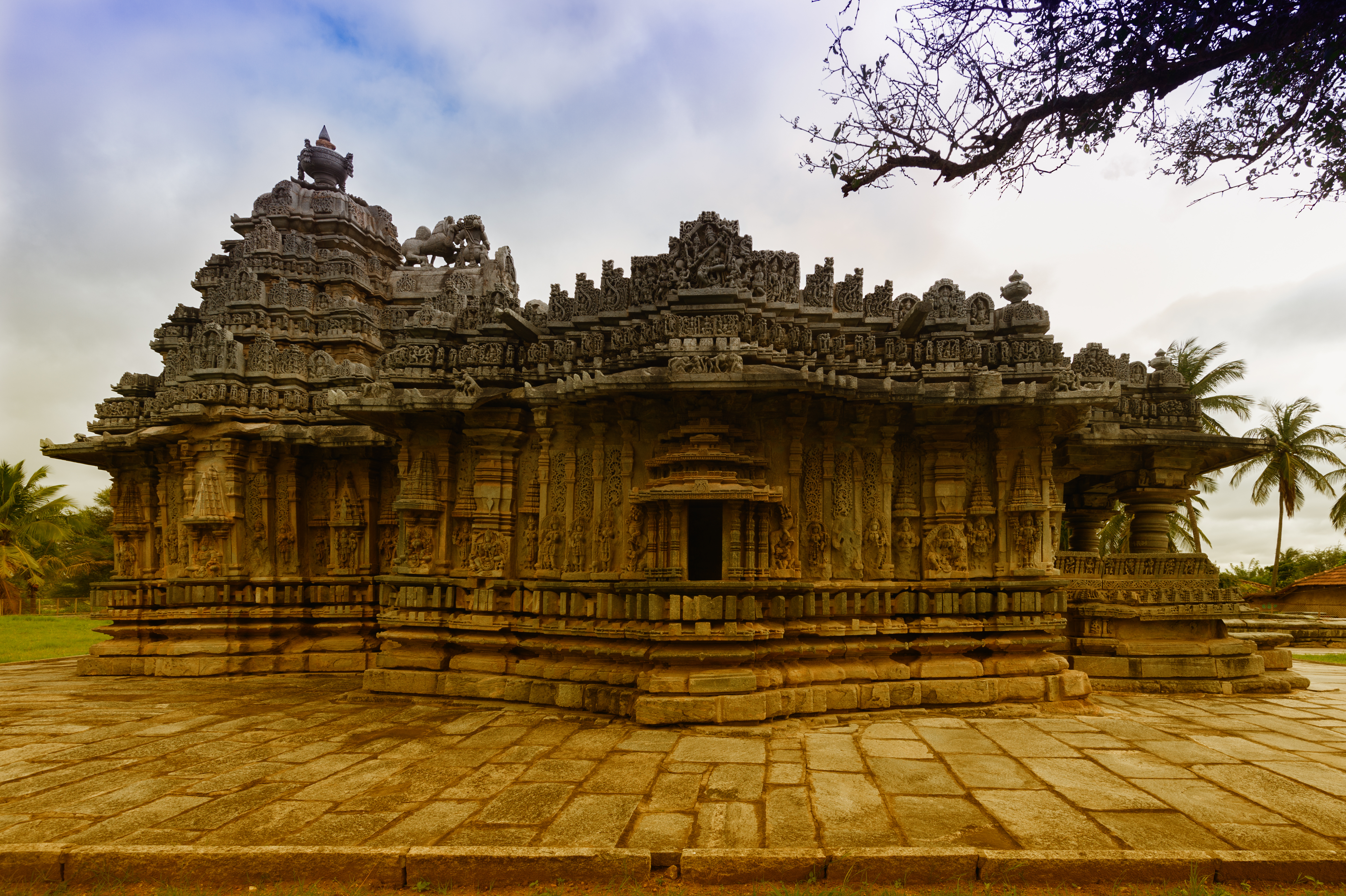
Nageshswara Temple, Vesara Style

Larger temples may include more shrines or buildings, either connected together or detached, with smaller temples in the compound. The entire temple compound is usually enclosed by a wall, and at times, raised on a plinth (adhiṣṭhāna). Large areas of the structure are often decorated with carving, including figurative images of deities and other religious figures.

By the 7th century CE, most key features of the Hindu temple were established in theoretical texts on temple architecture and building methods. Three styles of temple were identified: nagara, dravida and vesara. The styles were sometimes mixed, and not yet associated with specific regions in India. For example, in Karnataka, the group of 7th- and 8th-century temples at Pattadakal famously mixes forms later associated with both north and south, as does that at Aihole, which still includes apsidal chaitya hall-type plans.

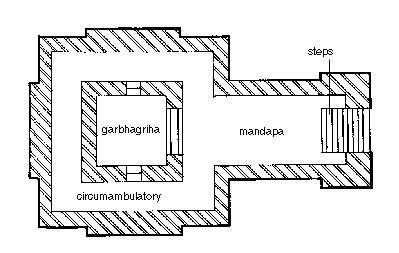
Hindu Temple basic floor design

Nagara commonly refers to North Indian temple styles, most easily recognised by a high and curving shikhara over the sanctuary. Dravida or Dravidian architecture is the broad South Indian style, possessing a lower superstructure over the sanctuary. Instead, the structure has a straight profile, rising in a series of terraces to form a decorated pyramid. Today, this is often dwarfed in larger temples by the far larger gopuram outer gateways, a much later development. The ancient term vesara is also used to describe a temple style with characteristics of both the northern and southern traditions. These attributes come from the Deccan and other fairly central parts of India. Although disagreement stands on the exact period and styles that vesara represents, the term is mainly assigned to the northern tradition, but are regarded as a kind of northern dravida by others.

=== Nagara architecture ===
==== Early ====
Excluding earlier structures in timber-based architecture, hardly any remains of Nagara Hindu temples exist from before the Gupta dynasty in the 4th century CE. The rock-cut Udayagiri Caves are among the most important early sites. The earliest preserved Hindu temples are simple cell-like stone temples, some rock-cut and others structural, as at Sanchi. By the 6th or 7th century, these evolved into high shikhara stone superstructures. However, there is inscriptional evidence, such as the ancient Gangadhara inscription from around 424, that towering temples predated the 6th or 7th century, and they were made from more perishable material. These temples have not survived.

The ninth century temple in Barakar shows a tall curving shikhara crowned by a large amalaka and is an example of the early Pala style. It is similar to contemporaneous temples of Odisha.

Early North Indian temples that have survived after the 5th century Udayagiri Caves in Madhya Pradesh include, Deogarh, Parvati Temple, Nachna (465 CE), Lalitpur District (c. 525), Lakshman Brick Temple, Sirpur (600–625 CE); Rajiv Lochan temple, and Rajim (7th-century CE).

Pre-7th century CE South Indian style stone temples have not survived. However, early South Indian temples that have survived, though in ruins, include the diverse styles at Mahabalipuram, from the 7th and 8th centuries. According to Meister, the Mahabalipuram temples are "monolithic models of a variety of formal structures all of which already can be said to typify a developed "Tamil Architecture" (South Indian) order". They suggest a tradition and a knowledge base existing in South India by the time of the early Chalukya and Pallava era when these were built. Other examples are found in Aihole and Pattadakal.

From between about the 7th and 13th centuries a large number of temples and their ruins have survived (though far fewer than once existed). Many regional styles developed, very often following political divisions, as large temples were typically built with royal patronage. In the north, Muslim invasions from the 11th century onwards reduced the building of temples, and saw the loss of many existing ones. The south also witnessed Hindu-Muslim conflict that affected the temples, but the region was relatively less affected than the north. In the late 14th century, the Hindu Vijayanagara Empire came to power and controlled much of South India. During this period, the distinctive very tall gopuram gatehouse actually a late development, from the 12th century or later, typically added to older large temples.

The recently constructed Ram Mandir in Ayodhya is constructed as per the Nagara style.

==== Later ====
North Indian temples showed increased elevation of the wall and elaborate spire by the 10th century. On the shikara, the oldest form, called latina, with wide shallow projections running up the sides, developed alternative forms with many smaller "spirelets" (urushringa). Two varieties of these are called sekhari, where the sub-spires extend vertically, and bhumija, where individual sub-spires are arrayed in rows and columns.

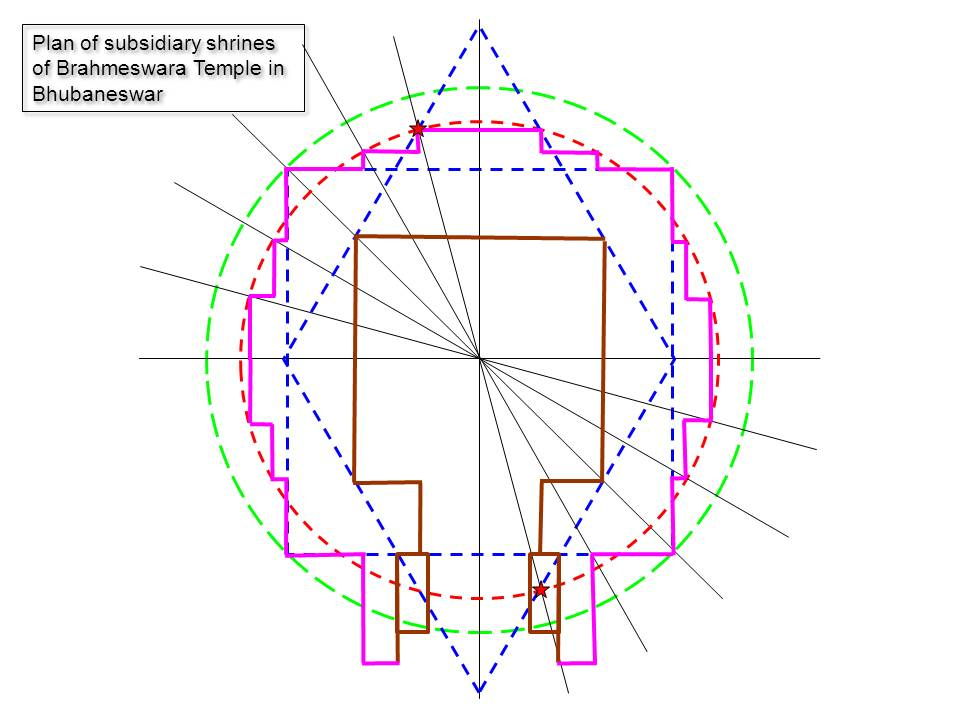
Drawing of a pancharatha (5 ratha) plan of subsidiary shrines of Brahmeswara Temple

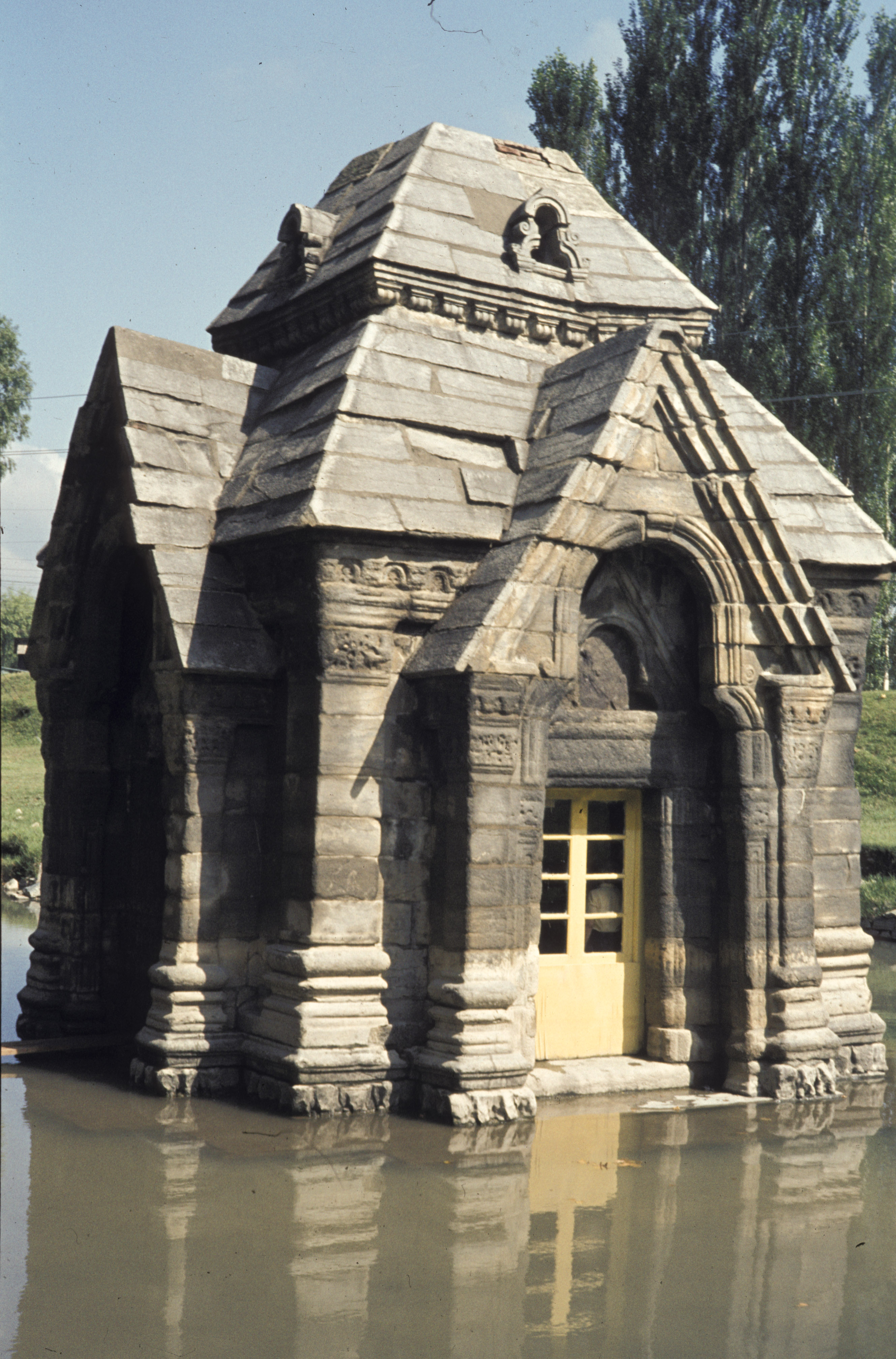
A Shiva Temple (built c. 8th–9th century CE) in Kashmir

Richly decorated temples—including the complex at Khajuraho—were constructed in Central India. Examples include the Lingaraja Temple at Bhubaneshwar in Odisha, Sun Temple at Konark in Odisha, Brihadeeswarar Temple at Thanjavur in Tamil Nadu. Indian traders brought Indian architecture to Southeast Asia through various trade routes.

Styles called vesara include the early Badami Chalukya Architecture, Western Chalukya architecture, and finally Hoysala architecture. Other regional styles include those of Bengal, Kashmir and other Himalayan areas, Karnataka, Kalinga architecture, and Māru-Gurjara architecture.

Hoysala architecture is the distinctive building style developed under the rule of the Hoysala Empire in the region historically known as Karnata, today's Karnataka, India, between the 11th and the 14th centuries. Large and small temples built during this era remain as examples of the Hoysala architectural style, including the Chennakesava Temple at Belur, the Hoysaleswara temple at Halebidu, and the Kesava Temple at Somanathapura. Other examples of fine Hoysala craftmanship are the temples at Belavadi, Amrithapura, and Nuggehalli. Study of the Hoysala architectural style has revealed a negligible Indo-Aryan influence while the impact of Southern Indian style is more distinct. A feature of Hoysala temple architecture is its attention to detail and skilled craftsmanship. The temples of Belur and Halebidu are proposed UNESCO World Heritage Sites. Approximately 100 Hoysala temples survive today.

==== Temples of Khajuraho ====
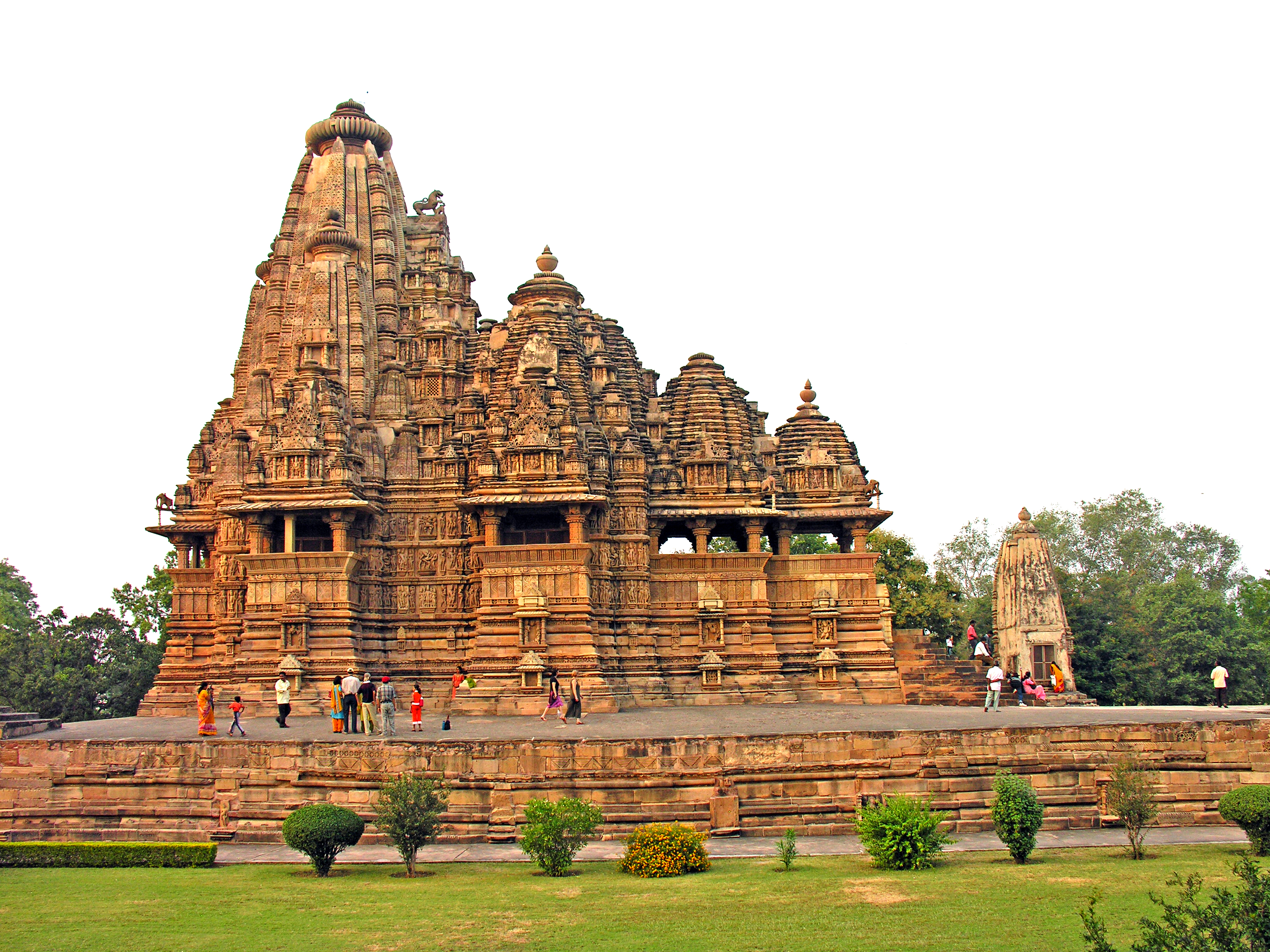
Vishvanatha Temple, part of the Khajuraho group of monuments

The Khajuraho Temples are a group of Hindu and Jain temples located in the town of Khajuraho, in the Chhatarpur District of Madhya Pradesh, India. The temples were built between 950 and 1050 by the Chandela dynasty.

Khajuraho is home to 25 sandstone temples in total, although only 20 remain mostly intact. The beautiful carvings on these temples, which show themes from Hindu mythology as well as other facets of everyday life in ancient India, are well-known. Both Hindu and Jain architectural influences may be seen in their design. The temples are split into three groups: the Western group, the Eastern group, and the Southern group. The Western group has the greatest popularity and draws the most tourists.

The Khajuraho Temples were declared a UNESCO World Heritage Site in 1986, and they continue to be a popular tourist attraction in India. According to UNESCO, the Khajuraho Temples "are a masterpiece of Indian art, with their unique architecture and stunning sculptures.

=== Dravidian style ===
Dravidian architectural elements

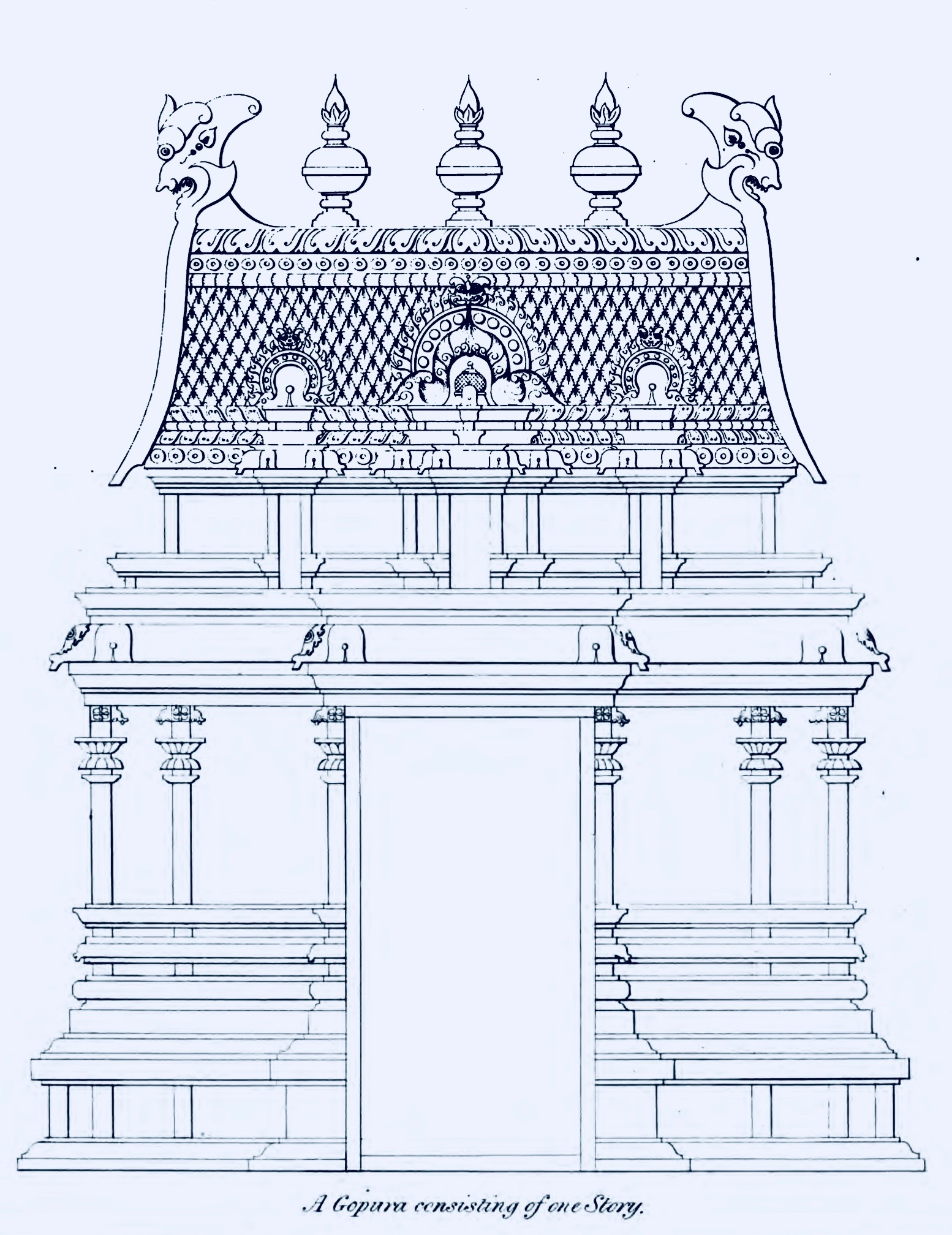
Single storey gopura (Dravidian architecture)

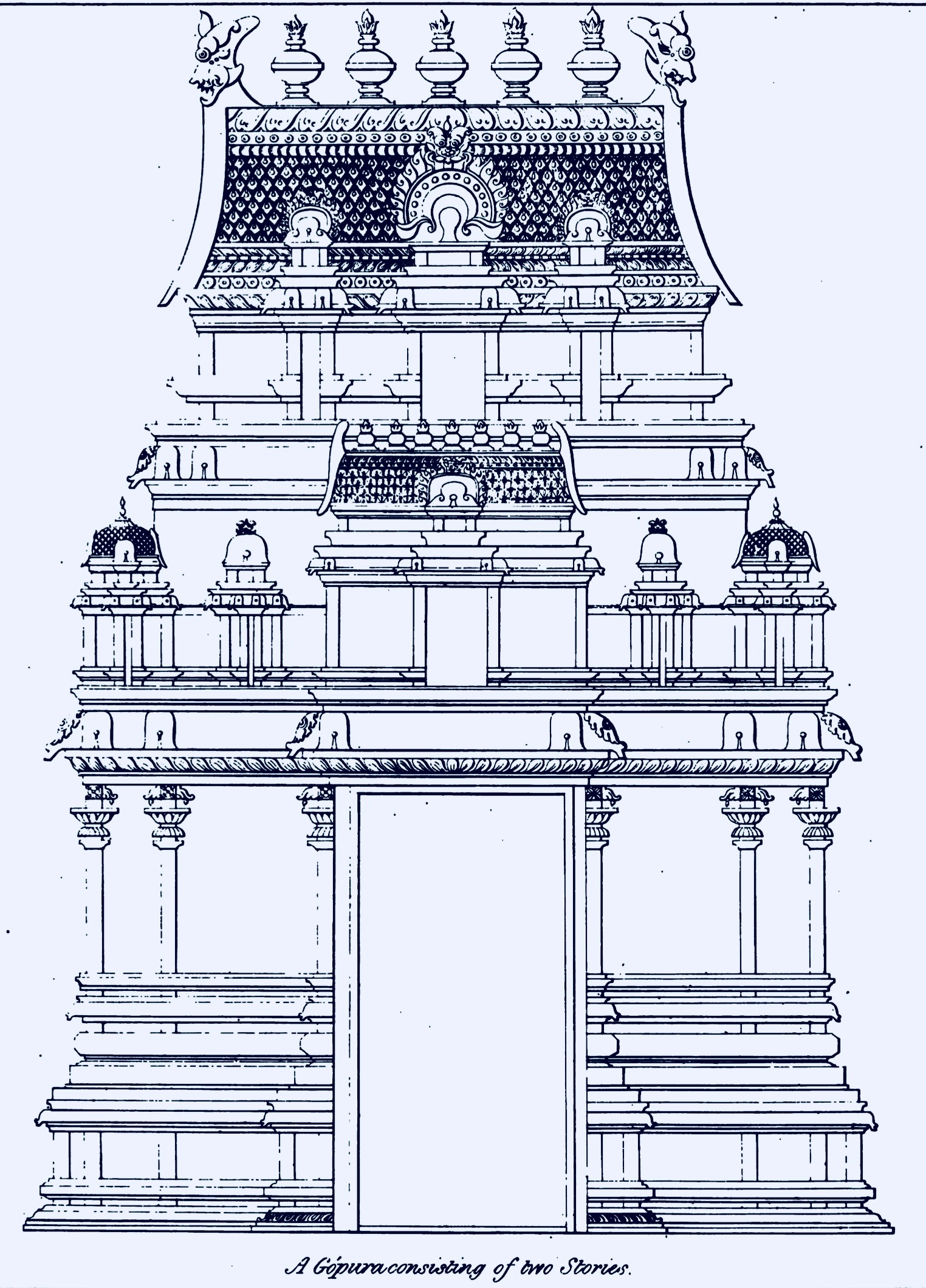
Two storey gopura (Dravidian architecture)

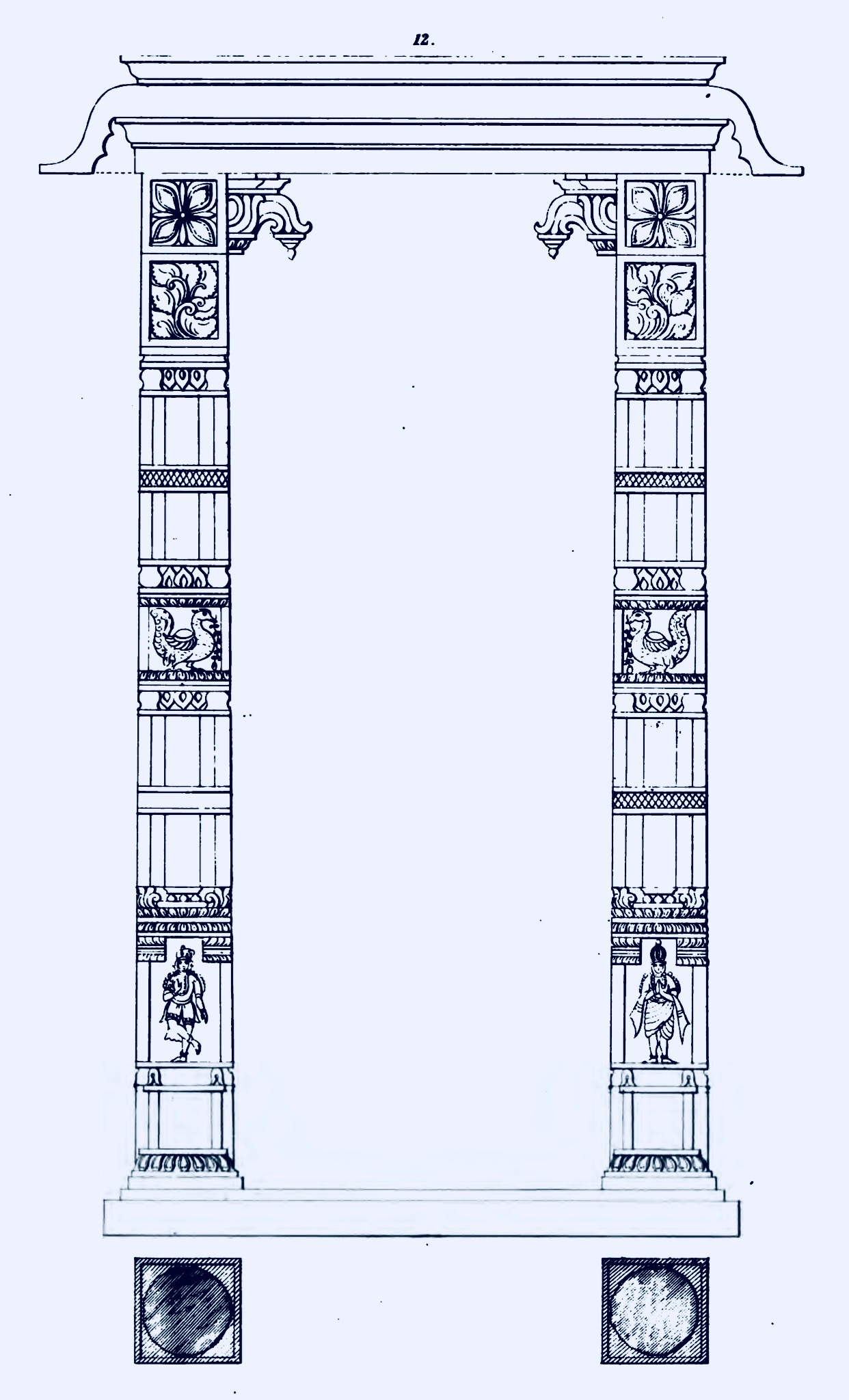
Pillar elements (shared by Nagara and Dravidian)

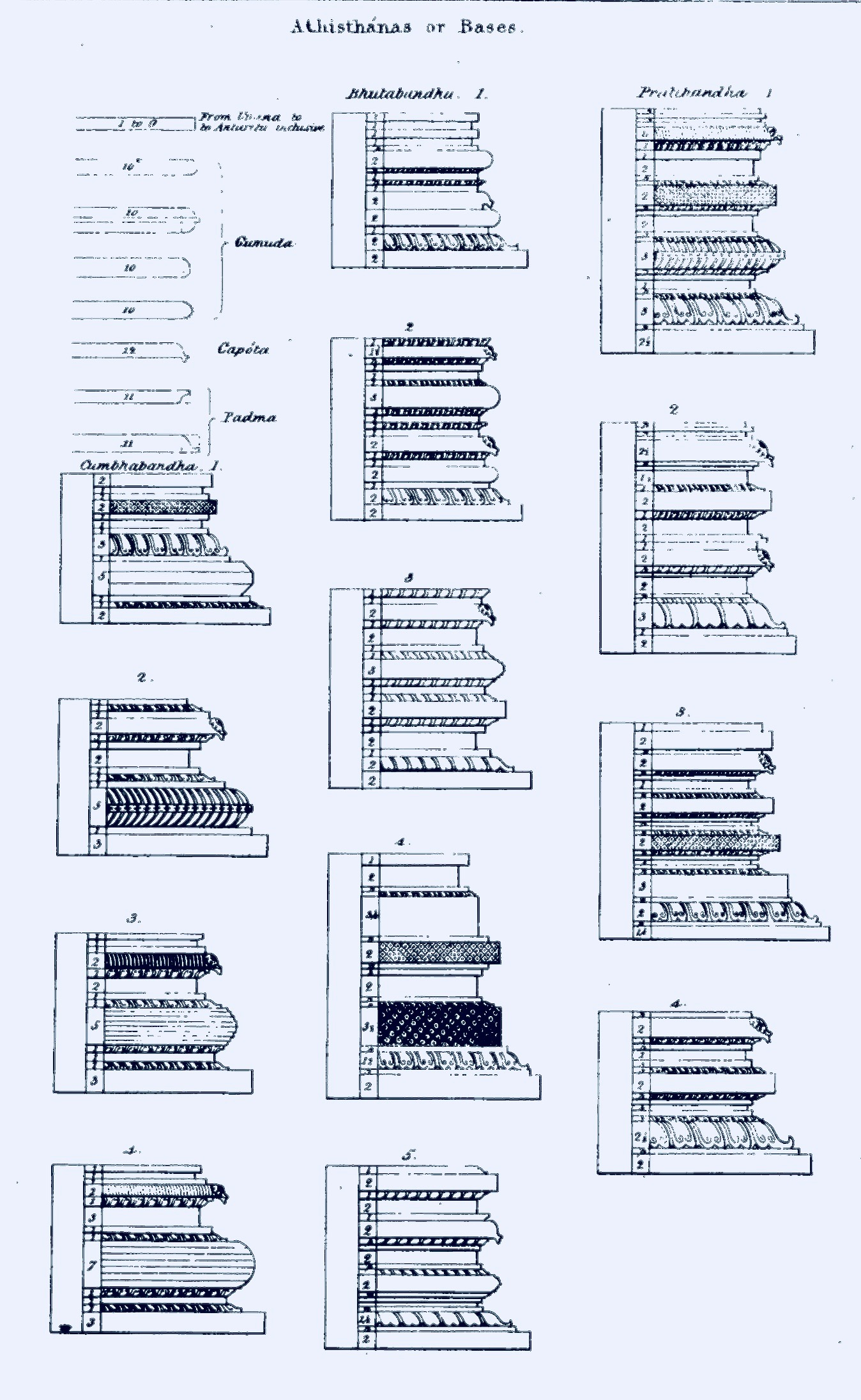
Athisthana architectural elements of a Hindu temple

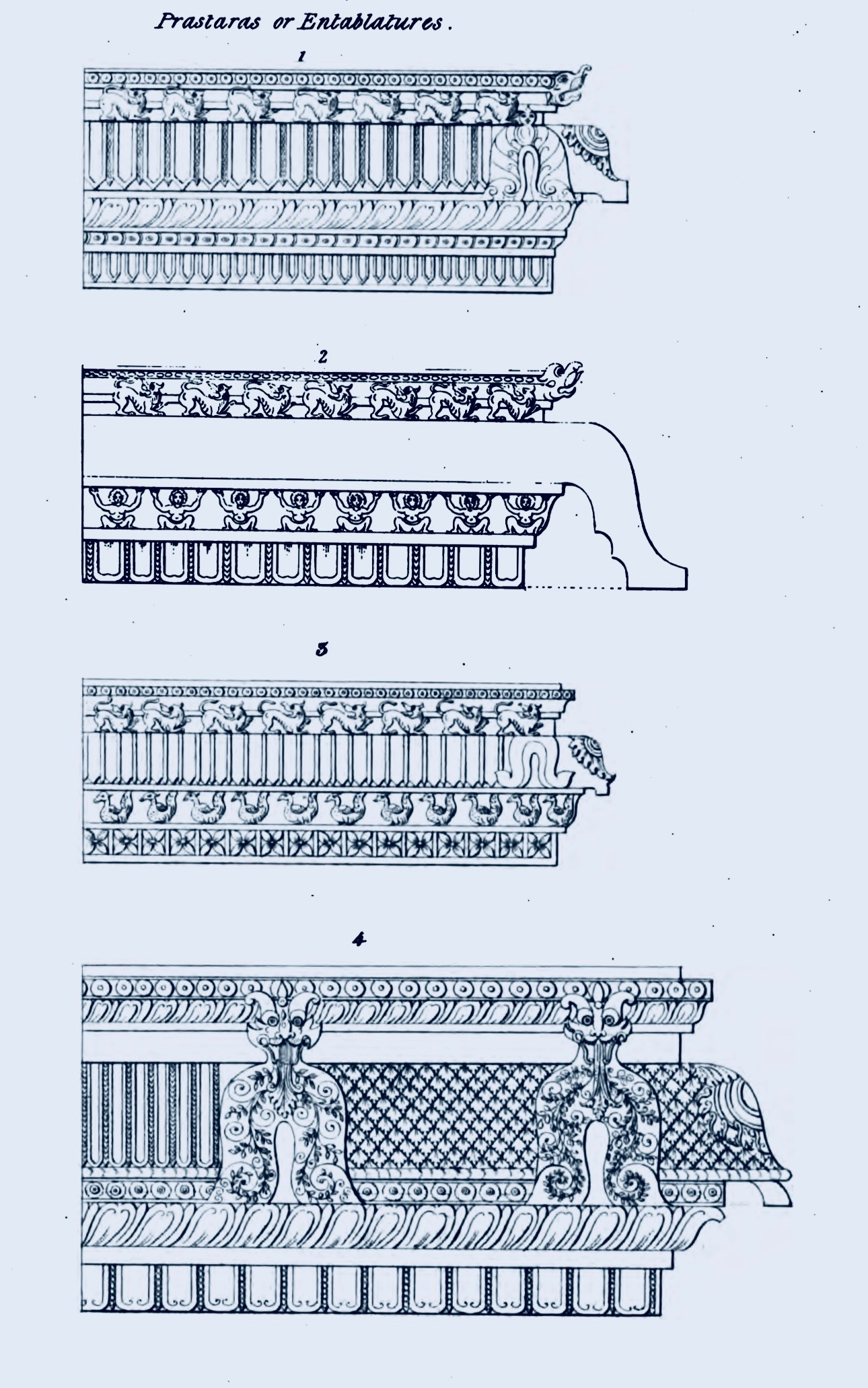
Entablature elements

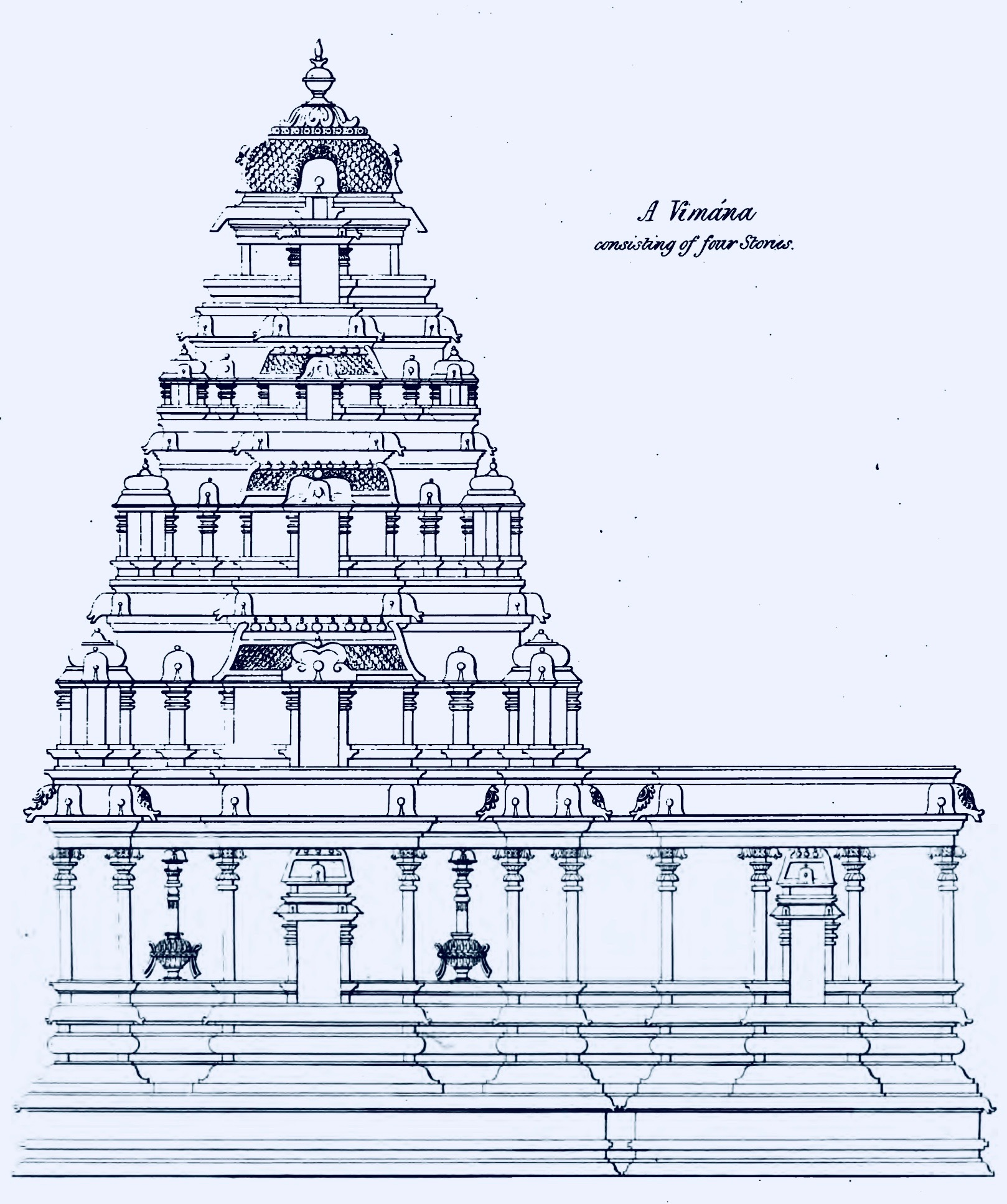
A vimana with mandapam elements (Dravidian architecture)

Dravidian style or the South Indian temple style is an architectural idiom in Hindu temple architecture that emerged in South India and in Sri Lanka, reaching its final form by the sixteenth century. It is seen in Hindu temples, and the most distinctive difference from north Indian styles is the use of a shorter and more pyramidal tower over the garbhagriha or sanctuary called a vimana, where the north has taller towers, usually bending inwards as they rise, called shikharas. However, for modern visitors to larger temples the dominating feature is the high gopura or gatehouse at the edge of the compound; large temples have several, dwarfing the vimana; these are a much more recent development. There are numerous other distinct features such as the dwarapalakas – twin guardians at the main entrance and the inner sanctum of the temple and goshtams – deities carved in niches on the outer side walls of the garbhagriha.

Mayamata and Manasara shilpa texts estimated to be in circulation by 5th to 7th century, is a guidebook on Dravidian style of Vastu Shastra design, construction, sculpture and joinery technique. Isanasivagurudeva paddhati is another text from the 9th century describing the art of building in south and central India.

From 300 BCE – 300 CE, the greatest accomplishments of the kingdoms of the early Chola, Chera and the Pandyan kingdoms included brick shrines to deities Kartikeya, Shiva, Amman and Vishnu. Several of these have been unearthed near Adichanallur, Poompuhar also known as, Kaveripoompuharpattinam and Mahabalipuram, and the construction plans of these sites of worship were shared to some detail in various poems of Sangam literature.

The architecture of the rock-cut temples, particularly the rathas, became a model for south Indian temples. Architectural features, particularly the sculptures, were widely adopted in South India. Descendants of the sculptors of the shrines are artisans in contemporary Mahabalipuram.

South Indian Temples

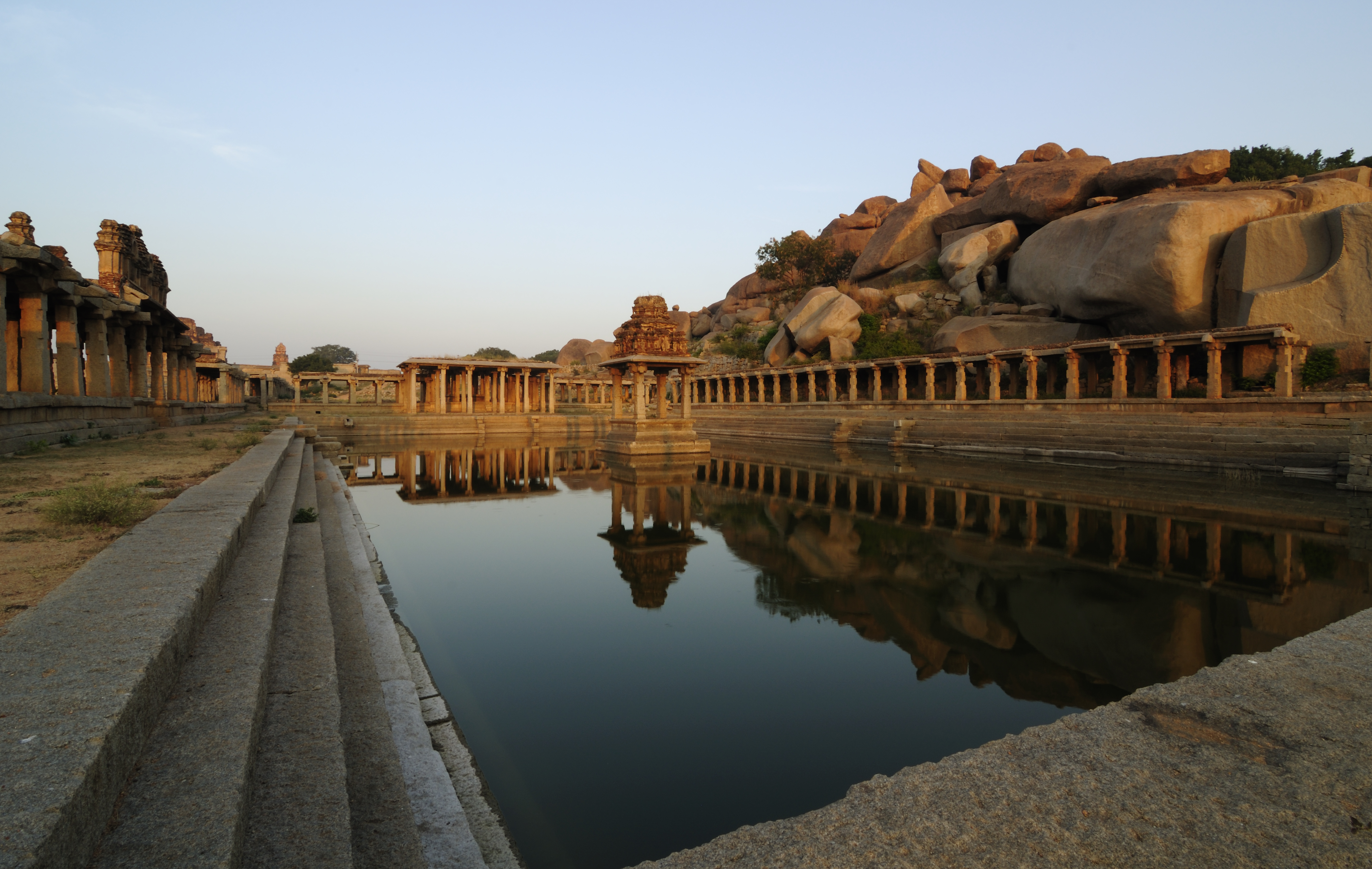
Vijayanagara Empire

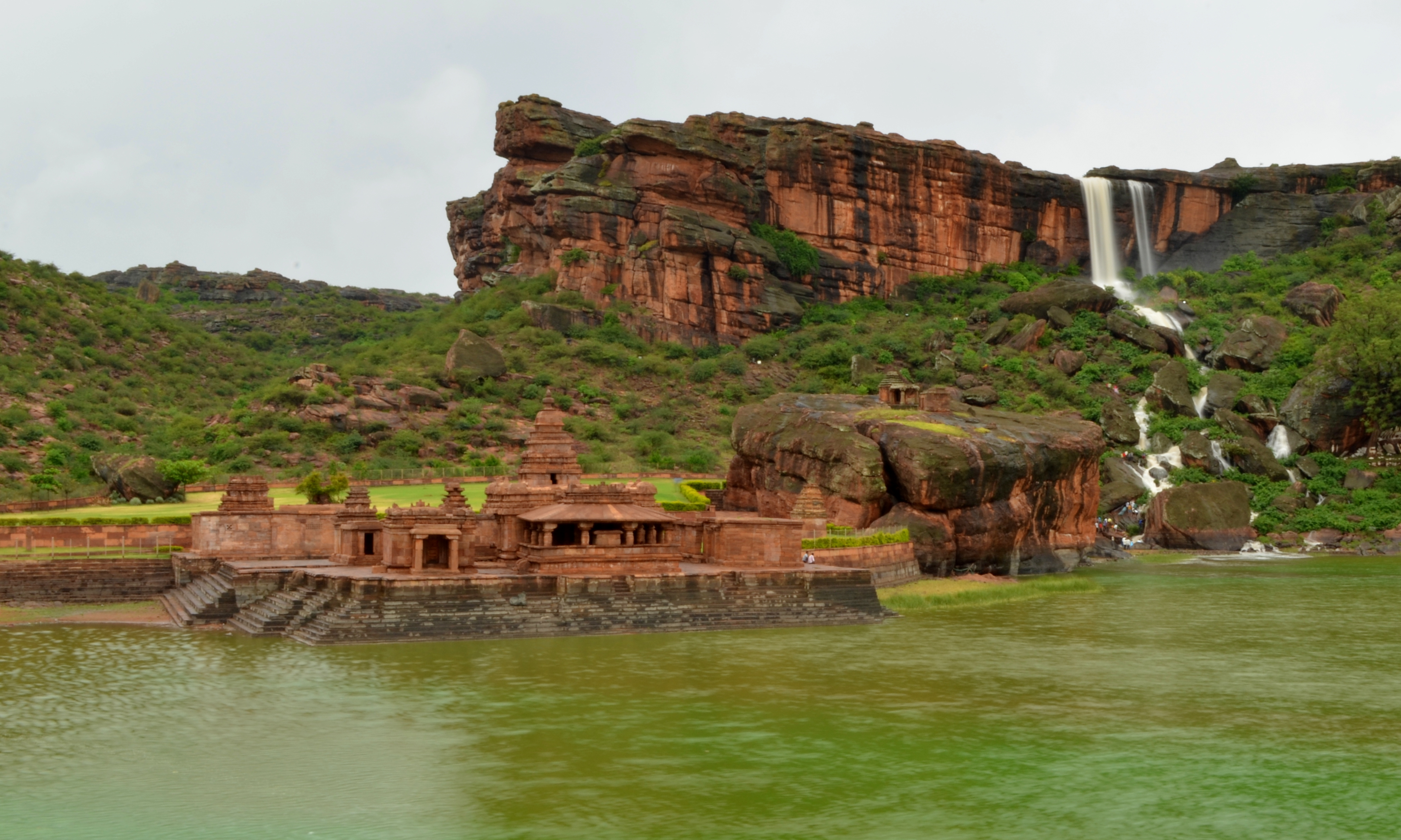
Badami Chalukya

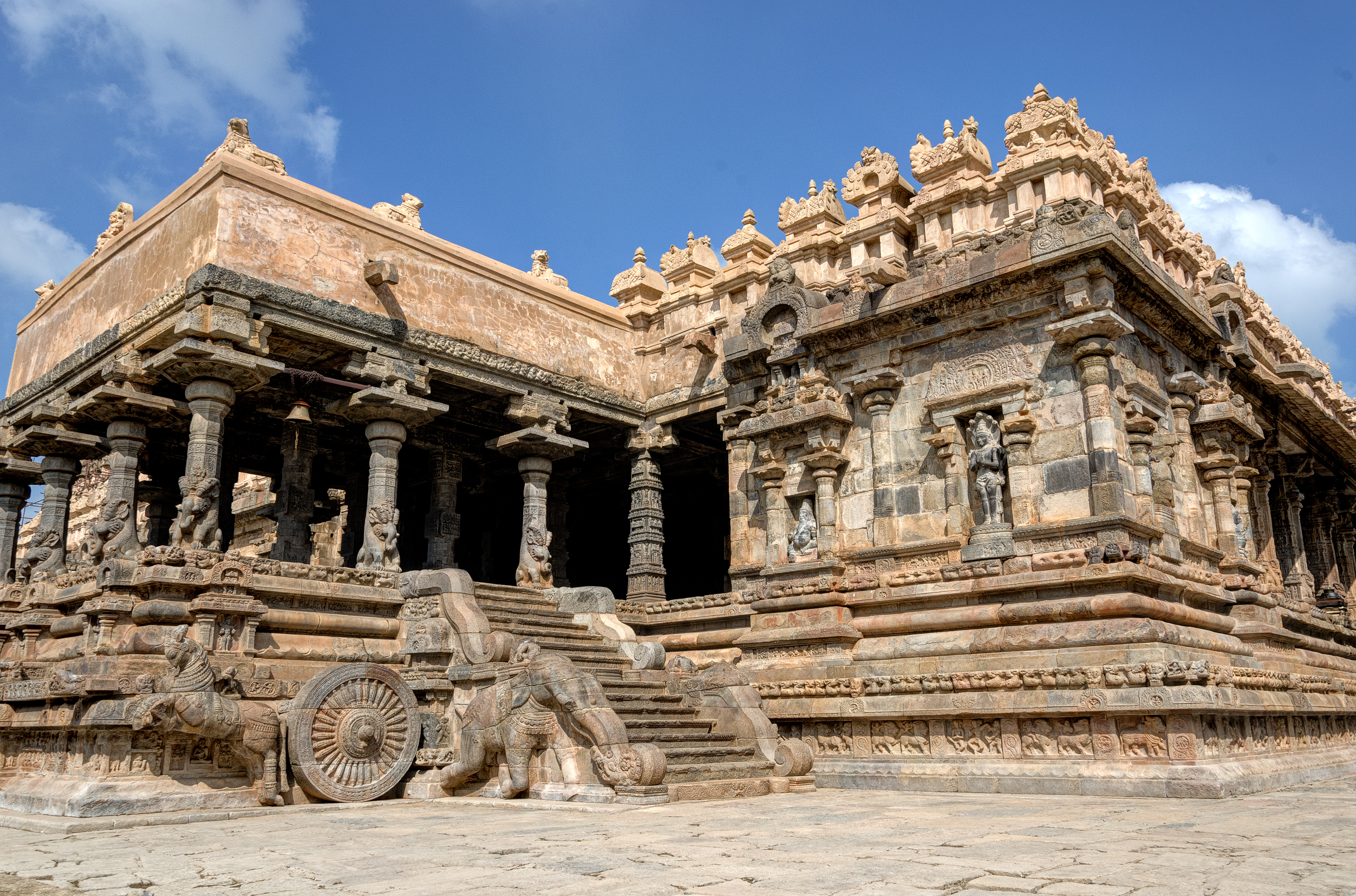
Chola thalassocracy

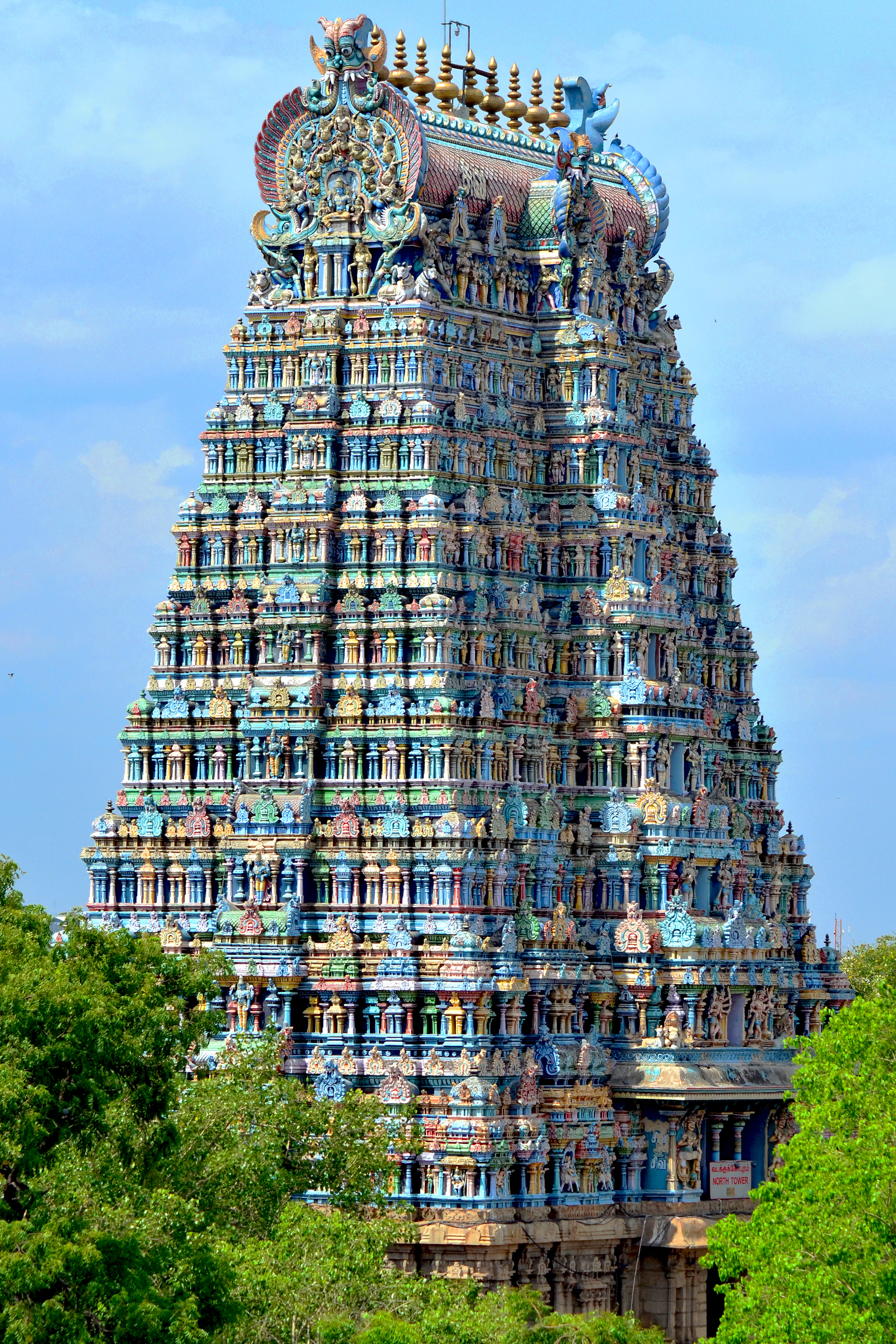
Pandya Dynasty

The Badami Chalukyas also called the Early Chalukyas, ruled from Badami, Karnataka in the period 543–753 and spawned the Vesara style called Badami Chalukya Architecture. The finest examples of their art are seen in Pattadakal, Aihole and Badami in northern Karnataka. Over 150 temples remain in the Malaprabha basin.

The Rashtrakuta contributions to art and architecture are reflected in the splendid rock-cut shrines at Ellora and Elephanta, situated in present-day Maharashtra. It is said that they altogether constructed 34 rock-cut shrines, but most extensive and sumptuous of them all is the Kailasanatha temple at Ellora. The temple is a splendid achievement of Dravidian art. The walls of the temple have marvellous sculptures from Hindu mythology including Ravana, Shiva, and Parvathi while the ceilings have paintings. These projects spread into South India from the Deccan. The architectural style used was partly Dravidian. They do not contain any of the shikharas common to the Nagara style and were built on the same lines as the Virupaksha temple at Pattadakal in Karnataka.

Vijayanagara architecture of the period 1336–1565 was a notable building style evolved by the Vijayanagara Empire that ruled most of South India from their capital at Vijayanagara on the banks of the Tungabhadra River in present-day Karnataka. The architecture of the temples built during the reign of the empire had elements of political authority. This resulted in the creation of a distinctive imperial style of architecture which featured prominently not only in temples but also in administrative structures across the Deccan. The Vijayanagara style is a combination of the Chalukya, Hoysala, Pandya and Chola styles which evolved earlier in the centuries when these empires ruled and is characterised by a return to the simplistic and serene art of the past. The South Indian temple consists essentially of a square-chambered sanctuary topped by a superstructure, tower, or spire and an attached pillared porch or hall (maṇḍapa or maṇṭapam), enclosed by a peristyle of cells within a rectangular court. The external walls of the temple are segmented by pilasters and carry niches housing sculpture. The superstructure or tower above the sanctuary is of the kūṭina type and consists of an arrangement of gradually receding stories in a pyramidal shape. Each story is delineated by a parapet of miniature shrines, square at the corners and rectangular with barrel-vault roofs at the centre.

The Warangal Fort, Thousand Pillar Temple, and Ramappa Temple are examples of Kakatiya architecture.

=== Vesara Architecture ===
The style adopted in the region that today lies in the modern states of Karnataka and Andhra Pradesh (Deccan) which served in its geographical position as buffer between north and south, that architectural style has mix of both the Nagara and Dravidian temple styles. While some scholars consider the buildings in this region as being distinctly either nagara or dravida, a hybridised style that seems to have become popular after the mid-seventh century, is known in some ancient texts as vesara. In the southern part of the Deccan, i.e., in the region of Karnataka is where some of the most experimental hybrid styles of vesara architecture are to be found.

Vesara style

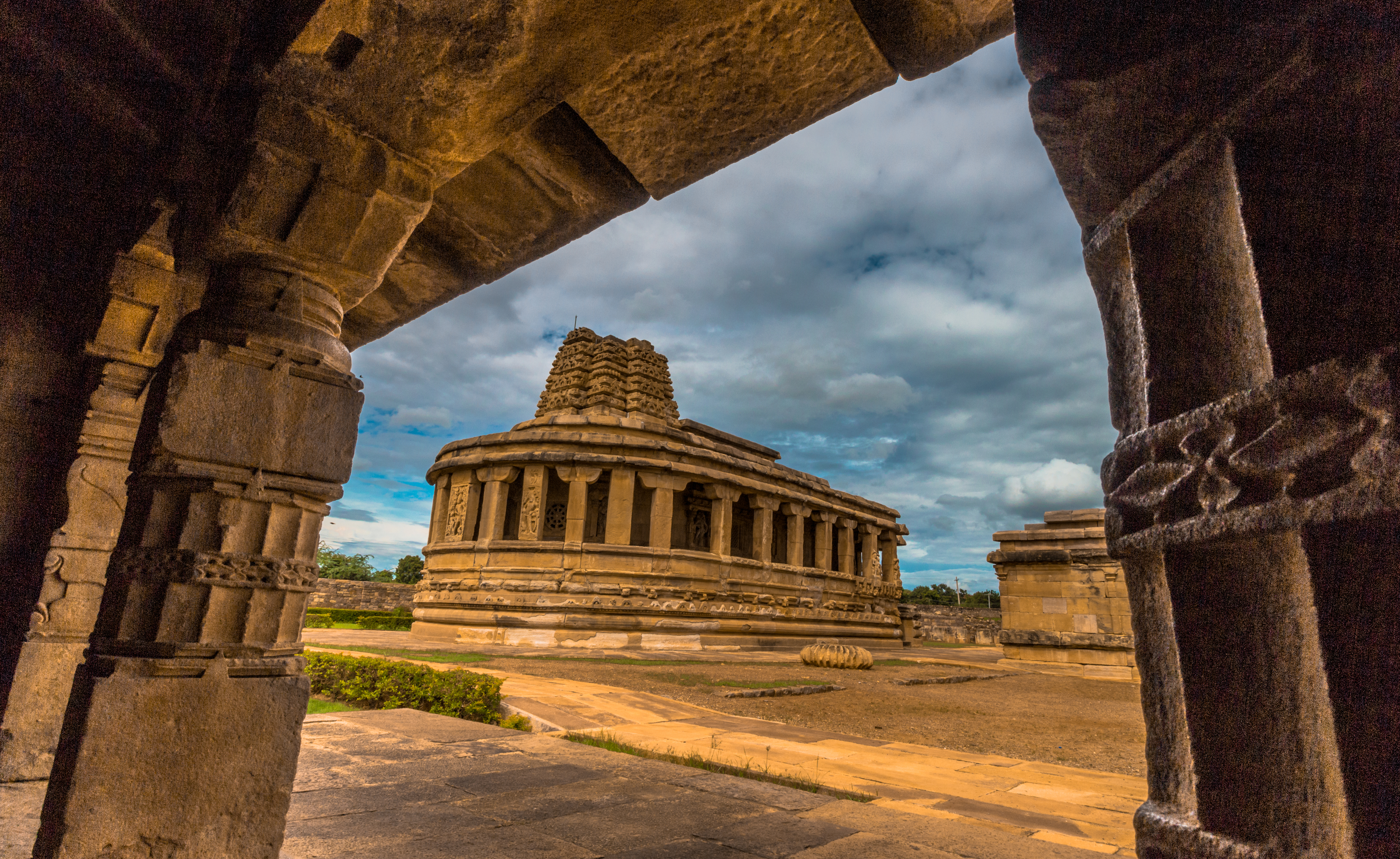
Durga temple at Aihole showing Chaitya style

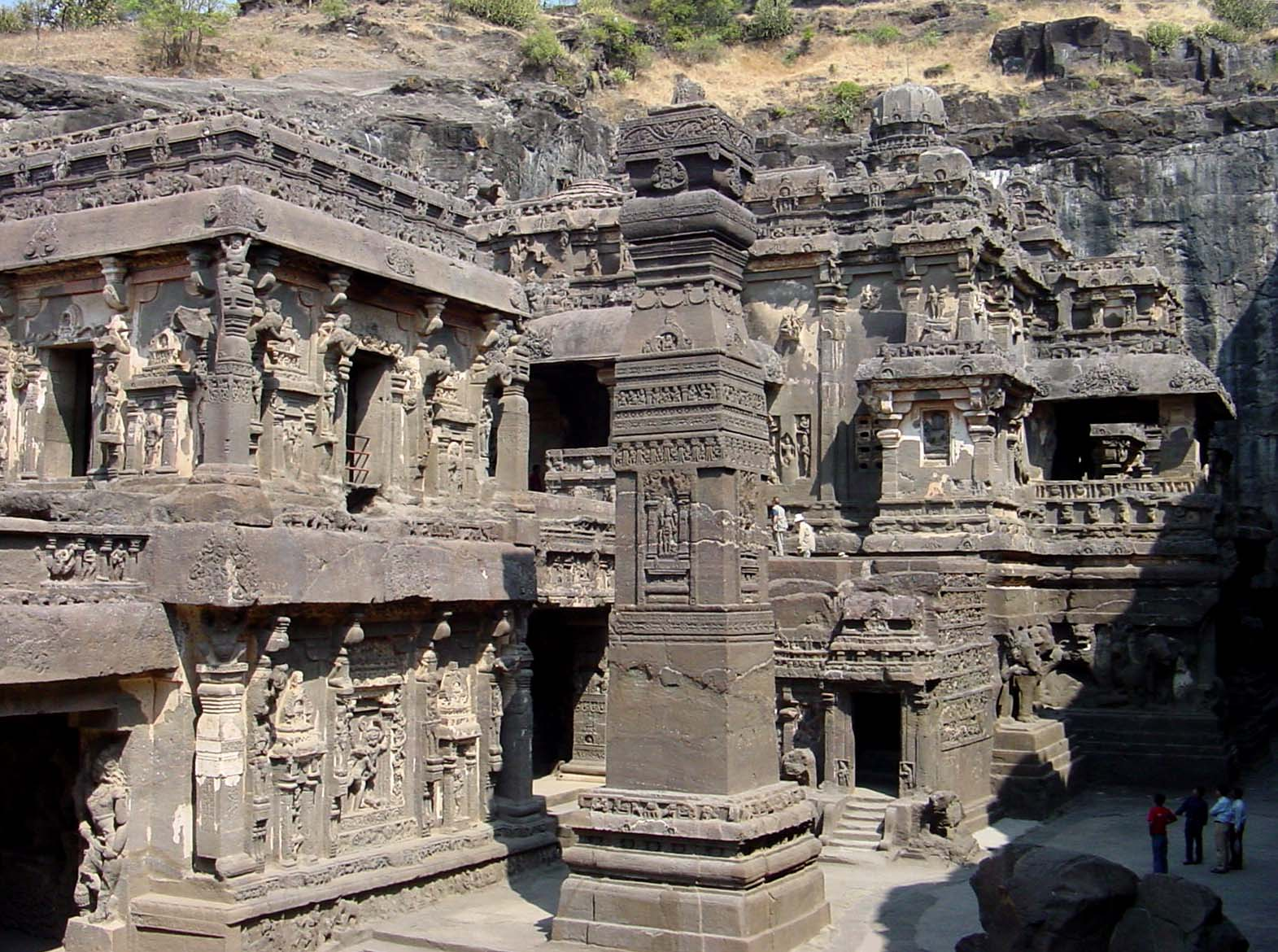
Kailasa Temple, Ellora

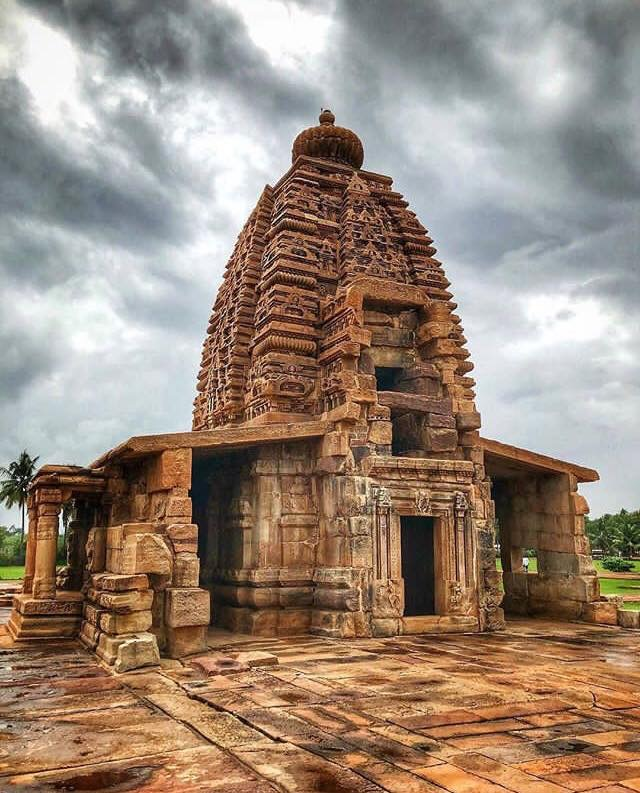
Pattadakkal Temple, Karnataka

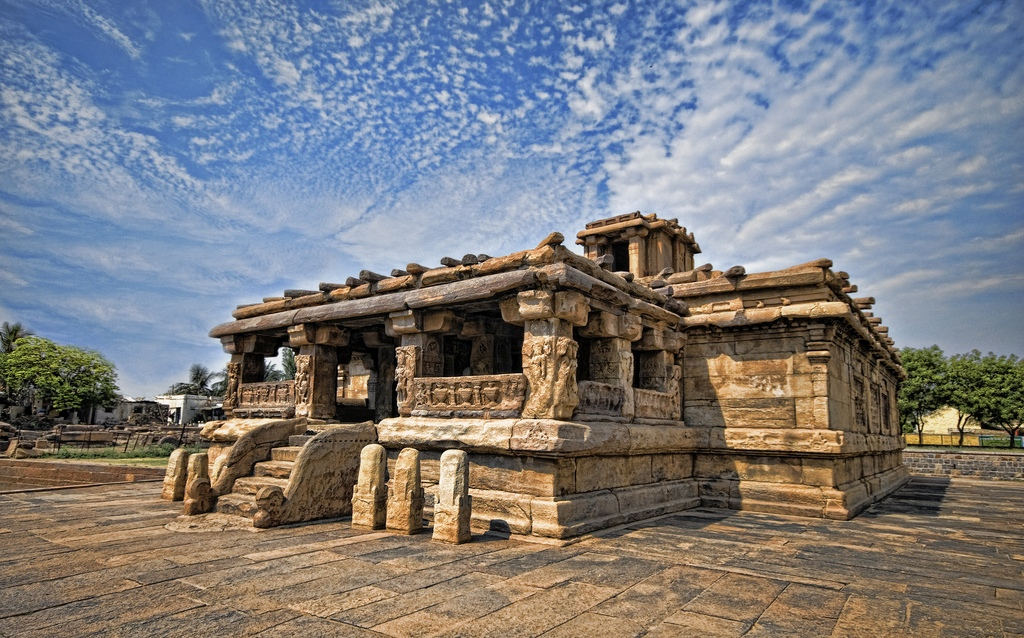
Lad Khan temple is one of the oldest Hindu temples.

An important temple is Papnath temple, dedicated to Lord Shiva. The temple is one of the best early examples of the South Indian tradition. By contrast other eastern Chalukyan Temples, like the Mahakuta, five kilometres from Badami, and the Swarga Brahma temple at Alampur show a greater assimilation of northern styles from Odisha and Rajasthan. At the same time the Durga temple at Aihole is unique having an even earlier style of an apsidal shrine which is reminiscent of Buddhist chaitya halls and is surrounded by a veranda of a later kind, with a shikhara that is stylistically like a nagara one. The Lad Khan temple at Aihole in Karnataka seems to be inspired by the wooden-roofed temples of the hills, except that it is constructed out of stone.

Historians agree that the vesara style originated in what is today Karnataka. According to some, the style was started by the Chalukyas of Badami (500-753 AD) whose Early Chalukya or Badami Chalukya architecture built temples in a style that mixed some features of the nagara and the dravida styles, for example using both the northern shikhara and southern vimana type of superstructure over the sanctum in different temples of similar date, as at Pattadakal. However, Adam Hardy and others regard this style as essentially a form of Dravida. This style was further refined by the Rashtrakutas of Manyakheta (750-983 AD) in sites such as Ellora.

Though there is clearly a good deal of continuity with the Badami or Early Chalukya style, other writers only date the start of Vesara to the later Western Chalukyas of Kalyani (983–1195 AD), in sites such as Lakkundi, Dambal, Itagi, and Gadag, and continued by the Hoysala empire (1000–1330 AD).

The Hoysala temples at Belur, Halebidu and Somanathapura are leading examples of the Vesara style. These temples are now proposed as UNESCO World Heritage Sites.

== Buddhist architecture ==
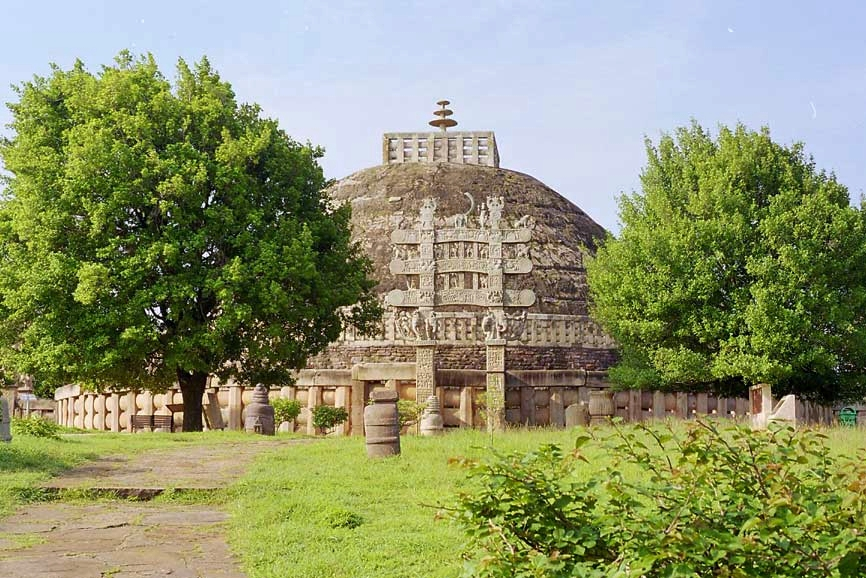
The Great Stupa at Sanchi (4th–1st century BCE). The dome-shaped stupa was used in India as a commemorative monument associated with storing sacred relics.

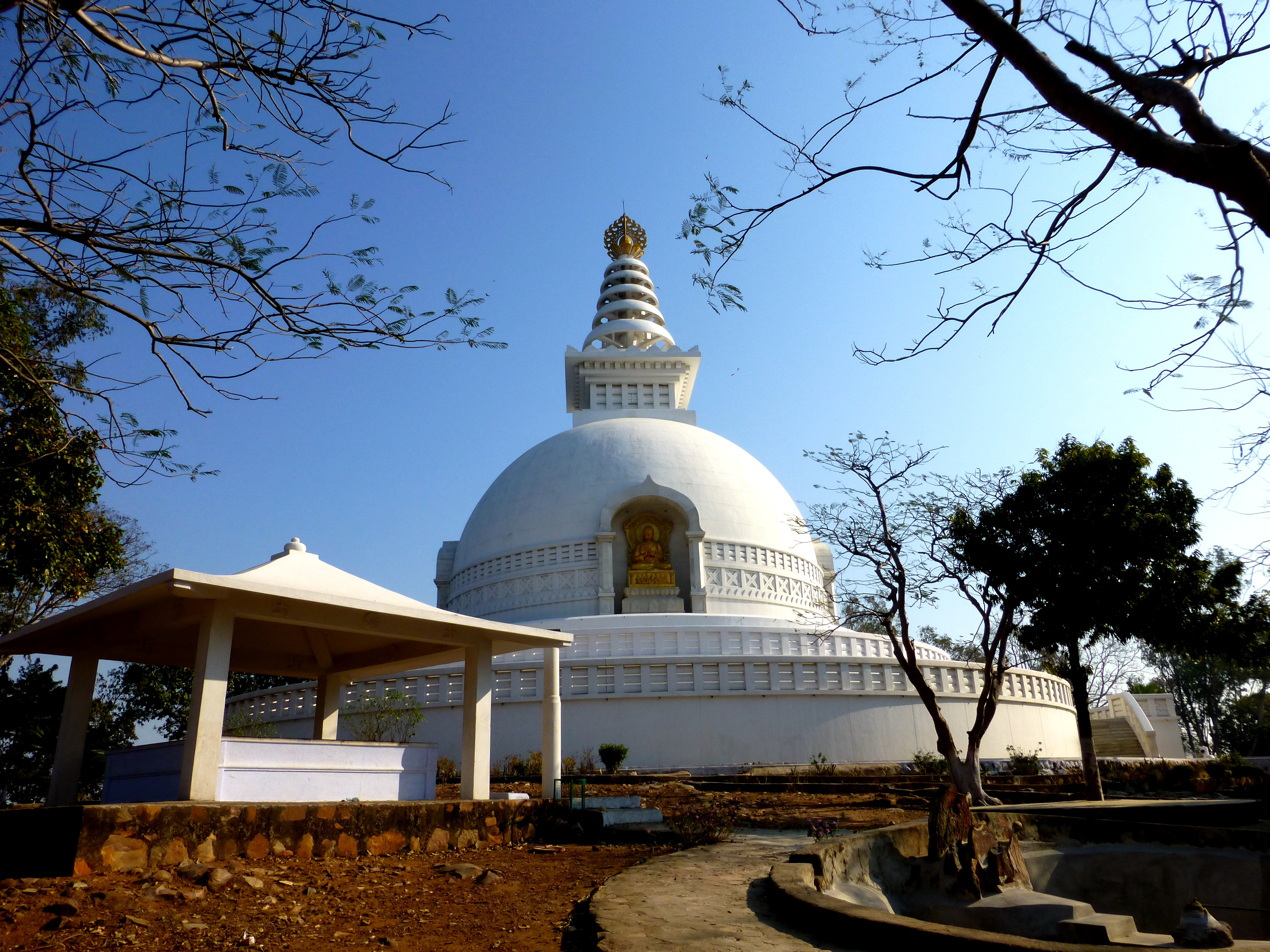
The Vishwa Shanti Stupa in Bihar.

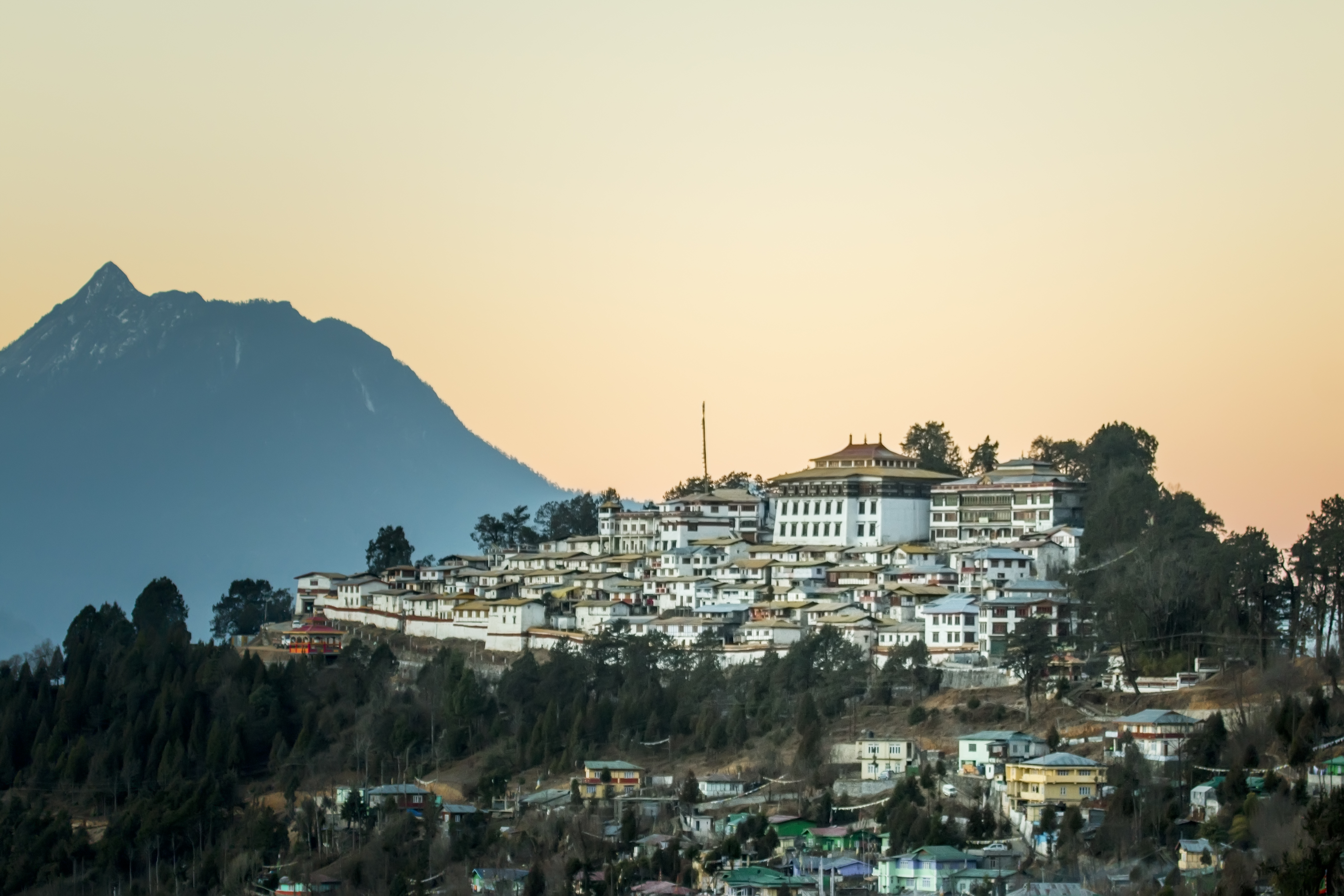
Tawang Monastery in Arunachal Pradesh. It is the largest monastery in India

Buddhism originated in the 6th century BCE with the teachings of the Buddha, who attained enlightenment in Bodh Gaya. Common elements of Buddhist architecture include vihāras (monastic residences), and chaityas (prayer halls).

The earliest examples of Buddhist architecture proliferated India's use of rock-cut architecture. The construction of Buddhist monastic buildings began before the death of the Buddha, around 400 BCE. This first generation of monasteries only survive in floor-plans, notably the Jivakarama vihara in Bihar. One of the most prominent examples of early rock-cut Buddhist architecture in India are stupas, such as the Sanchi Stupa, commissioned by Emperor Ashoka during the Mauryan Empire to enshrine relics of the Buddha. Over time, Indian Buddhist architecture diversified to include rock-cut caves, and many were carved in honour of various Mauryan emperors, such as the caves of Ajanta, Ellora, and Karle in modern-day Maharashtra, and the caves of Lomas Rishi and Barabar in modern-day Bihar.

== Jain architecture ==
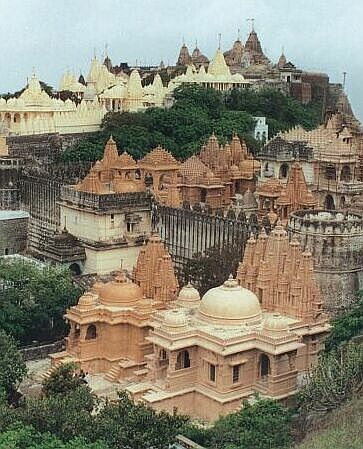
Palitana Jain Temples

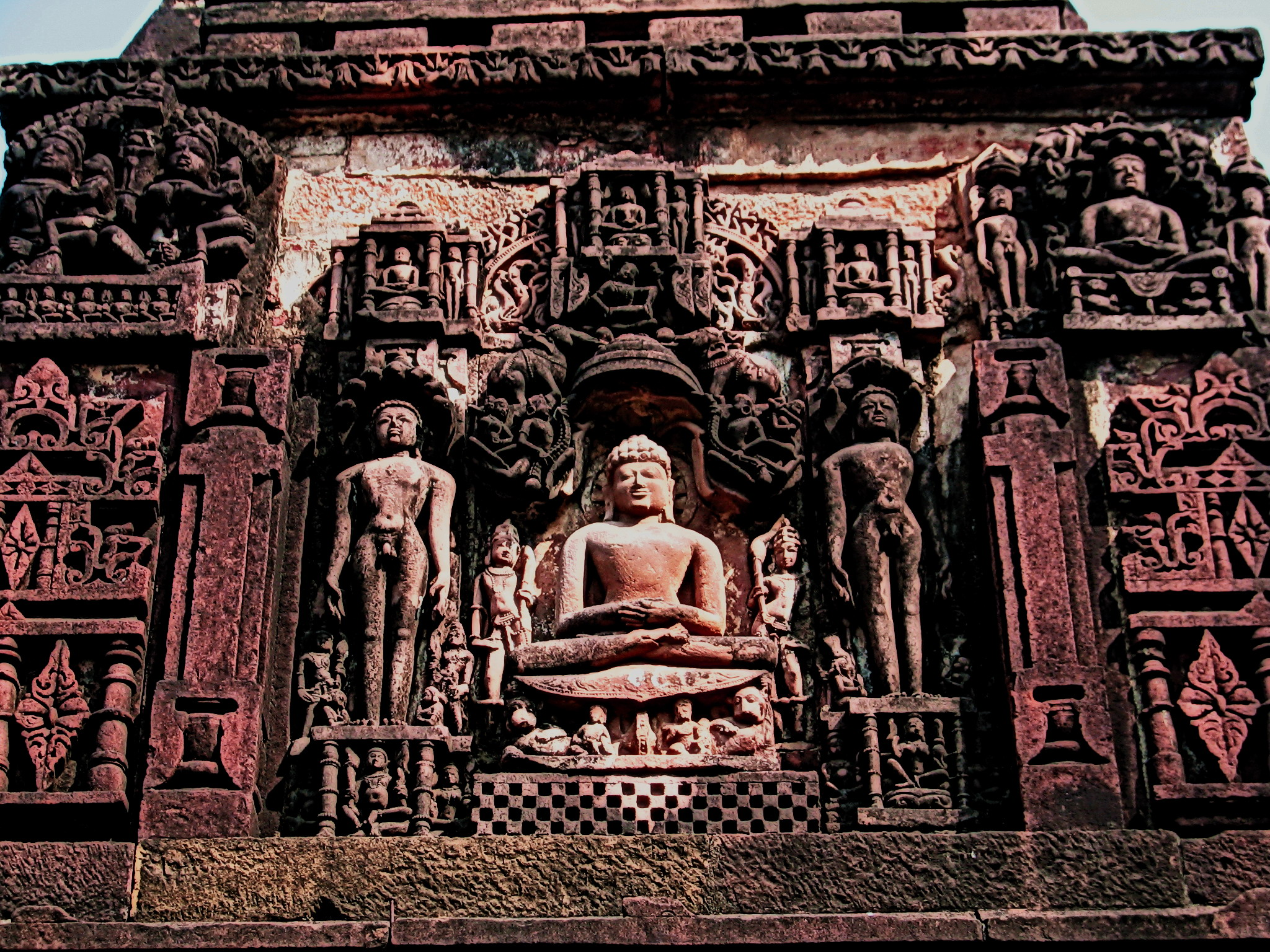
Jain Temple complex, Deogarh, Uttar Pradesh, before 862

Jain temple architecture is generally close to Hindu temple architecture, and in ancient times Buddhist religious architecture. Normally the same builders and carvers worked for all religions, and regional and period styles are generally similar. The basic layout of a Hindu and most Jain temples has consisted of a small garbhagriha or sanctuary for the main murti or cult images, over which the high superstructure rises, then one or more larger mandapa halls.

The earliest survivals of Jain architecture are part of the Indian rock-cut architecture tradition, initially shared with Buddhism, and by the end of the classical period with Hinduism. Very often numbers of rock-cut Jain temples and monasteries share a site with those of the other religions, as at Udayagiri, Bava Pyara, Ellora, Aihole, Badami, and Kalugumalai. The Ellora Caves are a late site, which contains temples of all three religions, as the earlier Buddhist ones give way to later Hindu excavations.

There is considerable similarity between the styles of the different religions, but often the Jains placed large figures of one or more of the 24 tirthankaras in the open air rather than inside the shrine. These statues later began to be very large, normally standing nude figures in the kayotsarga meditation position (which is similar to standing at attention). Examples include the Gopachal rock cut Jain monuments and the Siddhachal Caves, with groups of statues, and a number of single figures including the 12th-century Gommateshwara statue, and the modern Statue of Vasupujya and, largest of all at 108 feet (33 meters) tall, the Statue of Ahimsa.

The main buildings of the largest Dilwara temples are surrounded by "cloister" screens of devakulikā shrines, and are fairly plain on the outer walls of these; in the case of the Vimal Vasahi this screen was a later addition, around the time of the second temple. Surrounding the main temple with a curtain of shrines was to become a distinctive feature of the Jain temples of West India, still employed in some modern temples.

Mostly funded by private individuals or groups, and catering to a smaller population, Jain temples tend to be at the small or middle end of the range of sizes, but at pilgrimage sites they may cluster in large groups – there are altogether several hundred at Palitana, tightly packed within several high-walled compounds called "tuks" or "tonks". Temple charitable trusts, such as the very large Anandji Kalyanji Trust, founded in the 17th century and now maintaining 1,200 temples, play a very important role in funding temple building and maintenance.

=== Māru-Gurjara architecture ===
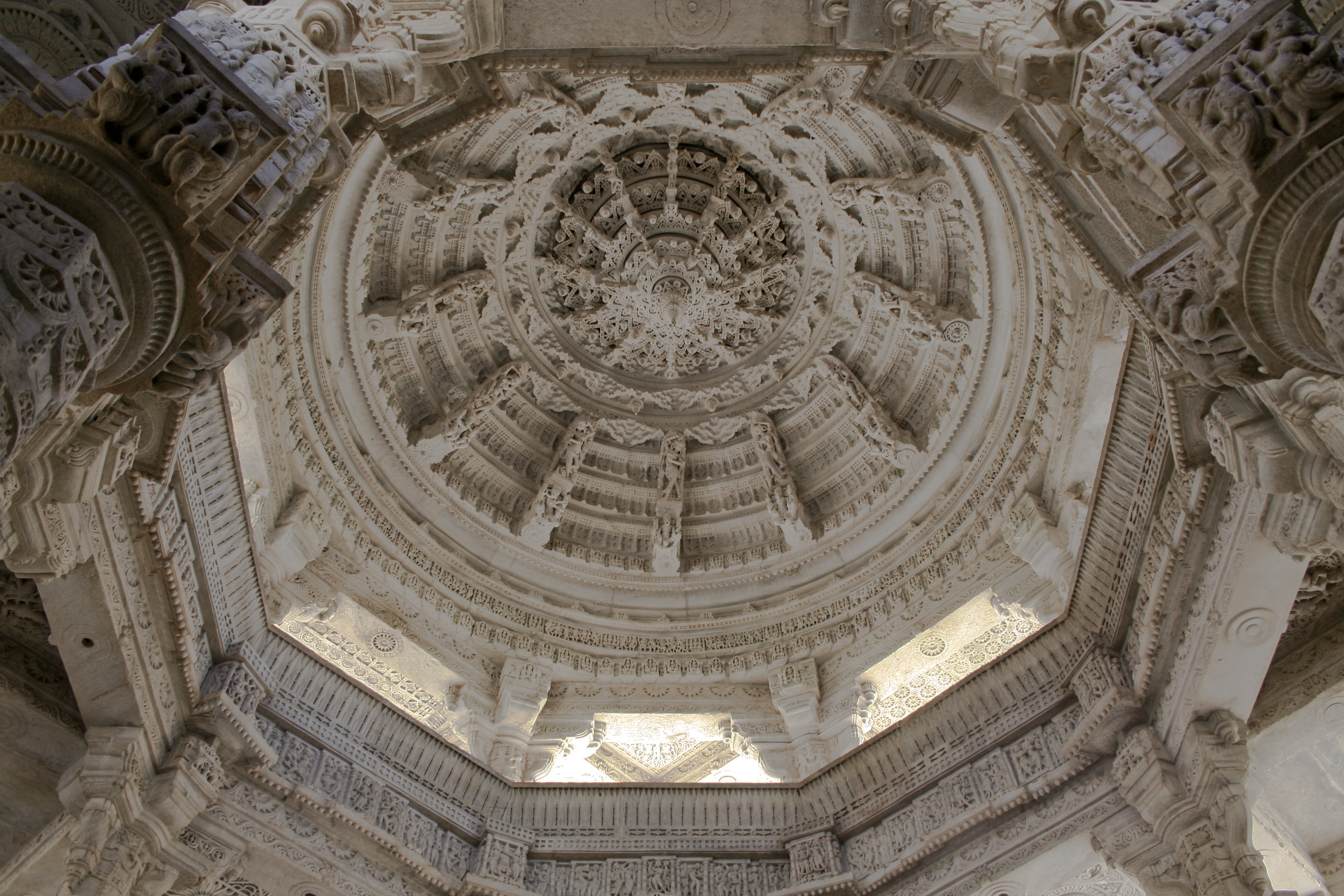
Temple ceiling of Ranakpur Jain Temple, Rajasthan

Regional differences in Hindu temples are largely reflected in Jain ones, except that Māru-Gurjara architecture or the "Solanki style" has become to some extent a pan-Indian, indeed pan-global Jain style. This is a particular temple style from Gujarat and Rajasthan (both regions with a strong Jain presence) that originated in both Hindu and Jain temples around 1000, but became enduringly popular with Jain patrons, spreading to other parts of India and the global Jain diaspora of the last century. It has remained in use, in somewhat modified form, to the present day, indeed also becoming popular again for some Hindu temples in the last century. The style is seen in the groups of pilgrimage temples at Dilwara on Mount Abu, Taranga, Girnar and Palitana.

Interiors are more lavishly decorated, with elaborate carving on most surfaces. In particular, Jain temples often have small low domes carved on the inside with a highly intricate rosette design. Another distinctive feature is "flying" arch-like elements between pillars, touching the horizontal beam above in the centre, and elaborately carved. These have no structural function, and are purely decorative. The style developed large pillared halls, many open at the sides, with Jain temples often having one closed and two pillared halls in sequence on the main axis leading to the shrine.

The Māru-Gurjara style did not represent a radical break with earlier styles. The previous styles in north-west India, and the group of Jain temples of Khajuraho, forming part of the famous Khajuraho Group of Monuments are very largely in the same style as their Hindu companions, which were mostly built between 950 and 1050. They share many features with the Māru-Gurjara style: high plinths with many decorated bands on the walls, lavish figurative and decorative carving, balconies looking out on multiple sides, ceiling rosettes, and others, but at Khajuraho the great height of the shikharas is given more emphasis. There are similarities with the contemporary Hoysala architecture from much further south. In both of these styles architecture is treated sculpturally.

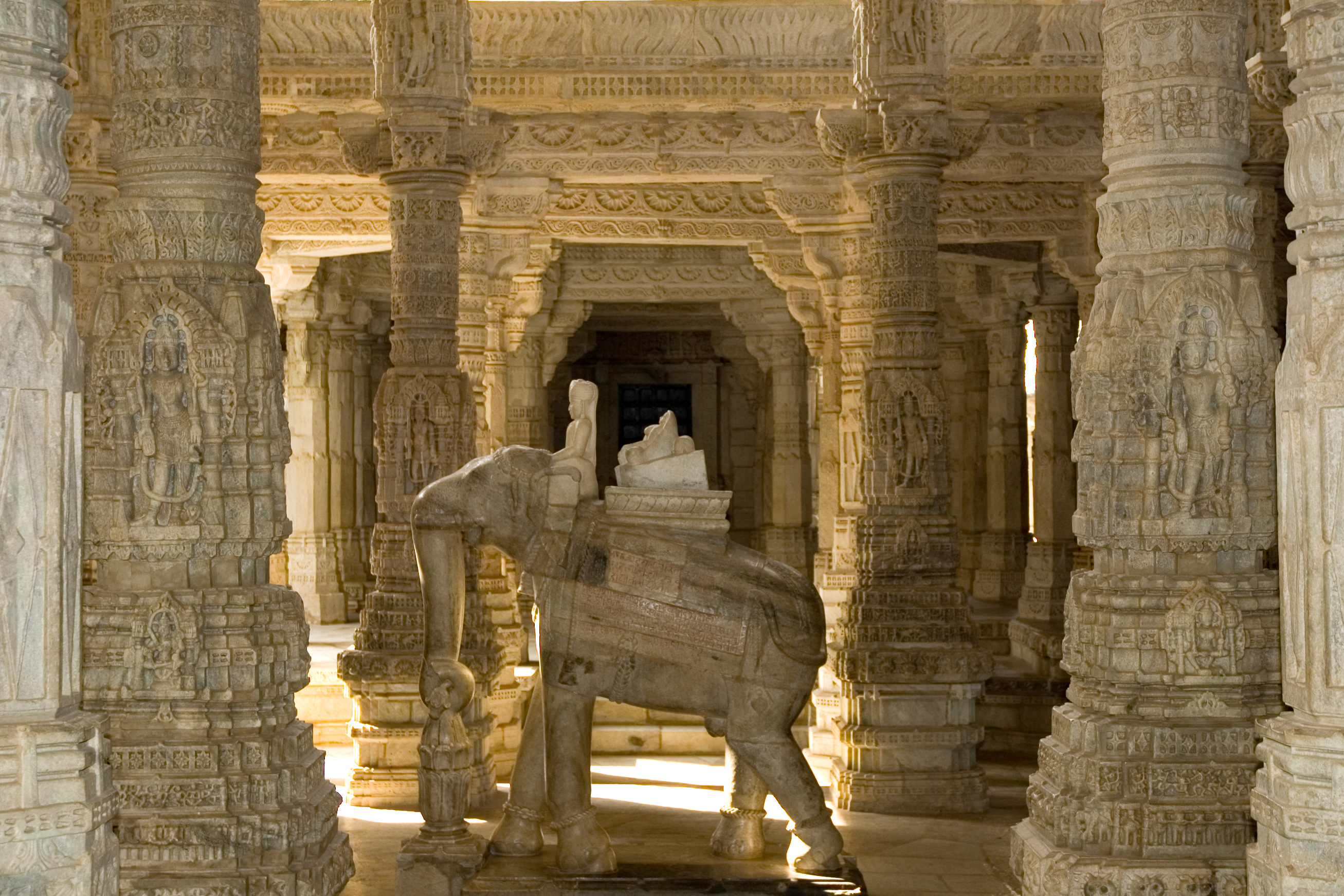
Detailed carving of elephant, Ranakpur Jain Temple

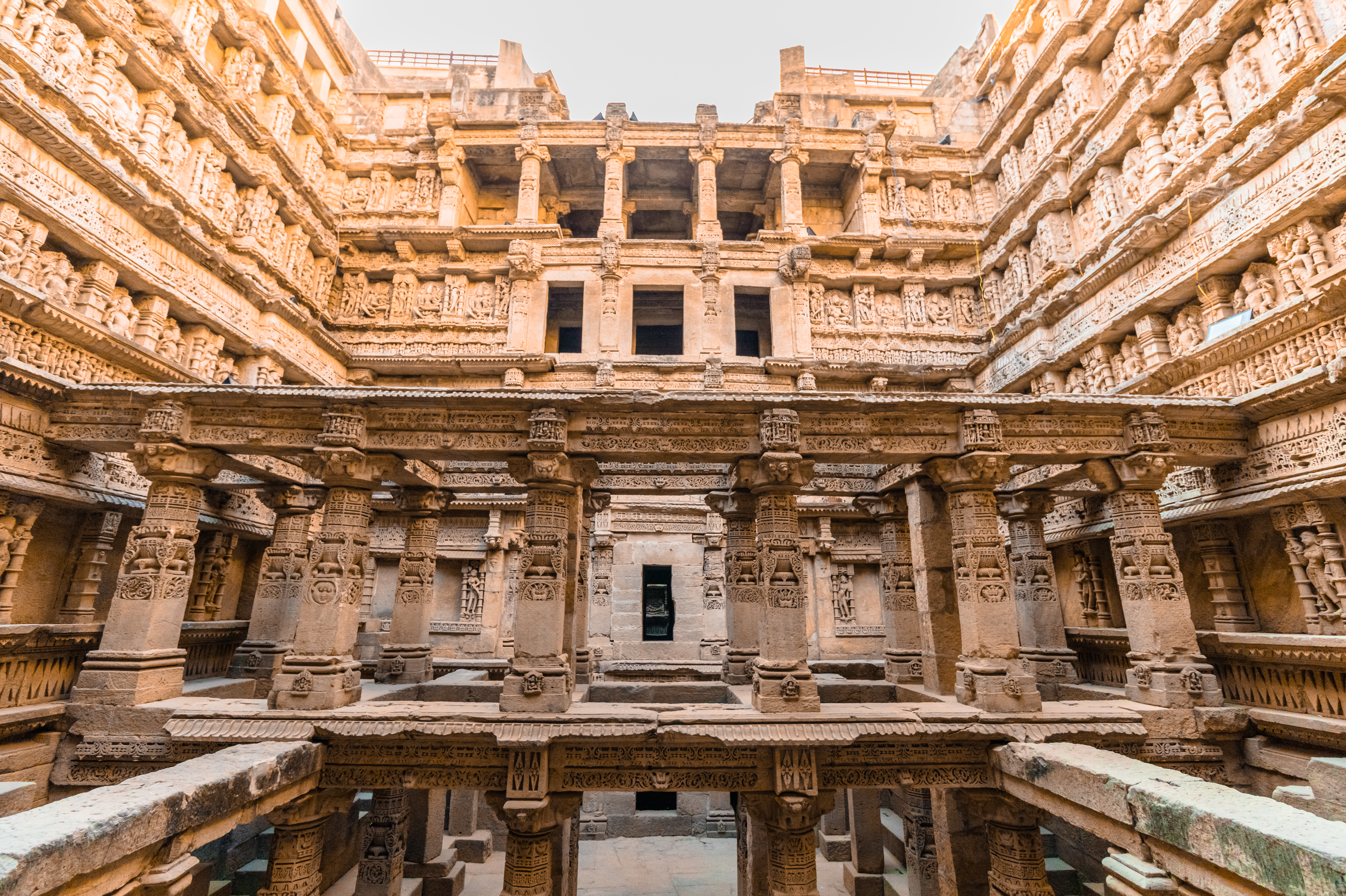
Rani Ki Vav, Gujarat

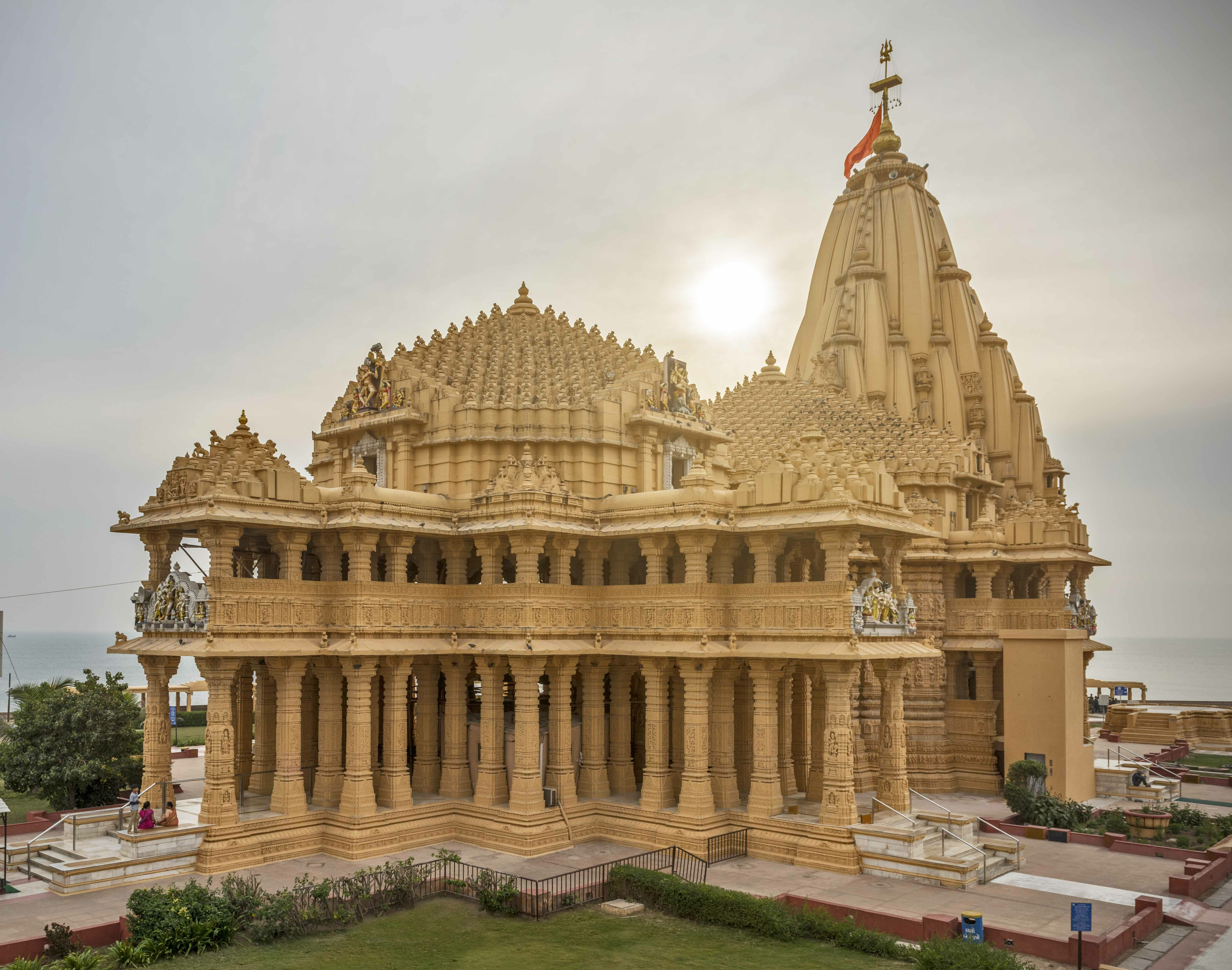
Somanath Temple

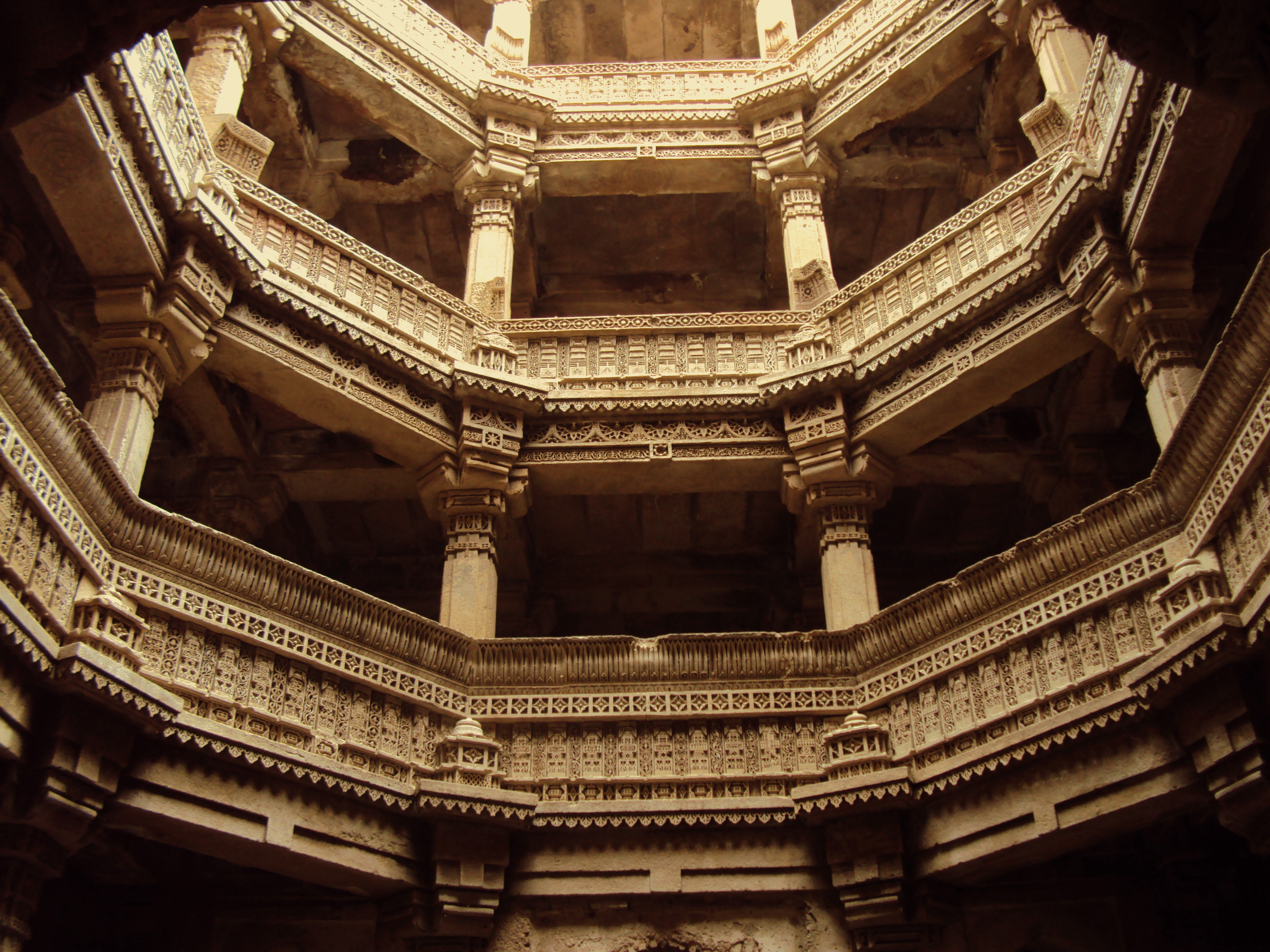
Adalaj stepwell

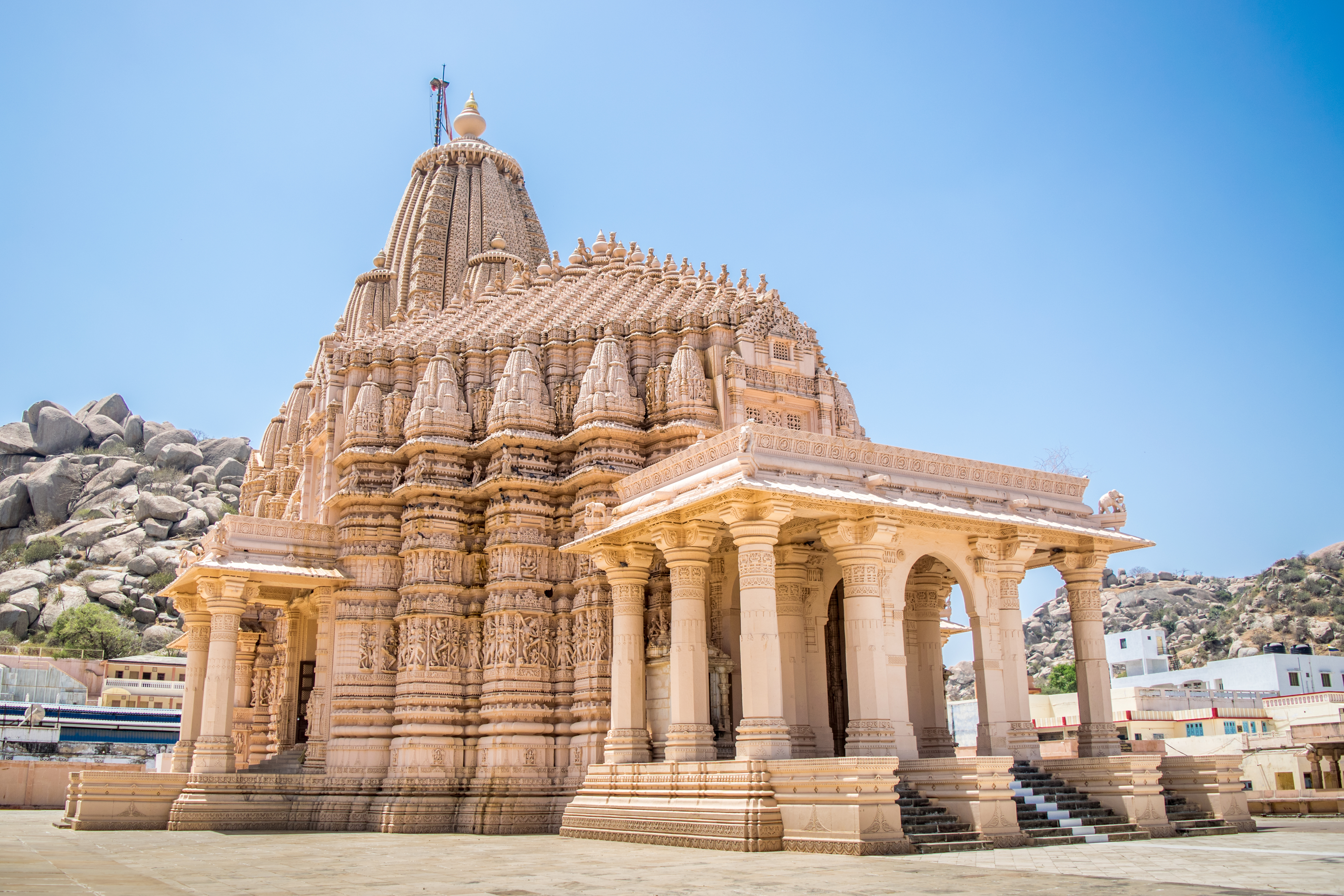
Taranga Jain Temple, Gujarat

== Sikh Architecture ==
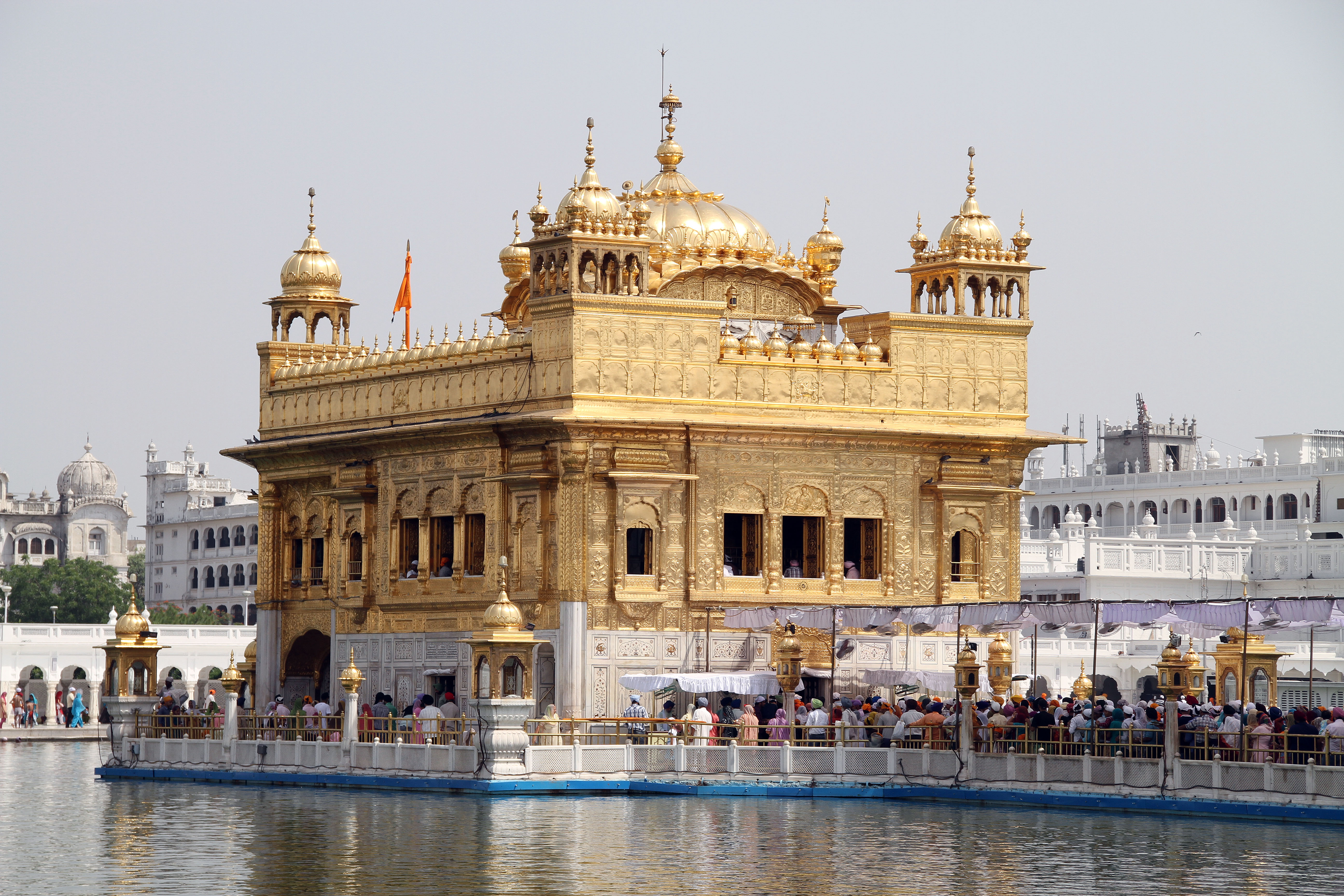
The Golden Temple in Amritsar

Sikh architecture is influenced by Mughal styles, which itself was influenced by Rajput styles. The onion dome, frescoes, in-lay work, and multi-foil arches, are Mughal influences, more specially from Shah Jahan's period, whereas chattris, oriel windows, bracket supported eaves at the string-course, and ornamented friezes are derived from elements of Rajput architecture. Apart from religious buildings, Sikh architecture includes secular forts, bungas (residential places), palaces, and colleges.

=== Gurdwara ===
The religious structure is called gurdwara (a place where the Guru dwells). The word gurdwara is a compound of guru (guide or master) and dwara (gateway or seat). The Golden Temple in Amritsar and Hazur Sahib are examples.

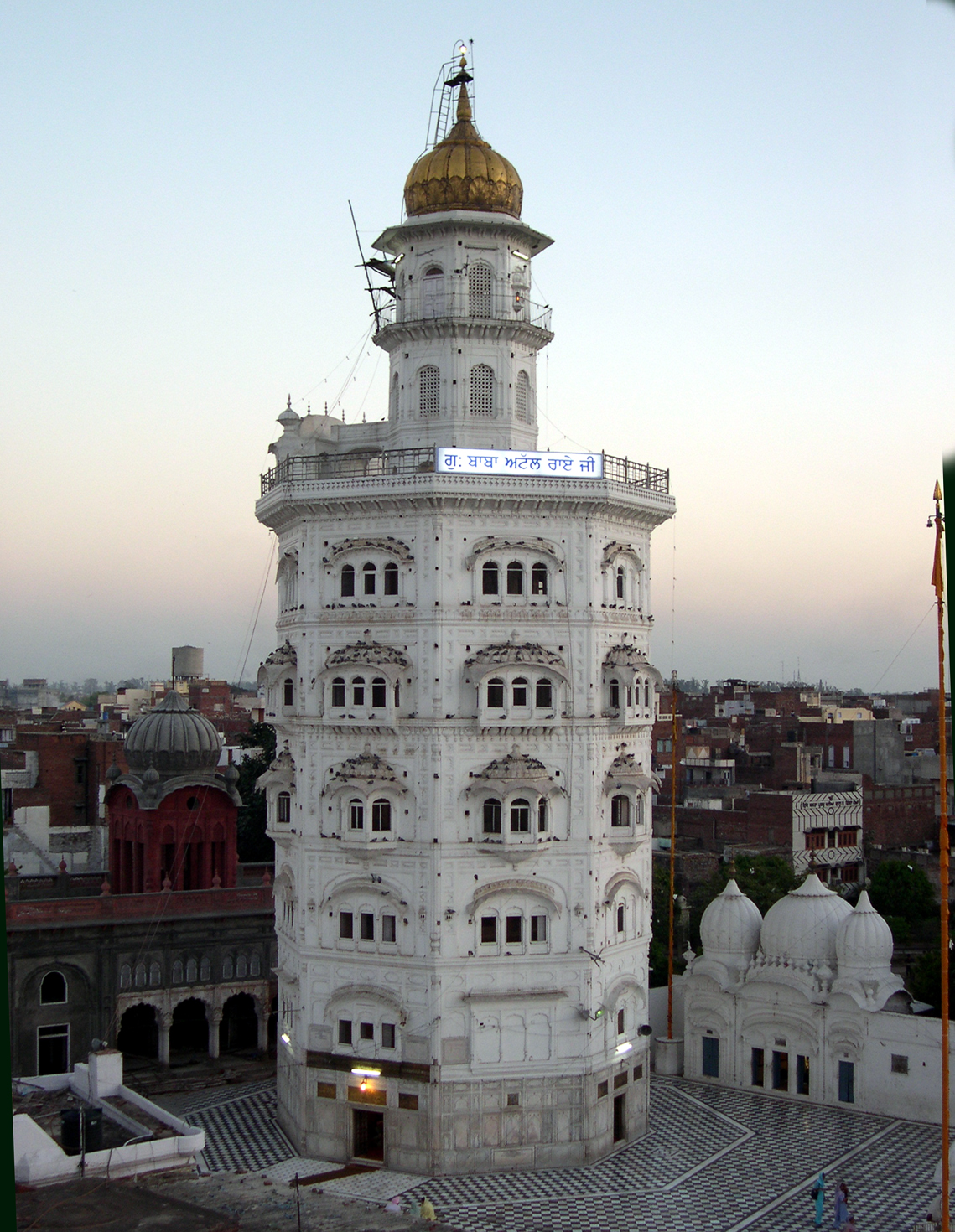
Gurdwara Baba Atal is a 17th-century nine-storeyed Gurdwara in Amritsar.

Gurdwara buildings do not have to conform to any set architectural design. The only established requirements are: the installation of the Granth Sahib under a canopy or in a canopied seat, usually on a platform higher than the specific floor on which the devotees sit, and a tall Sikh pennant flag atop the building.

In the 21st century, more and more gurdwaras (especially within India) have been following the Harimandir Sahib pattern, a synthesis of Indo-Islamic and Sikh architecture. Most of them have square halls, stand on a higher plinth, have entrances on all four sides, and have square or octagonal domed sanctums usually in the middle. During recent decades, to meet the requirements of larger gatherings, bigger and better ventilated assembly halls, with the sanctum at one end, have become accepted style. The location of the sanctum, more often than not, is such as to allow space for circumambulation. Sometimes, to augment the space, verandahs are built to skirt the hall. A popular model for the dome is the ribbed lotus, topped by an ornamental pinnacle. Arched copings, kiosks and solid domelets are used for exterior decorations.

== Indo-Islamic architecture ==
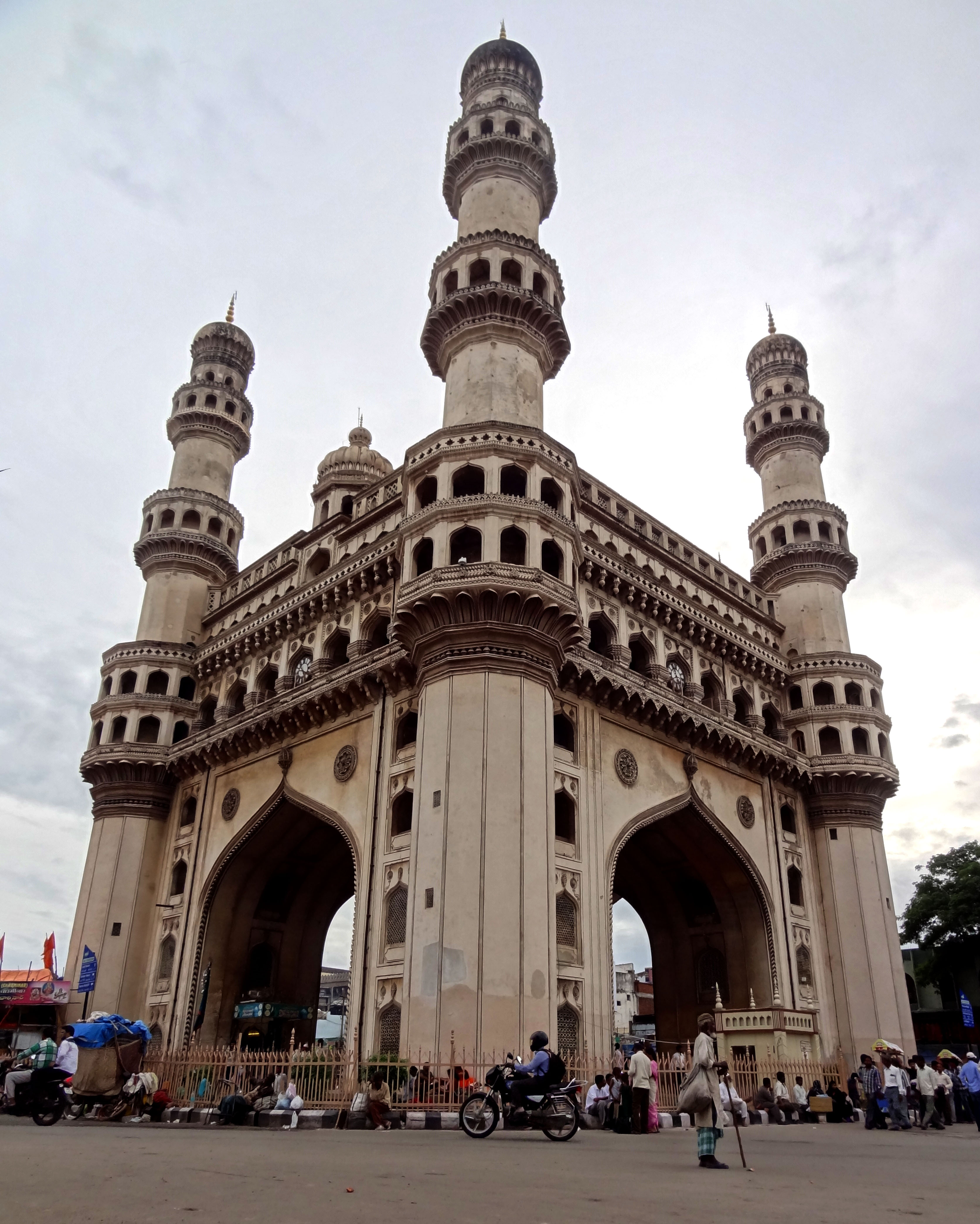
The Charminar, built in the 16th century by the Golconda Sultanate

Indo-Islamic architecture began under the influence of Islam in the Indian subcontinent around the late 12th century. Many of these styles were also influenced by regional Indian architecture. Indo-Islamic architecture replaced Indian trabeate style with the arcuate style as well. Turks and Persians, who inherited a wealth of various designs from the Sassanian and Byzantine Empires, shaped and influenced the architecture.

Islamic buildings initially adapted the skills of a workforce trained in earlier Indian traditions to their own designs. Unlike most of the Islamic world, where brick tended to predominate, India had highly skilled builders well used to producing stone masonry of extremely high quality. Alongside the architecture developed in Delhi and prominent centres of Mughal culture such as Agra, Lahore and Allahabad, a variety of regional styles developed in regional kingdoms like the Bengal, Gujarat, Deccan, Jaunpur and Kashmir Sultanates. Following the collapse of the Mughal Empire, regional nawabs such as in Lucknow, Hyderabad and Mysore continued to commission and patronize the construction of Mughal-commissioned architecture in the princely states.

=== Sultanate ===
Significant regional styles developed in the independent sultanates formed when the Tughlaq empire weakened in the mid-14th century, and lasted until most were absorbed into the Mughal Empire in the 16th century. Apart from the sultanates of the Deccan Plateau, Gujarat, Bengal, and Kashmir, the architecture of the Malwa and Jaunpur sultanates also left some significant buildings.

==== Delhi Sultanate ====
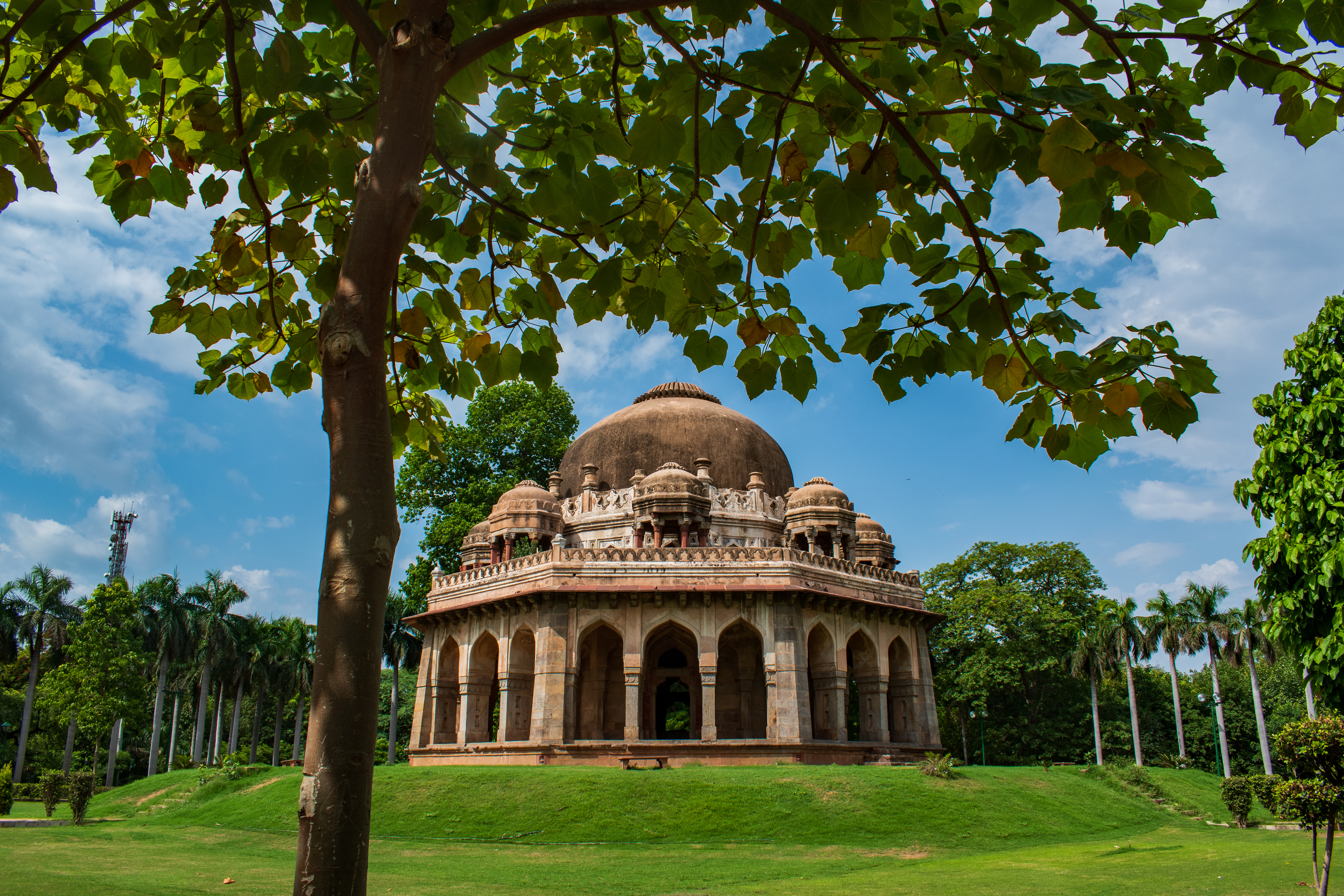
Tomb of Muhammad Shah, Lodi Gardens

The start of the Delhi Sultanate in 1206 under Qutb al-Din Aibak introduced a large Islamic state to India, using Central Asian styles. The important Qutb Complex in Delhi began under Muhammad of Ghor, by 1199, and continued under Qutb al-Din Aibak and later sultans. The Quwwat-ul-Islam Mosque, now a ruin, was the first structure. Like other early Islamic buildings it reused elements such as columns from destroyed Hindu and Jain temples, including one on the same site whose platform was reused. The arches were corbelled in the traditional Indian way. Alai Minar, a minaret twice the size of Qutb Minar was commissioned by Alauddin Khilji but never completed. Other examples include the Tughlaqabad Fort and Hauz Khas Complex.

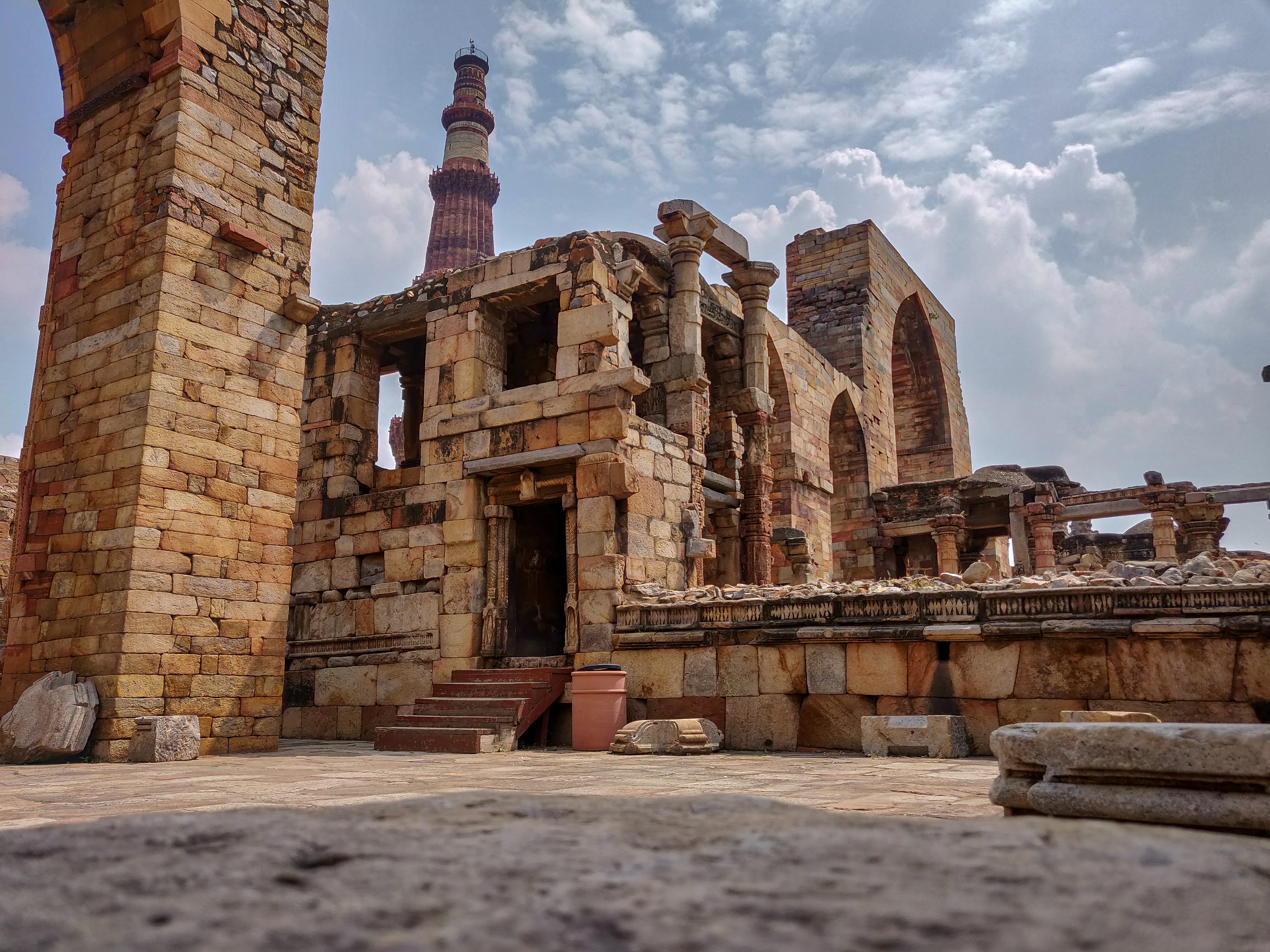
Qutb complex

Another very early mosque, begun in the 1190s, is the Adhai Din Ka Jhonpra in Ajmer, Rajasthan, built for the same Delhi rulers, again with corbelled arches and domes. Here Hindu temple columns (and possibly some new ones) are piled up in threes to achieve extra height. Both mosques had large detached screens with pointed corbelled arches added in front of them, probably under Iltutmish a couple of decades later.

At Ajmer the smaller screen arches are tentatively cusped, for the first time in India. By around 1300 true domes and arches with voussoirs were being built; the ruined Tomb of Balban (c. 1287) in Delhi may be the earliest survival. The Alai Darwaza gatehouse at the Qutb Complex, from 1311, still shows a cautious approach to the new technology, with very thick walls and a shallow dome, only visible from a certain distance or height. Bold contrasting colours of masonry, with red sandstone and white marble, introduce what was to become a common feature of Indo-Islamic architecture, substituting for the polychrome tiles used in Persia and Central Asia. The pointed arches come together slightly at their base, giving a mild horseshoe arch effect, and their internal edges are not cusped but lined with conventionalized "spearhead" projections, possibly representing lotus buds. Jali, stone openwork screens, are introduced here; they already had been long used in temples.

By the time of Tughlaqs Islamic architecture in India had adopted some features of earlier Indian architecture, such as the use of a high plinth, and often mouldings around its edges, as well as columns and brackets and hypostyle halls. After the death of Firoz the Tughlaqs declined, and the following Delhi dynasties were weak. Most of the monumental buildings constructed were tombs, although the impressive Lodi Gardens in Delhi (adorned with fountains, charbagh gardens, ponds, tombs and mosques) were constructed by the late Lodi dynasty. The architecture of other regional Muslim states was often more impressive.

==== Deccan Sultanates ====
Dawood Shah of Bahamani Sultanate ruled for very short amount of time in 1378 but invented a new style of tomb, comprising two similar, domed structures on a single basement, a style not seen anywhere outside Kalaburagi. Firuz Shah who died in 1422 copied the double-chambered style but made his tomb much simpler. The black basalt door jambs reminiscent of temple pillars, the recessed arches bearing stucco floral work, arches bearing stucco floral work, and the chajjas borne on brackets that resemble those found in temples all become common features in later Bahmani architecture. Rangin Mahal in Bidar Fort, built by Ali Barid Shah in the 1500s. While the beautiful tile mosaics on some of its walls and the luminescent mother-of-pearl inlays on black basalt are Persian in style, its carved wooden pillars and brackets are clearly derived from local residential architecture.

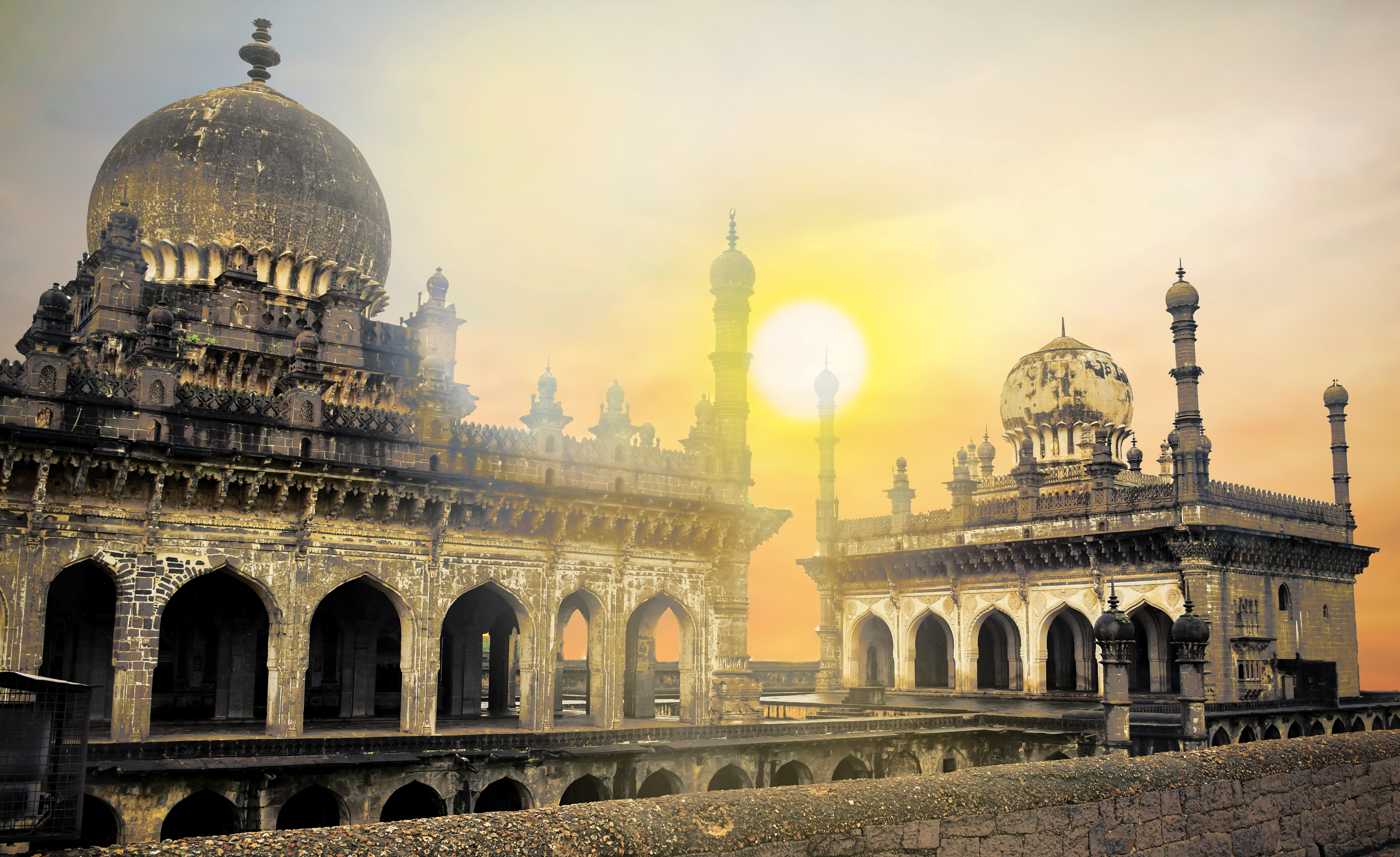
Burial place of Ibrahim Adil Shah II

The main architectural activities for the Barid Shahi rulers were building garden tombs. The tomb of Ali Barid Shah (1577) is the most notable monument in Bidar. The tomb consists of a lofty domed chamber, open on four sides, located in the middle of a Persian four-square garden. The Rangin Mahal in Bidar, built during the reign of Ali Barid Shah, is a complete and exquisitely decorated courtly structure. Other important monuments in Bidar from this period are the tomb of Qasim II and the Kali Masjid.

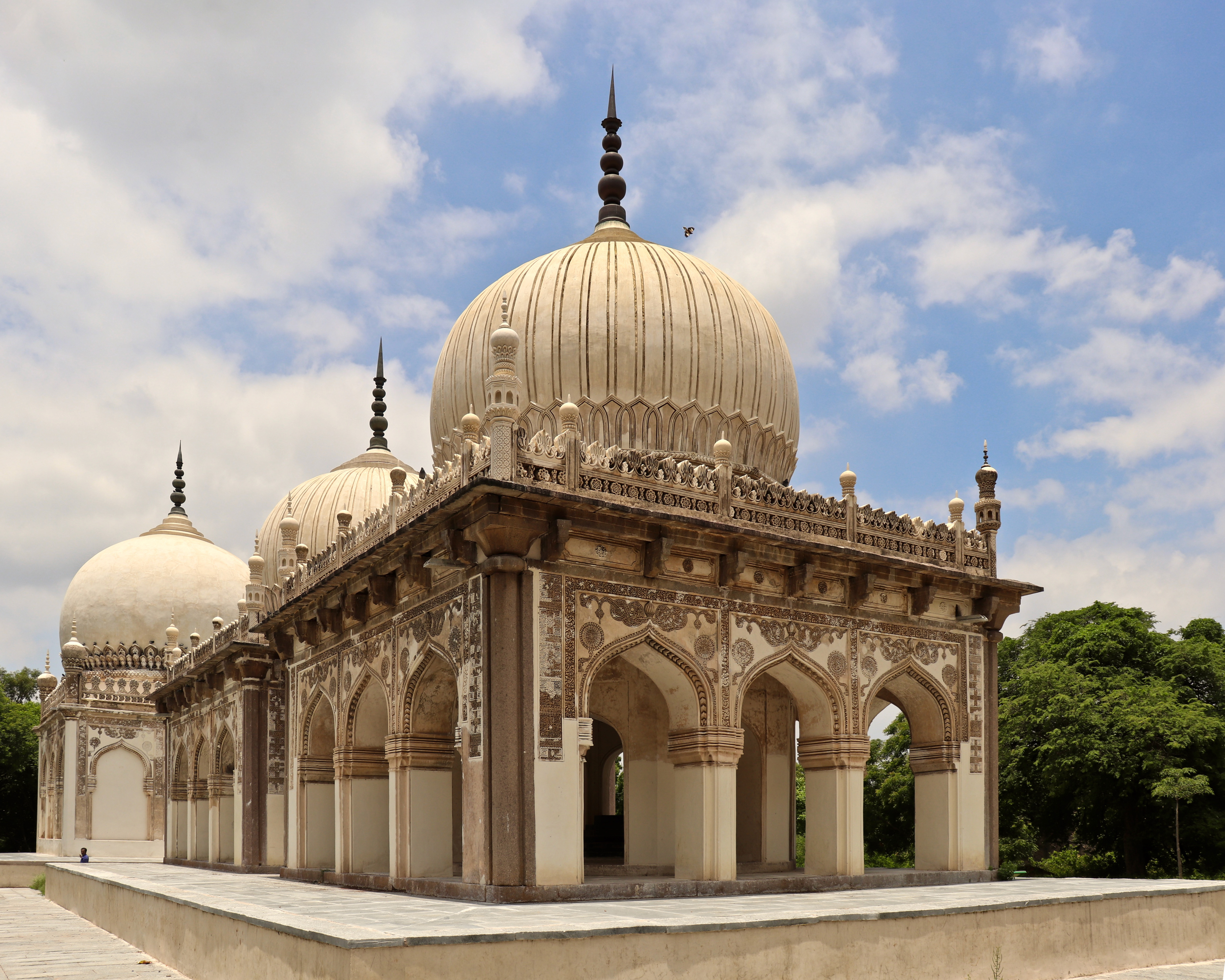
Tombs beside Tomb of Fatima Khanam

Amongst the major architectural works in the Bijapur Sultanate, one of the earliest is the unfinished Jami Masjid, which started construction by Ali Adil Shah I in 1576. It has an arcaded prayer hall, with fine aisles, and has an impressive dome supported by massive piers. One of the most impressive monuments built during the reign of Ibrahim II was the Ibrahim Rouza which was originally planned as a tomb for queen Taj Sultana, but was later converted into the tomb for Ibrahim Adil Shah II and his family. This complex, completed in 1626, consists of a paired tomb and mosque.

Notable buildings of the Bahmani and Deccan sultanates in the Deccan include the Charminar, Mecca Masjid, Qutb Shahi tombs, Madrasa Mahmud Gawan, and Gol Gumbaz.The greatest monument in Bijapur is the Gol Gumbaz, the mausoleum of Muhammad Adil Shah, which was completed in 1656, and whose hemispherical dome measures 44 metres (144 ft) across.

One of the earliest architectural achievements of the Qutb Shahi dynasty is the fortified city of Golconda, which is now in ruins. In the 16th century, Muhammad Quli Qutb Shah decided to shift the capital to Hyderabad, 8 kilometres (5.0 mi) east of Golconda. Here, he constructed the most original monument in the Deccan, the Charminar, in the heart of the new city. This monument, completed in 1591, has four minarets, each 56 metres (184 ft).

==== Bengal Sultanate ====
The architectural style of the Bengal Sultanate mostly used brick, with characteristic features being indigenous Bengali elements, such as curved roofs, corner towers and complex terracotta ornamentation. which were with blended. One feature in the sultanate was the relative absence of minarets. Many small and medium-sized medieval mosques, with multiple domes and artistic niche mihrabs, were constructed throughout the region.

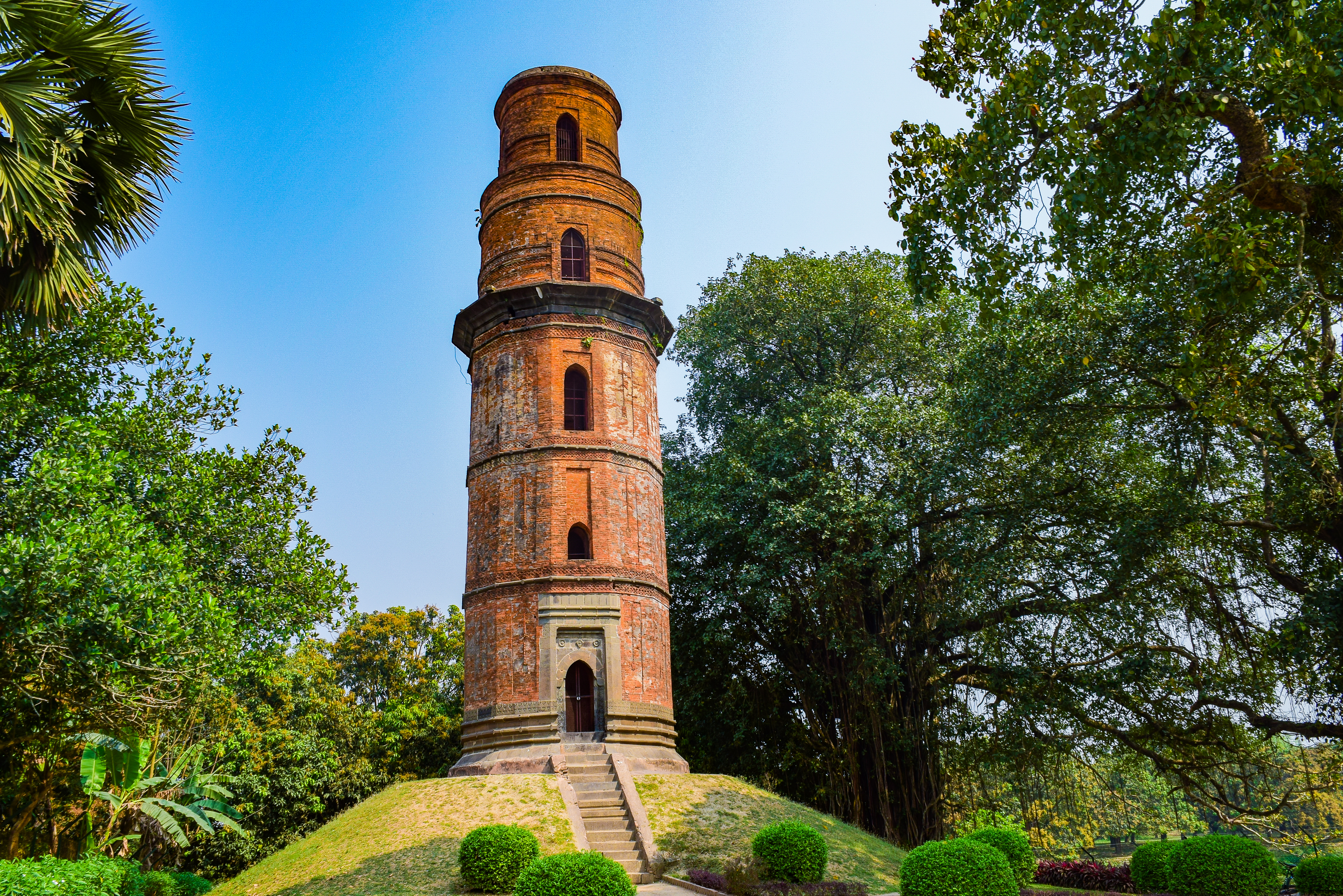
Firoze Minar at Gaur

These features are also seen in the Choto Sona Mosque (around 1500), which is in stone, unusually for Bengal, but shares the style and mixes domes and a curving "paddy" roof based on village house roofs made of vegetable thatch. Such roofs feature even more strongly in later Bengal Hindu temple architecture, with types of style such as the do-chala, Jor-bangla Style, and char-chala. For larger mosques, Bengali architects multiplied the numbers of domes, with a nine-domed formula (three rows of three) being one option, surviving in four examples, all 15th or 16th century and now in Bangladesh, although there were others with larger numbers of domes.

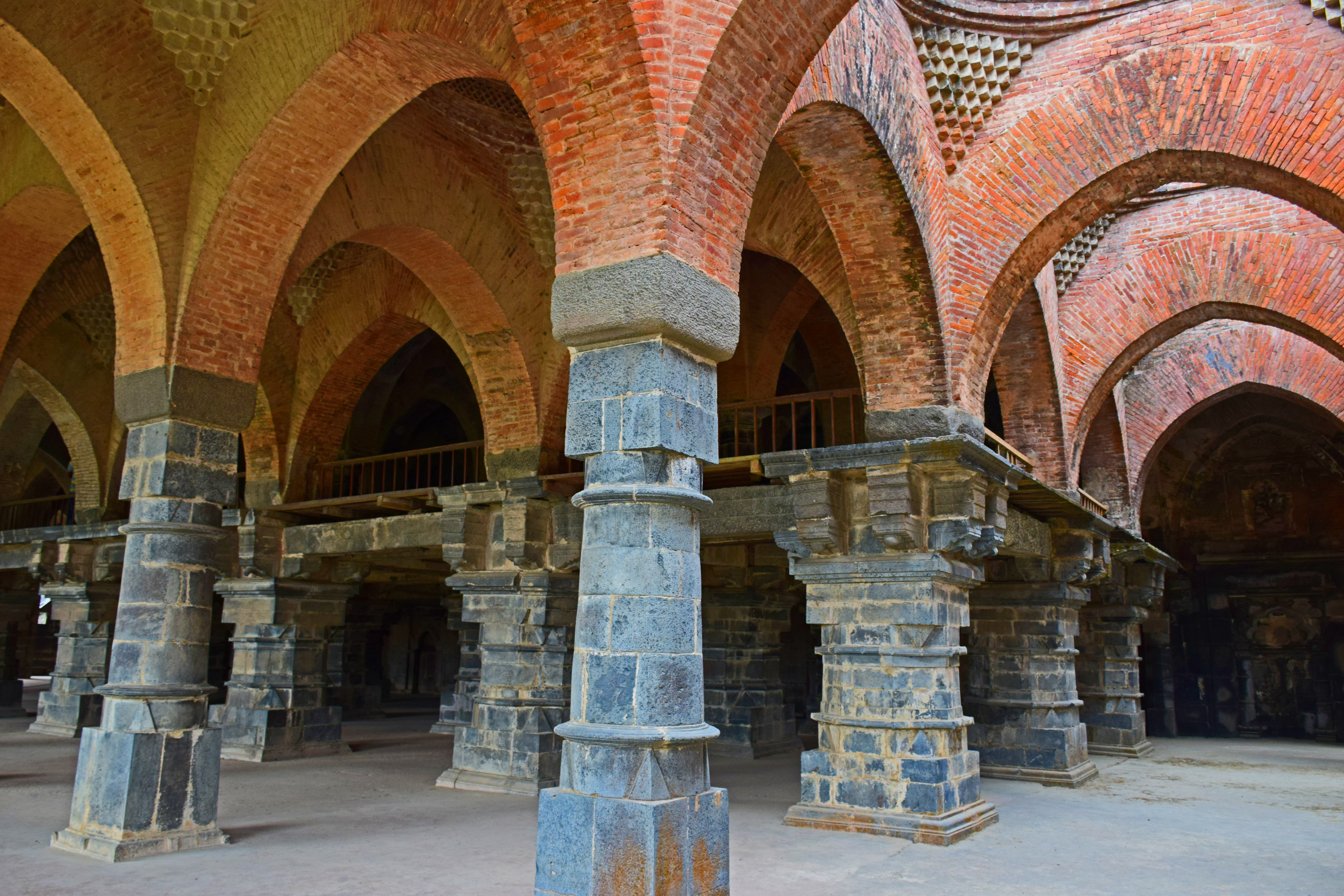
Interior of the hypostyle hall of the Adina Mosque

The largest mosque in the Indian subcontinent was the 14th century Adina Mosque. Built of stone demolished from temples, it featured a monumental ribbed barrel vault over the central nave, the first such giant vault used anywhere in the subcontinent. The mosque was modelled on the imperial Sassanian style of Persia. The Sultanate style flourished between the 14th and 16th centuries. A provincial style influenced by North India evolved in Mughal Bengal during the 17th and 18th centuries. The Mughals also copied the Bengali do-chala roof tradition for mausoleums in North India.

Although the description in Pandua, the ancient capital, shows mainly Persian culture in courts, we find one of the first attempts at fusing together the Islamic and Bengali style of architecture under the Ilyas Shahi dynasty who ruled then. Under Jalaludin, emerged the 'Bengal' style of mosques. With Jalaludin's reign we see the beginnings of a trend of Muslim ruling dynasty that grounded itself in local culture rather than seeking legitimacy from Delhi or Mecca. Upon his return to Delhi from his first Bengal expedition, Firoz Shah Tughlaq built Kotla Mosque, which bear a striking resemblance to the Bengal style.

==== Kashmir ====
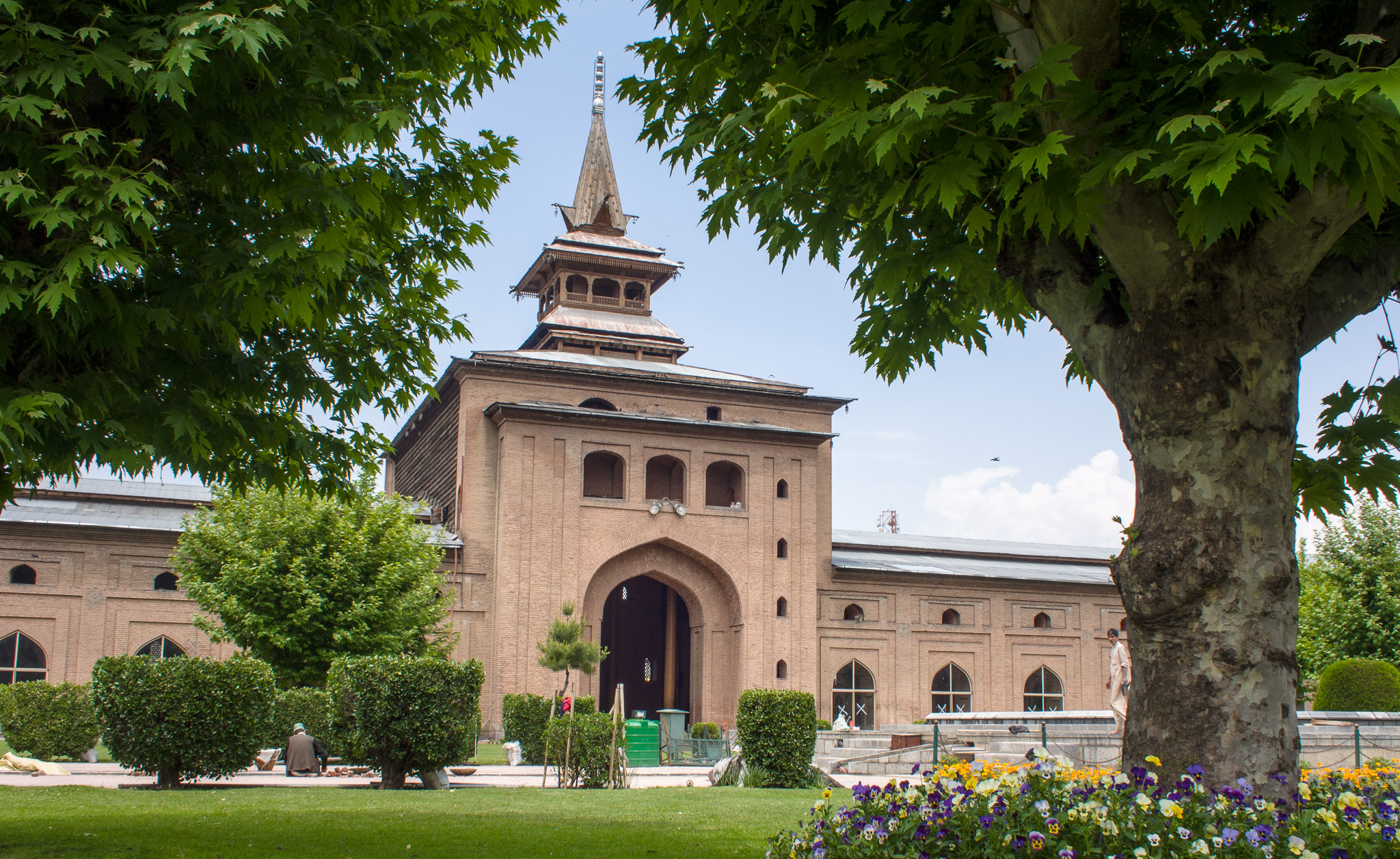
Jamia Masjid, Srinagar

By 1339, Shams-ud-din Shah Mir of the Shah Mir dynasty established a sultanate encompassing the region of Kashmir (consisting of modern-day Gilgit-Baltistan, Azad Kashmir, Jammu and Kashmir, Ladakh, and Aksai Chin), allowing for the gradual Islamization of the region and the hybridization of Persianate culture and architecture with the indigenous Buddhist styles of Kashmir. In the capital at Srinagar in modern Indian-administered Kashmir, Sikandar Shah Mir constructed the Jamia Masjid, a large wooden congregational mosque that incorporates elements two cultures, that is, it has been erected in Persian style but its minar is topped with umbrella-shaped finial, which is in similitude with Buddhist pagoda structure, as well as the wooden Khanqah-e-Moulah mosque. Also, in Srinagar, are the Aali Masjid and the Tomb of Zain-ul-Abidin. Two 14th-century wooden mosques in Gilgit-Baltistan are the Chaqchan Mosque in Khaplu (1370) and the Amburiq Mosque in Shigar. Both have stone-built cores with elaborately carved wooden exterior galleries, at Amburiq on two levels, in an adaptation of traditional local styles.

==== Gujarat Sultanate ====
Gujarat Sultanate

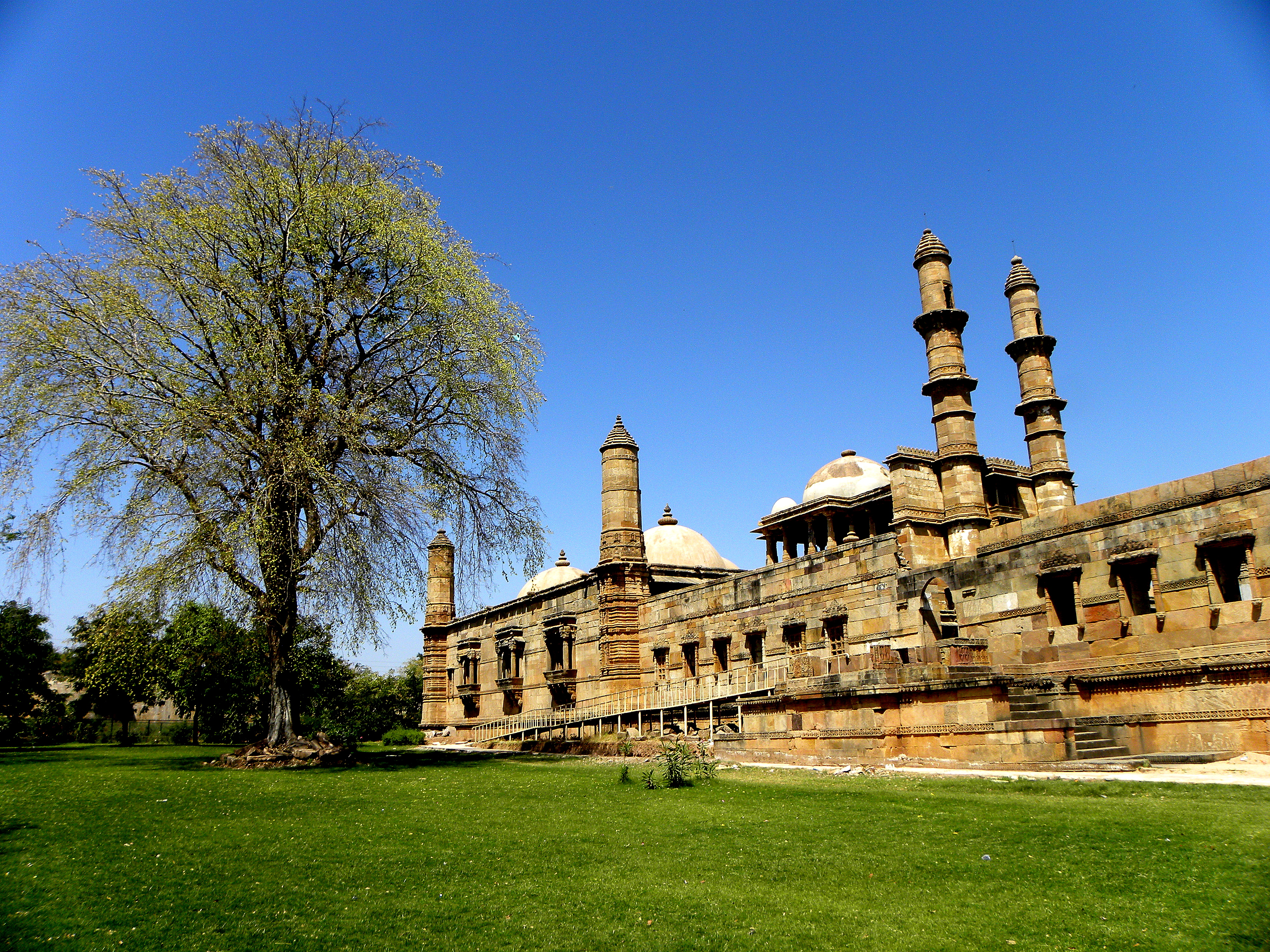
Jami Masjid, Champaner

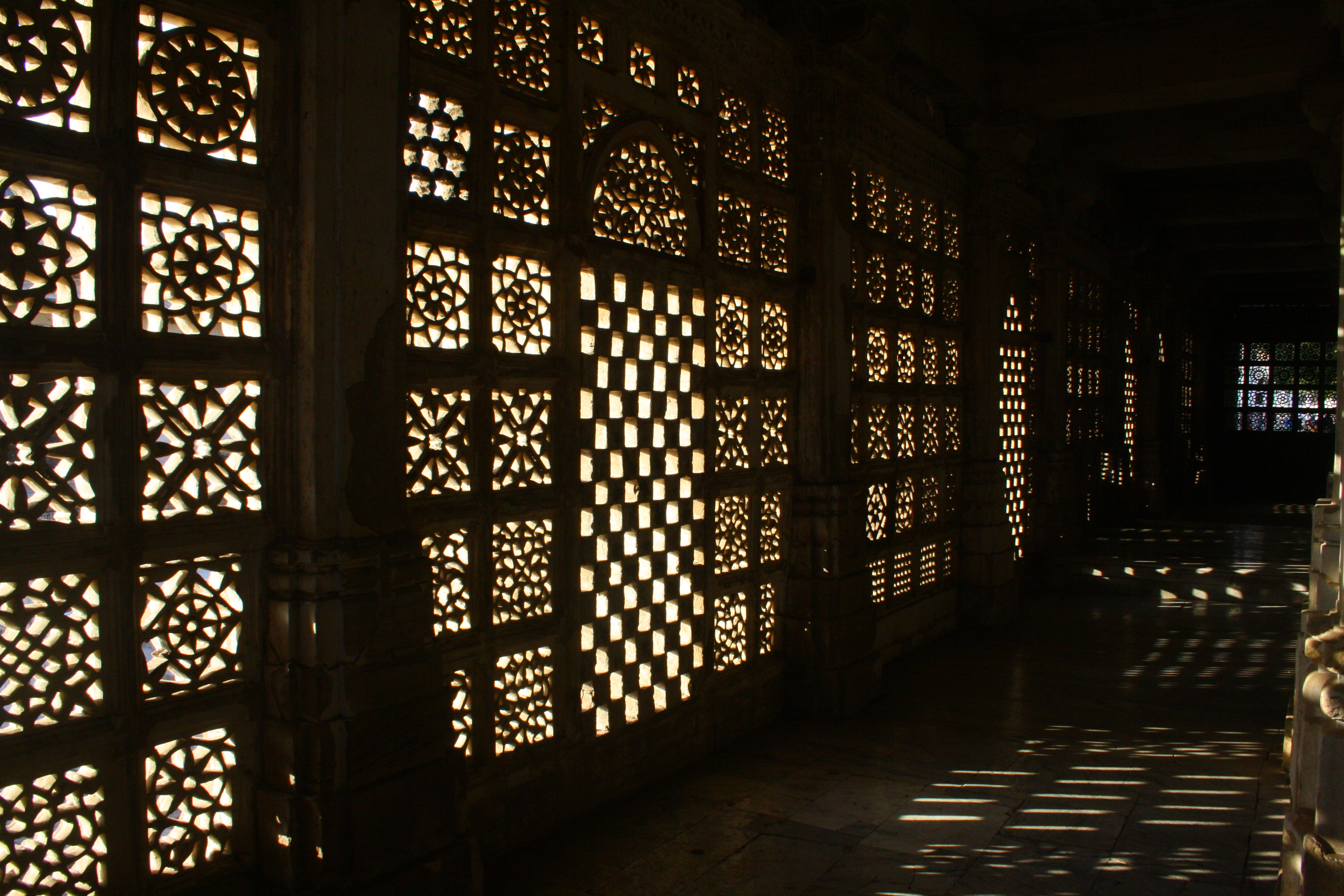
Jaali work at Sarkhej Roza

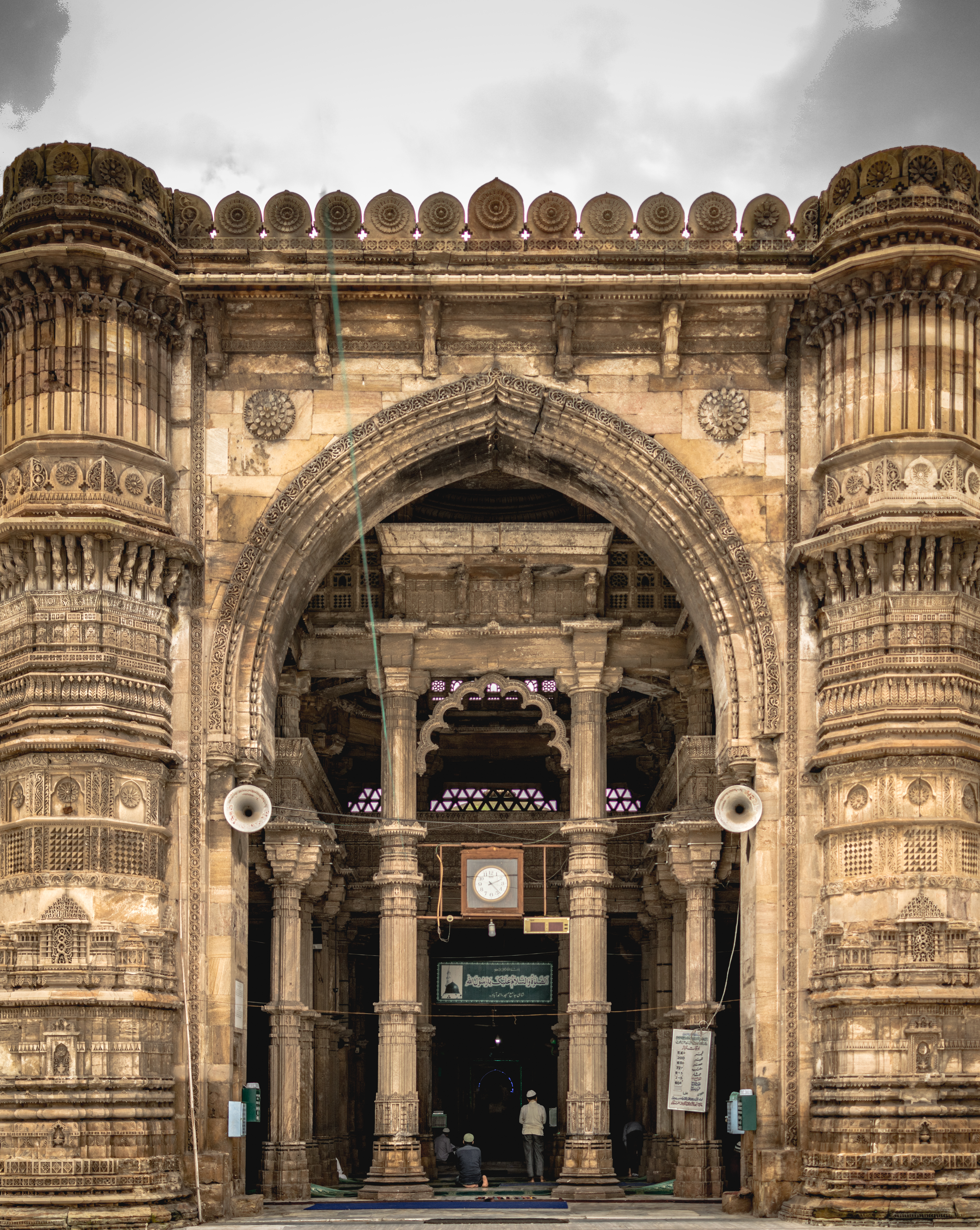
Jama Masjid, Ahmedabad

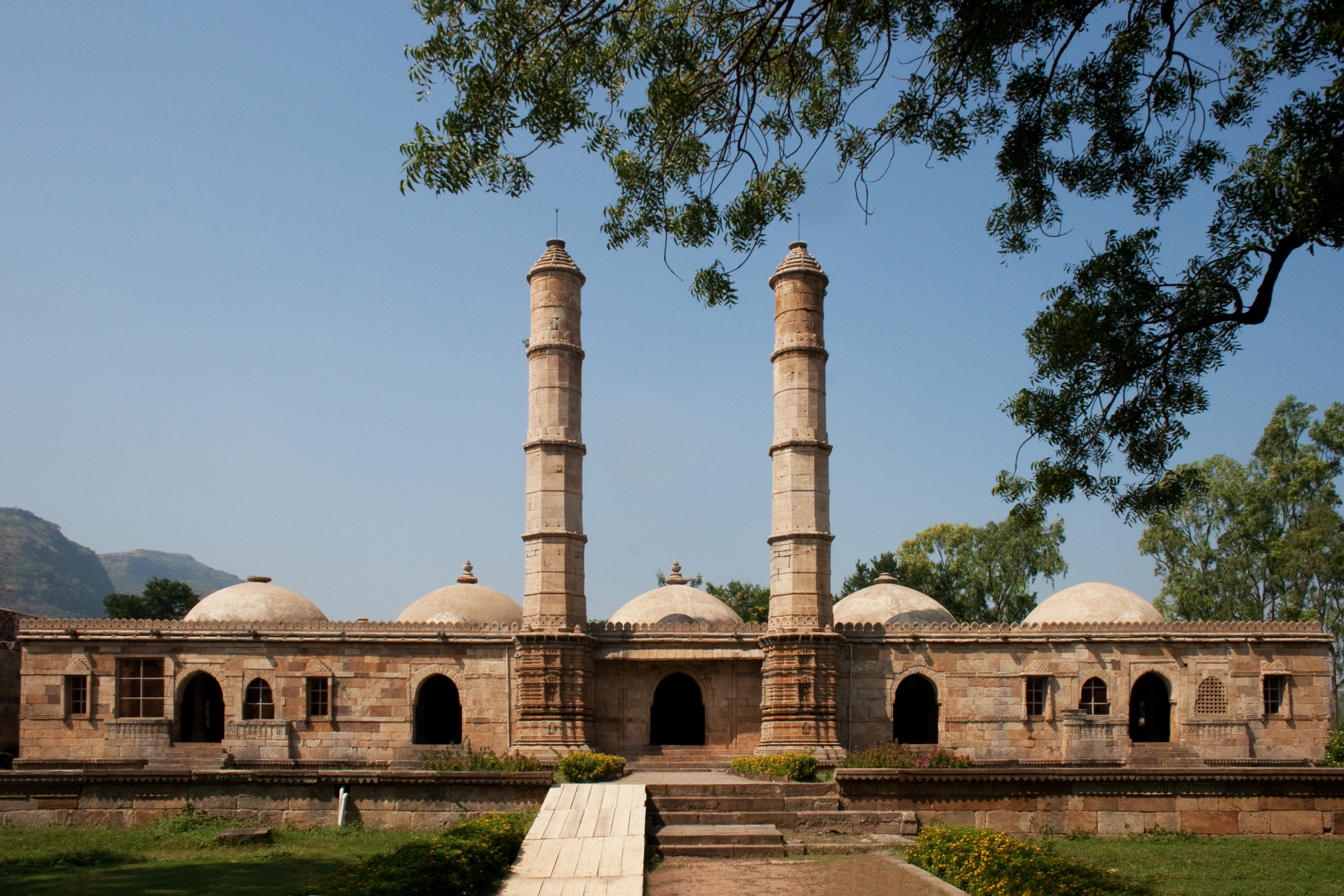
Saher ki Masjid

Under the Gujarat Sultanate, independent between 1407 and 1543, Gujarat was a prosperous regional sultanate under the rule of the Muzaffarid dynasty, who built lavishly, particularly in the capital, Ahmedabad, in its distinctive style of Indo-Islamic architecture. The sultanate commissioned mosques such as the Jami Masjid of Ahmedabad, Jama Masjid at Champaner, Jami Masjid at Khambhat, Qutbuddin Mosque, Rani Rupamati Mosque, Sarkhej Roza, Sidi Bashir Mosque, Kevada Mosque, Sidi Sayyed Mosque, Nagina Mosque and Pattharwali Masjid, as well as structures such as Teen Darwaza, Bhadra Fort and the Dada Harir Stepwell in Ahmedabad.

The distinctive Indo-Islamic architecture style of Gujarat drew micro-architectural elements from earlier Maru-Gurjara architecture and employed them in mihrab, roofs, doors, minarets and facades. In the 15th century, the Indo-Islamic style of Gujarat is especially notable for its inventive and elegant use of minarets. They are often in pairs flanking the main entrance, mostly rather thin and with elaborate carving at least at the lower levels. Some designs push out balconies at intervals up the shaft; the most extreme version of this was in the lost upper parts of the so-called "shaking minarets" at the Jama Mosque, Ahmedabad, which fell down in an earthquake in 1819. This carving draws on the traditional skills of local stone-carvers, previously exercised on Hindu temples in the Māru-Gurjara and other local styles.

Indo-Islamic architecture style of Gujarat presages many of the architectural elements later found in Mughal architecture, including ornate mihrabs and minarets, jali (perforated screens carved in stone), and chattris (pavilions topped with cupolas).

The Champaner-Pavagadh Archaeological Park, the 16th century capital of Gujarat Sultanate, documents the early Islamic and pre-Mughal city that has remained without any change.

=== Mughal Empire ===
The most famous Indo-Islamic style is Mughal architecture. Mughal art and architecture, a characteristic Indo-Islamic-Persian style flourished on the Indian subcontinent during the Mughal Empire (1526–1857). Its most prominent examples are the series of imperial mausolea, which started with the pivotal Tomb of Humayun, but is best known for the Taj Mahal.

Mughal elements

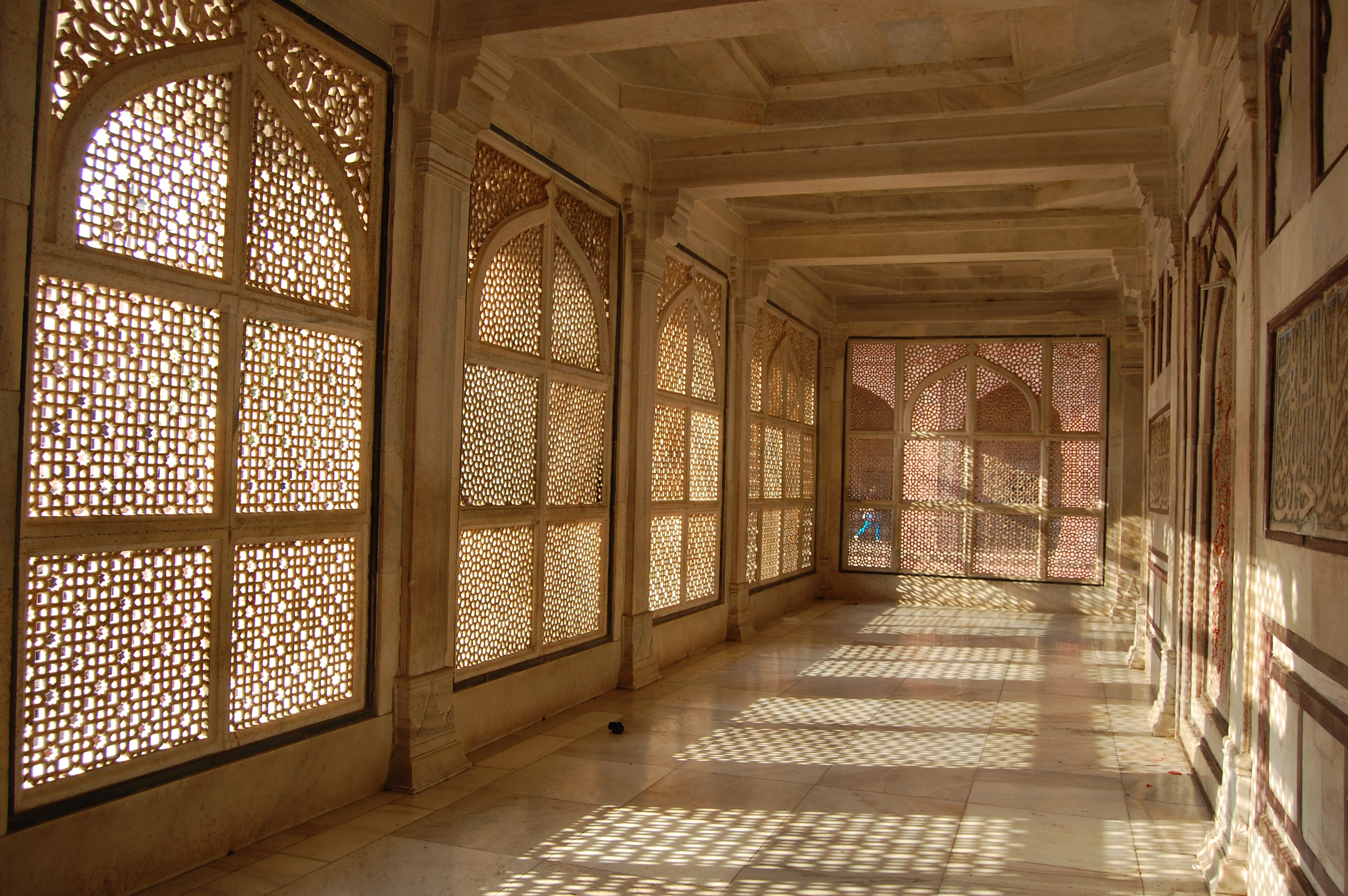
The Tomb of Salim Chishti and jali latticed screens is famed as one of the finest examples of Mughal architecture in India.

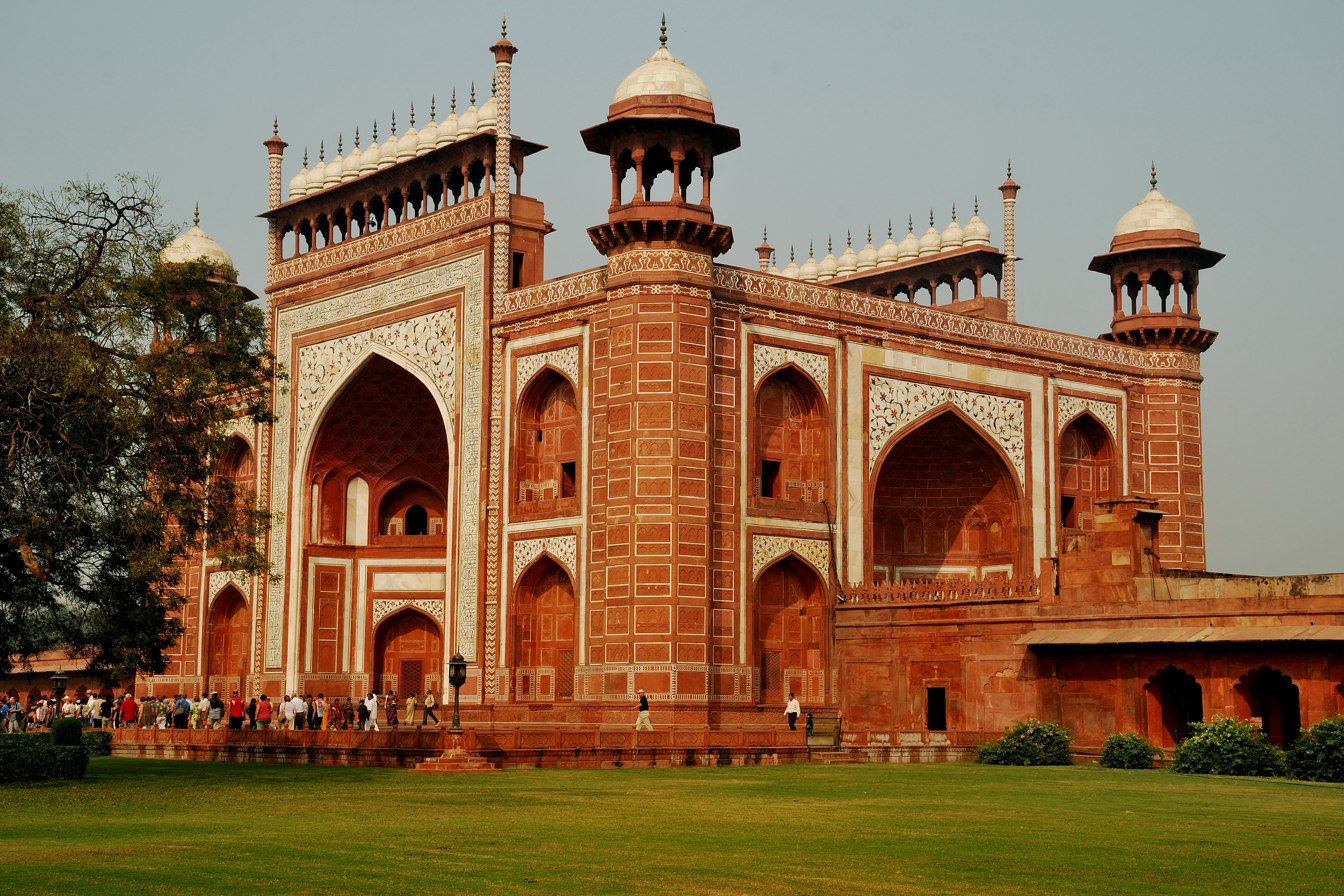
Darwaza-I-Rauza, Taj Mahal Complex, showing large vaulted gateways with delicate ornamentation and minarets with cupolas

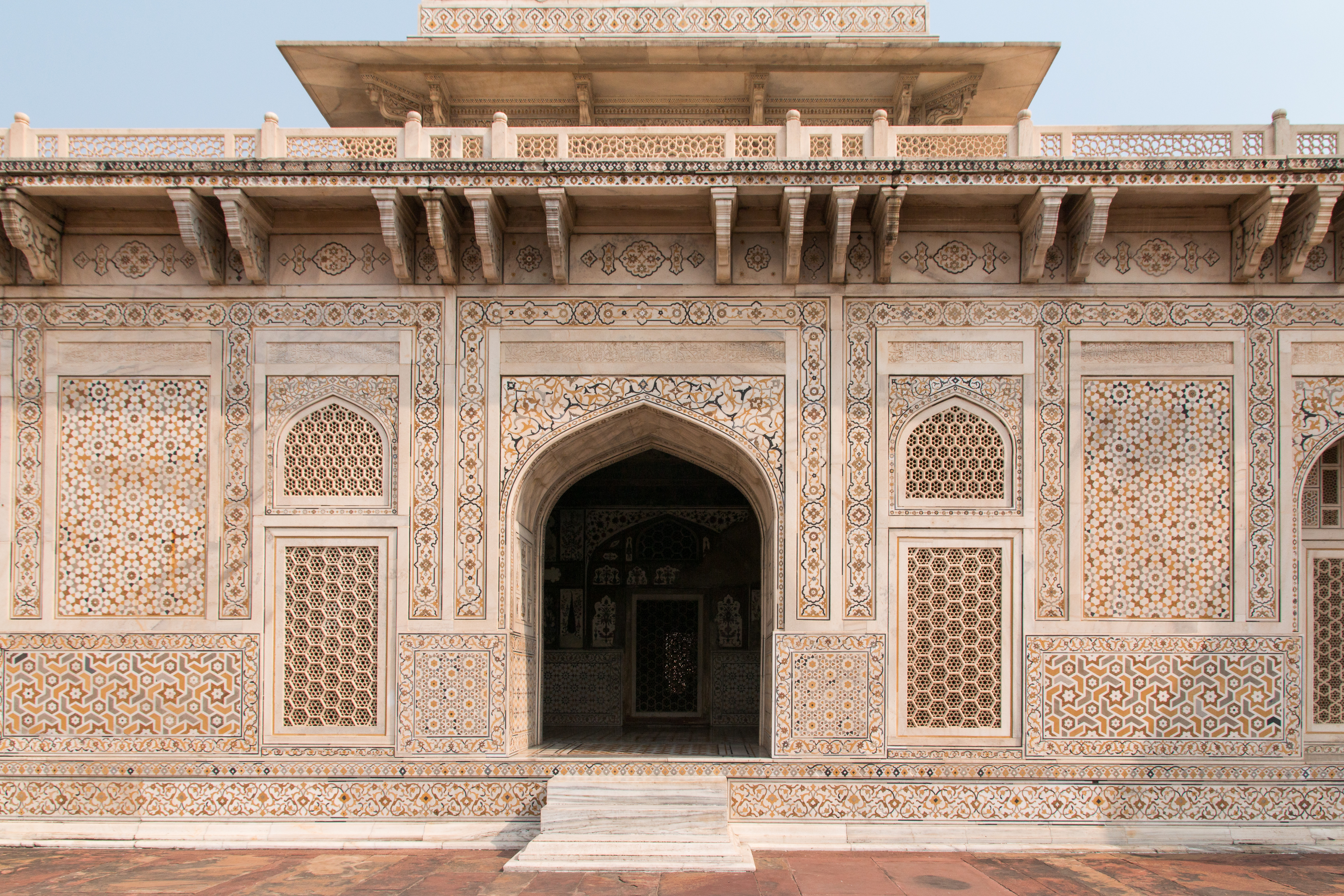
Pachin Kari or Pietra Dura on Tomb of I'timād-ud-Daulah

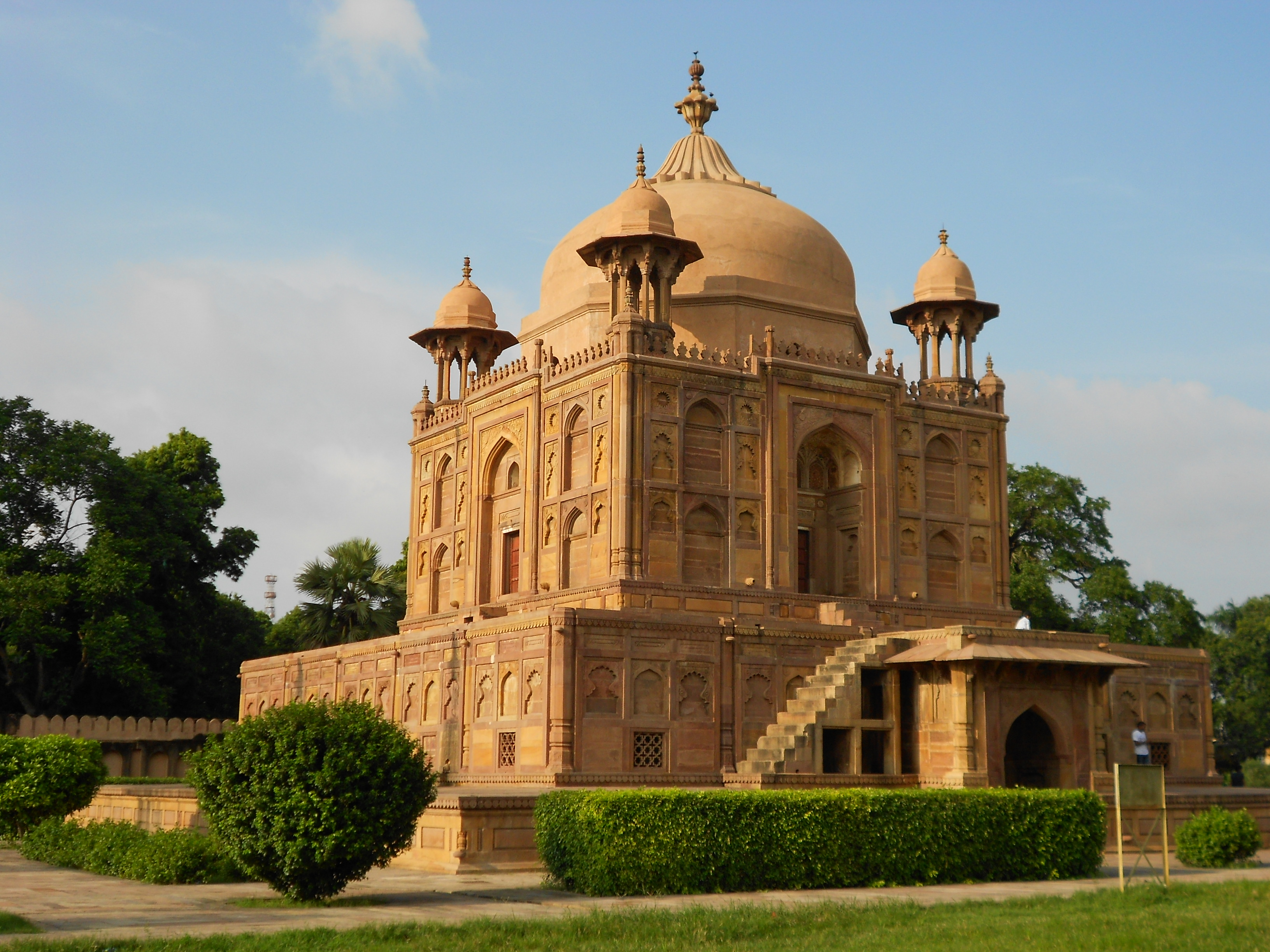
Bulbous domes on Tomb of Nisar Begum at Khusro Bagh

Mughal architecture is known for features including monumental buildings with large, bulbous onion domes, surrounded by gardens on all four sides, and delicate ornamentation work, including pachin kari decorative work and jali-latticed screens. Pietra dura or ‘Parchinkari’ rose to prominence under patronage of Emperors specially under Shah Jahan. Originating from Italy, it found its way to Mughal courts via trade routes. It adapted to its present distinct feature of floral art by the hands of local artisans and Persian influence.

The Mughals brought in Persian style into Indian architecture. The character and structure of Mughal buildings displayed a uniform character and structure. Some of the main features of the Mughal architecture are mentioned below.

1. Large halls
2. Very large vaulted gateways
3. Delicate ornamentation
4. Bulbous domes
5. Slender Minarets with cupolas at the 4 corners

The Red Fort at Agra (1565–74) and the walled city of Fatehpur Sikri (1569–74) are among the architectural achievements of this time—as is the Taj Mahal, built as a tomb for Mumtaz Mahal by Shah Jahan (1628–58). Employing the double dome, the recessed archway, the depiction of any animal or human—an essential part of the Indian tradition—was forbidden in places of worship under Islam.

Mughal architecture reached its zenith during the reign of the emperor Shah Jahan, its crowning achievement being the magnificent Taj Mahal. This period is marked by a fresh emergence in India of Persian features that had been seen earlier in the tomb of Humayun. The use of the double dome, a recessed archway inside a rectangular fronton, and parklike surroundings are all typical of this period. Symmetry and balance between the parts of a building were always stressed, while the delicacy of detail in Shah Jahan decorative work has seldom been surpassed.

The Taj Mahal does contain tilework of plant ornaments. The architecture during the Mughal period, with its rulers being of Turco-Mongol origin, has shown a notable blend of Indian style combined with the Islamic architecture. The Taj Mahal in Agra is one of the wonders of the world.

Mughal gardens are gardens built by the Mughals in the Islamic style. This style was influenced by Persian gardens. They are built in the charbagh structure, which is a quadrilateral garden layout based on the four gardens of Paradise mentioned in the Qur'an. This style is intended to create a representation of an earthly utopia in which humans co-exist in perfect harmony with all elements of nature.

The quadrilateral garden is divided by walkways or flowing water into four smaller parts. Significant use of rectilinear layouts are made within the walled enclosures. Some of the typical features include pools, fountains and canals inside the gardens.

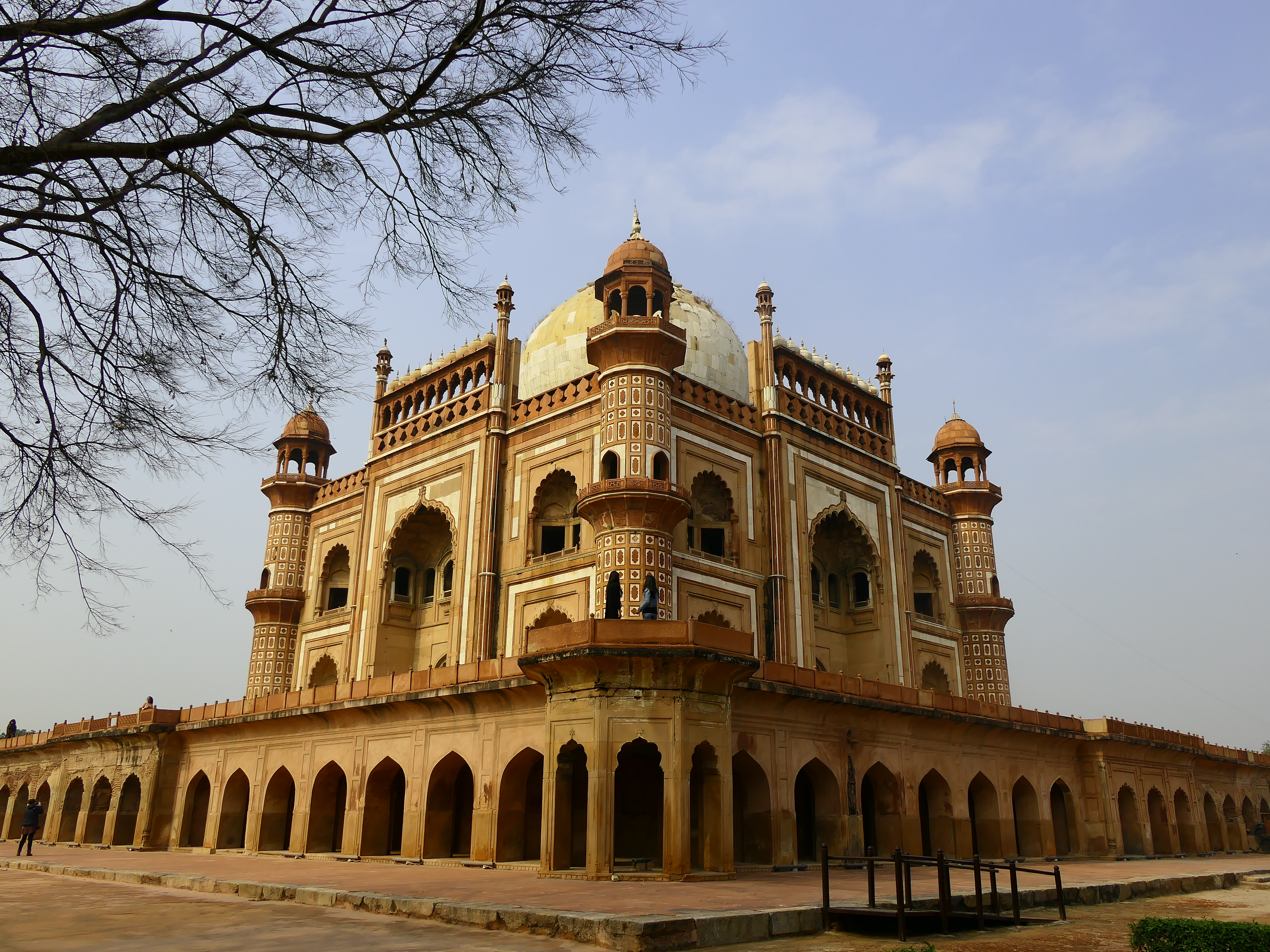
Safdarjung's Tomb is built in the late Mughal style for Nawab Safdarjung. The tomb is described as the "last flicker in the lamp of Mughal architecture".

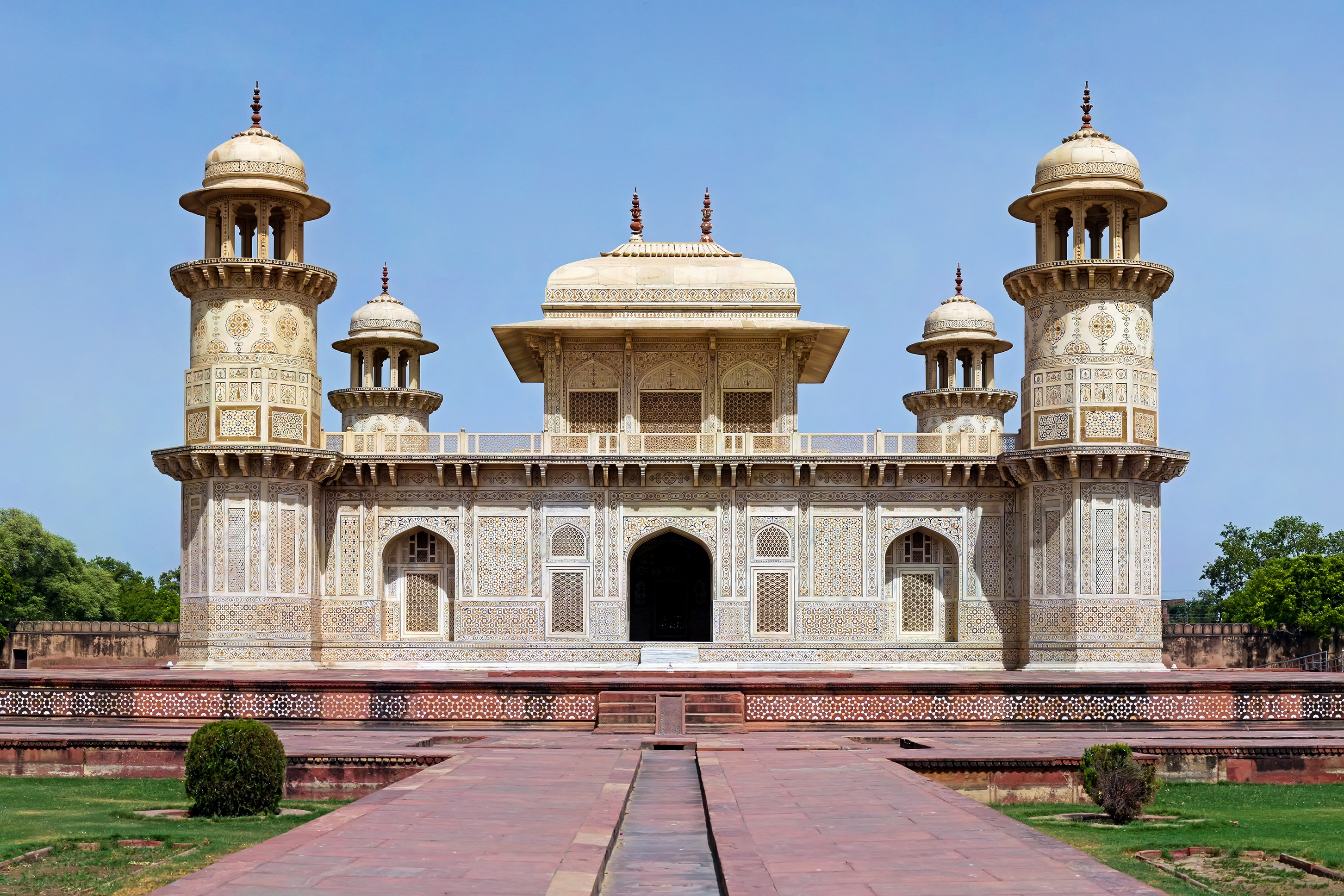
Tomb of I'timād-ud-Daulah is a Mughal mausoleum in Agra. It is noticeable for the first use of pietra dura technique. The tomb is often regarded as a draft of the Taj Mahal.

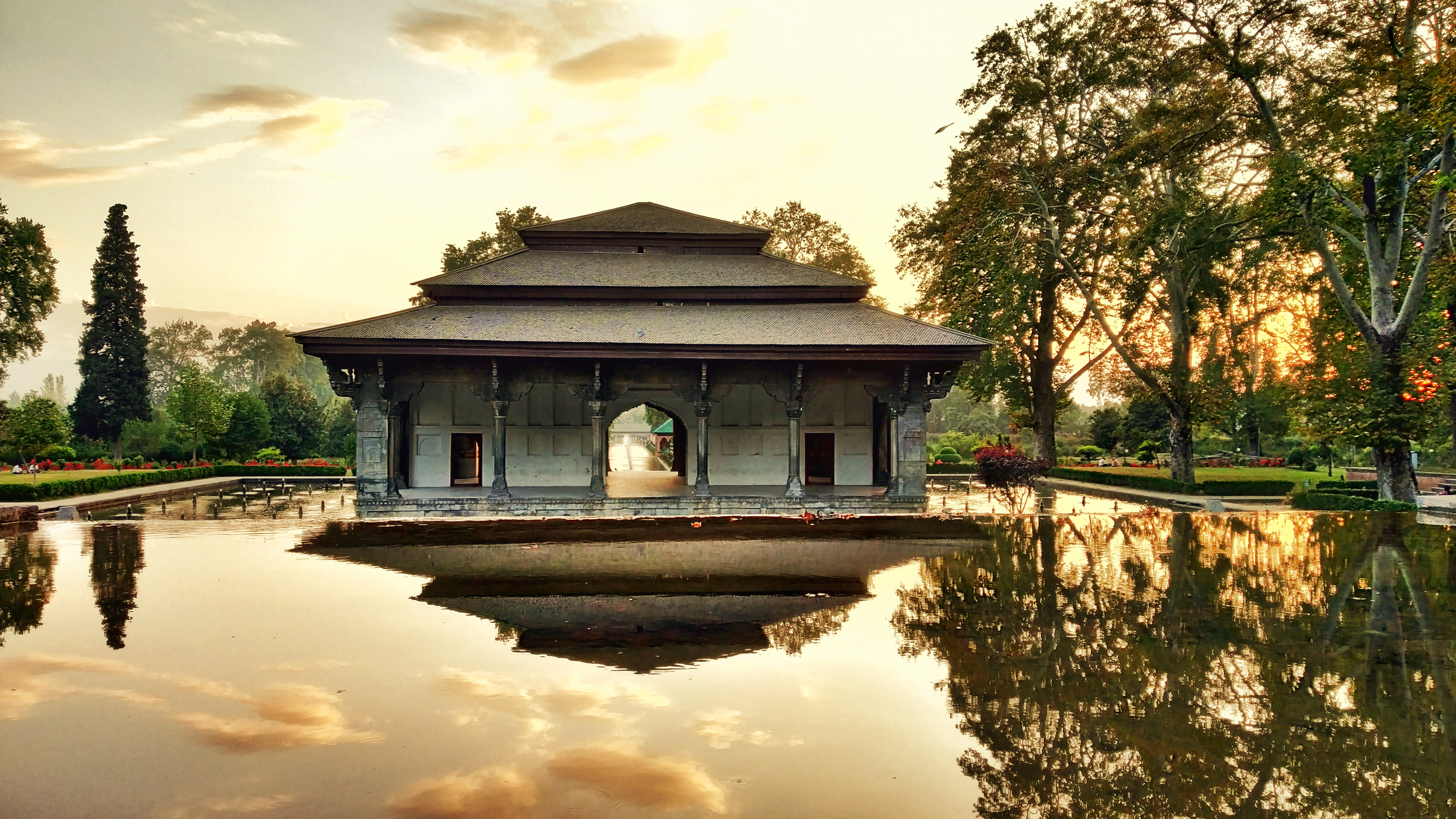
Shalimar Bagh is a Mughal garden in Srinagar, linked through a channel to the northeast of Dal Lake. The Bagh is considered the high point of Mughal horticulture.

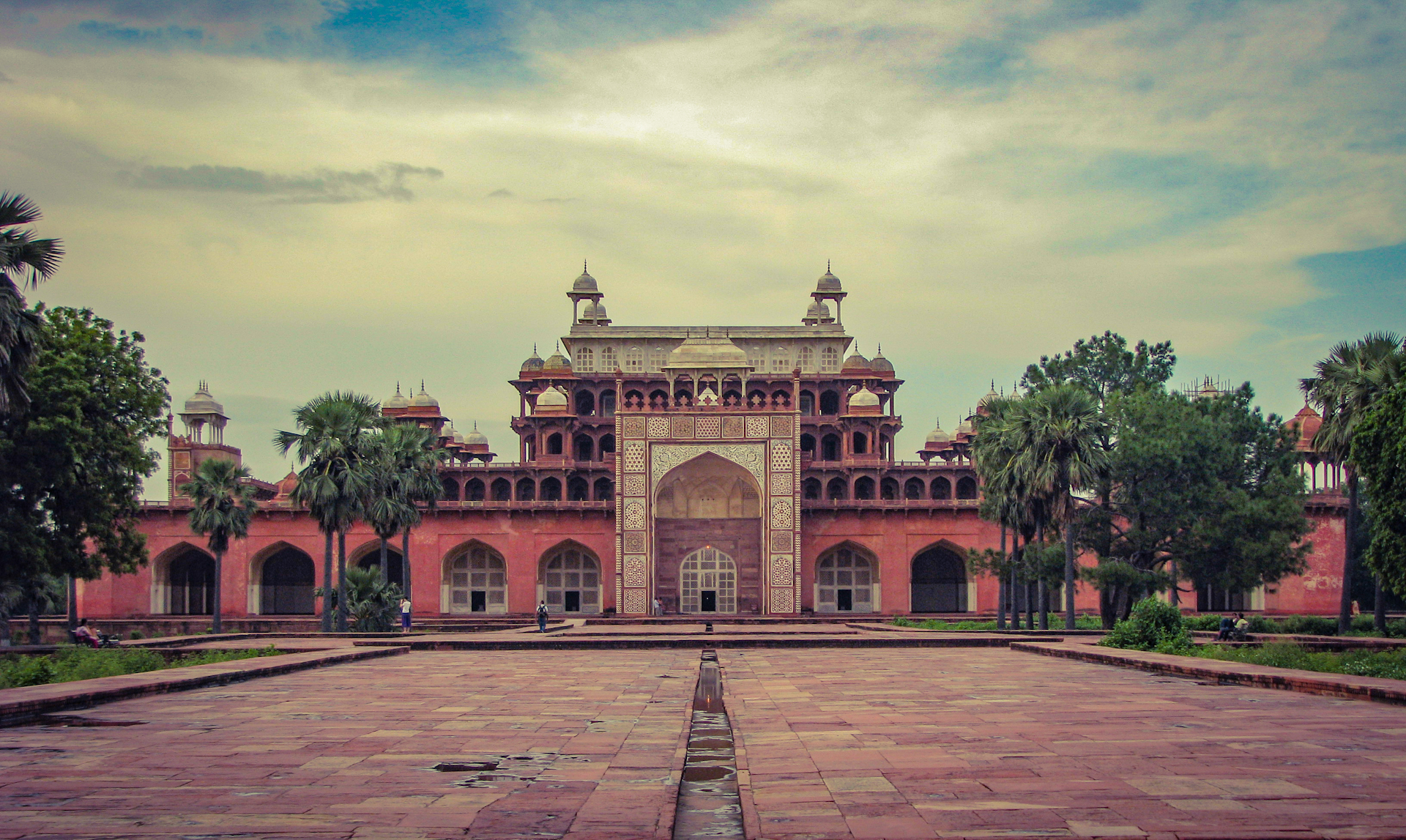
Akbar's Tomb, Agra was built with red sandstone by his son and grandson in 1605 to 1618.

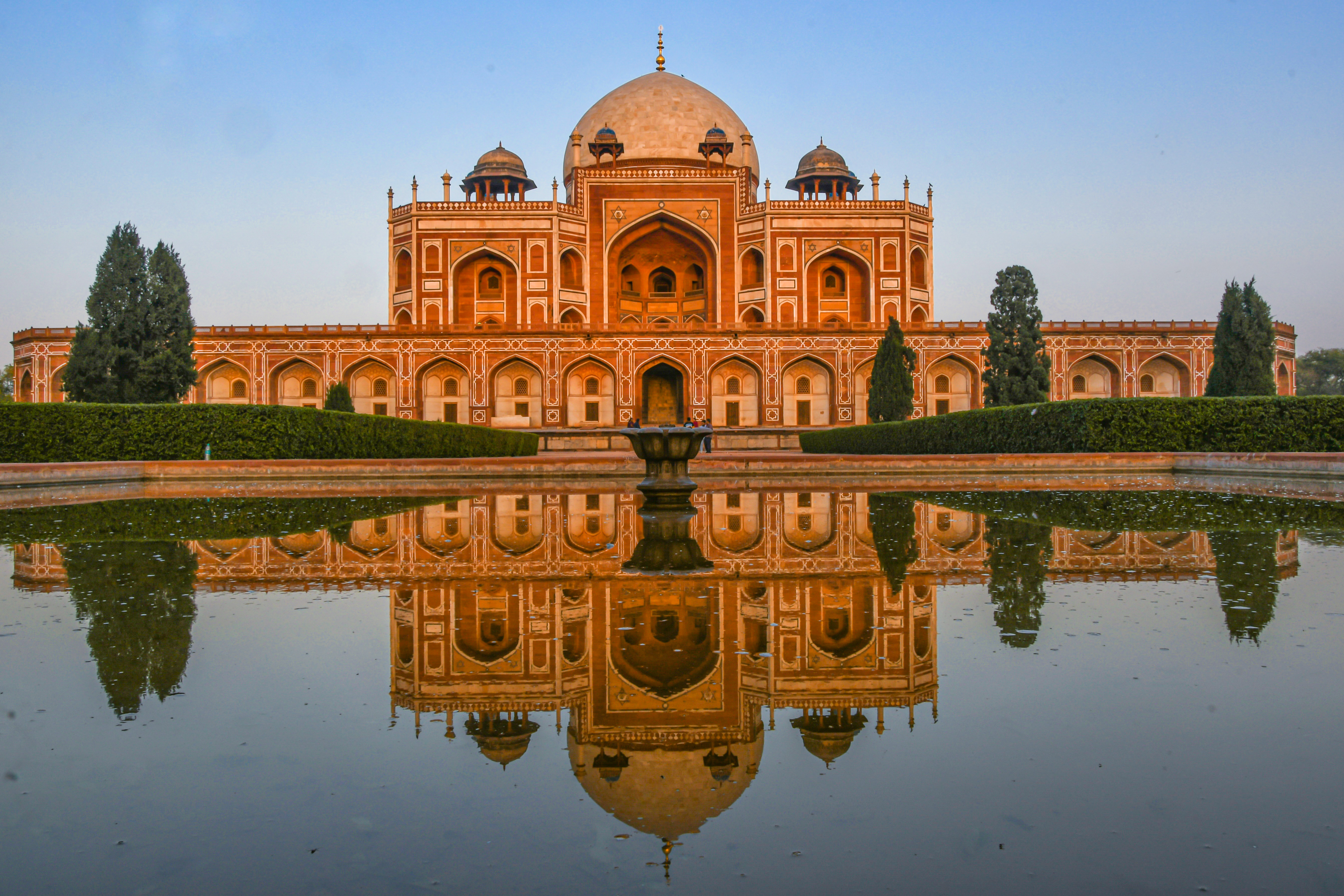
Humayun's Tomb, Delhi, the first fully developed Mughal imperial tomb, 1569–70 CE

== Regional styles ==
=== Rajput Architecture ===
Rajput elements

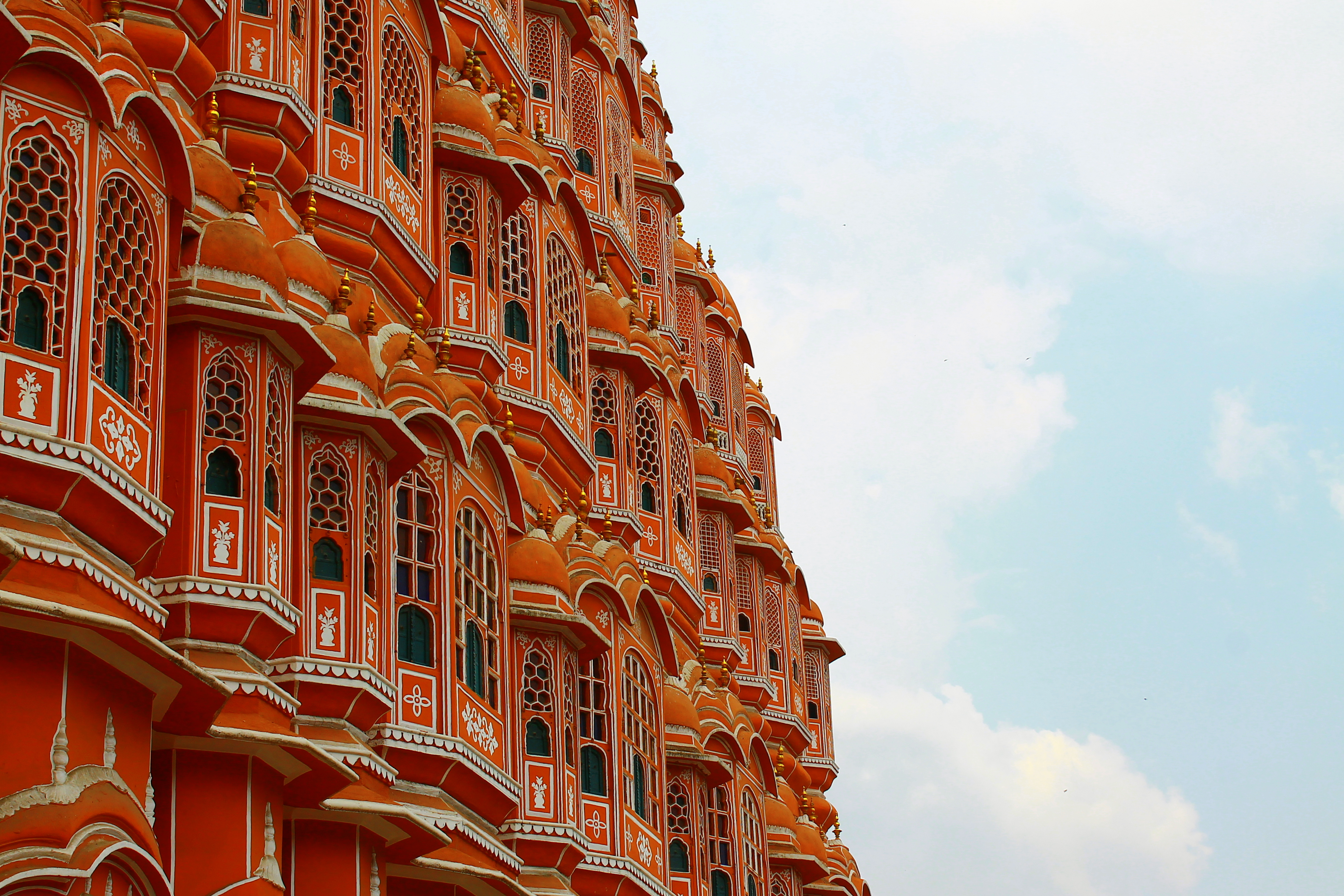
Jharokha windows of Hawa Mahal

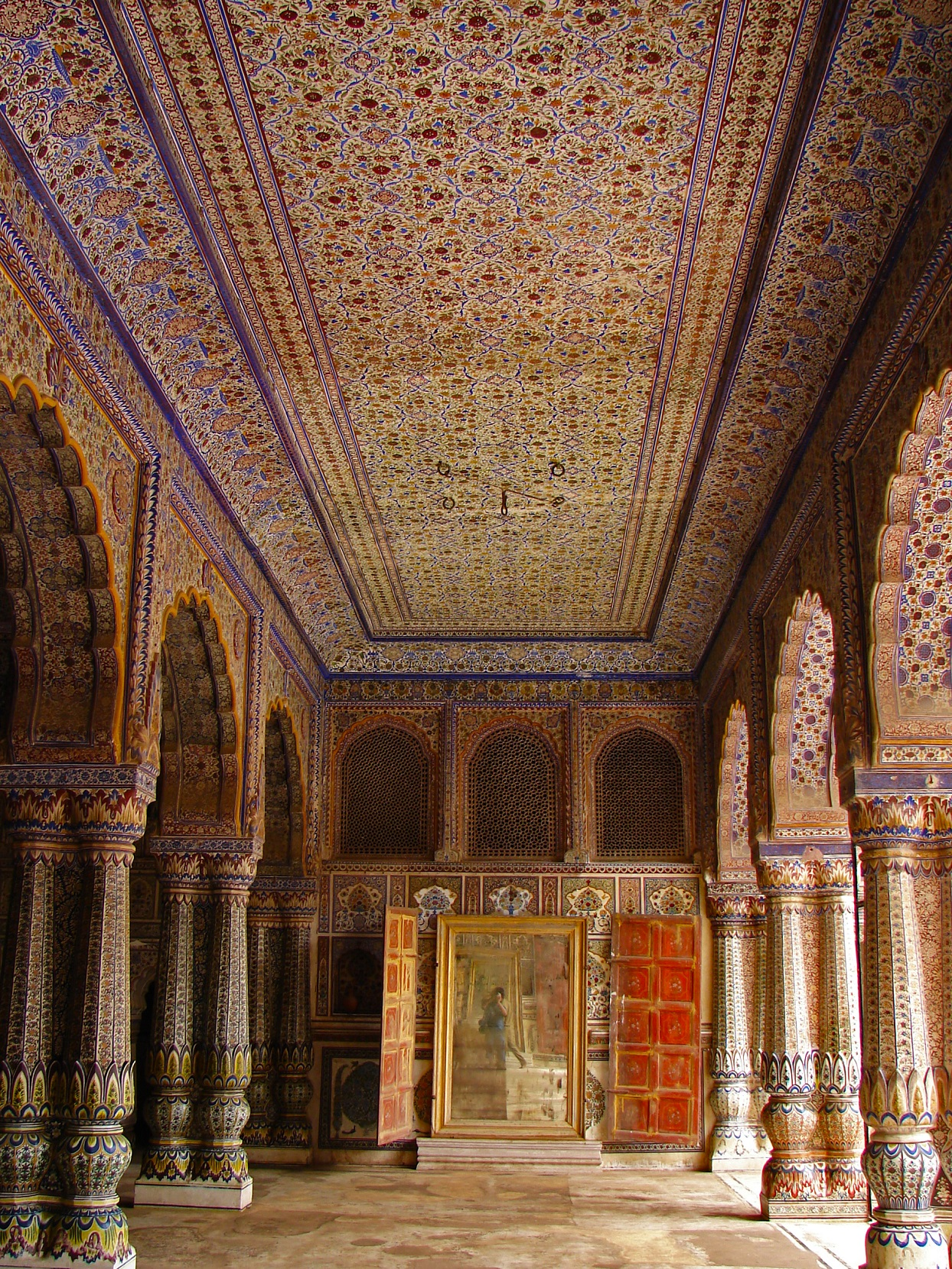
Profusely painted interiors Jal Mahal

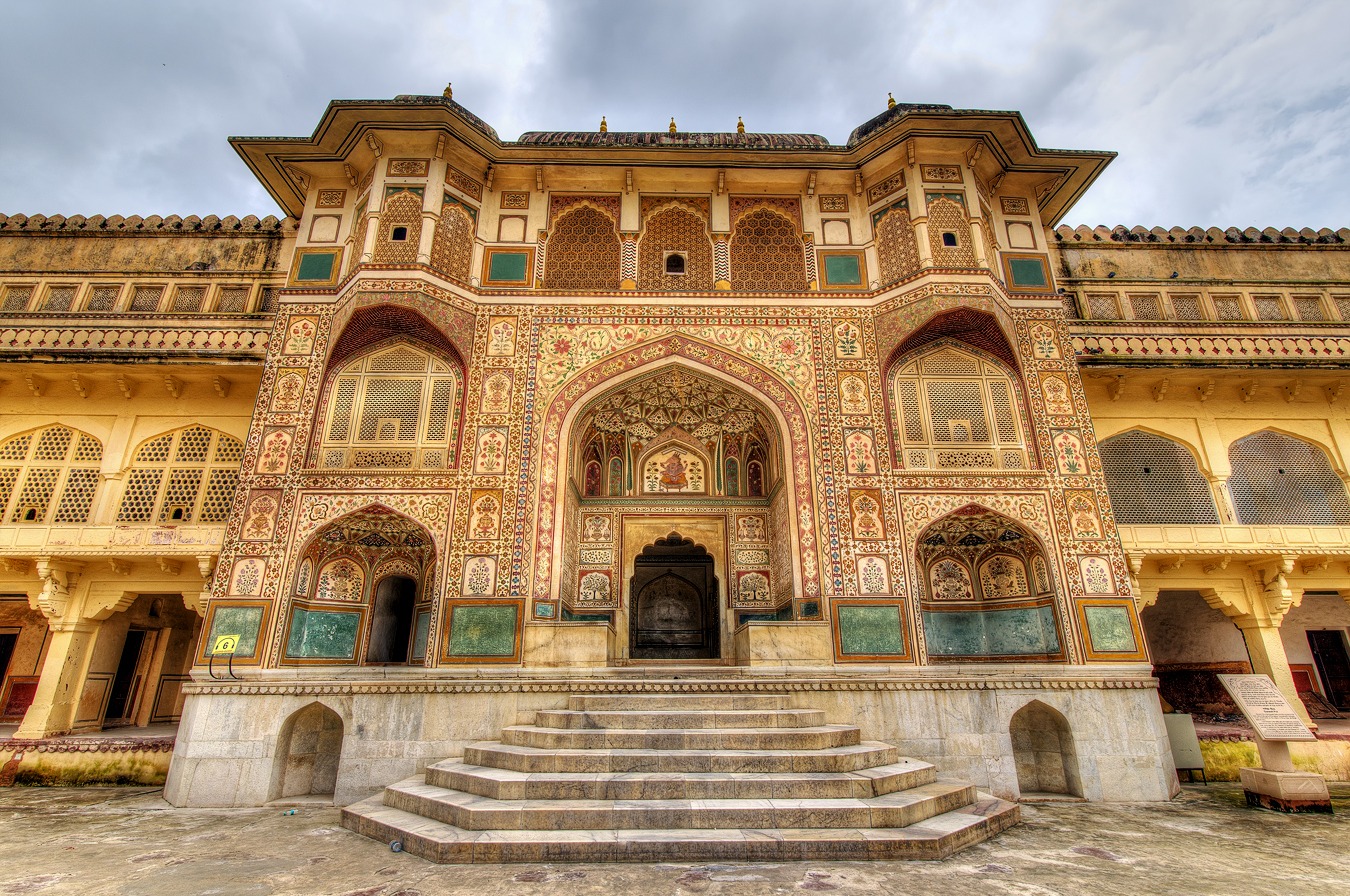
Pietra Dura and Jaali works on Amer Fort Entrance

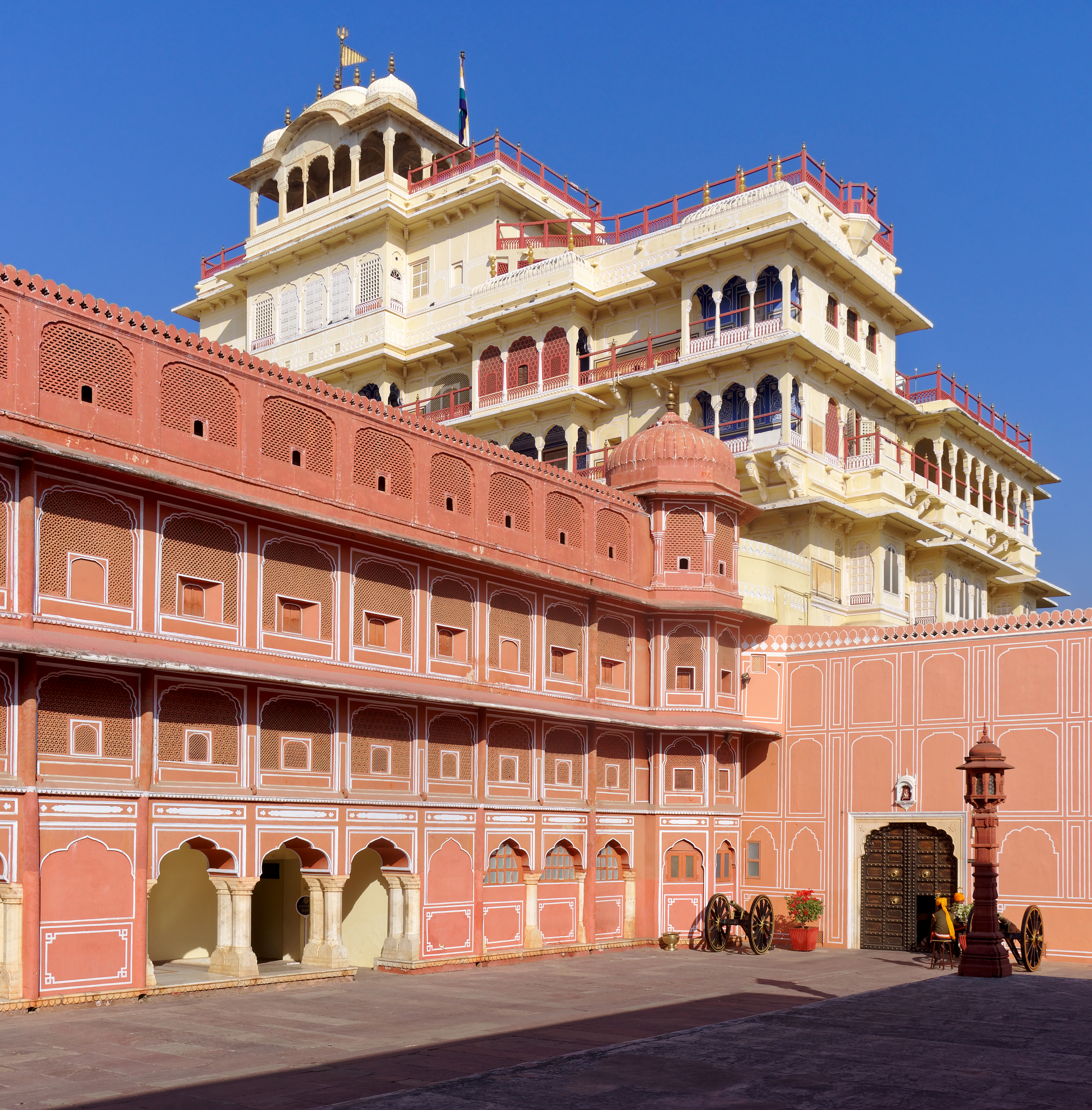
Chandra Mahal showcasing fusion of Rajput and Mughal styles

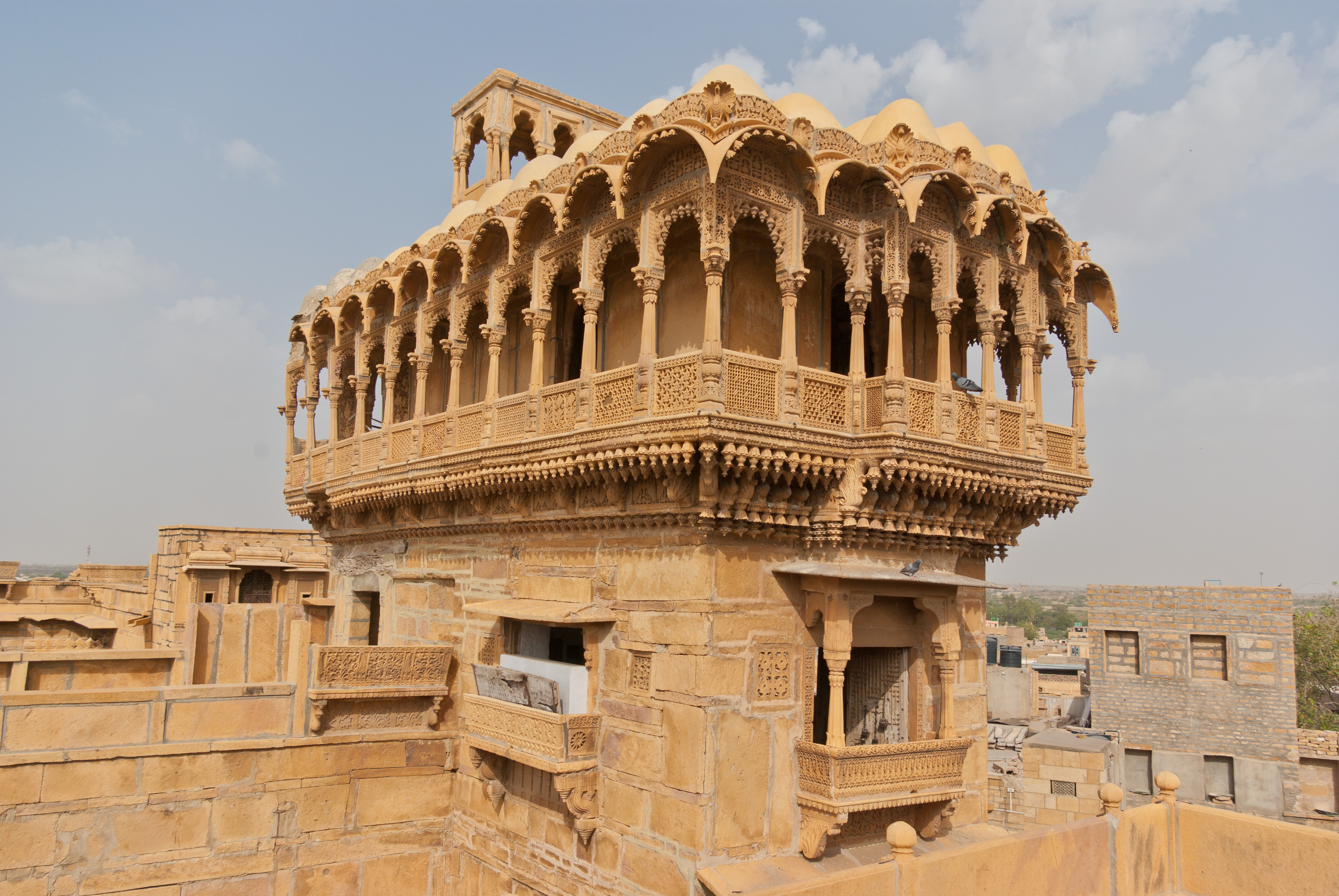
Salim Singh ki Haveli

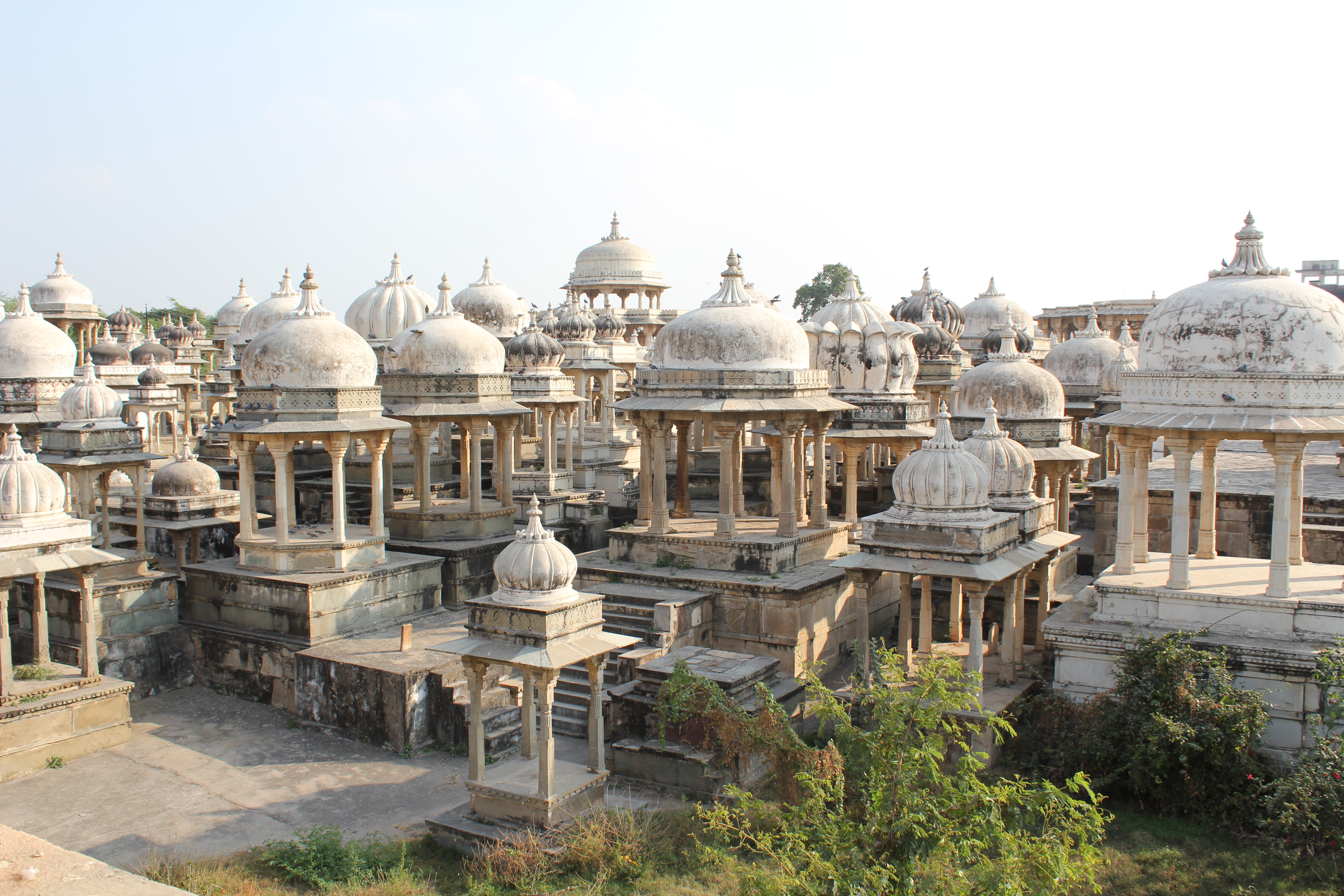
Chhatris in Udaipur

Rajput architecture represents different types of buildings, which may broadly be classed either as secular or religious. The secular buildings are of various scales. These include temples, forts, stepwells, gardens, and palaces. The forts were specially built for defense and military purposes due to the Islamic invasions.

The Hill Forts of Rajasthan (Amer, Chittor, Gagron, Jaisalmer, Kumbhalgarh, Ranthambore), a group of six forts built by various Rajput kingdoms and principalities during the medieval period are among the best examples of Rajput architecture. The ensemble is also a UNESCO World Heritage Site. Other forts include the Mehrangarh Fort and Jaigarh Fort.

Most of the population of Rajasthan is Hindu, and there has historically been a considerable Jain minority; this mixture is reflected in the many temples of the region. Māru-Gurjara architecture, or "Solaṅkī style" is a distinctive style that began in Rajasthan and Gujarat around the 11th century, and has been revived and taken to other parts of India and the world by both Hindus and Jains. This represents the main contribution of the region to Hindu temple architecture. The Dilwara Jain Temples of Mount Abu built between the 11th and 13th centuries CE are the best-known examples of the style. The Mughal architecture greatly influenced indigenous Rajput styles of art and architecture.

Some architectural style innovated and influenced by Rajasthani architectural styles are:

1. Ornated buildings or Havelis
2. Chhatris
3. Delicate ornamentation
4. Jharokha
5. Stepwell or Bawdi
Rajput Forts

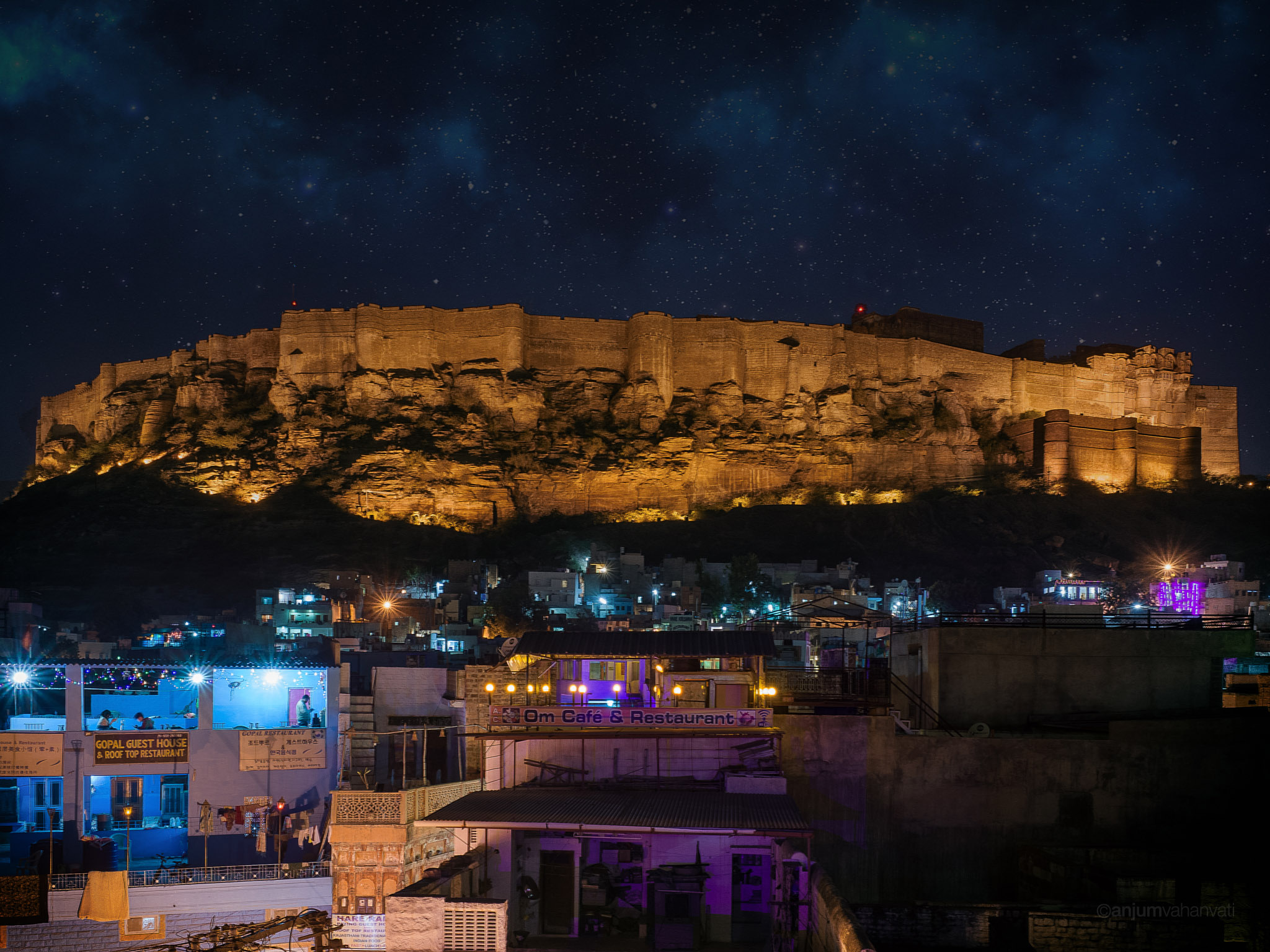
Jodhpur Fort

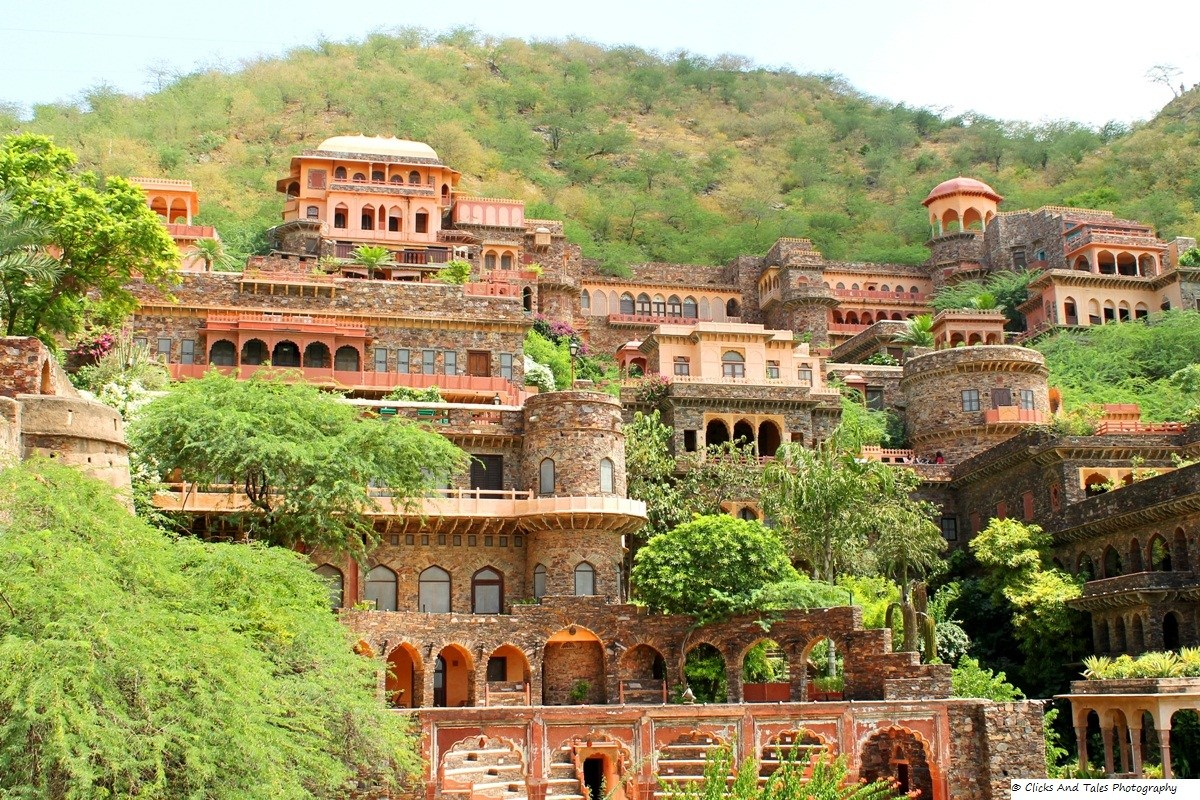
Neemrana Fort

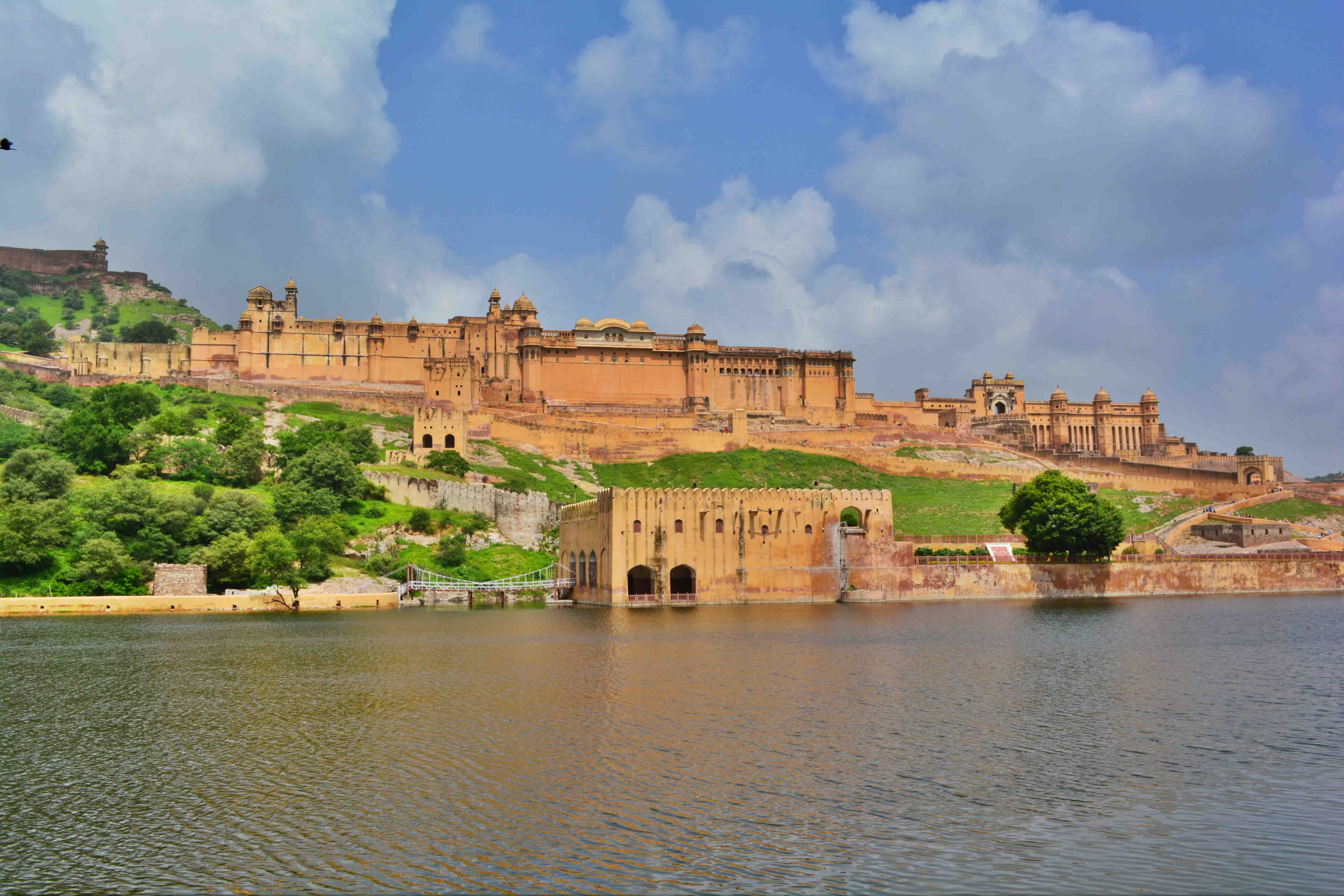
Amer Fort

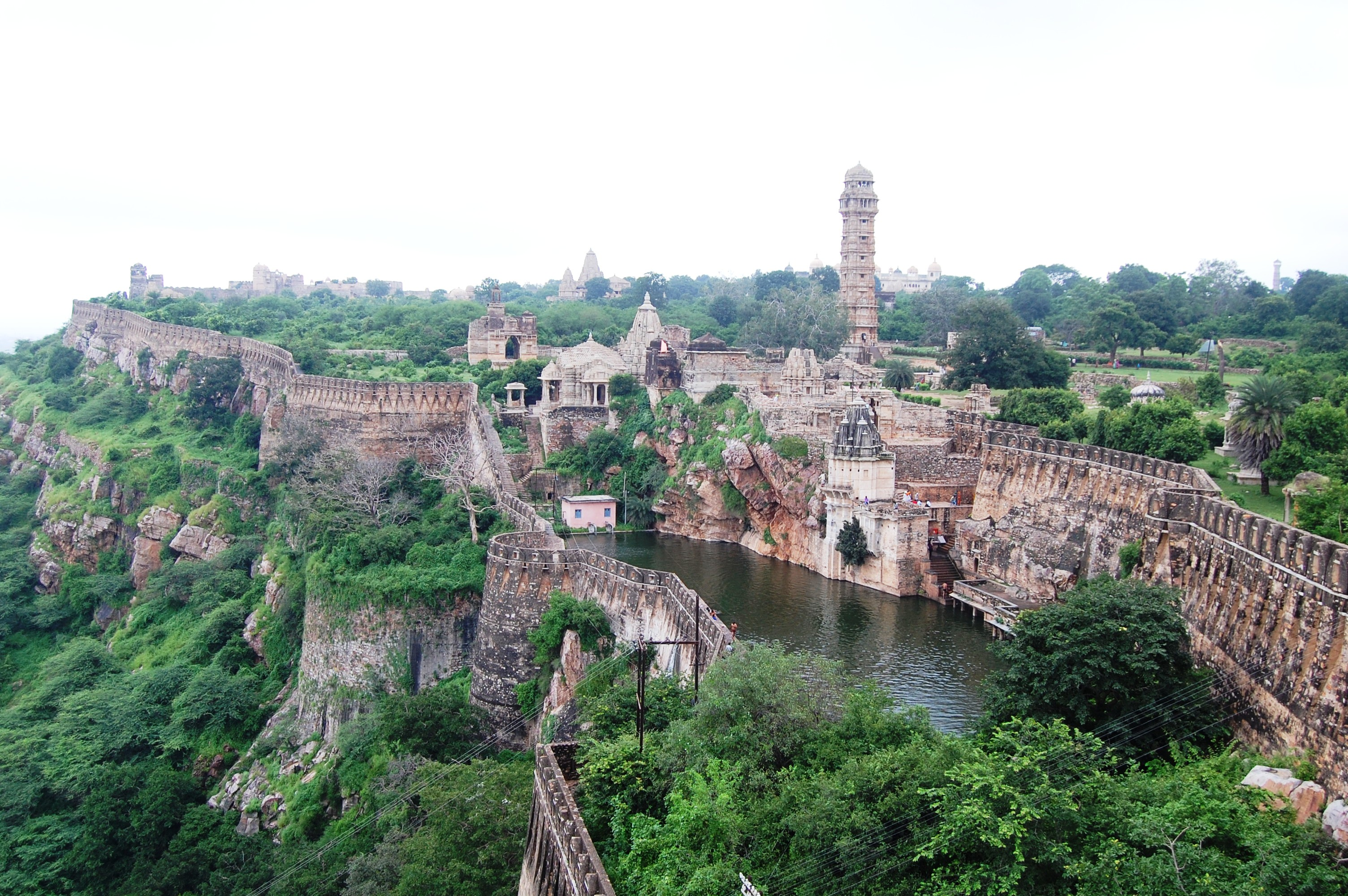
Chittorgarh Fort

In Hindi, the "Chhatri" refers to a canopy or umbrella. Chhatris are the elevated pavilions with dome shaped porches. The Chhatris are used as a symbol to portray the fundamentals of admiration and pride in its style of architecture.

A Jharokha is a kind of suspended enclosed gallery. A significant purpose it served was to allow women to witness the events and society outside the palace life without being noticed. This eventually lead to Jharokha Darshan, adapted by the Mughals, which allowed essential and direct communication between the emperors or kings and the general public.

The walled city of Jaipur was formed in 1727 by Kacchwaha Rajput ruler Jai Singh II, and is "a unique example of traditional Hindu town planning", following the precepts set out in much Hindu texts. Subsequently, the City Palace, Hawa Mahal, Rambagh Palace, Jal Mahal and Albert Hall Museum were also built. Udaipur also has several palaces, including the Bagore-ki-Haveli, now a museum, built in the 18th century.

Rajput architecture continued well into the 20th and 21st centuries, as the rulers of the princely states of British India commissioned vast palaces and other buildings, such as the Albert Hall Museum, Lalgarh Palace, and Umaid Bhawan Palace. These usually incorporated European styles as well, a practice which eventually led to the Indo-Saracenic style

=== Maratha Architecture ===
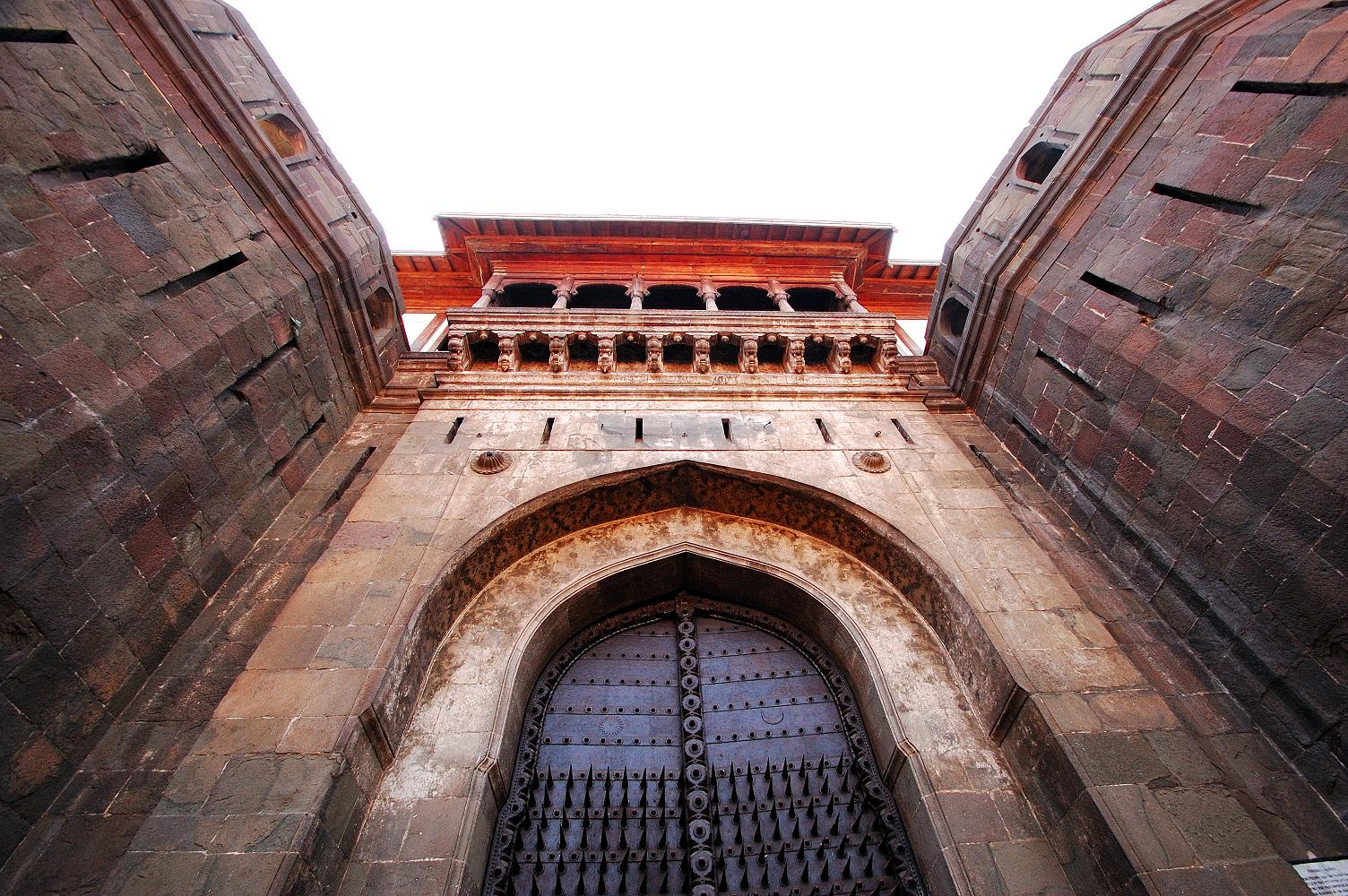
Shaniwarwada palace fort in Pune

The Maratha Empire developed a distinctive architectural style, particularly in present-day Maharashtra and parts of central India. Notable examples include Shaniwar Wada and Lal Mahal in Pune. The decorative features of the mansions were “pointed arches, heavy carved stone brackets, narrow balconies projecting on rows of such brackets, domical shallow ceilings resting on a variety of squinches, the chief being the interwoven type”.

Many jyotirlinga temples were rebuilt by the Marathas after being damaged or destroyed by invading Islamic forces. Some examples are the Kashi Vishwanath, Mahakaleshwar, Trimbakeshwar, Grishneshwar temples. The ghats of Varanasi were also rebuilt under Maratha patronage, including the Dashashwamedh Ghat and Scindia Ghat.

The Maratha structures used both the local architectural style and the Maratha's own distinct corinthian columns style. Because of the constant turmoil and protracted wars with Mughals, Nawabs, Afghans, and other forces, very little documentation of these efforts remain. Nevertheless, studies of these structures show that the main architectural elements were made from brick, wood, mortar and stone. Wood was most used element as it is easily and cheaply available in Maharashtra and Karnataka. The historian Khafi Khan praised the beauty of wooden palaces, temples, and forts in the Deccan. However, very few of these survived due to wars with Mughal Empire and the comparatively short life of wooden structures than stone and marble structures. Forts were the main focus of Maratha architecture, decorated with Deccan-style pointed arches and elaborate woodwork.

Herman Goetz writes about their architectural style in his work ‘Five Thousand Years of Indian Art’: “The Maratha temples generally provided with a huge lampstand (deepmala), The wood work they used to decorate their palaces and other civil buildings was intricate and minute. Maratha art could have developed and attained a distinctive character but it was not possible because of the turbulent times of medieval India.

=== Dzong Architecture ===
Dzongs are a type of fortified monastery with a distinctive architecture that are found mainly in Tibet, Bhutan and North India. The architecture is massive in style with towering exterior walls surrounding a complex of courtyards, temples, administrative offices, and monks' accommodation.

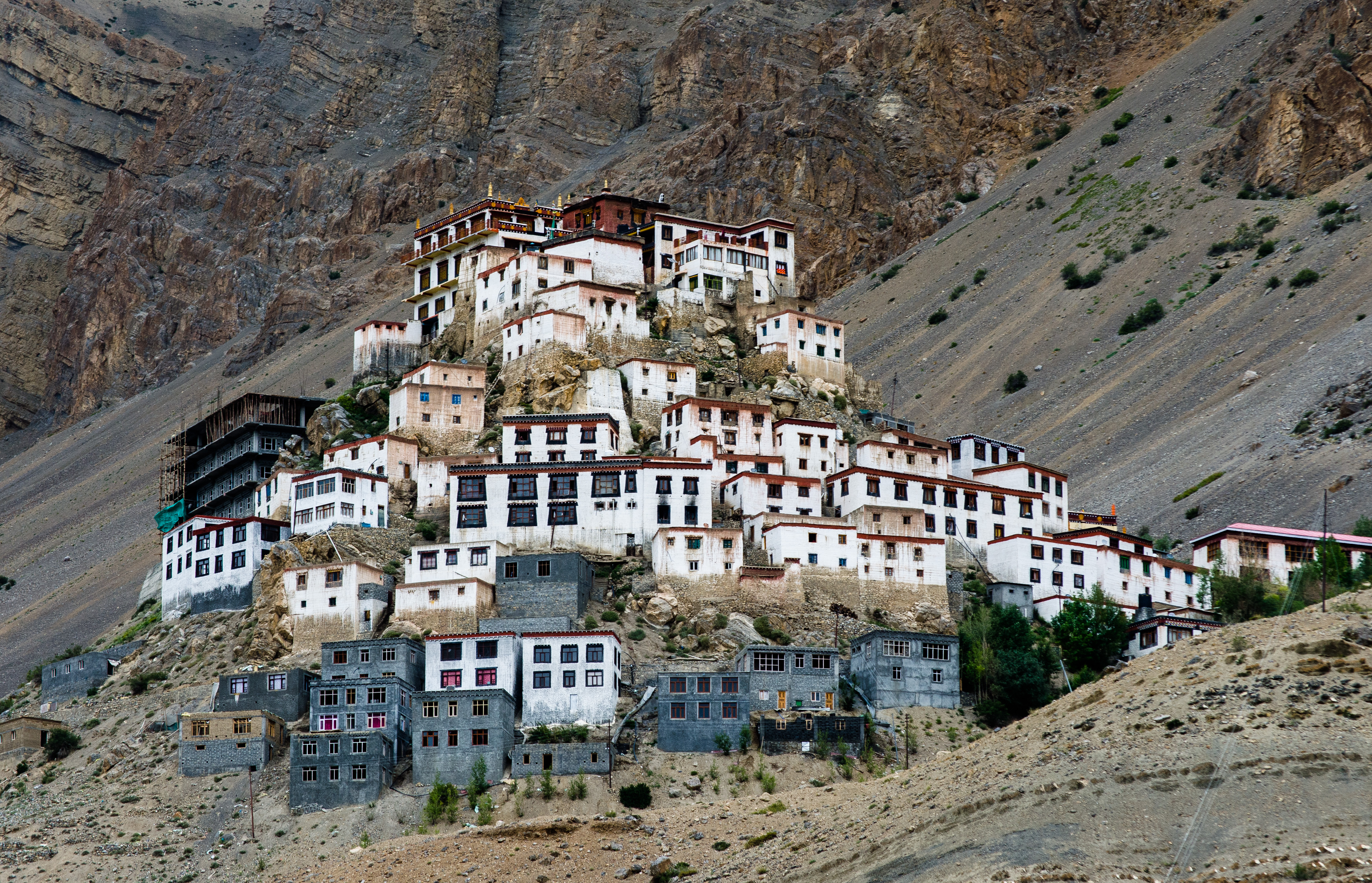
Kee monastery, Spiti

Distinctive features include:

- High inward sloping walls of brick and stone painted white with few or no windows in the lower sections of the wall
- Use of a surrounding red ochre stripe near the top of the walls, sometimes punctuated by large gold circles
- Use of unique style flared roofs atop interior temples
- Massive entry doors made of wood and iron
- Interior courtyards and temples brightly colored in Buddhist-themed art motifs such as the ashtamangala or swastika

By tradition, dzongs are constructed without the use of architectural plans. Instead construction proceeds under the direction of a high lama who establishes each dimension by means of spiritual inspiration. Dzongs comprise heavy masonry walls surrounding one or more courtyards. The main functional spaces are usually arranged in two separate areas: the administrative offices; and the religious functions – including temples and monks' accommodation. This division between administrative and religious functions reflects the idealized duality of power between the religious and administrative branches of government.

This accommodation is arranged along the inside of the outer walls and often as a separate stone tower located centrally within the courtyard, housing the main temple, that can be used as an inner defensible citadel. The roofs are massively constructed in hardwood and bamboo, highly decorated at the eaves, and are constructed traditionally without the use of nails. They are open at the eaves to provide a ventilated storage area. They were traditionally finished with timber shingles weighted down with stones

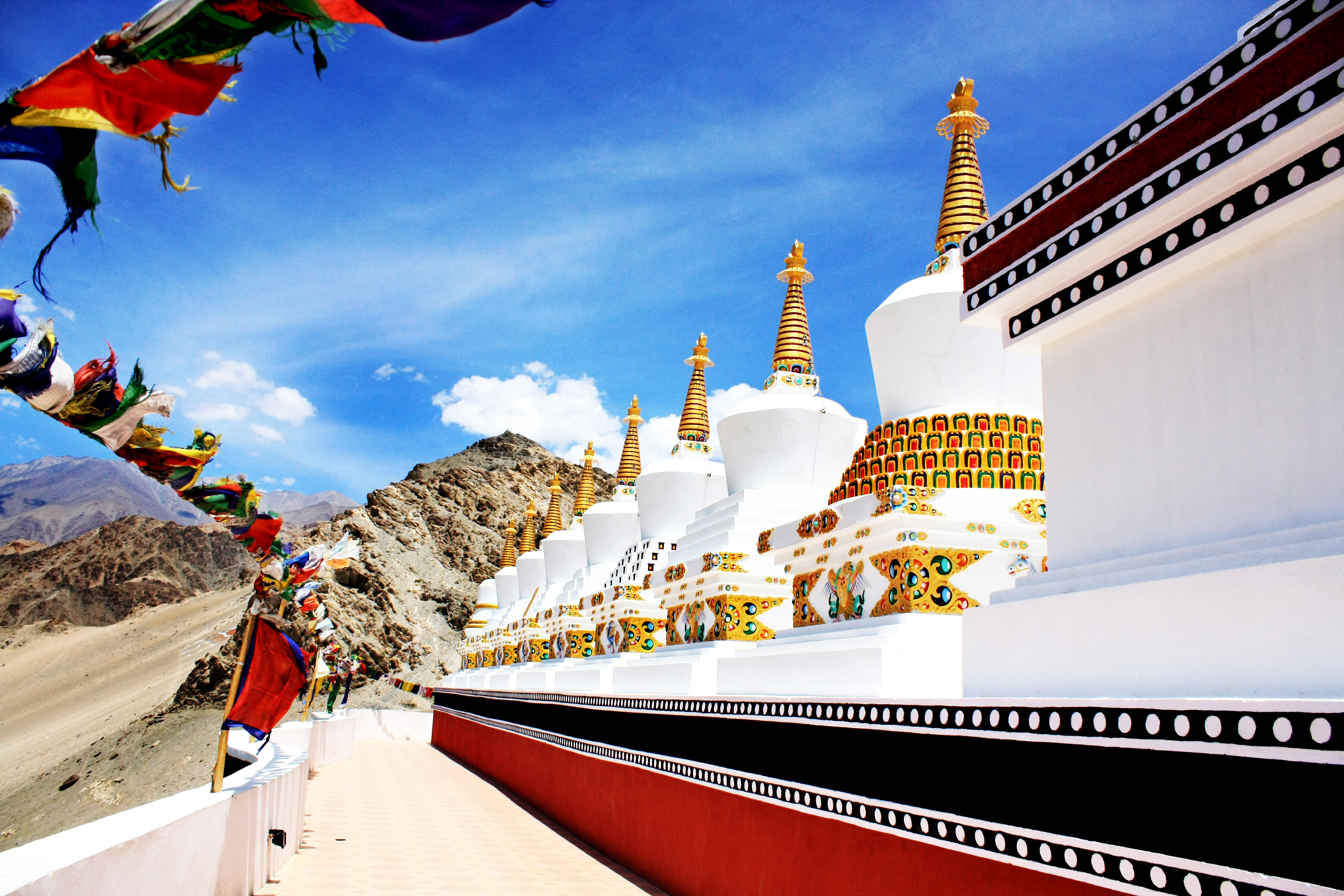
Stupas in Thikse Monastery

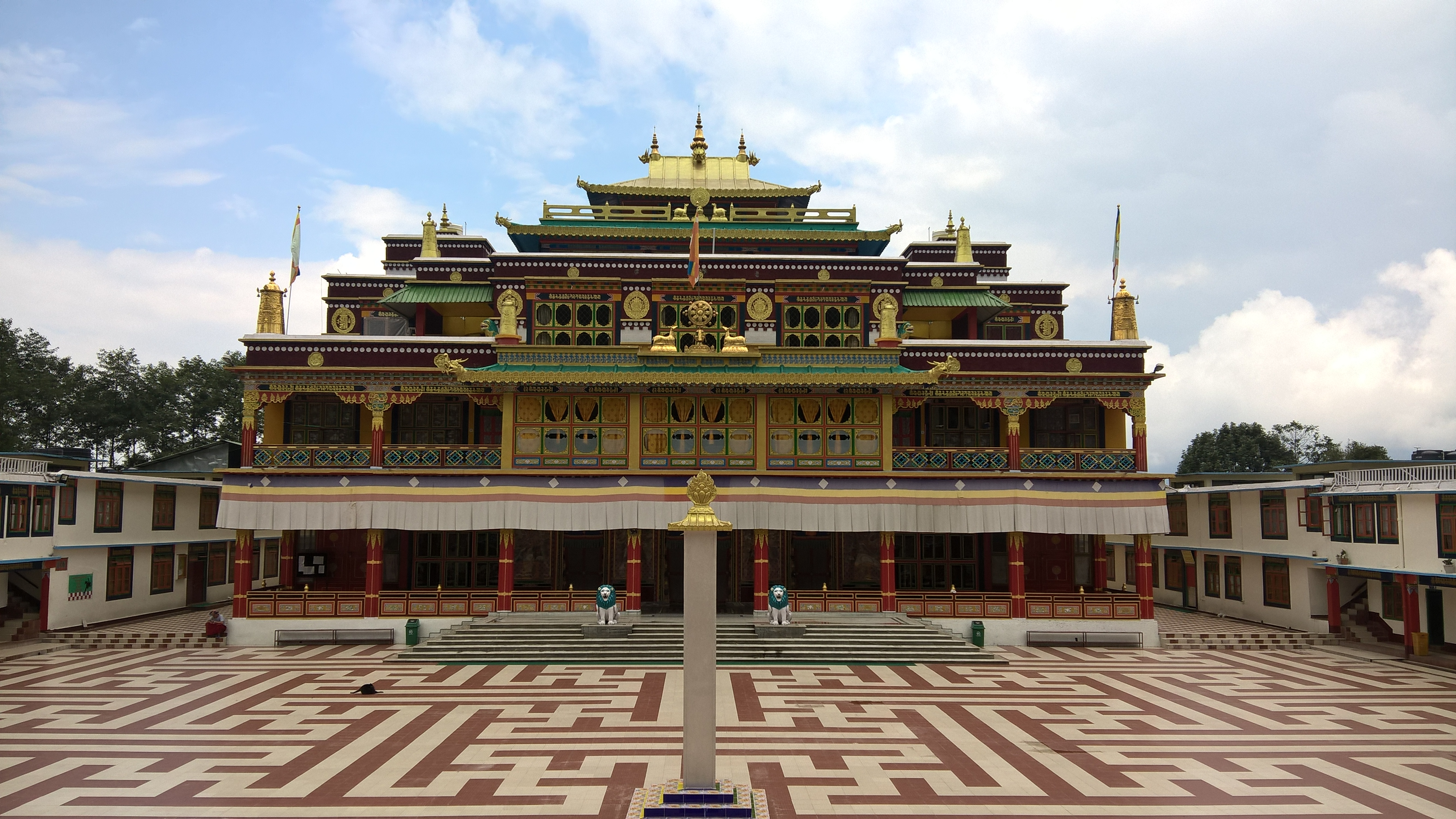
Ralang Monastery, Sikkim

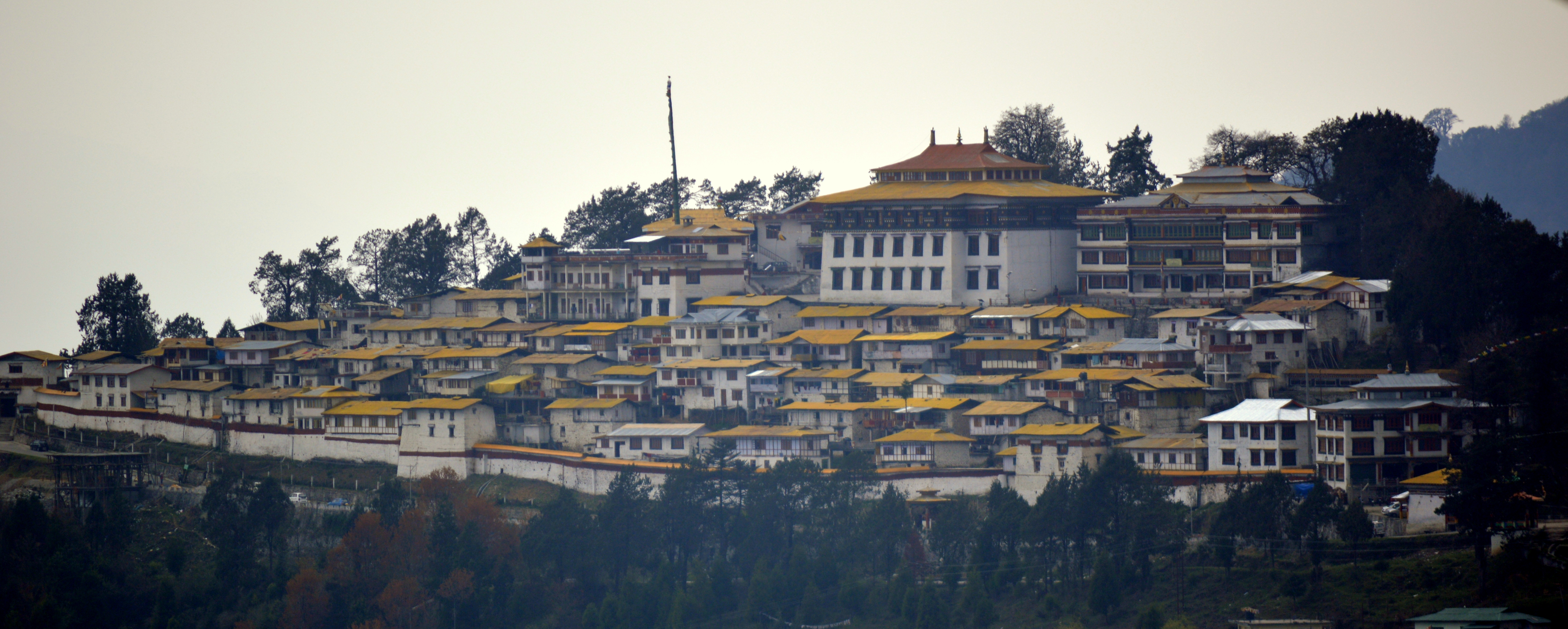
Tawang Monastery, Arunachal Pradesh

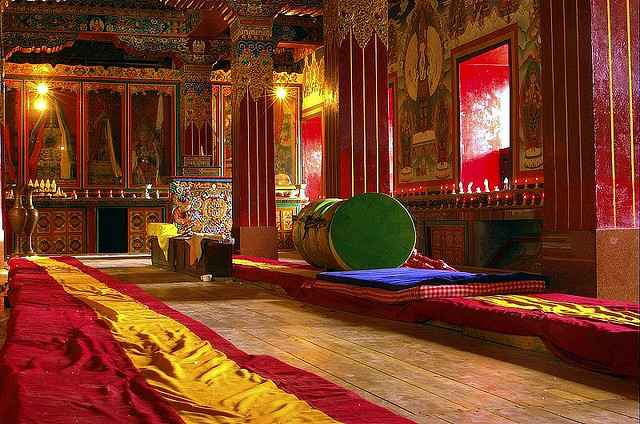
Tawang Monastery assembly hall

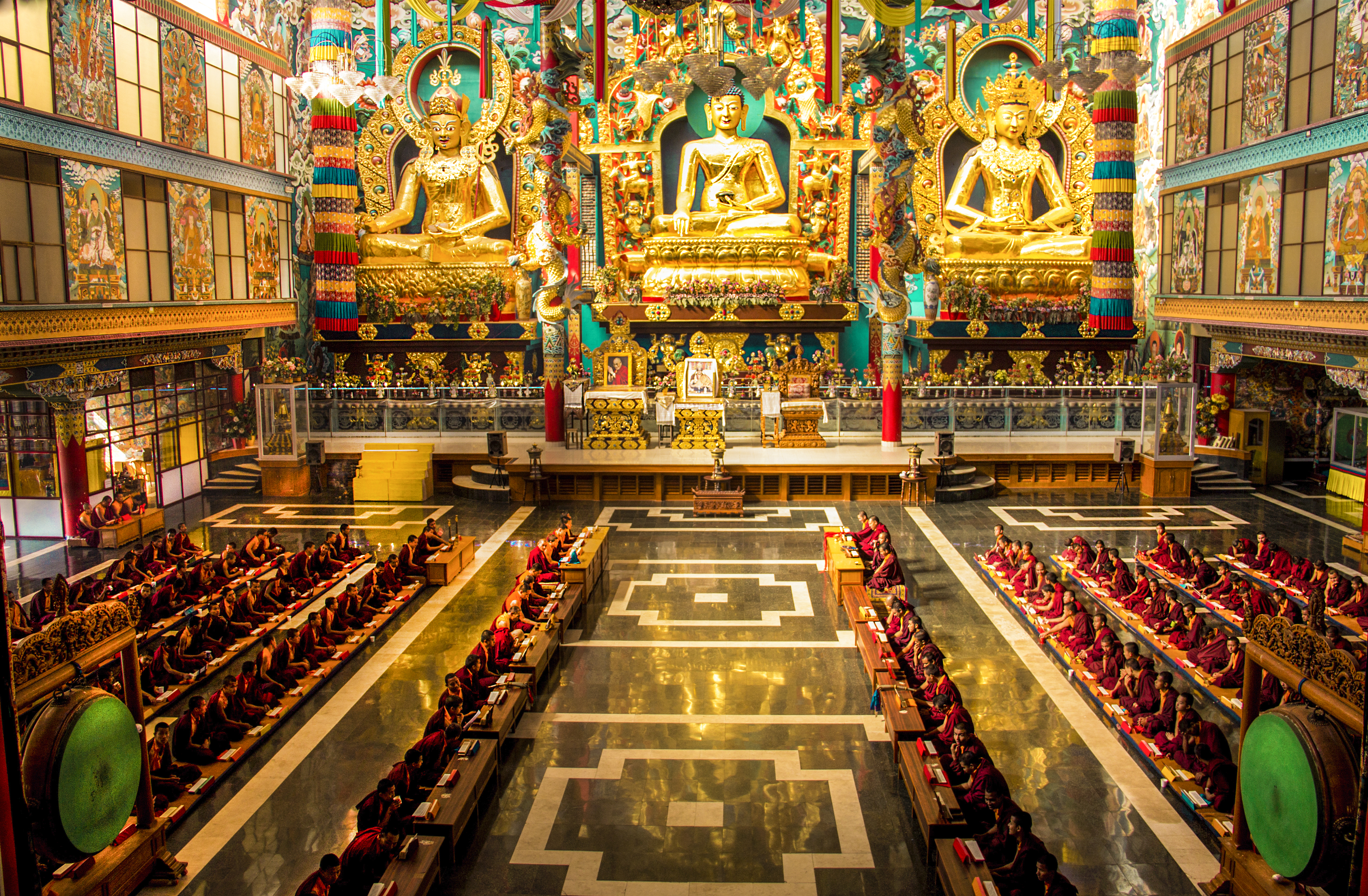
Prayer hall at the Golden Temple in Bylakuppe, a Tibetan settlement in Karnataka

=== Bengal Architecture ===
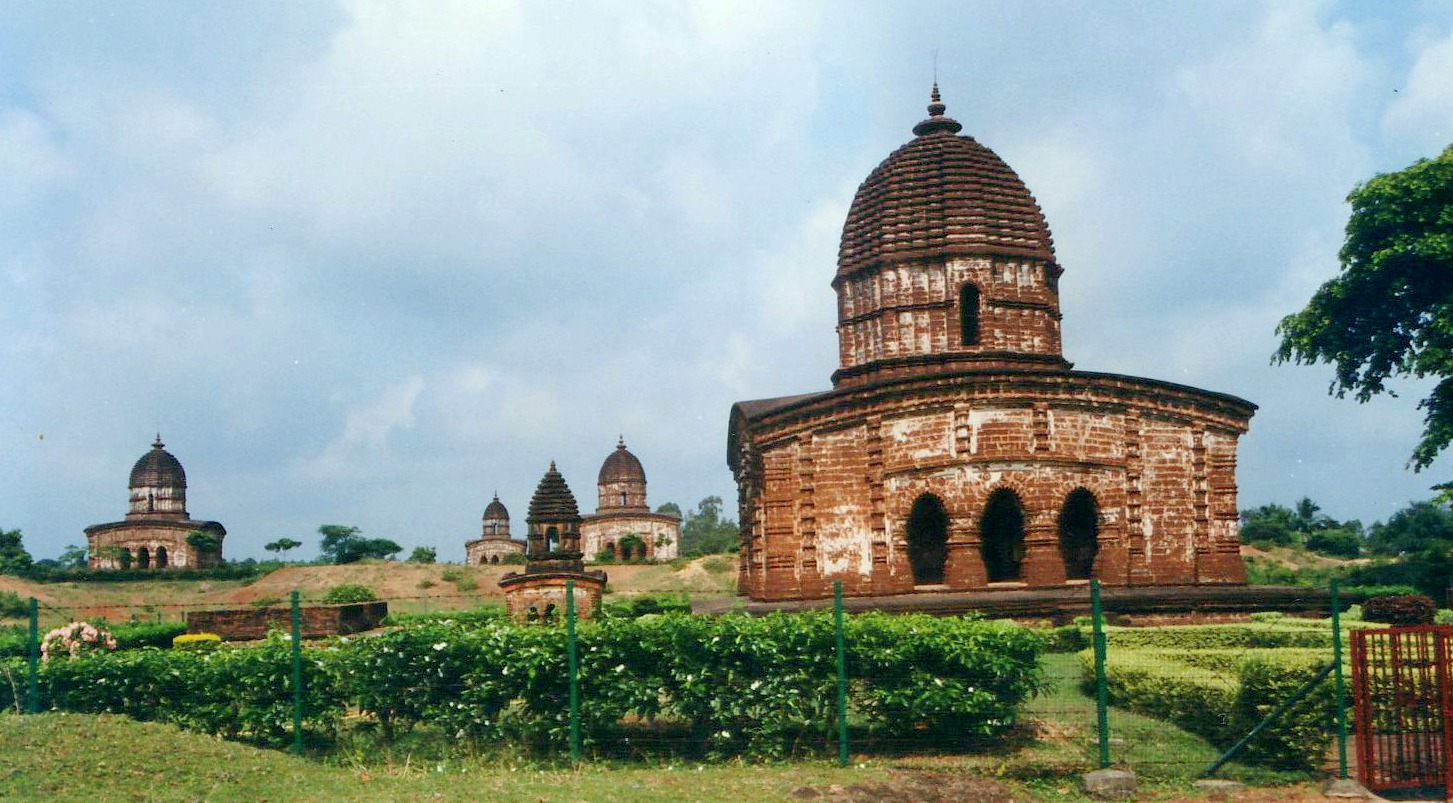
Cluster of temples in Bishnupur

The architecture of Bengal, which comprises the modern country of Bangladesh and the Indian states of West Bengal, Tripura, and Barak Valley in Assam, has a long and rich history, blending indigenous elements from the Indian subcontinent, with influences from different parts of the world. Bengali architecture includes ancient urban architecture, religious architecture, rural vernacular architecture, colonial townhouses and country houses, and modern urban styles.

Ancient Bengali architecture reached its pinnacle during the Pala Empire (750–1161); this was Bengali-based and the last Buddhist imperial power in the Indian subcontinent. Most patronage was of Buddhist viharas, temples and stupas. Pala architecture influenced Tibetan and Southeast Asian architecture. The most famous monument built by the Pala emperors was the Somapura Mahavihara, now a UNESCO World Heritage Site. Historians believe Somapura was a model for the architects of Angkor Wat in Cambodia.

Distinctive architectural elements are:-

- Deul Temple - Originally influenced by Kalinga style, they were main temple style during 6th-10th century. It was the style of Jain and Hindu temple architecture of Bengal, where the temple lacks the usual mandapa beside the main shrine, and the main unit consists only of the shrine and a deul (shikhara) above it. It was revived in the 16th to 19th century. The later representatives of this style were generally smaller and included features influenced by Islamic architecture.
- Chala Temple - Chala style or Hut style temples were influenced by the vernacular architecture or rural Bengal. Thatched rooftops of the houses were either in form of do-chala type which has only two hanging roof tips on each side of a roof divided in the middle by a ridge or char-chala type, the two roof halves are fused into one unit and have a dome-like shape. The char-chala temples started coming up around the 17th century and profoundly adopted by Mughal and later the Rajput in their architectural styles.
- Ratna Temple - The curved roof of the temple is surmounted by one or more towers or pinnacles called ratna (jewel). The ratna style came up in the 15th-16th century. It was basically a mix of chala and deul architecture where small deul, or in some case domes, were used on the centre or corners of the chala (char chala) roof.
- Dalan Temple - With the comings of European colonists, a new form of temple style took place. Generally used by Zamindars or elite Bengalis, Dalan style became prominent in the 19th century. The flat-roofed (dalan) temples was easier to build and had incorporated many European elements, specially the arches. In the long run, this style lost its special identity as religious architecture and got mixed up with domestic architecture.
Distinct Bengali Temple Style

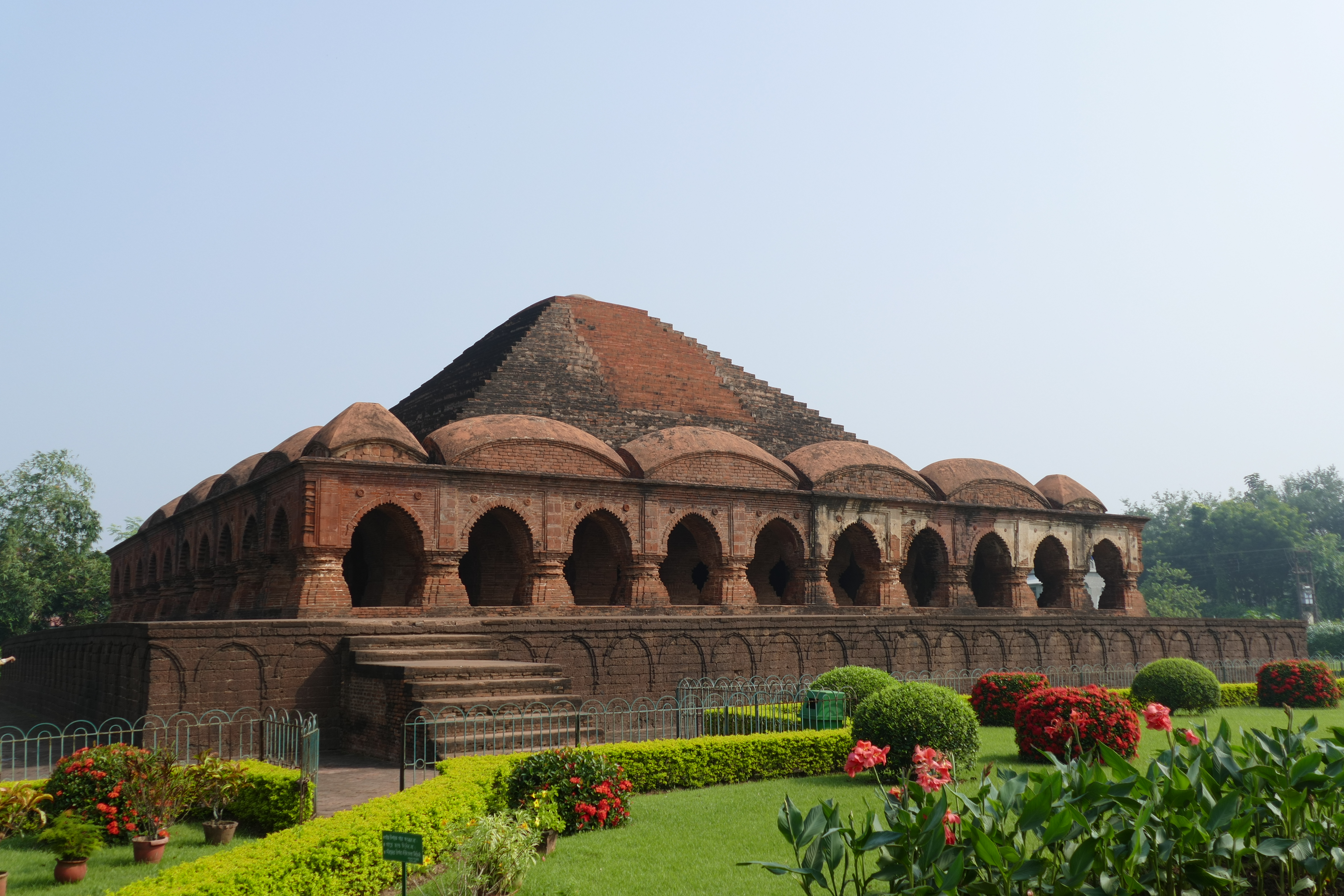
Pyramidal shaped structure over Rasmancha

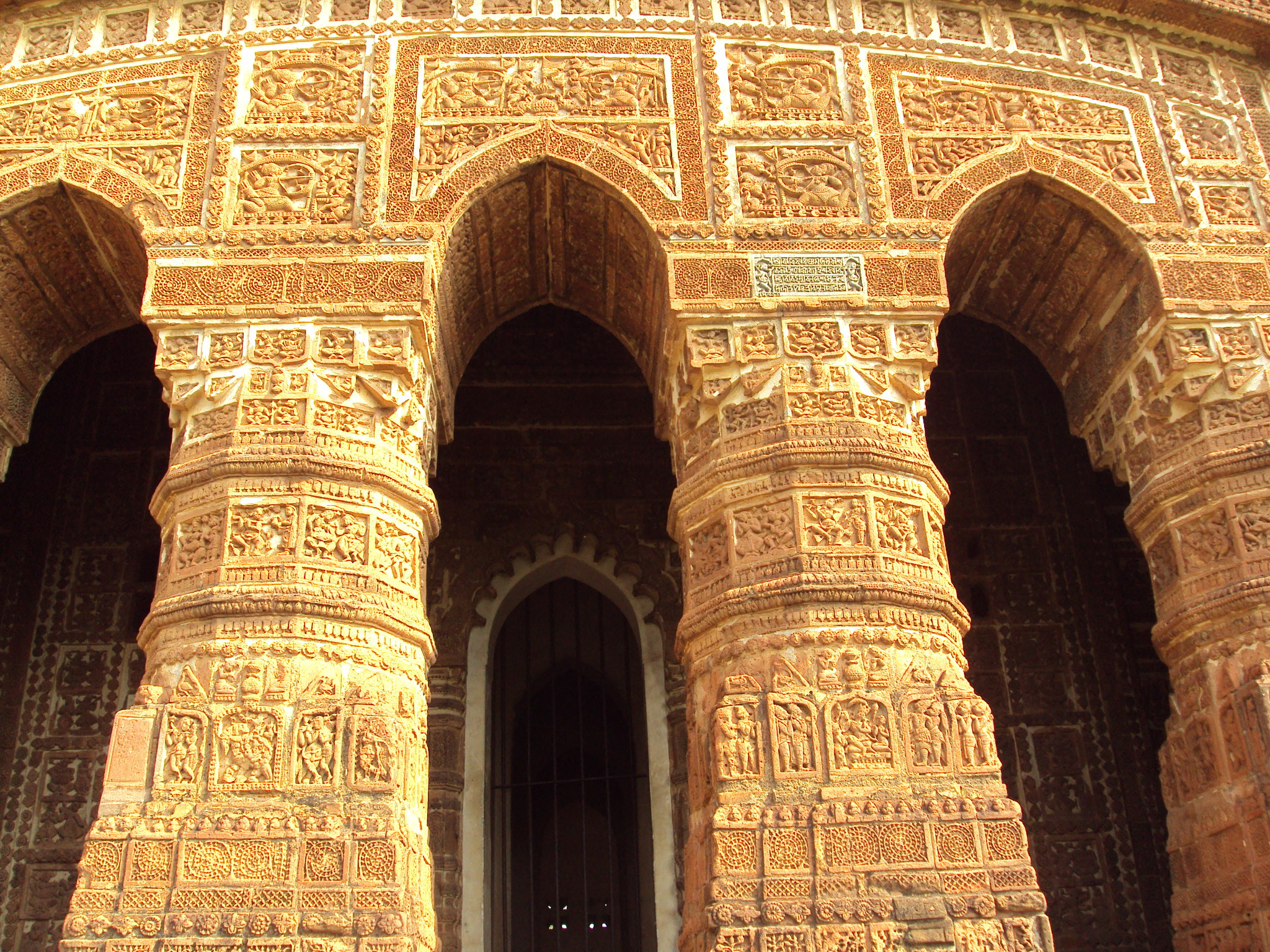
Terracota work at a temple of Jor Bangla

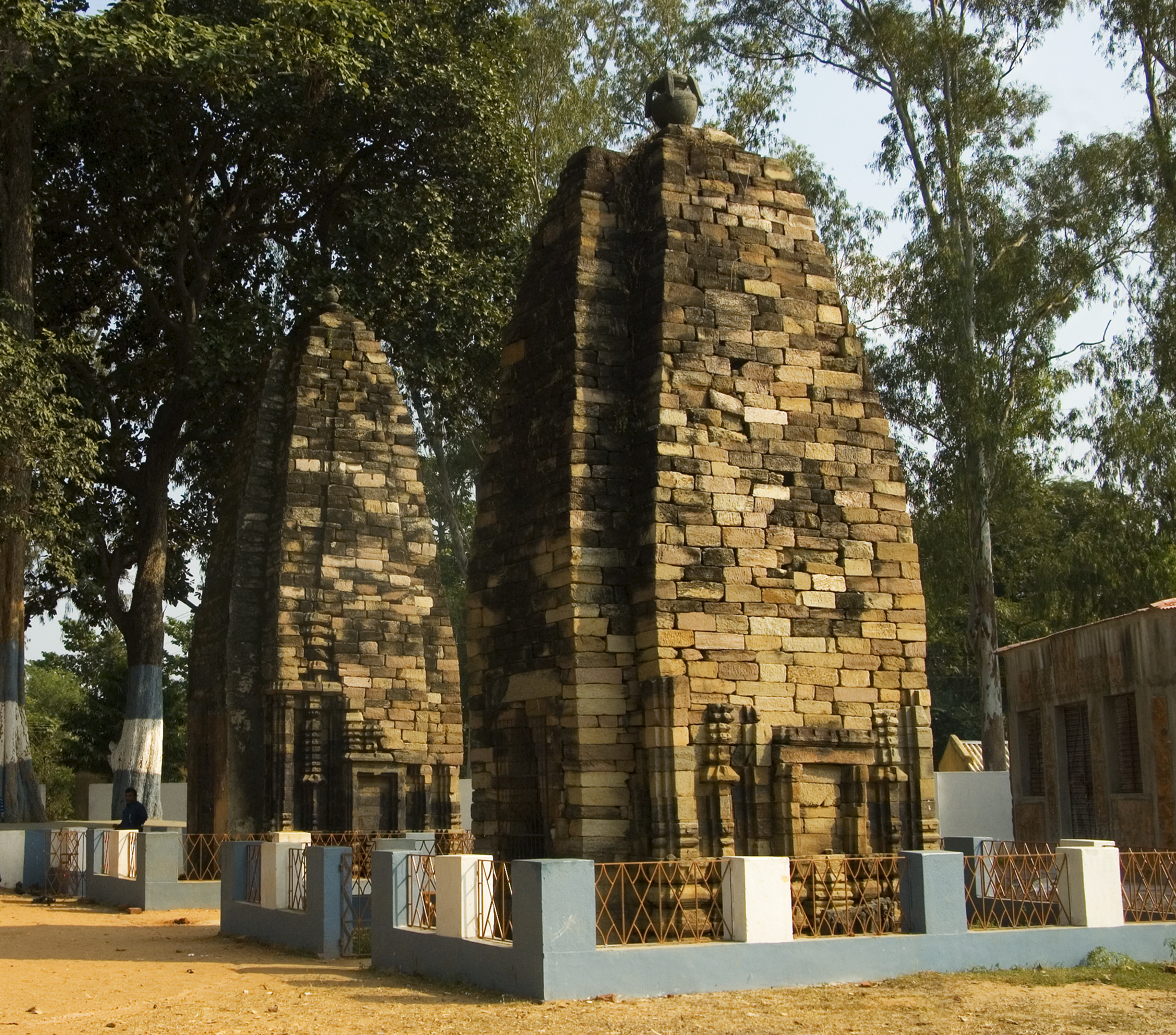
Pakbirra Jain Shrine, Deul Temple

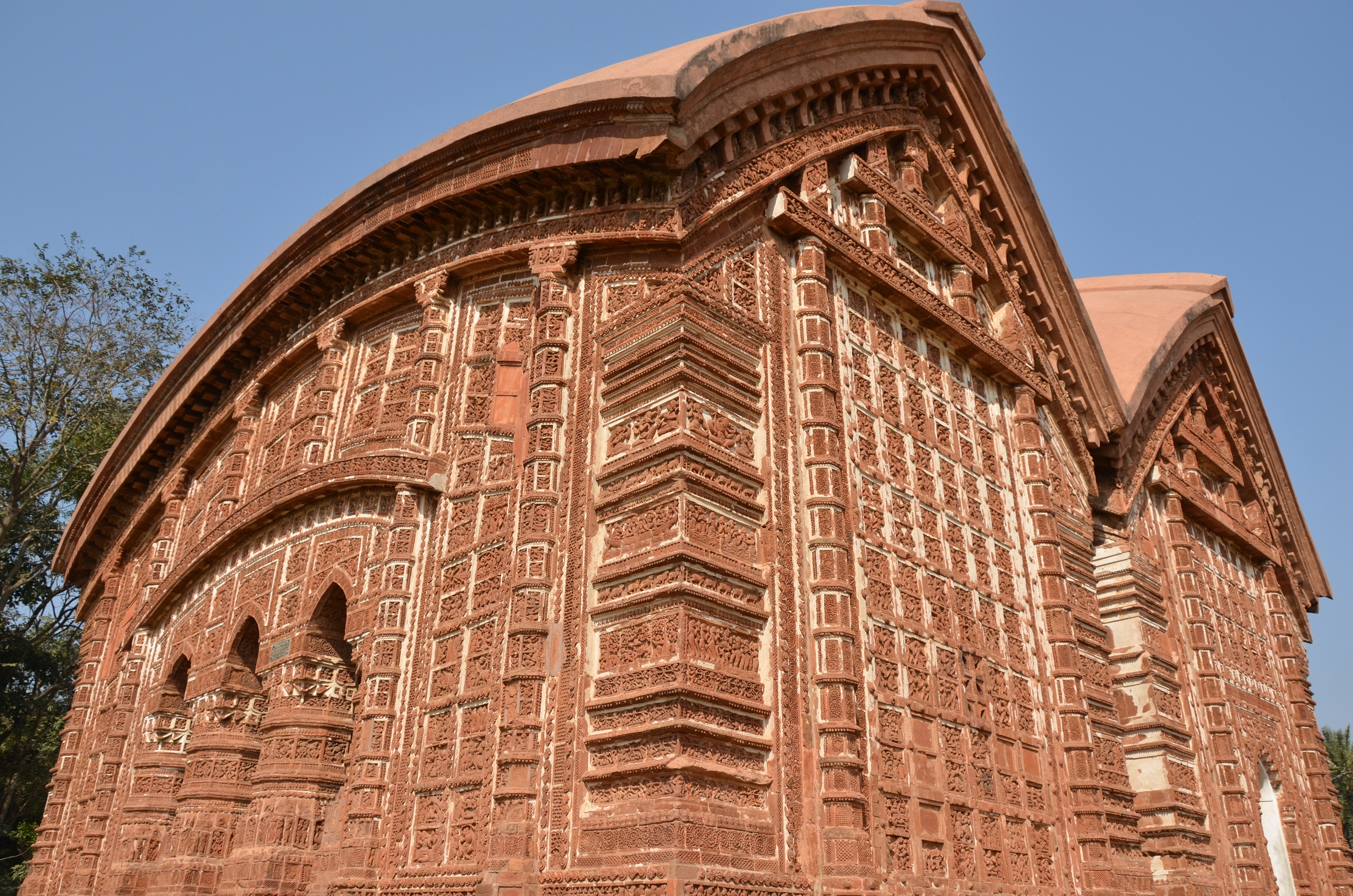
Jorbangla (Douchala style) Temple

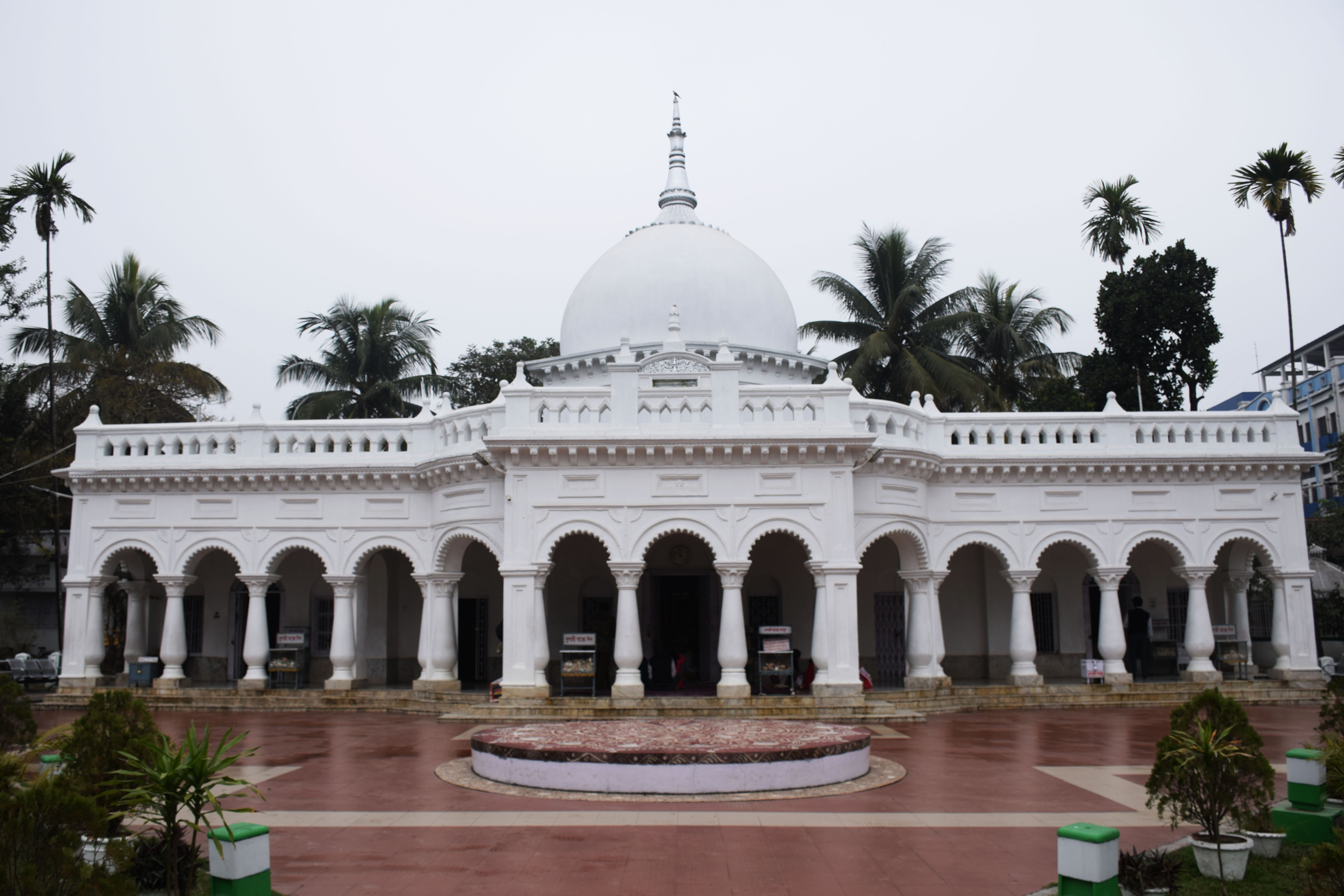
Flat roofed dalan with dome, Madan Mohan Temple

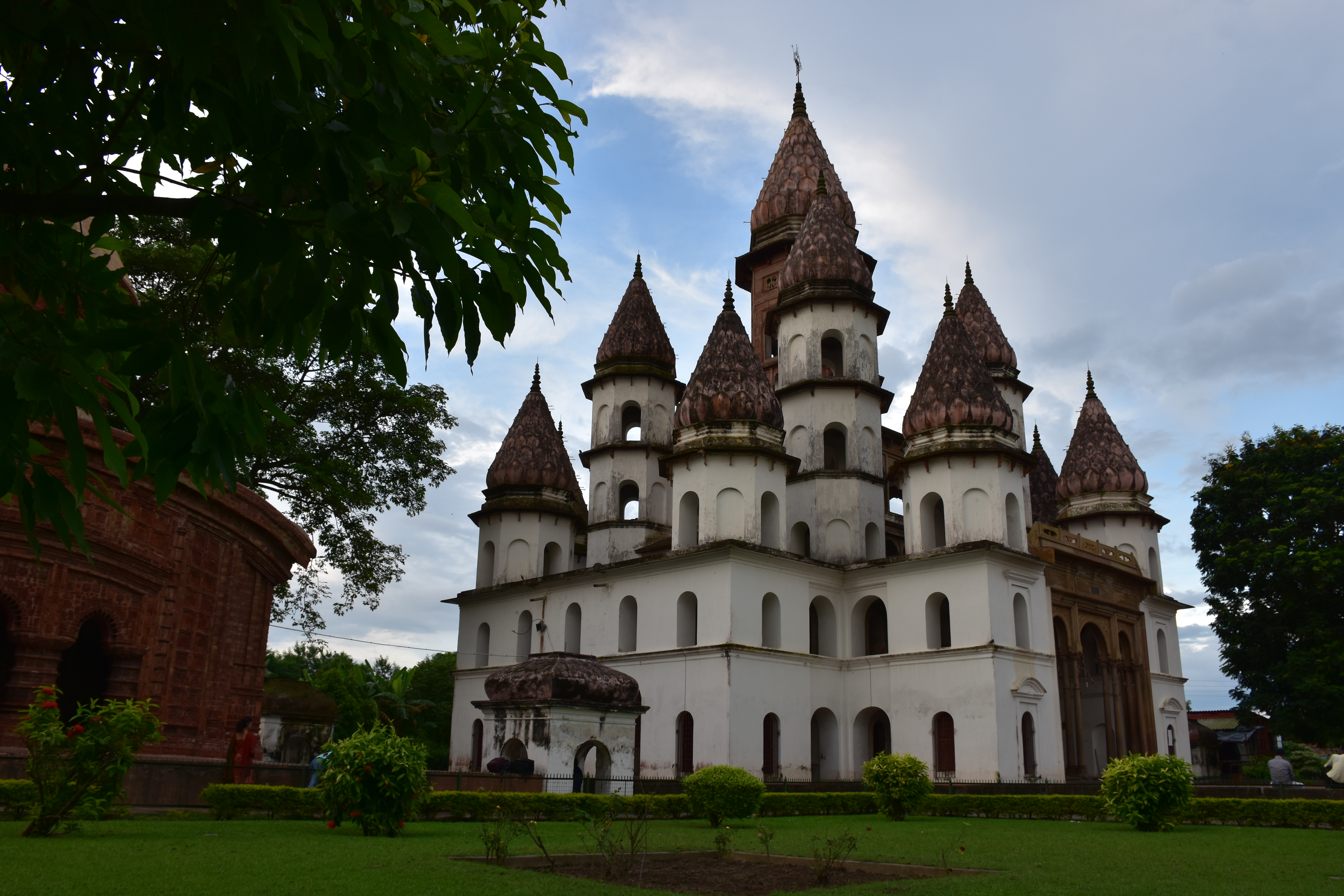
Hangseshwari Temple, Ratna Temple

Deuls are located in the numerous rivers crisscrossed by stone-free alluvial and bush landscape of the southern Sundarbans settlements in the Indian state of West Bengal.

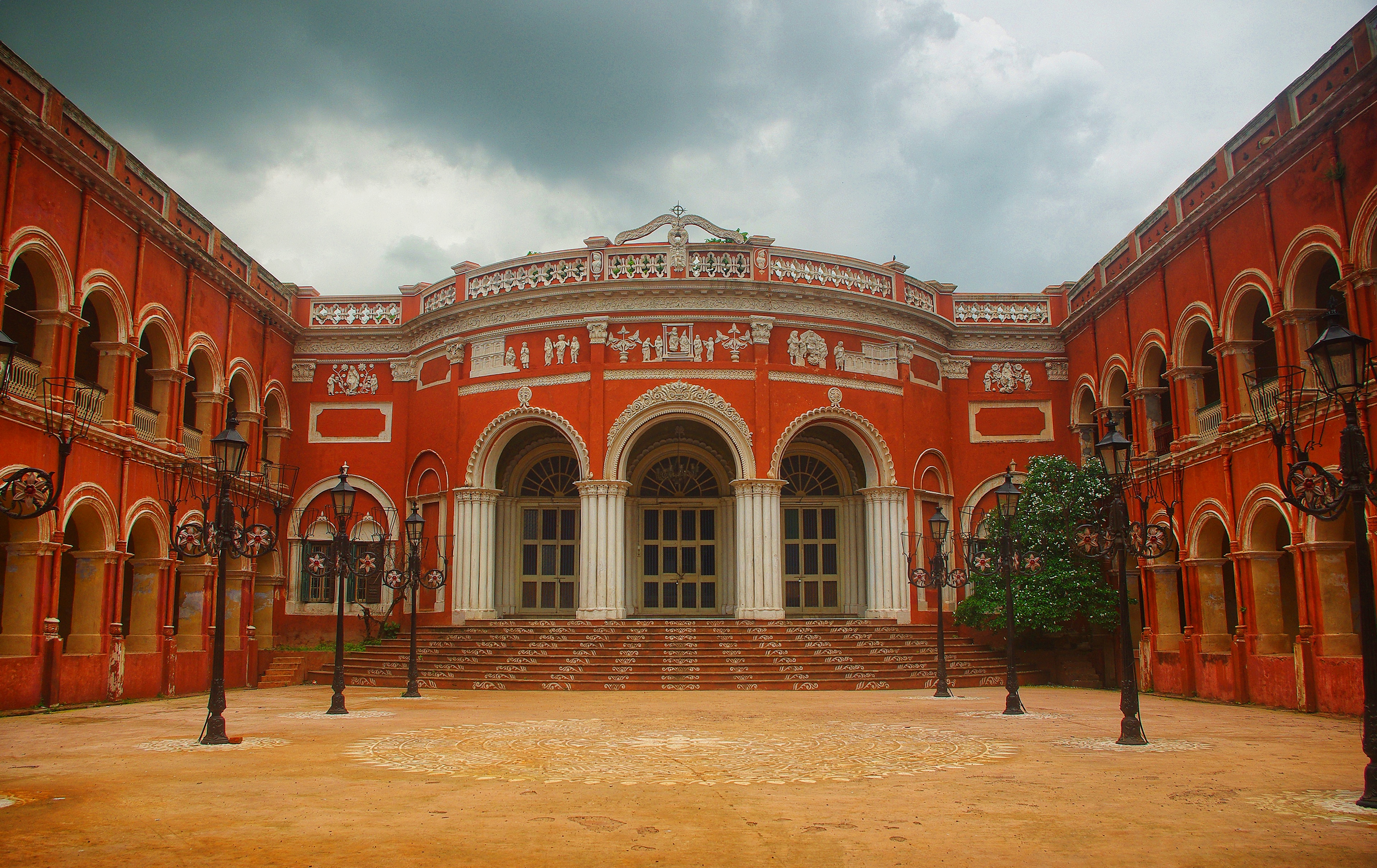
Thakur Dalan of Itachuna Rajbari at Khanyan

Most temples surviving in reasonable condition date from about the 17th century onwards, after temple building revived; it had stopped after the Muslim conquest in the 13th century. The roofing style of Bengali Hindu temple architecture is unique and closely related to the paddy roofed traditional building style of rural Bengal. The "extensive improvisation within a local architectural idiom" which the temples exhibit is often ascribed to a local shortage of expert Brahmin priests to provide the rather rigid guidance as to correct forms that governed temple architecture elsewhere. In the same way the terracotta reliefs often depict secular subjects in a very lively fashion.

In larger, and later, temples, small towers rise up from the centre or corners of the curving roof. These are straight-sided, often with conical roofs. They have little resemblance to a typical north Indian shikara temple tower. The pancharatna ("five towers") and navaratna ("nine towers") styles are varieties of this type.

The bungalow style is a notable architectural export of Bengal. The corner towers of Bengali religious buildings were replicated in medieval Southeast Asia. Bengali curved roofs, suitable for the very heavy rains, were adopted into a distinct local style of Indo-Islamic architecture, and used decoratively elsewhere in north India in Mughal architecture.

Structures like Rasmancha, built by King Bir Hambir, has an unusual elongated pyramidical tower, surrounded by hut-shaped turrets, which were very typical of Bengali roof structures of the time. Madan Mohan Temple was built in the ekaratna style, surmounted by a pinnacle along with carvings on the walls depicting scenes from the Ramayana, Mahabharata and the Puranas. Temples like Dakshineswar Kali Temple, features the Navratna style of roof.

Bengal is not rich in good stone for building, and traditional Bengali architecture mostly uses brick and wood, often reflecting the styles of the wood, bamboo and thatch styles of local vernacular architecture for houses. Decorative carved or moulded plaques of terracotta (the same material as the brick) are a special feature. The brick is extremely durable and disused ancient buildings were often used as a convenient source of materials by local people, often being stripped to their foundations over the centuries.

== European colonial architecture ==
As with the Mughals, under European colonial rule, architecture became an emblem of power, designed to endorse the occupying power. Numerous European countries invaded the Indian subcontinent and created architectural styles reflective of their ancestral and adopted homes. The European colonizers created architecture that symbolized their mission of conquest, dedicated to the state or religion.

The British, French, Dutch, and the Portuguese were the main European powers that established colonies in India.

=== British Colonial Era: 1757–1947 ===
==== Indo-Saracenic ====
Lutyens' Delhi

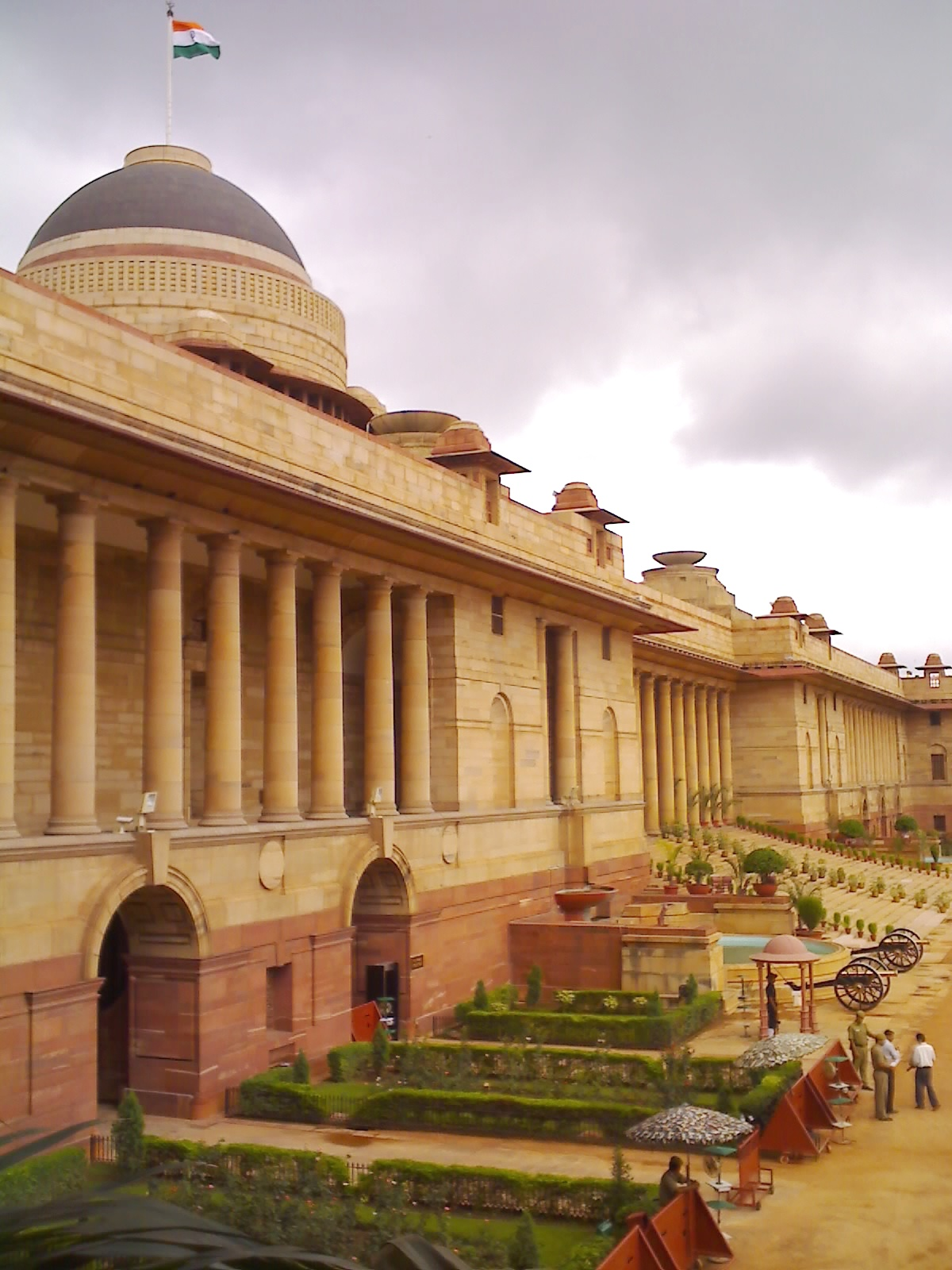
The Viceroy's House (now Rashtrapati Bhavan) was built for the Viceroy of India. It now serves as the official residence of the President of India.

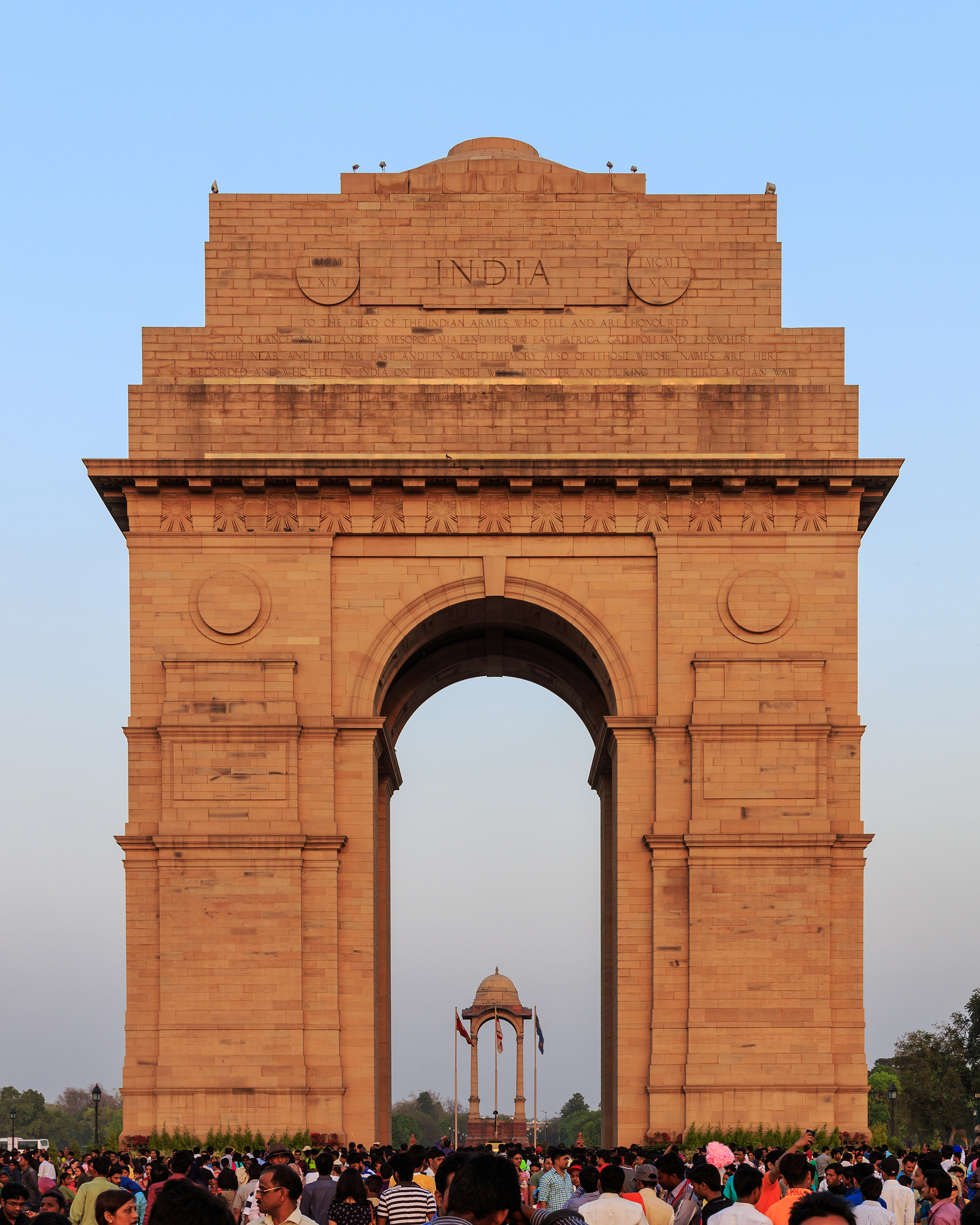
The War Memorial Arch (now India Gate) is a memorial to 70,000 soldiers of the British Indian Army who died in the First World War.

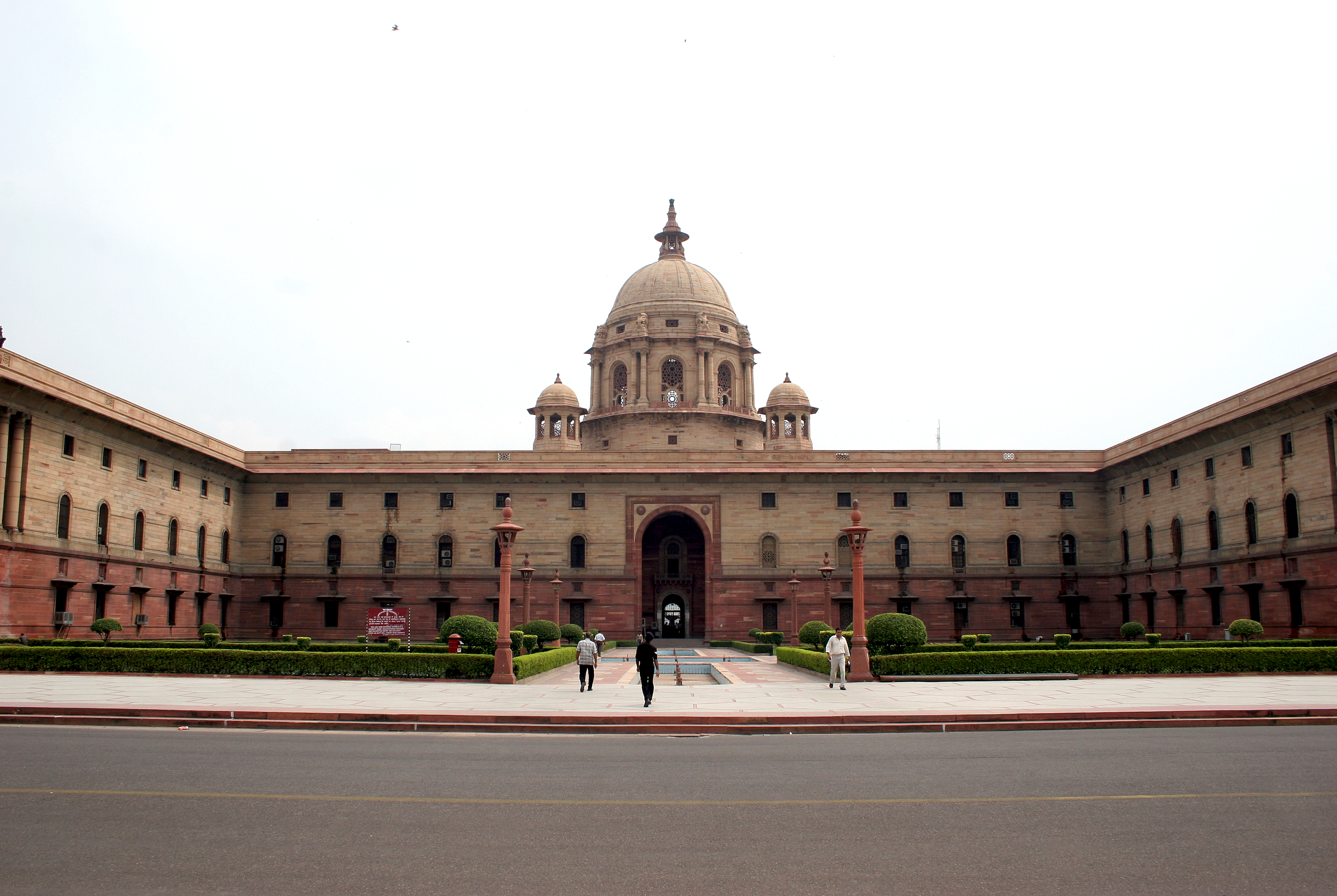
The Secretariat Building is located in the North Block.

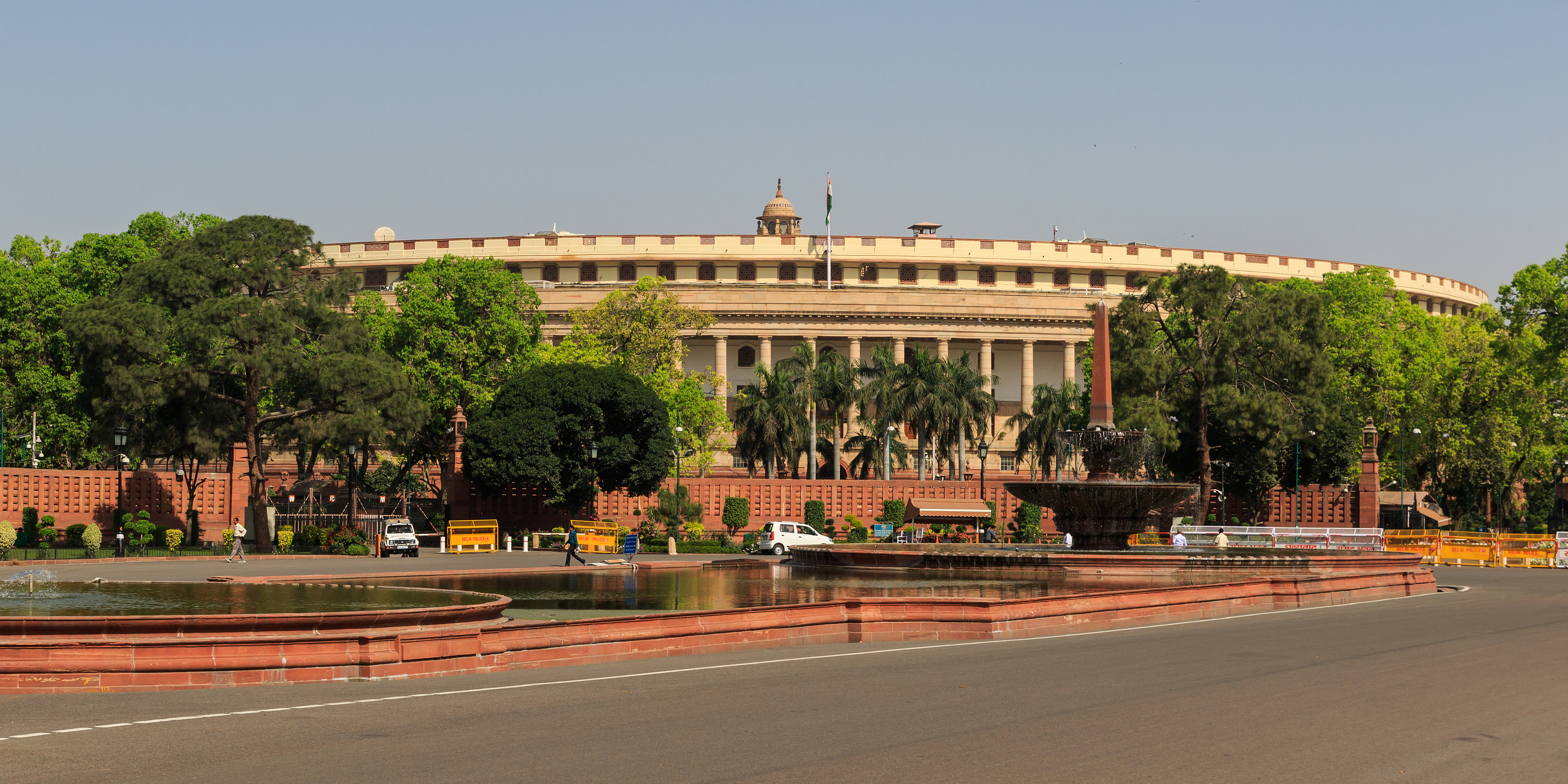
The Council House, built for the Imperial Legislative Council, is now Sansad Bhawan, and houses the Parliament of India.

Lutyens' Delhi, designed by Edwin Lutyens, houses all key government buildings of India.

Britain's legacy and heritage in the Indian subcontinent remains among others in buildings and infrastructure. The major cities during the period of British rule were Madras (Chennai), Calcutta, Bombay (Mumbai), New Delhi, Agra, Bangalore, Bankipore, Karachi, Nagpur, Bhopal, and Hyderabad, which saw the rise of Indo-Saracenic Revival architecture.

Indo-Saracenic Revival architecture

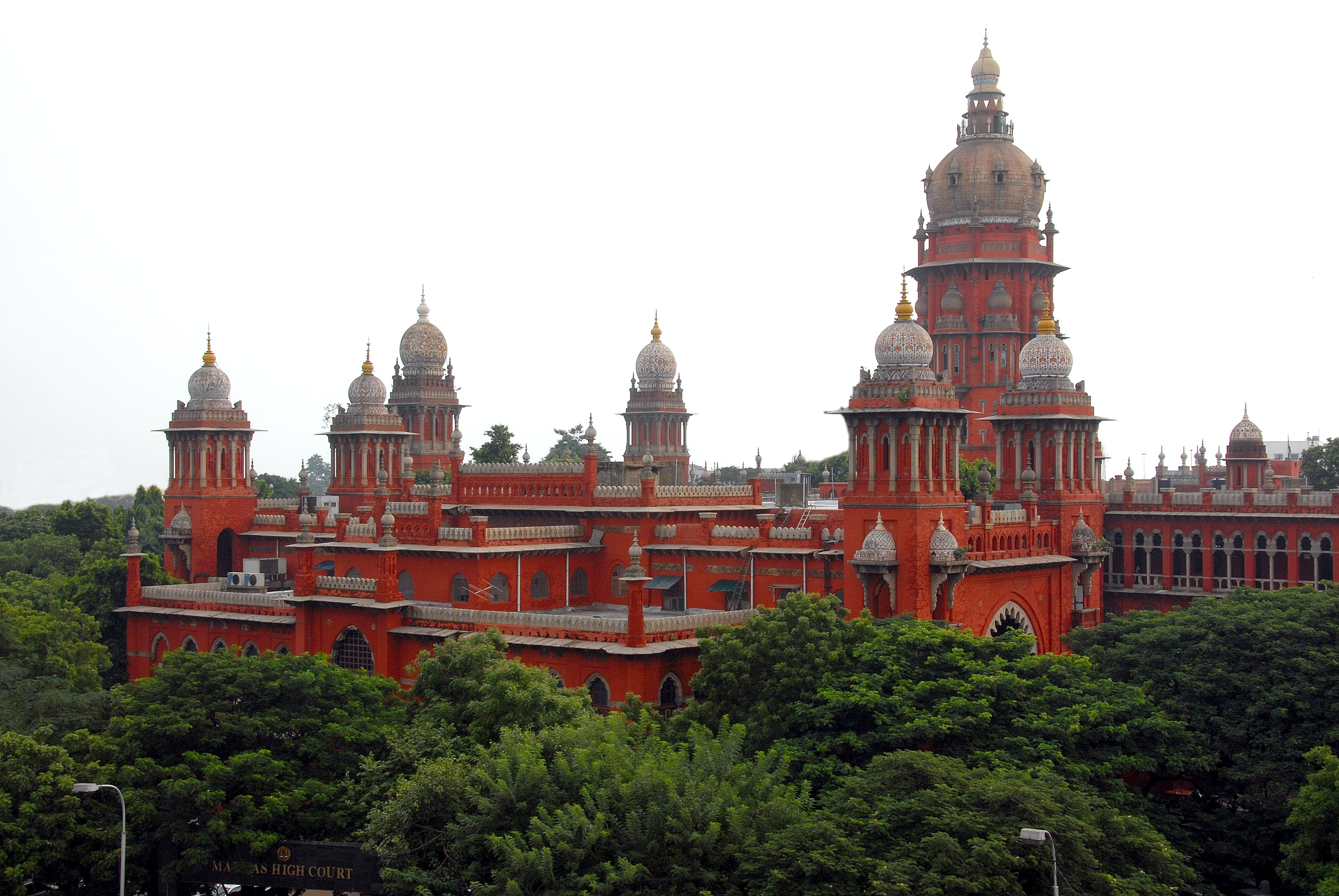
Madras High Court buildings are a prime example of Indo-Saracenic architecture, designed by JW Brassington under guidance of British architect Henry Irwin.

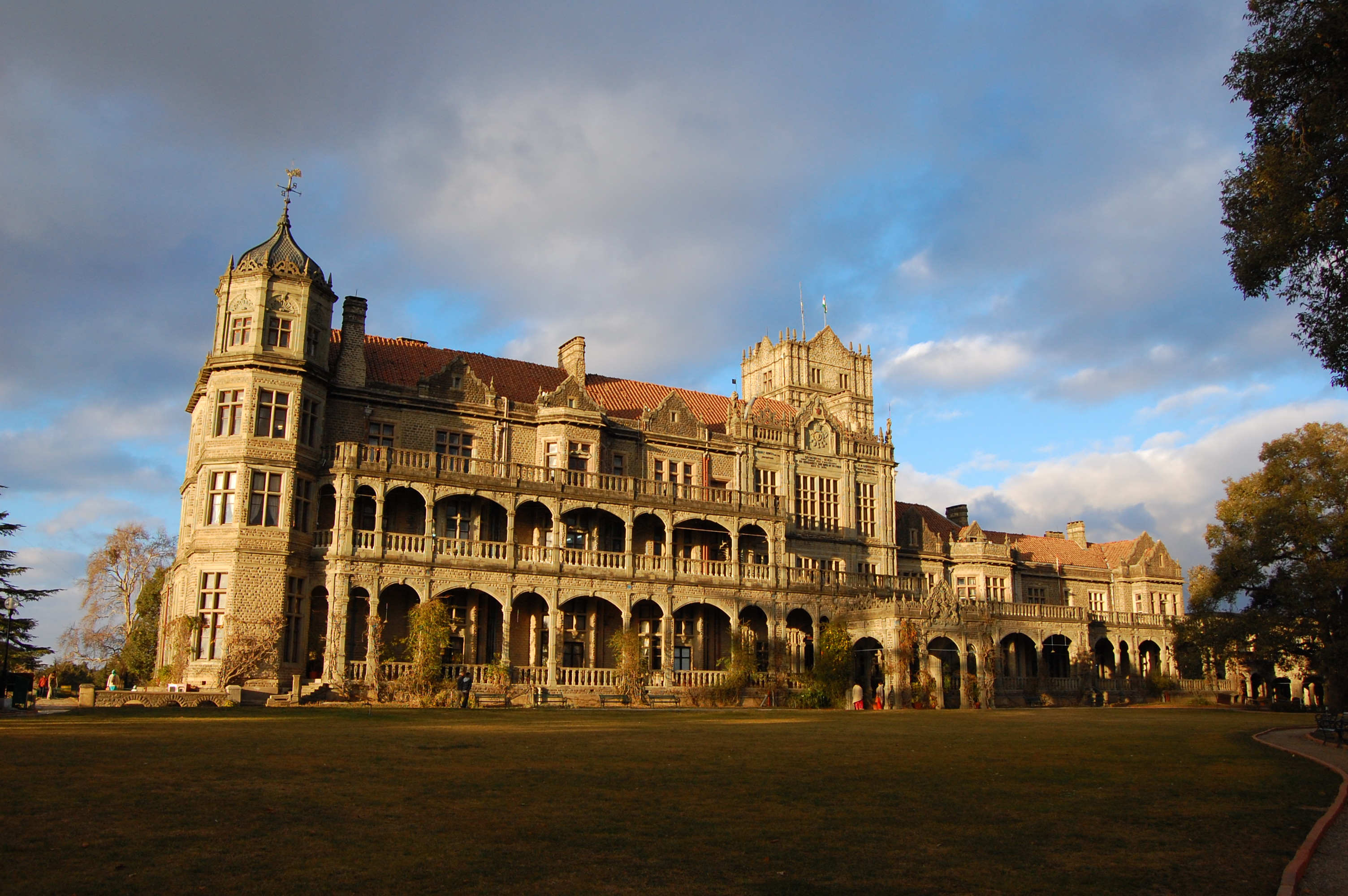
The Viceregal Lodge, now Rashtrapati Niwas, in Shimla designed by Henry Irwin in the Jacobethan style and built in the late 19th century.

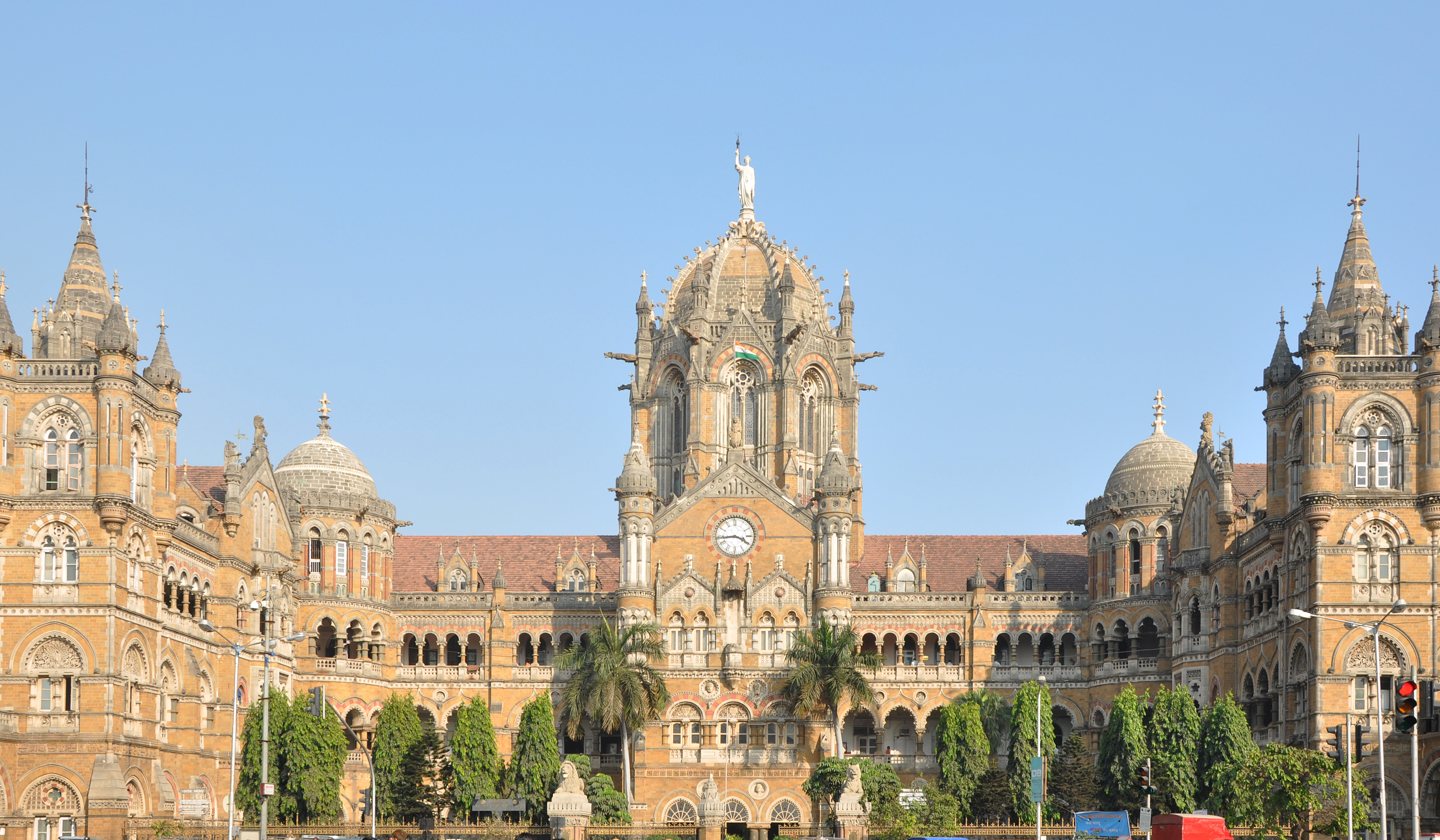
The Chhatrapati Shivaji Maharaj Terminus (previously Victoria Terminus) in Mumbai, 1878–88, is a mixture of Romanesque, Gothic and Indian elements.

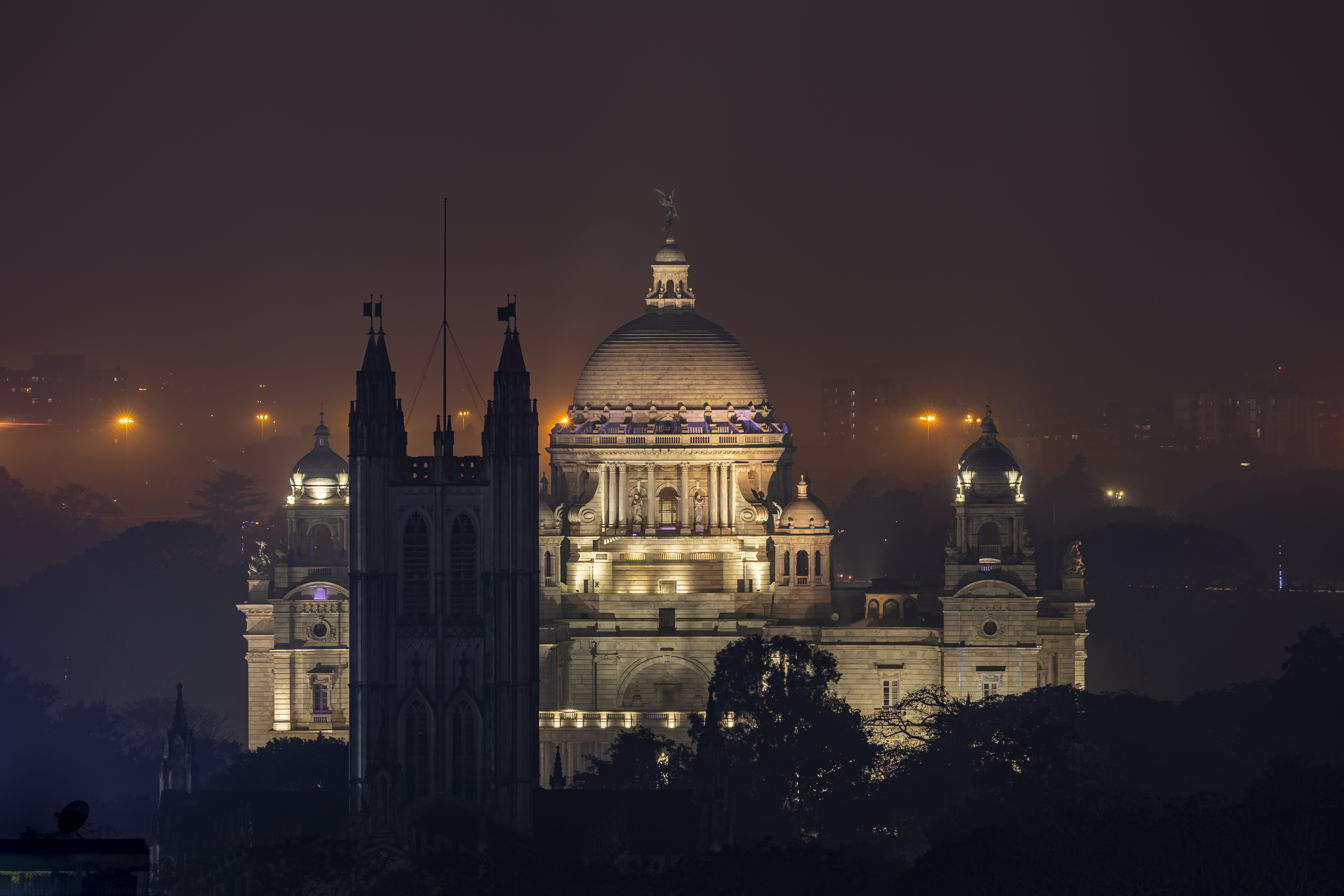
The Victoria Memorial in Calcutta is the most effective symbolism of British Empire.

Black Town described in 1855 as "the minor streets, occupied by the natives are numerous, irregular and of various dimensions. Many of them are extremely narrow and ill-ventilated ... a hallow square, the rooms opening into a courtyard in the centre." Garden houses were originally used as weekend houses for recreational use by the upper class British. Nonetheless, the garden house became ideal a full-time dwelling, deserting the fort in the 19th Century.

Mumbai (Bombay) has some of the most prominent examples of British colonial architecture. This included Gothic Revival (Victoria terminus, University of Bombay, Rajabai Clock Tower, Bombay High Court, BMC Building), Indo-Saracenic (Prince of Wales Museum, Gateway of India, Taj Mahal Palace Hotel) and Art Deco (Eros Cinema, New India Assurance Building).

Madras and Calcutta were similarly bordered by water and division of Indian in the north and British in the south. An Englishwoman noted in 1750 "the banks of the river are as one may say absolutely studded with elegant mansions called here as at Madras, garden houses." Esplanade-row is fronts the fort with lined palaces. Indian villages in these areas consisted of clay and straw houses which later transformed into the metropolis of brick and stone.The Chepauk Palace in the city, designed by Paul Benfield, is said to be the first Indo-Saracenic building in India. Since then, many of the colonial-era buildings in the city were designed in this style of architecture, which is most apparent around the Fort St. George built in 1640. Most of these were designed by English architects Robert Fellowes Chisholm and Henry Irwin. The best examples of this style include the Madras High Court (built in 1892), Southern Railway headquarters, Ripon Building, Government Museum, Senate House of the University of Madras, Amir Mahal, Bharat Insurance Building, Victoria Public Hall and the College of Engineering. The Triumph of Labour, also known as the Labour statue, at the Marina Beach is an important landmark of Madras.

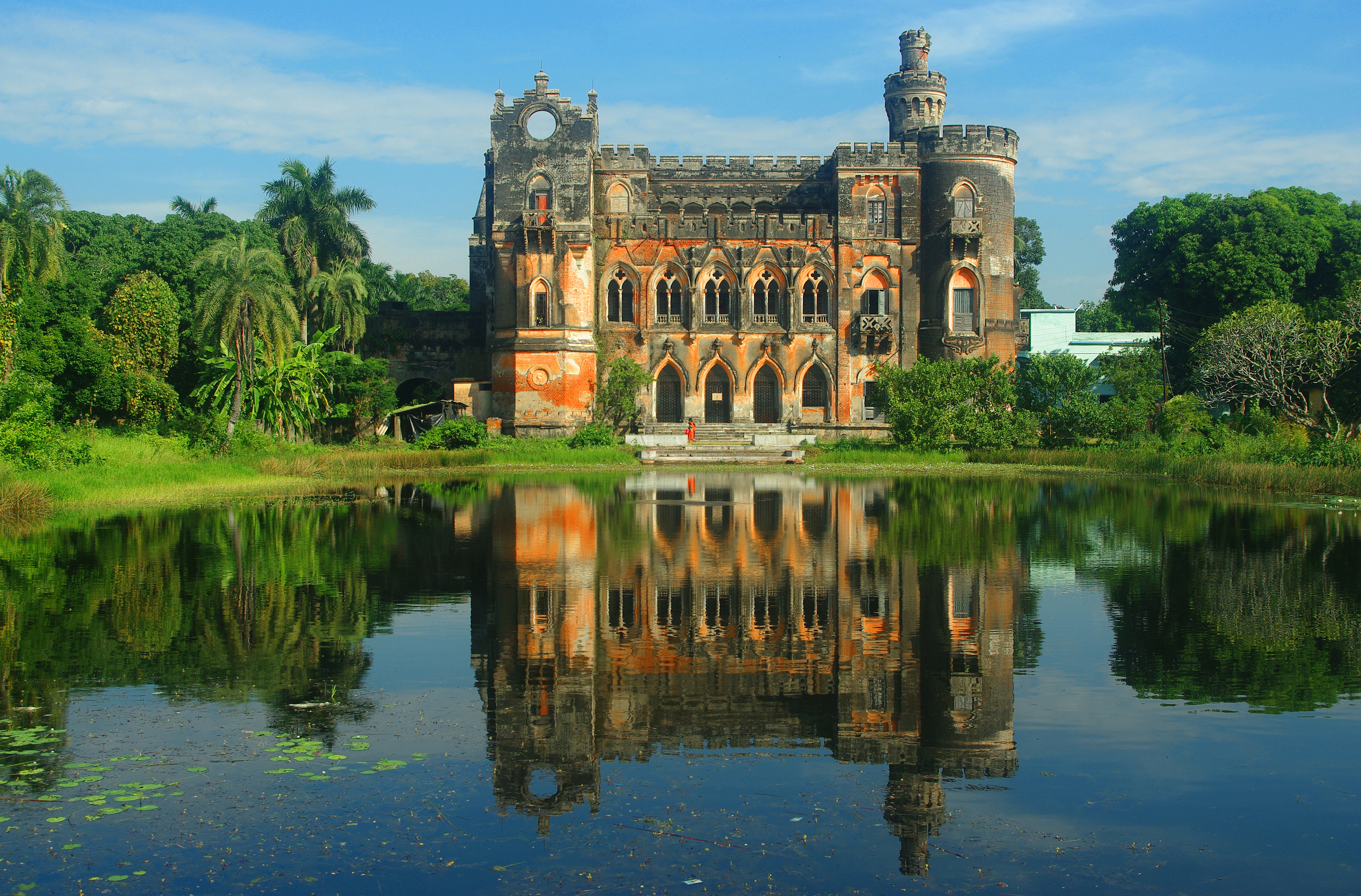
Gaine Castle at Dhanyakuria, West Bengal

Indo-Saracenic architecture evolved by combining Indian architectural features with European styles. Vincent Esch and George Wittet were pioneers in this style. The Victoria Memorial in Calcutta is the most effective symbolism of British Empire, built as a monument in tribute to Queen Victoria's reign. The plan of the building consists of one large central part covered with a larger dome. Colonnades separate the two chambers. Each corner holds a smaller dome and is floored with marble plinth. The memorial stands on 26 hectares of garden surrounded by reflective pools.

The period of British rule saw wealthy Bengali families (especially zamindar estates) employing European firms to design houses and palaces. The Indo-Saracenic movement was strongly prevalent in the region. While most rural estates featured an elegant country house, the cities of Calcutta had widespread 19th- and early 20th-century urban architecture, comparable to London, Sydney or Auckland. Art deco influences began in Calcutta in the 1930s.

==== Romanesque-Italianate ====
The Italianate architectural style was popularised in early Victorian Britain and subsequently became an attractive form adopted in India in the later parts of the 19th century. The main characteristics of this style include imposing cornice structures, prominent cornice and corbels, Roman arches, arch headed or pedimented windows, flat or ‘hip’ roof, and windows with distinctive moulded caps. The one outstanding building in this class was the East Indian Railway Head Offices at Calcutta built in 1884.

==== Neoclassical ====
Neoclassical buildings are characterized by their magnificence of scale, the prominent use of columns, the use of geometric forms and symmetry, predominantly blank walls and the triangular pediment. Some large private houses were built in and around Kolkata by wealthy merchants. Examples of Neoclassical architecture in Indian public buildings include the British Residency, Hyderabad (1798) and Falaknuma Palace (1893) in Hyderabad, St Andrews Church in Madras (1821), Raj Bhawan (1803) and Metcalfe Hall (1844) in Kolkata, and Bangalore Town Hall (1935) in Bangalore.

Neoclassicism

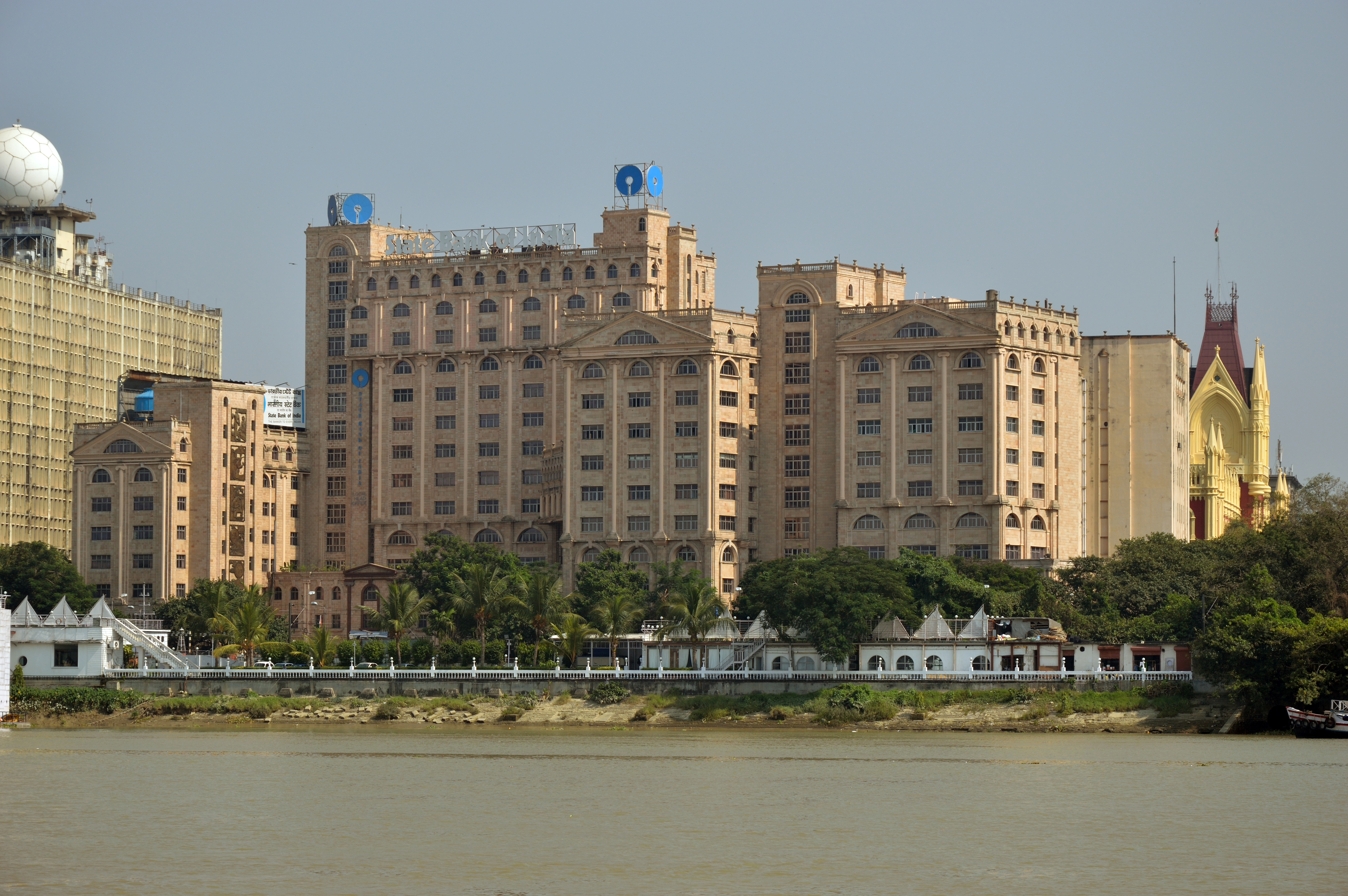
Samriddhi Bhavan, High Court(right), Secretariat(left) on River Hooghly

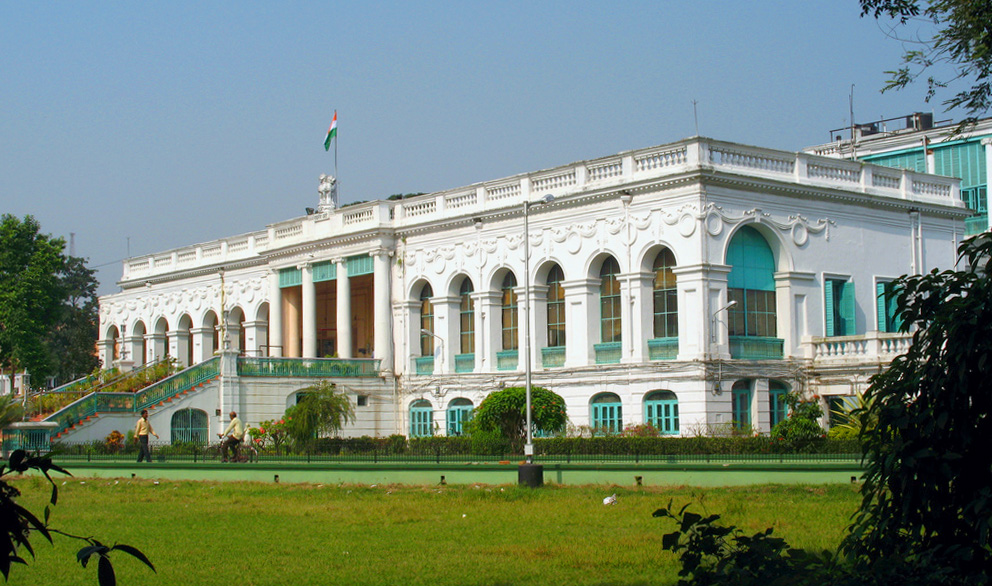
National library of India, Kolkata

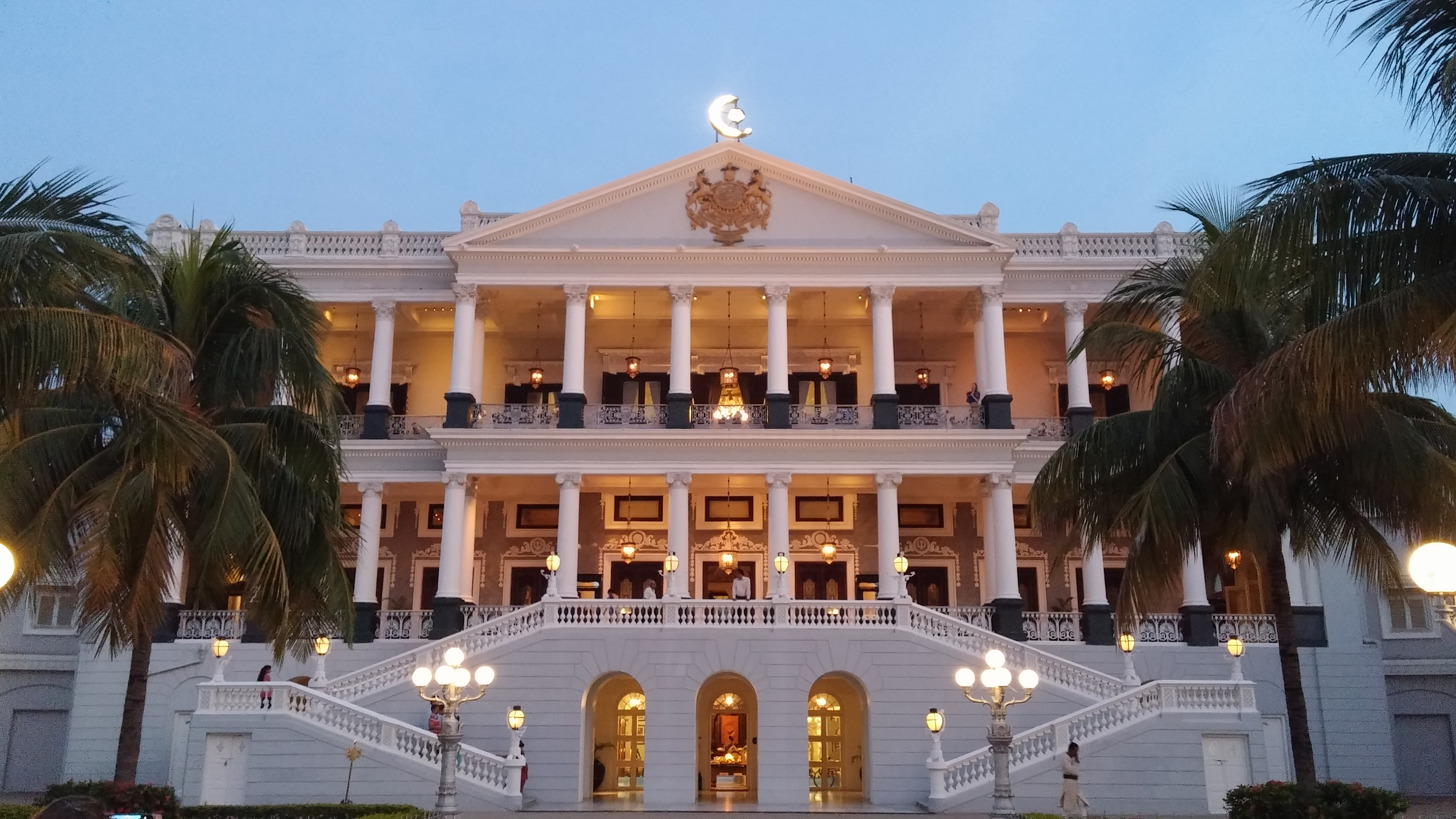
Falaknuma Palace, Hyderabad

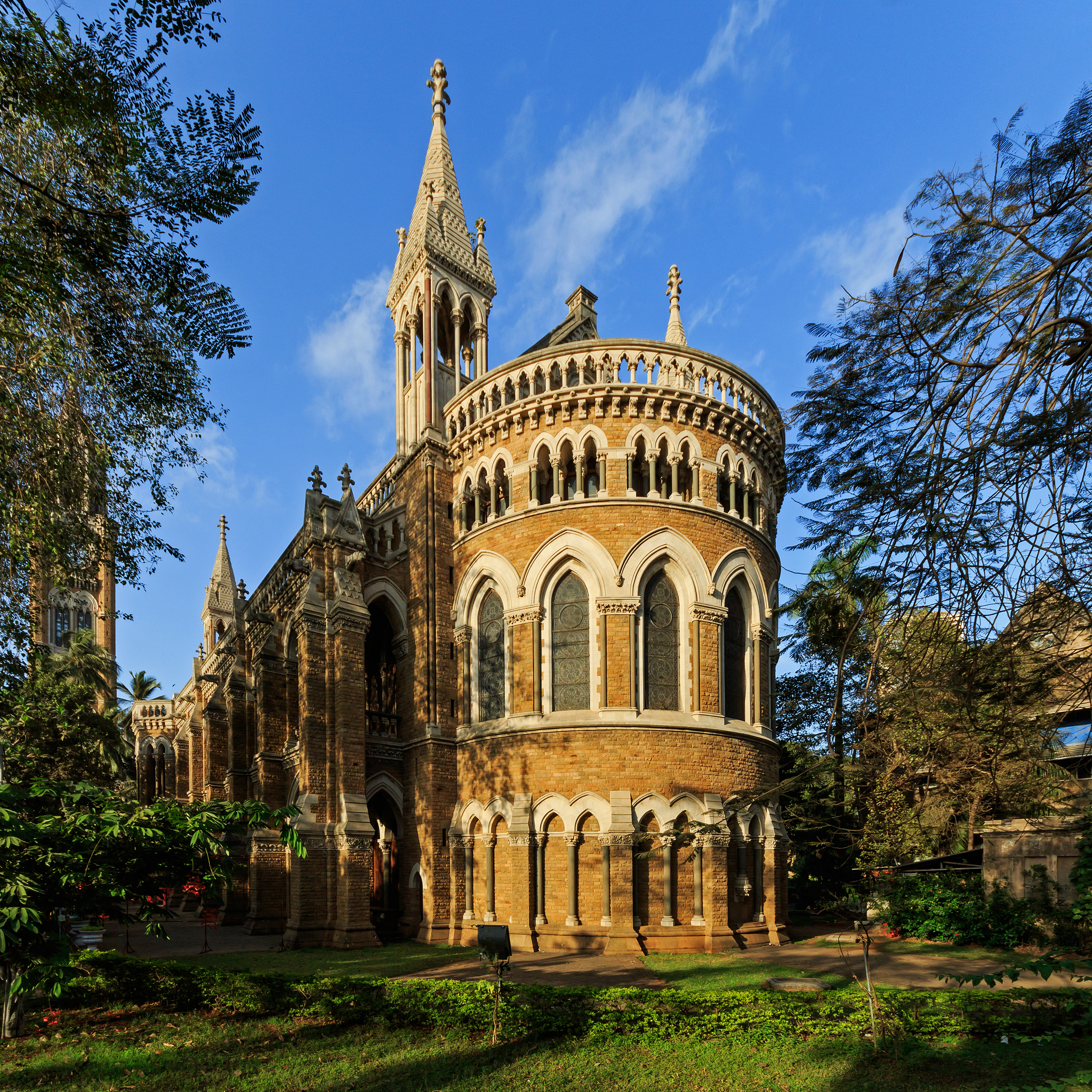
Mumbai University

=== Art Deco ===
Art Deco

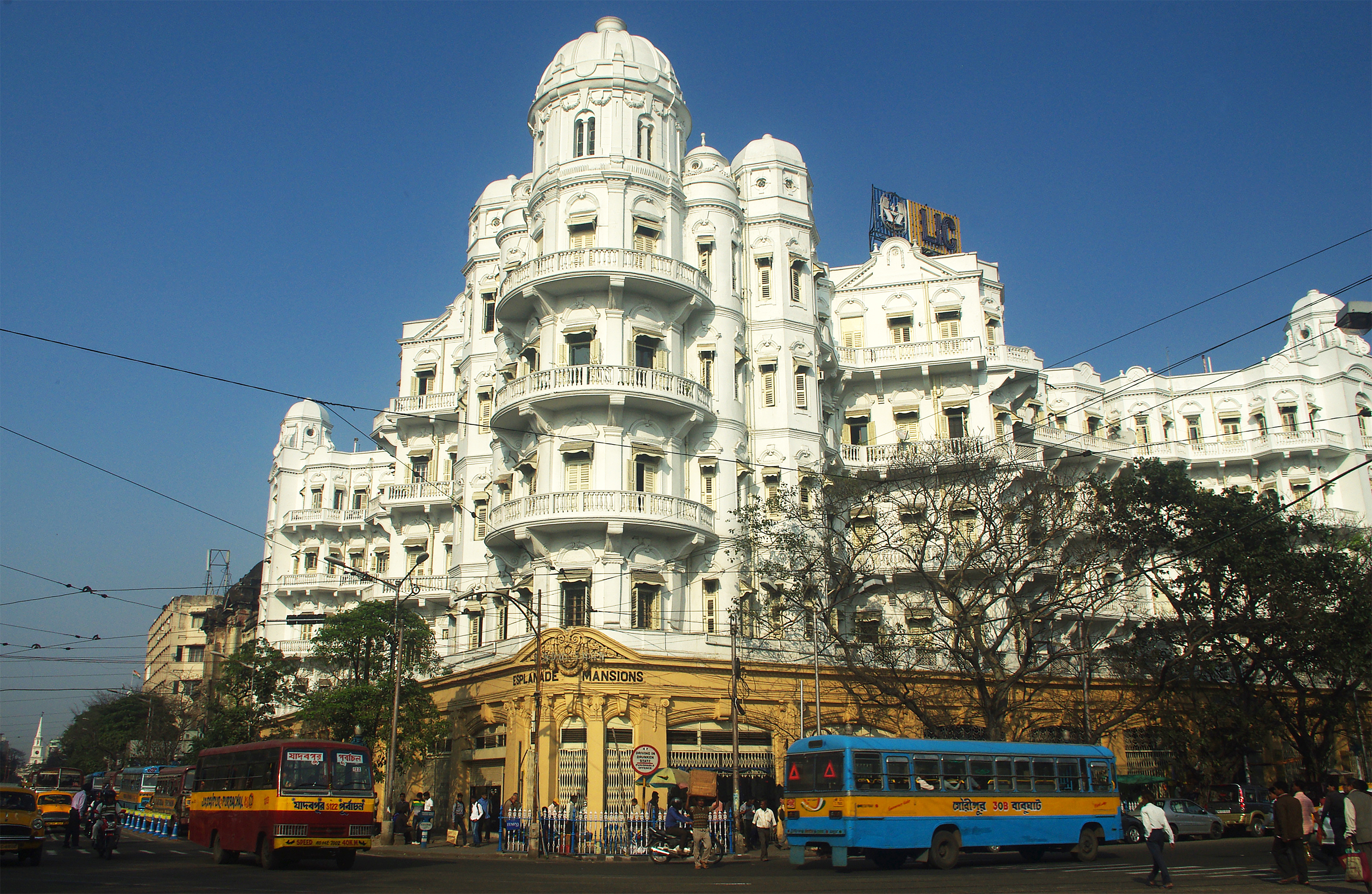
Esplanade Mansions, Kolkata

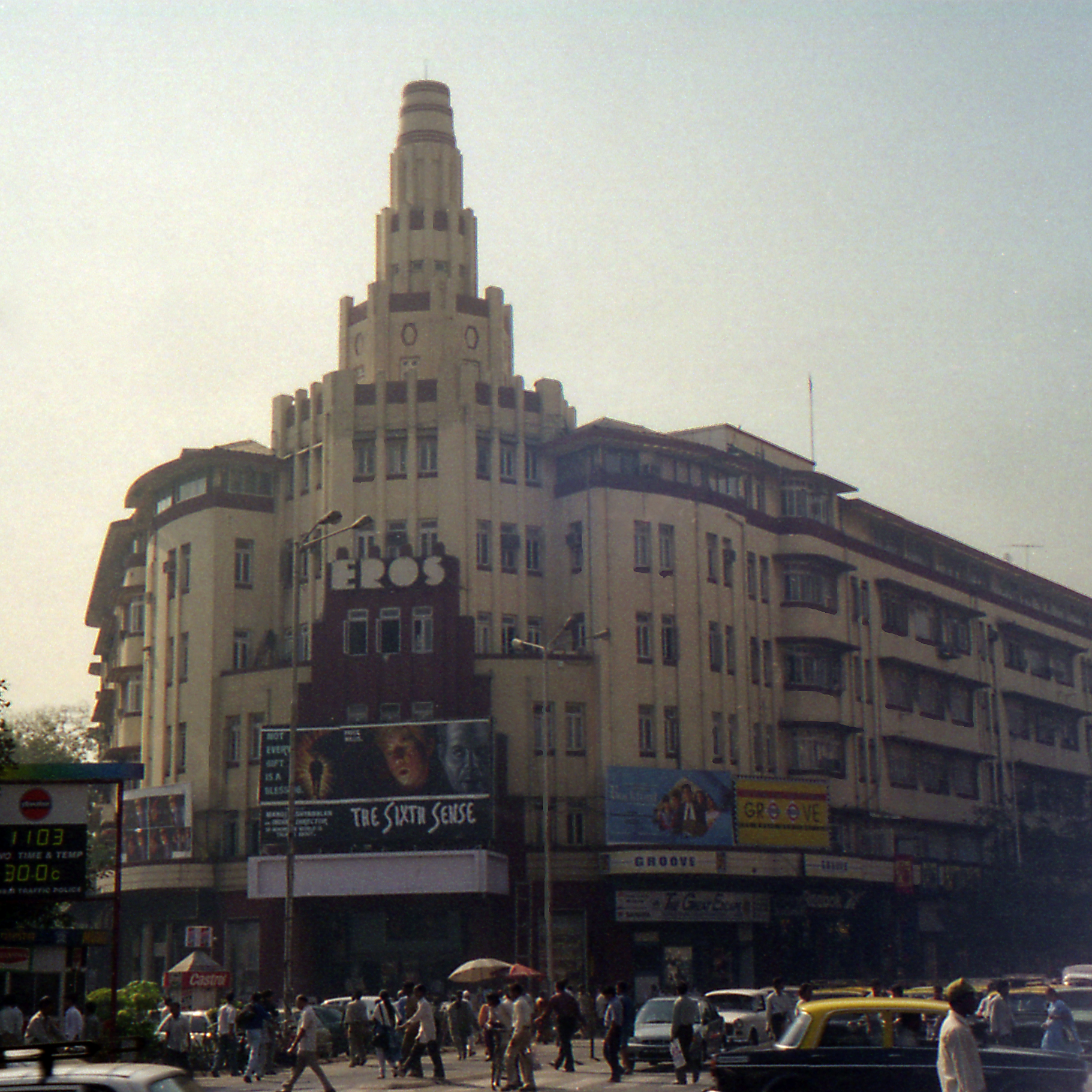
Eros Cinema, Mumbai

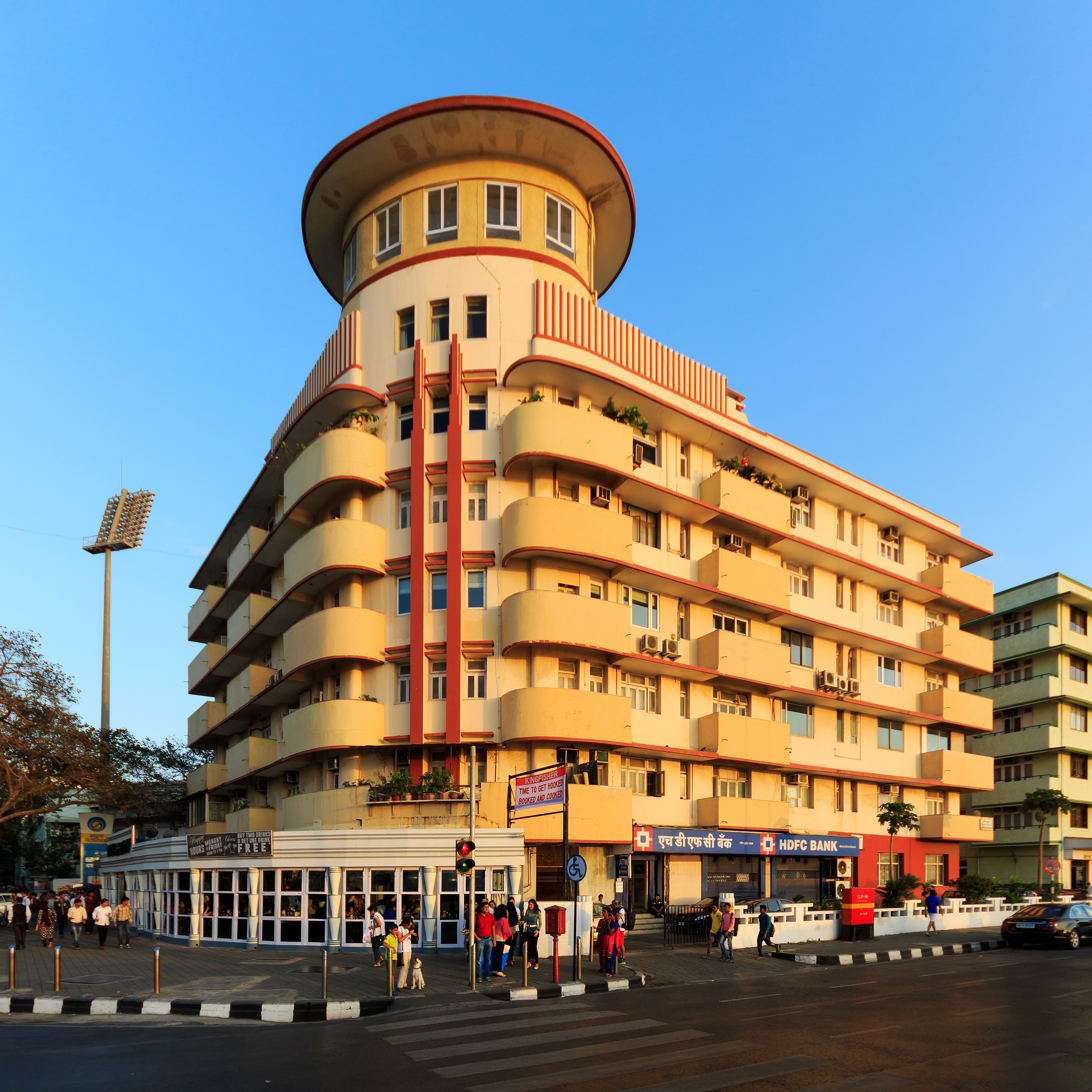
Art Deco style apartments in Marine Drive, Mumbai

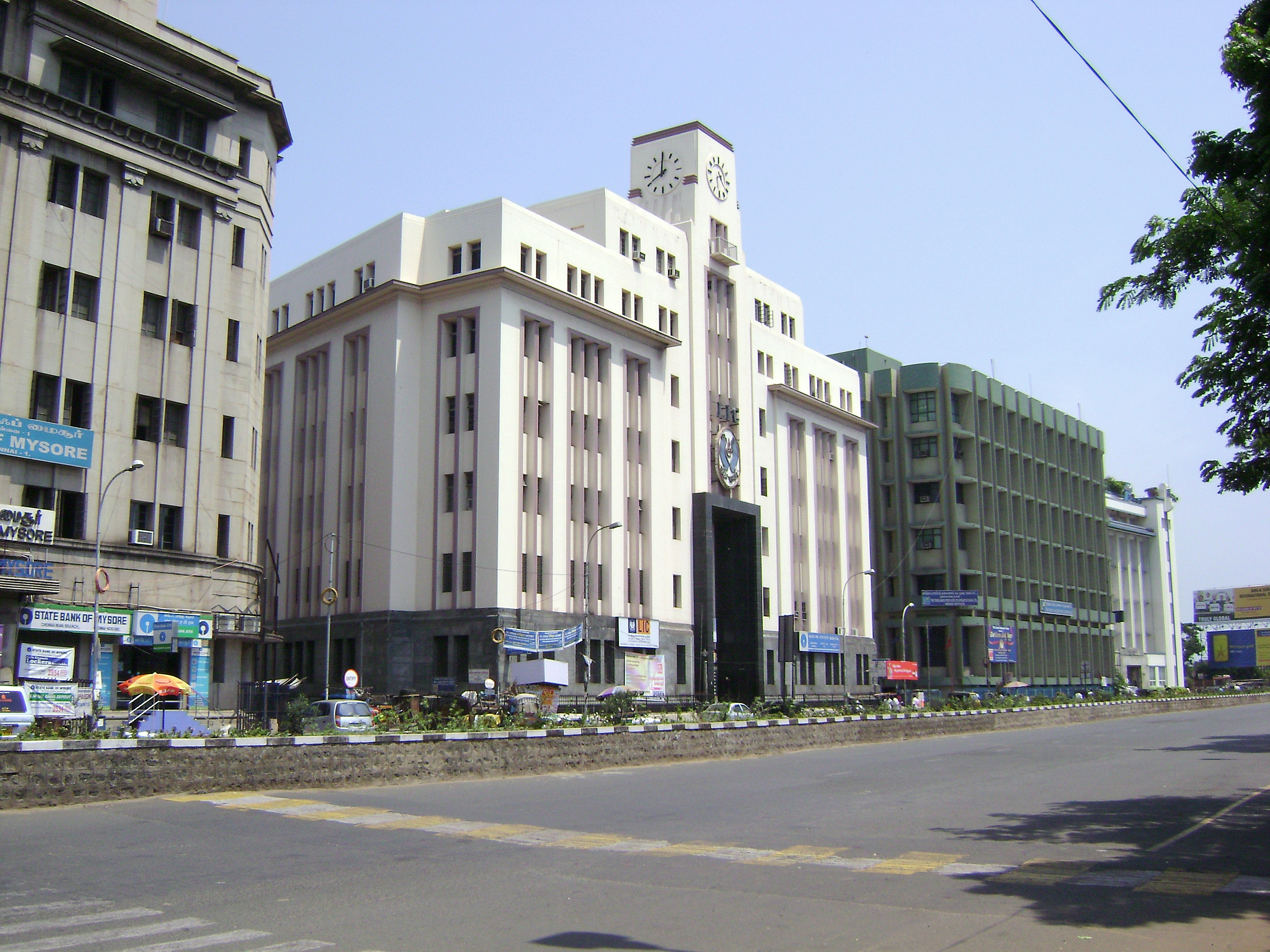
Parrys Corner, Chennai

The Art Deco movement of the early 20th century quickly spread to large parts of the world. The Indian Institute of Architects, founded in Bombay in 1929, played a prominent role in propagating the movement. Guided by their desire to emulate the west, the Indian architects were fascinated by the industrial modernity that Art Deco offered. The western elites were the first to experiment with the technologically advanced facets of Art Deco, and architects began the process of transformation by the early 1930s.

Mumbai has the world's second-largest collection of Art Deco structures, after Miami. The New India Assurance Building, Eros Cinema and buildings along the Marine Drive in Mumbai are prime examples.

In Kolkata, the sole example of the Art Nouveau style, which preceded Art Deco, is the Esplanade Mansions opposite the Raj Bhavan, built in 1910.

=== Assam-type ===
Assam-type architecture is found in Assam and the Sylhet region. The houses constructed using this style are generally termed as Assam-type houses, and typically consist of one or more storeys. The houses are built to be earthquake-proof, and are made from materials ranging from wood and bamboo to steel and concrete.

Assam-type houses are a type of designs developed by the colonial British administration in Assam after the massive earthquake of 1897. British engineers modified the traditional Assamese houses made from mud-plastered bamboo walls and thatched roofs to make Assam-type houses with wood, reed, mud plaster and hay after studying the climate and topography of the entire region.

Buildings are constructed on both flat and sloped terrains. On flat grounds, the buildings are typically rectangular or L or C layout. On other surfaces, such as highlands, they are usually rectangular in shape, accessed via the hillside. The roof is typically erected by high gables to overcome heavy rainfall in the region, where walls are usually timber-framed, plastered with cement. With high ceilings and well-ventilated rooms, the floorings are either wooden or concrete with tiled, mosaic or stone surfacing with stilts.

=== Other Colonial Powers ===
Among the other European colonies were Portuguese Goa and Damaon and Portuguese Bombay and Bassein. The Madh Fort, St. John the Baptist Church and Castella de Aguada in Bombay are remnants of Portuguese colonial rule. The Churches and convents of Goa, an ensemble of seven churches built by the Portuguese in Goa are a UNESCO World Heritage Site.

The Portuguese were among the first European traders to discover the sea route to India as early as 1498. The first Portuguese encounter with India was on 20 May 1498 AD, when Vasco da Gama reached Calicut on the coast of the Malabar region.

The settlements along the Hooghly river — a branch of the Ganges — attracted maritime traders from as many European nations, turning that part of Bengal into a little Europe. The Portuguese set up post at Bandel, the Danish at Serampore, the Dutch at Chinsurah and the French at Chandernagore. A British military base came up in Barrackpore. Thus influencing neighbouring regions' architecture to create a distinct indo-colonial architecture.

The history of Pondicherry is recorded only after the arrival of Dutch, Portuguese, British and French traders. In 1674 the French East India Company set up a trading centre at Pondicherry and this outpost eventually became the administrative centre of French settlements in India. The city has many colonial buildings, churches, temples and statues which, combined with the town planning and French style avenues in the old part of town, still preserve much of the colonial ambiance.

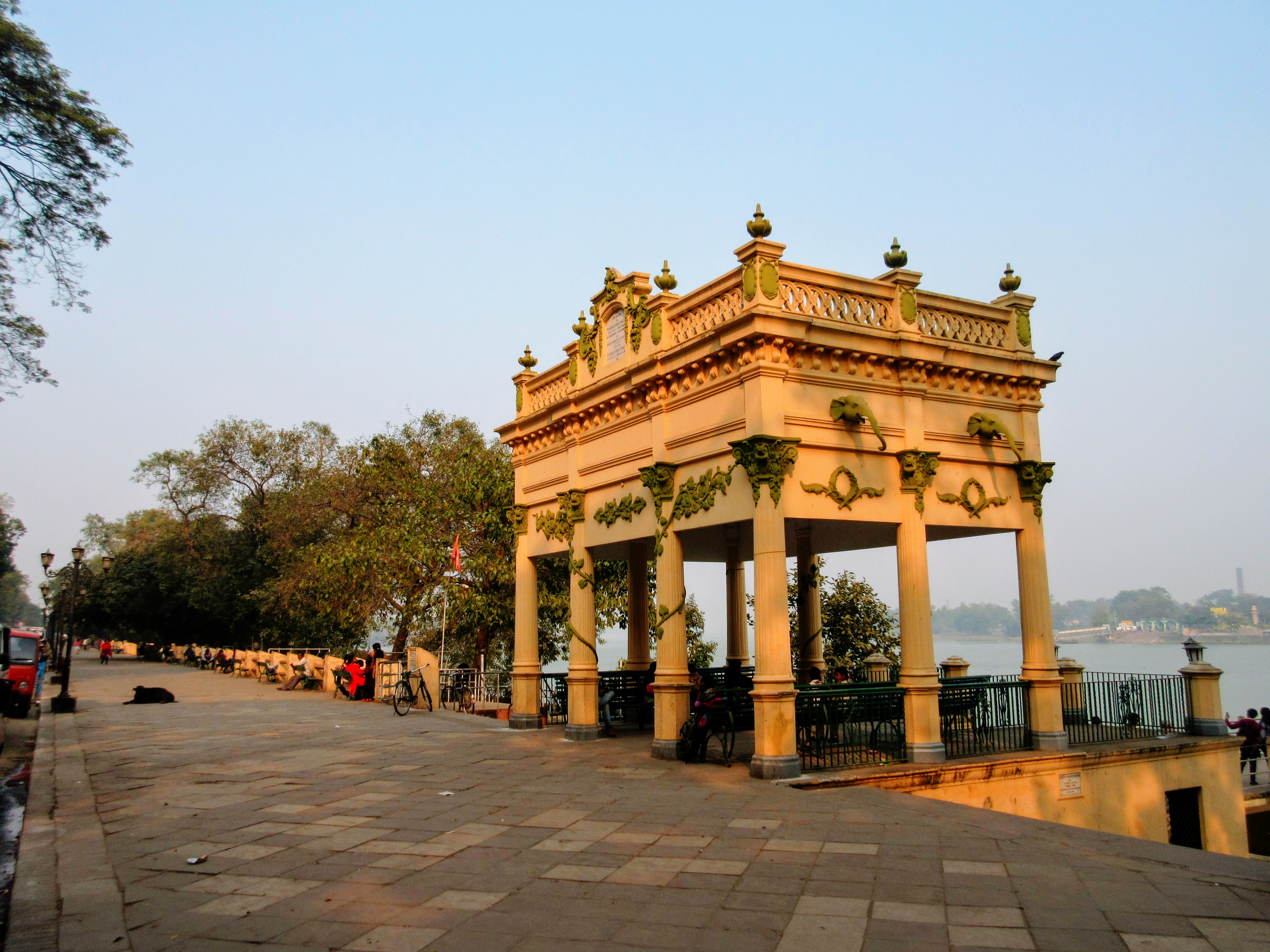
The Chandannagar Strand Ghat, reminiscences of a French colony, Chandannagar, West Bengal

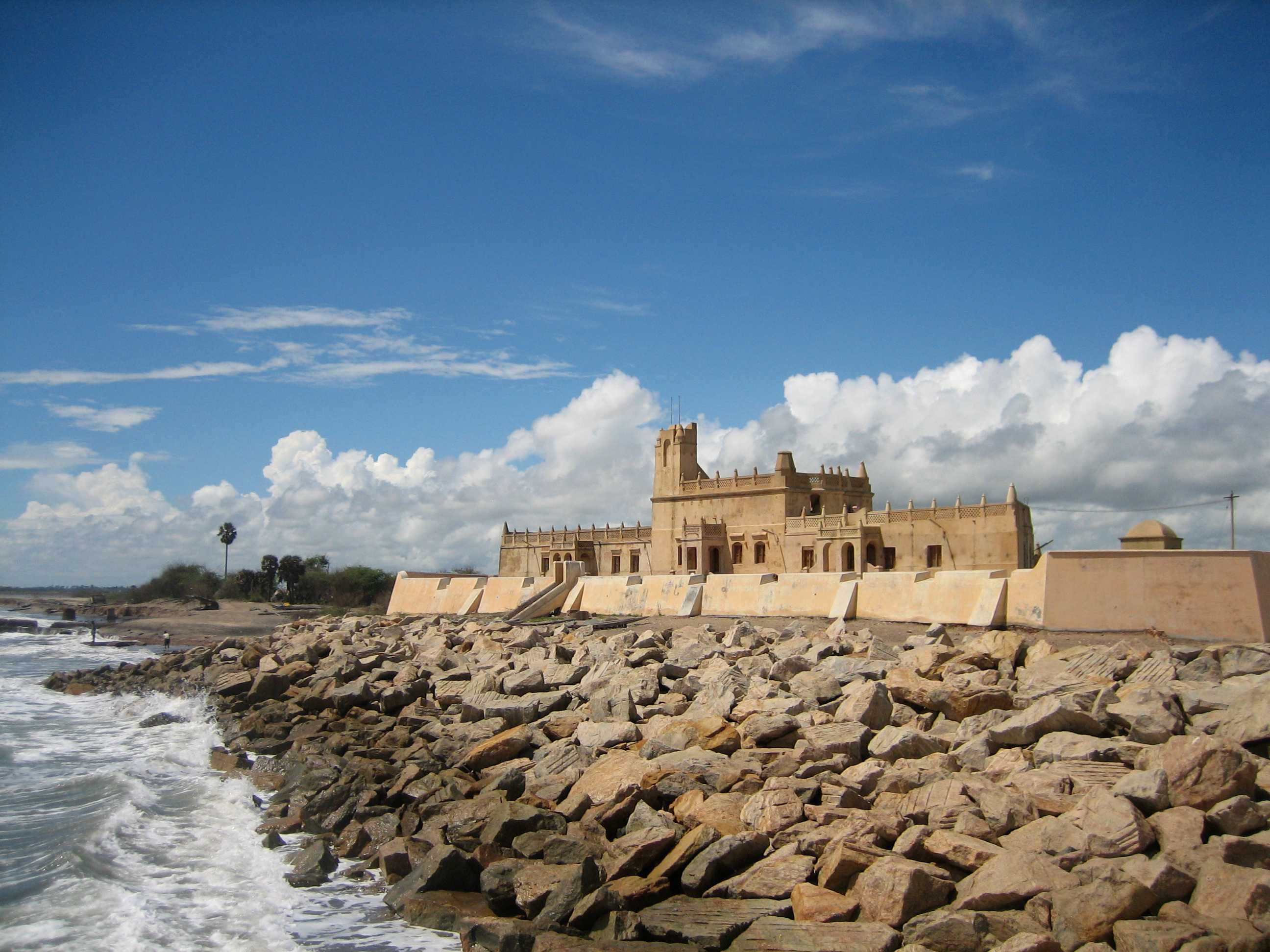
Fort Dansborg, built by the 17th century Danish admiral Ove Gjedde, reminiscences of Danish India, Tharangambadi, Tamil Nadu

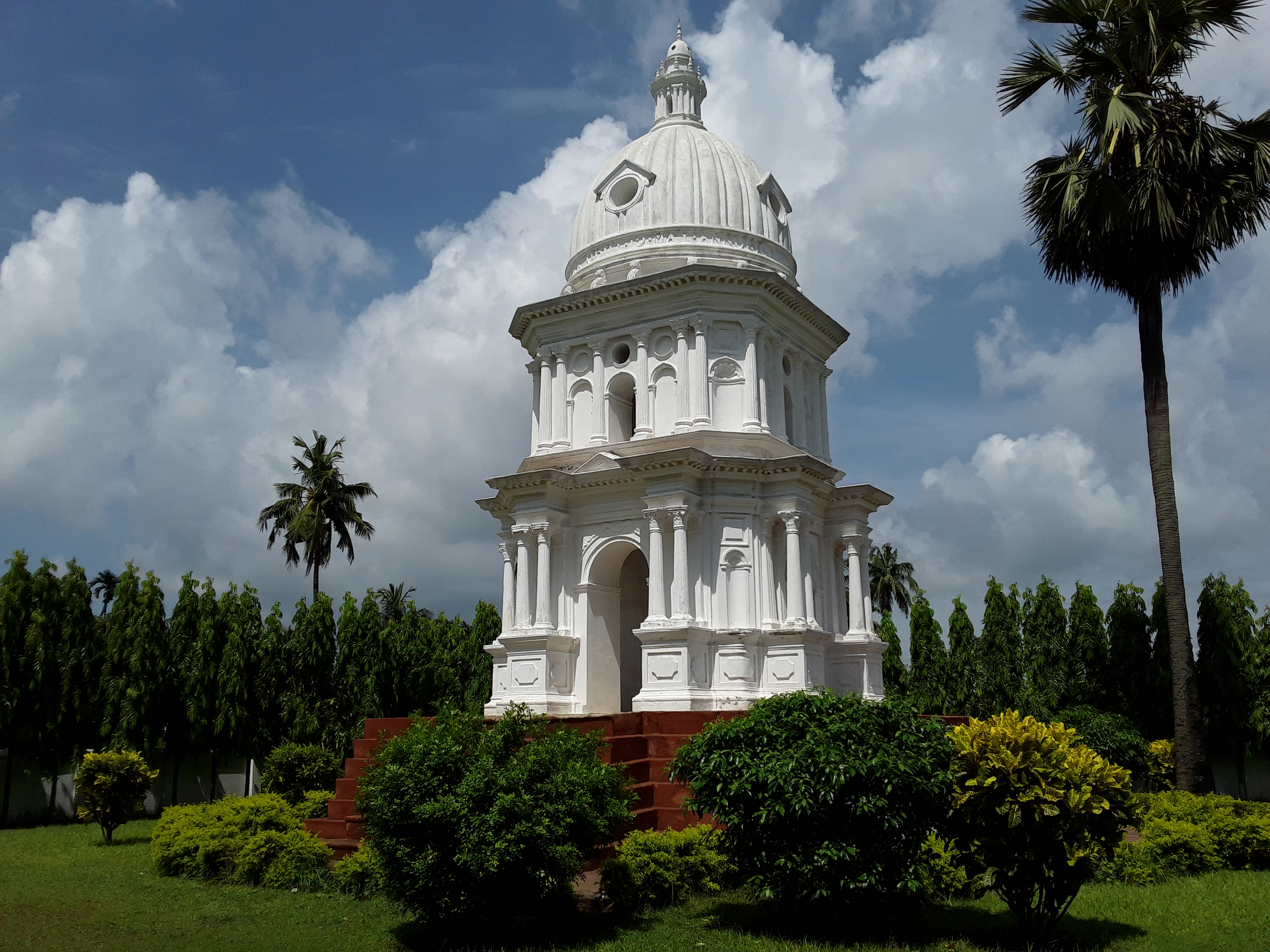
Tomb of Susanna Anna Maria, reminiscences of Dutch India, Chinsurah, West Bengal

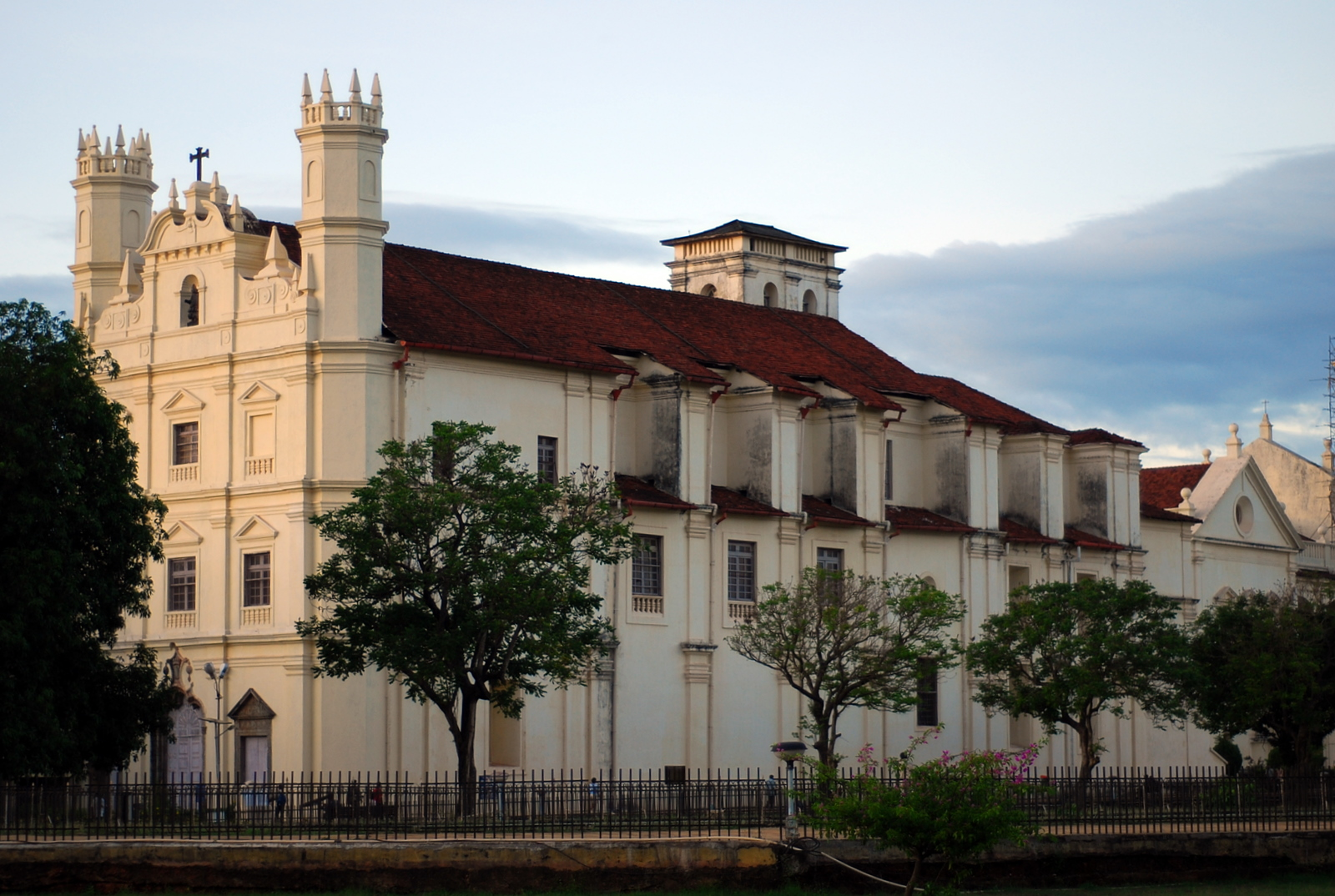
Church Of St Francis Of Assisi, reminiscent of Portuguese India, Goa

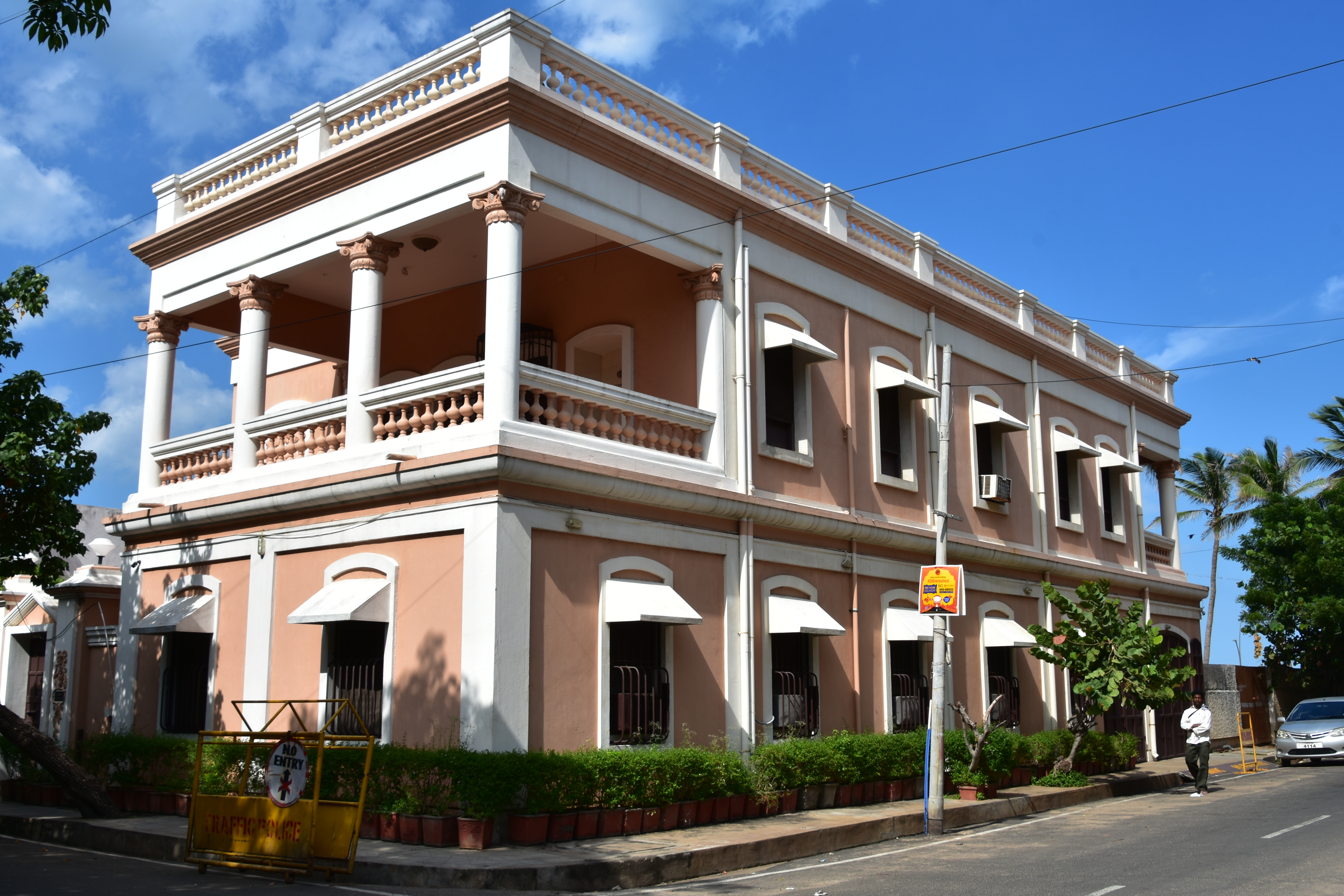
French Quarter, Pondicherry. The city became the chief French settlement in India.

== India after independence (1947 onwards) ==
Brutalism

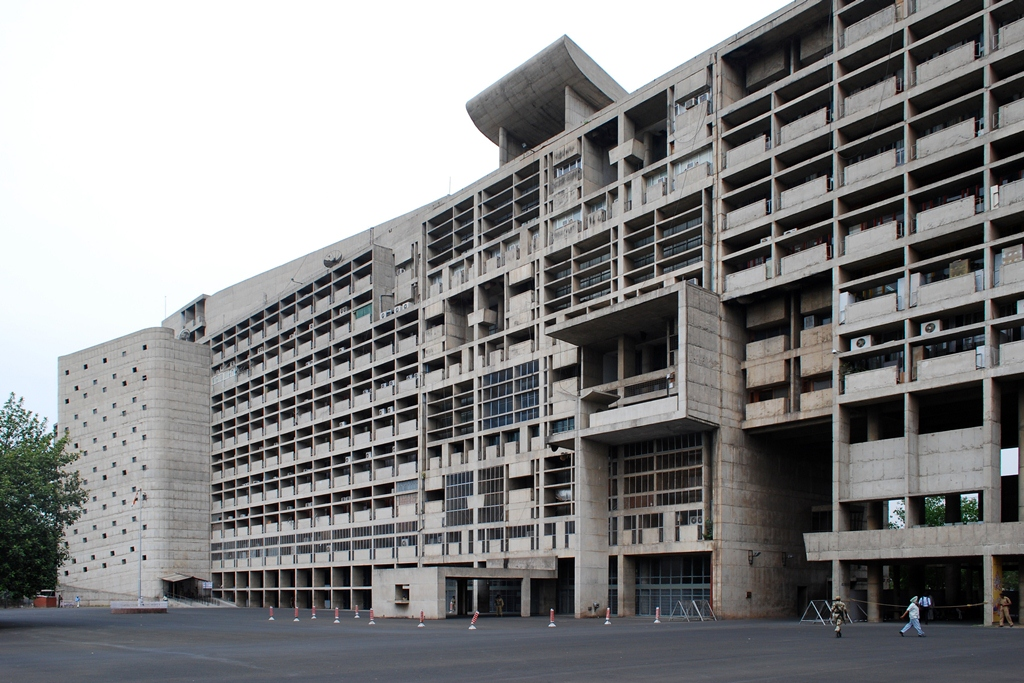
Secretariat Building, Chandigarh, Le Corbusier

IIT Delhi, J. K. Choudhury

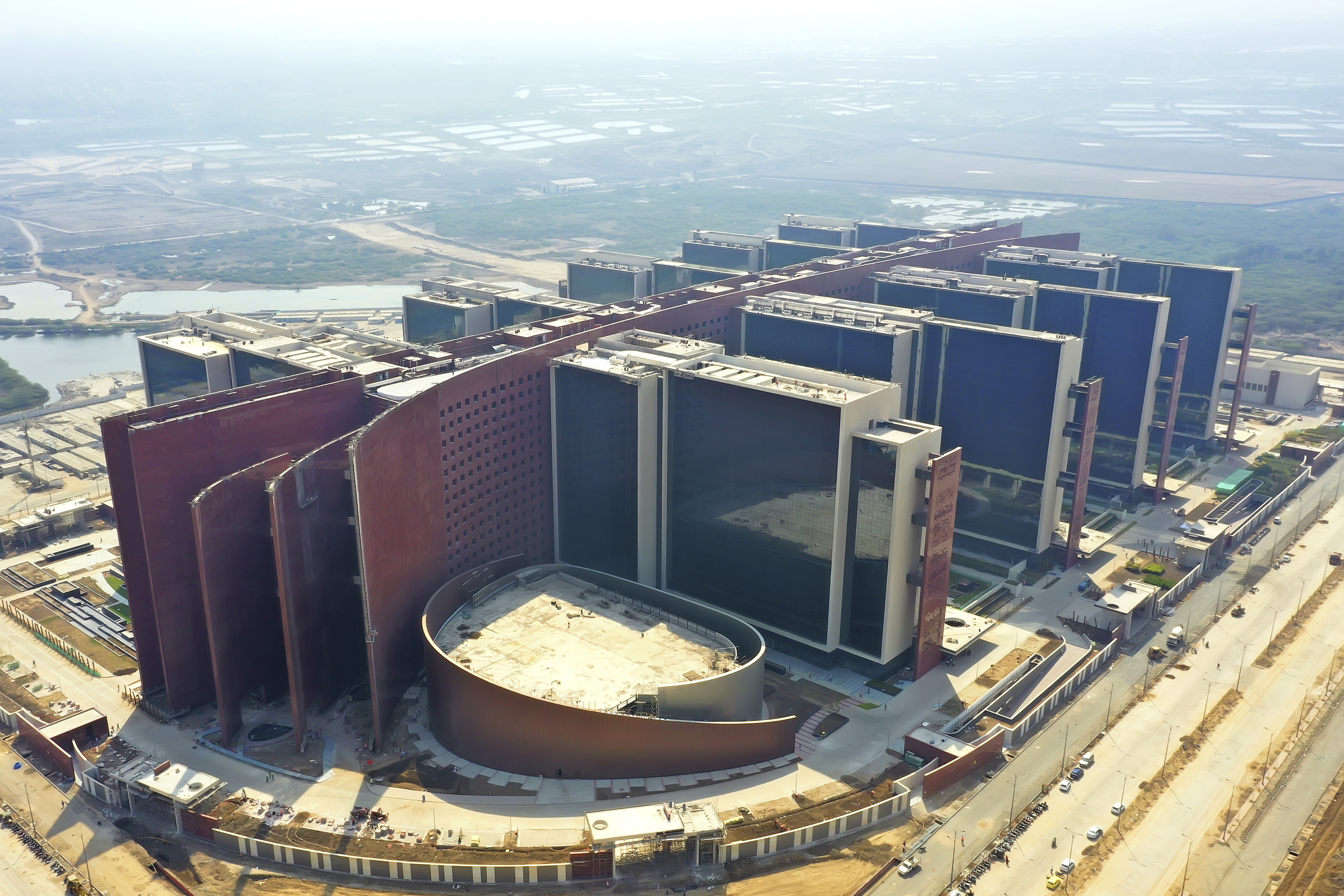
Surat Diamond Bourse (SDB), Manit Rastogi and Sonali Rastogi

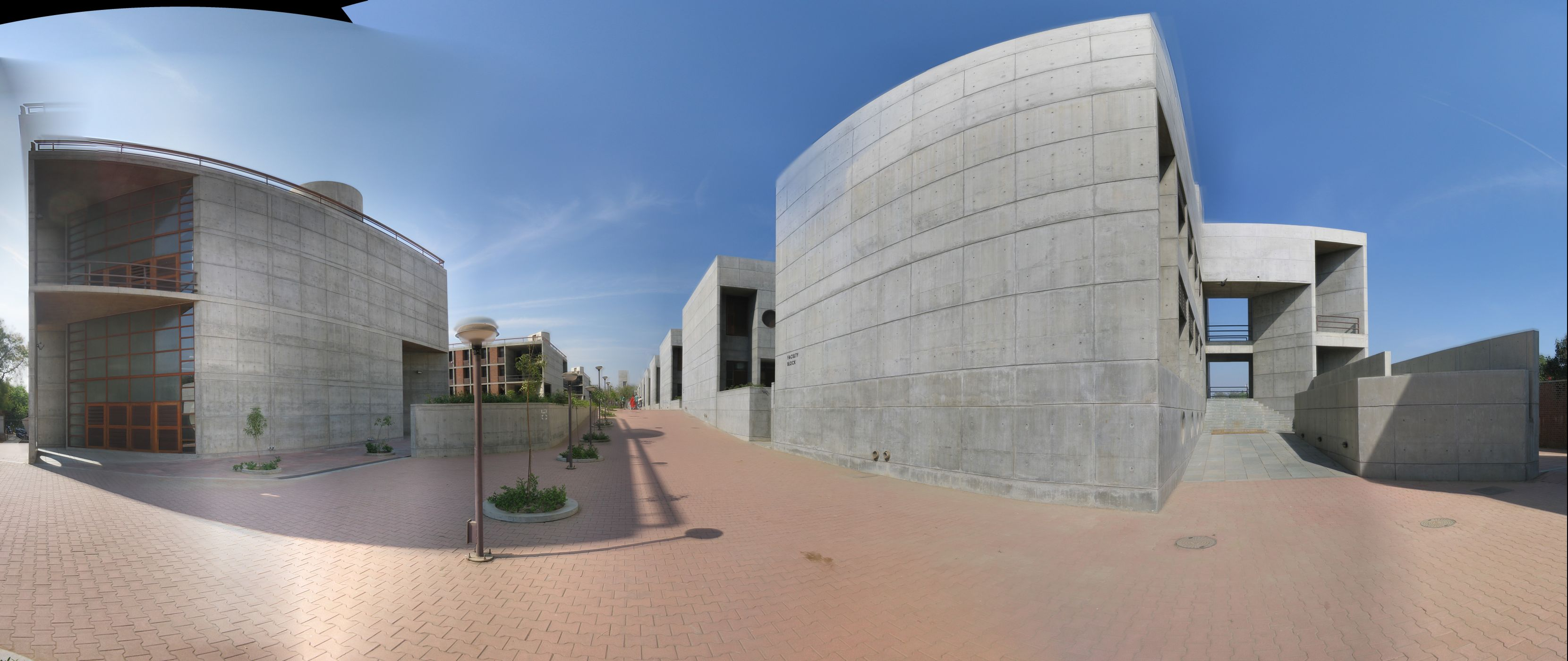
Indian Institute of Management Ahmedabad, Louis Kahn

At the time of India's independence from Britain, India had only about 300 trained architects in a population of what was then 330 million, and only one training institution, the Indian Institute of Architects. Thus the first generation of Indian architects were educated abroad. In recent times there has been a movement of population from rural areas to urban centres of industry, leading to price rise in property in various cities of India. Urban housing in India balances space constrictions and is aimed to serve the working class. Growing awareness of ecology has influenced architecture in India during modern times.

Climate responsive architecture has long been a feature of India's architecture but has been losing its significance as of late. Indian architecture reflects its various socio-cultural sensibilities which vary from region to region. Certain areas are traditionally held to be belonging to women. Villages in India have features such as courtyards, loggias, terraces and balconies. Calico, chintz, and palampore—of Indian origin—highlight the assimilation of Indian textiles in global interior design. Roshandans, which are skylights-cum-ventilators, are a common feature in Indian homes, especially in north India.

Some early architects were traditionalists, such as Ganesh Deolalikar, whose design for the Supreme Court imitated the Lutyens-Baker buildings down to the last detail, and B.R. Manickam, who designed the Vidhana Soudha in Bangalore revived the Dravidian architecture.

New European modernist and Brutalist styles of architecture started to take precedence in India's urban landscape following its establishment as a republic. Swiss-French architect Le Corbusier was commissioned by the Indian government to design the city of Chandigarh and its complex, which was classified as a UNESCO World Heritage Site and influenced a generation of architects towards modernism in the 20th century. Le Corbusier also designed the Sanskar Kendra at Ahmedabad. Corbusier inspired the next generation of architects in India to work with modern, rather than revivalist styles.

Economic liberalisation and consequent prosperity enabled more radical new styles to be tried along with a sense to compete with modern and western architectural standards.

Other prominent examples of modernist architecture in India include IIM Ahmedabad by Louis Kahn (1961), IIT Delhi by Jugal Kishore Chodhury (1961), IIT Kanpur by Achyut Kanvinde (1963), IIM Bangalore by B. V. Doshi (1973), Lotus Temple by Fariborz Sahba (1986), and Jawahar Kala Kendra (1992) and Vidhan Bhawan Bhopal (1996) by Charles Correa.

Skyscrapers built in the international style are becoming increasingly common in cities. This includes The 42 (2019) and The Imperial (2010) by Hafeez Contractor. Other projects of the 21st century include IIT Hyderabad by Christopher Benninger (2015).

== Landscape architecture ==
Taj Mahal Gardens plan

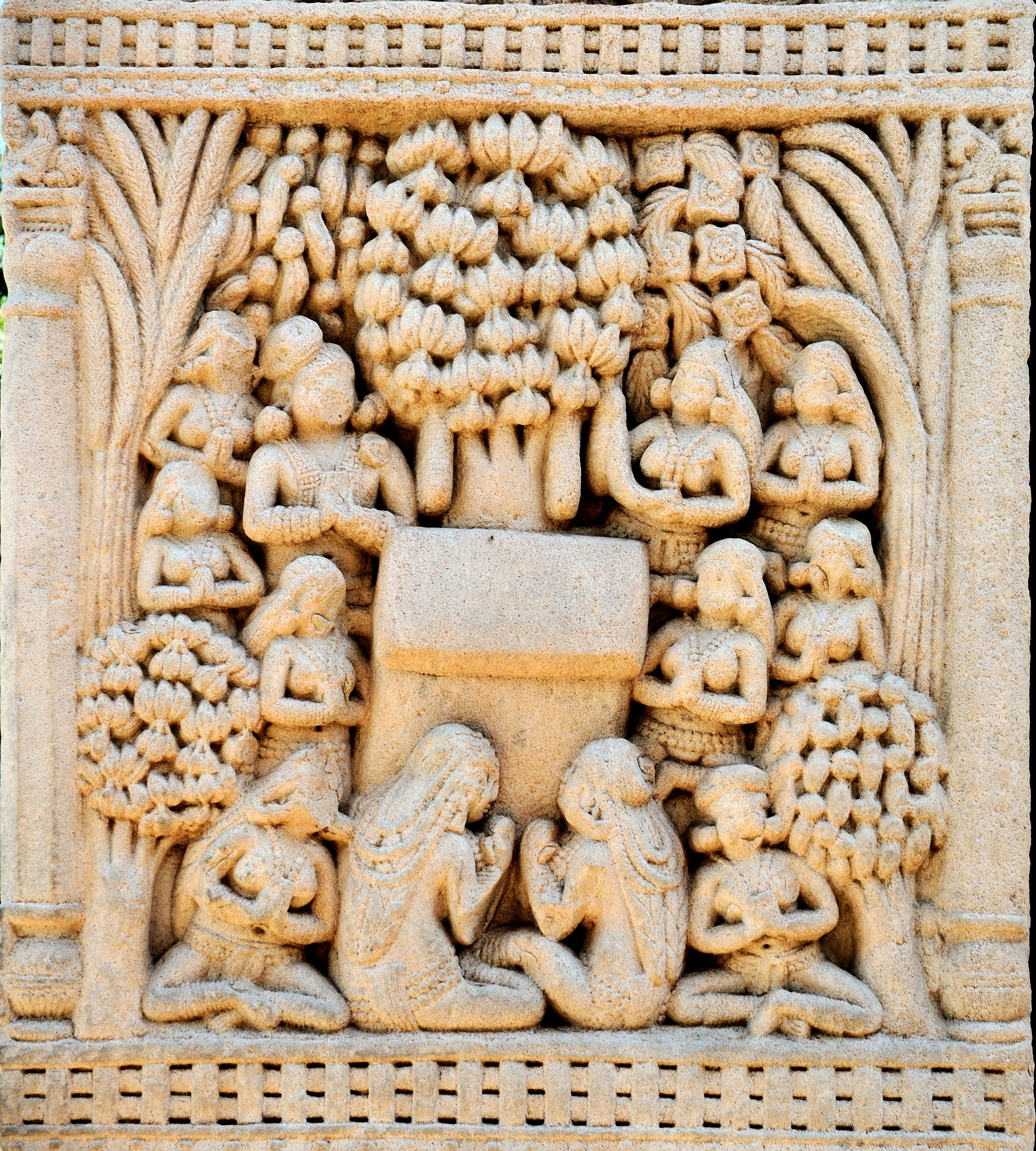
Bimbisara visiting a bamboo garden in Rajagriha

There is less archaeological evidence of early gardens elsewhere in India but the ancient Hindu sacred books give a remarkably detailed account of gardens in Ancient India.

During the Mauryan era, palaces took a central role and with it came the gardens. The Hindu scriptures (shastras) set down a code for the orientation and organization of buildings in relation to compass points, hills, water and plants. No physical form survived but rock carvings like in Ajanta Caves or in Stupas shows an existence of airy structures with timber columns. Those illustrations show vegetation alongside the platform and columns. Emperor Ashoka's inscriptions mention the establishment of botanical gardens for planting medicinal herbs, plants, and trees. They contained pools of water, were laid in grid patterns, and normally had chattri pavilions with them.

Hindu and Buddhist temple sites, from ancient times, have emphasized on 'Sacred Grooves' or medical gardens. Hindu and Buddhist Temples like in Mahabodhi and Chinese Buddhist pilgrim Xuanzang mentions accounts of Nalanda where "azure pool winds around the monasteries, adorned with the full-blown cups of the blue lotus; the dazzling red flowers of the lovely kanaka hang here and there, and outside groves of mango trees offer the inhabitants their dense and protective shade."

Manasollasa, a twelfth century text giving details on garden design, asserts that it should include rocks and raised mounds of summits, manicured with plants and trees of diverse varieties, artificial ponds, and flowing brooks. It describes the arrangement, the soils, the seeds, the distance between types of plants and trees, the methods of preparing manure, proper fertilizing and maintaining the garden, which plants and trees are best planted first, when to plant others, watering, signs of overwatering and underwatering, weeds, means of protecting the garden, and other details.

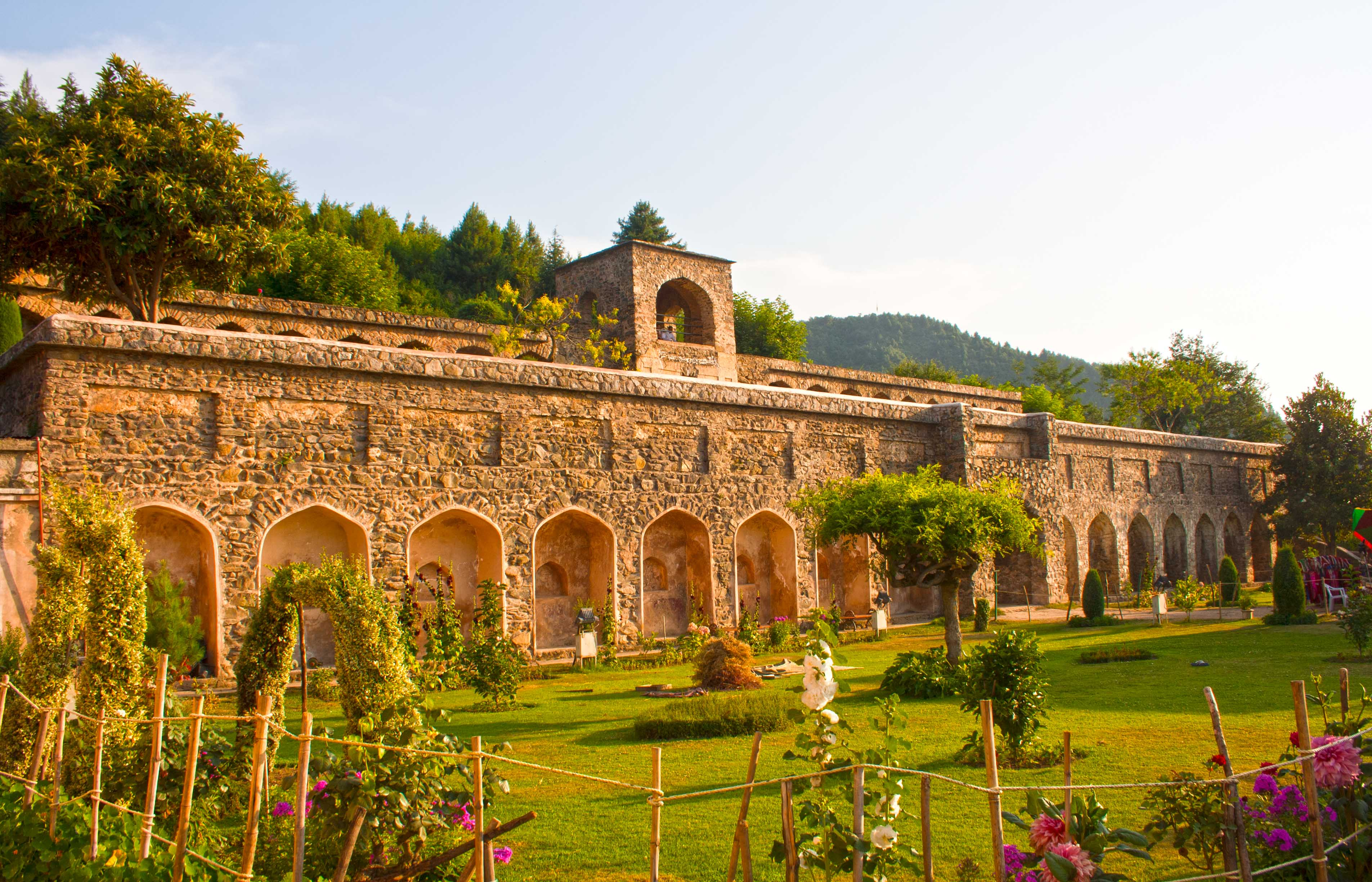
Pari Mahal

Early Islamic dynasties, like of Delhi Sultanates, never showed interests on gardens with an exception of Lodhi Dynasty. Mughals along with the Hindu Rajputs ushered a new era of garden architecture. Concepts like Charbagh (four gardens) came from Persia. In the Charbagh at the Taj Mahal, each of the four parts contains sixteen flower beds.

Fountain and running water was a key feature of Mughal garden design. Water-lifting devices like geared Persian wheels (saqiya) were used for irrigation and to feed the water-courses at Humayun's Tomb in Delhi, Akbar's Gardens in Sikandra and Fatehpur Sikhri, the Lotus Garden of Babur at Dholpur and the Shalimar Bagh in Srinagar.

Royal canals were built from rivers to channel water to Delhi and Fatehpur Sikhri. The fountains and water-chutes of Mughal gardens represented the resurrection and regrowth of life, as well as to represent the cool, mountainous streams of Central Asia and Afghanistan that Babur was famously fond of.

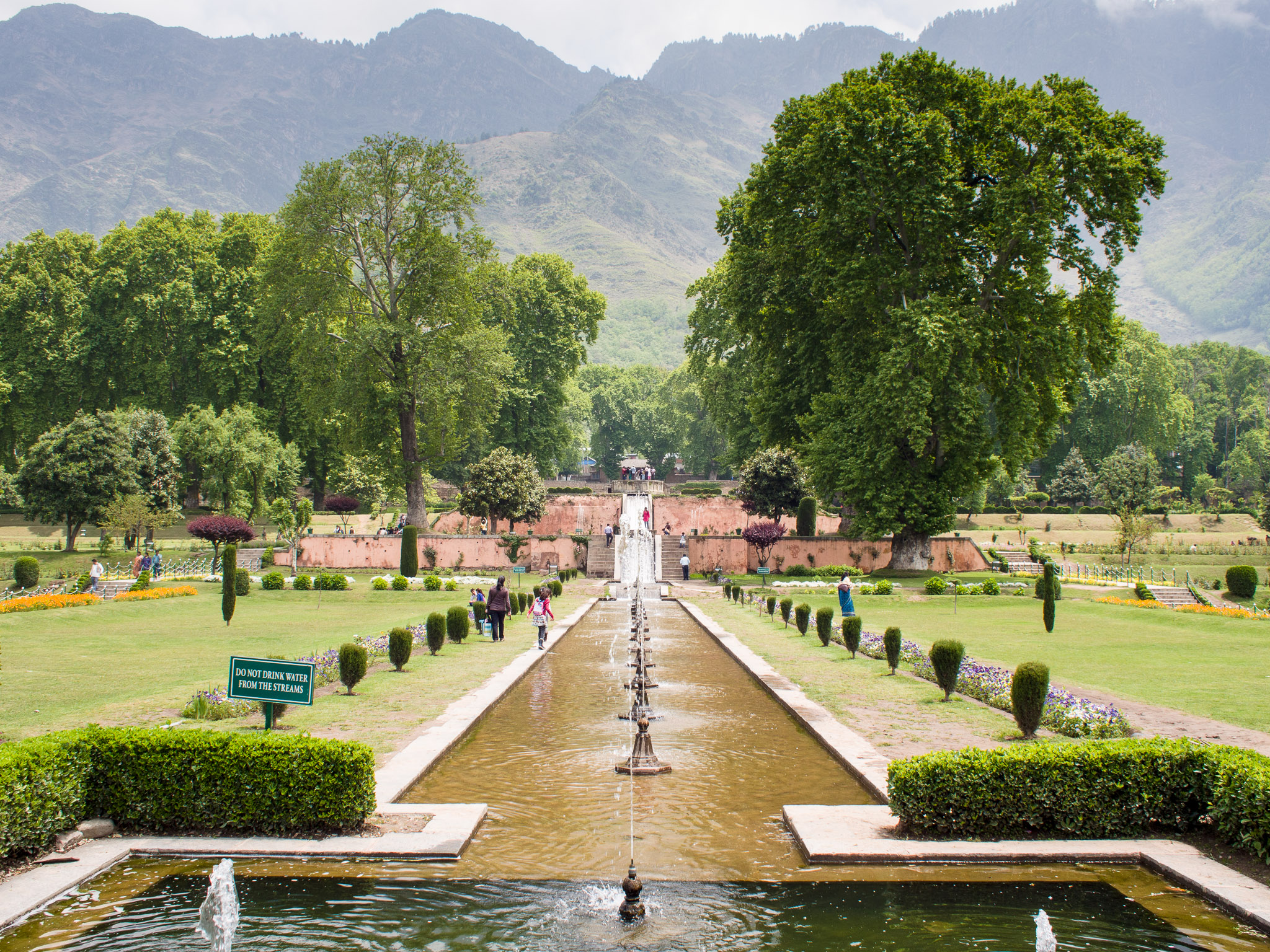
Nishat Bagh, Srinagar

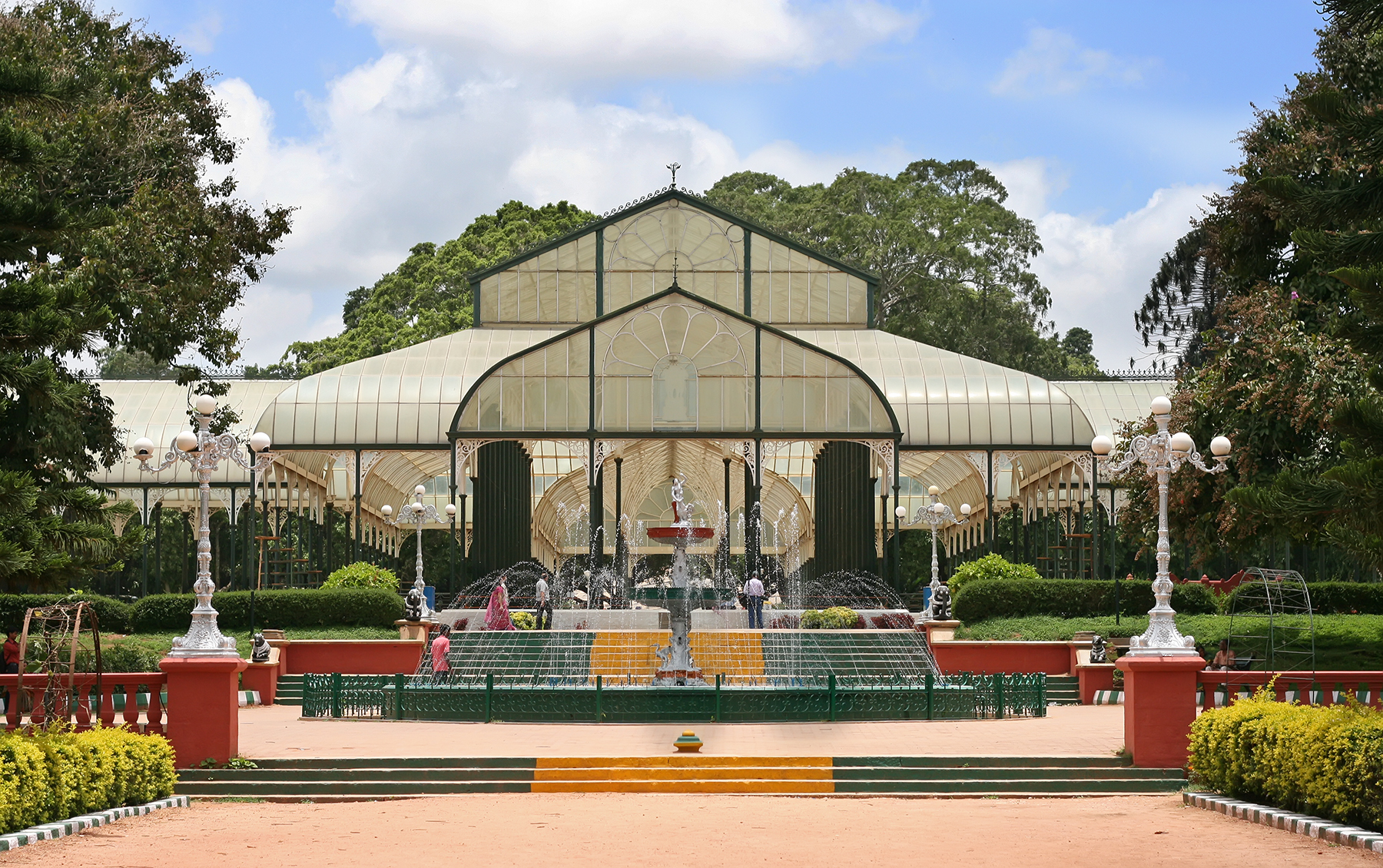
Lal Bagh, Bengaluru

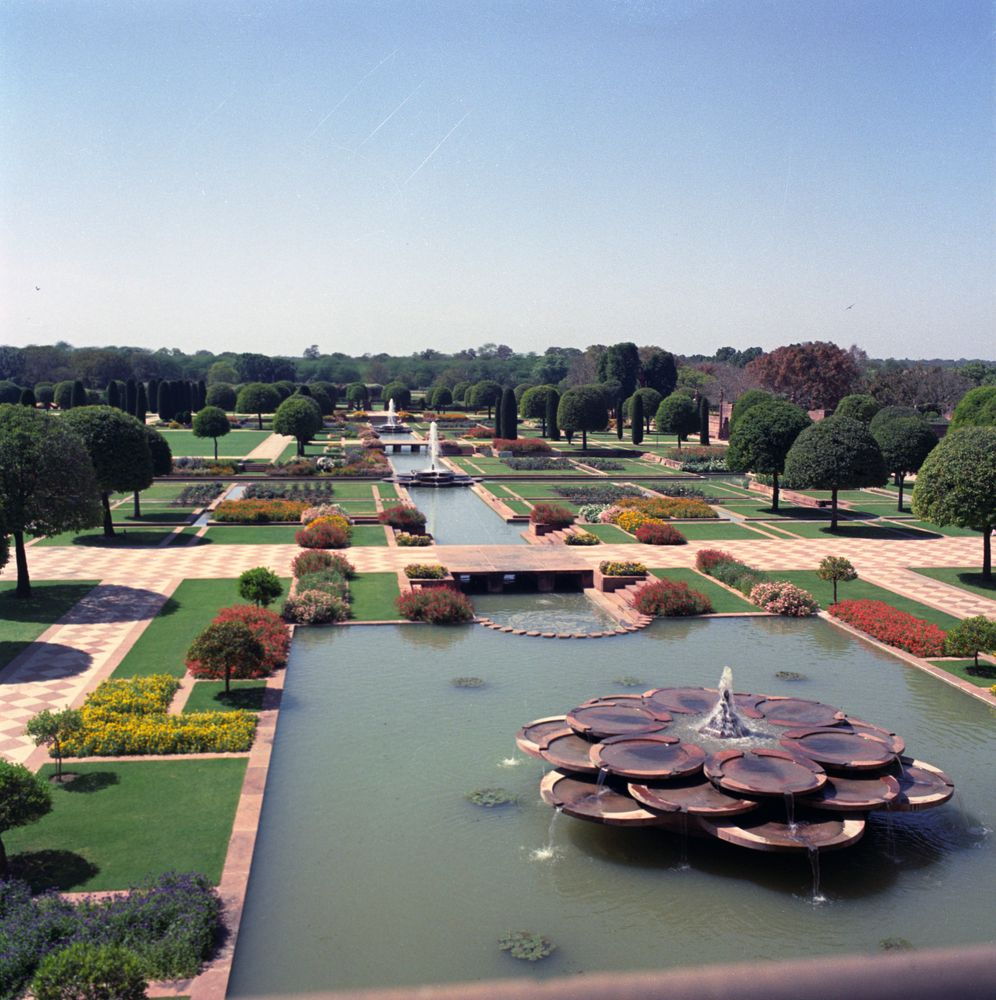
View of the Mughal Garden [Now Amrit udhyaan] of Rashtrapati Bhavan

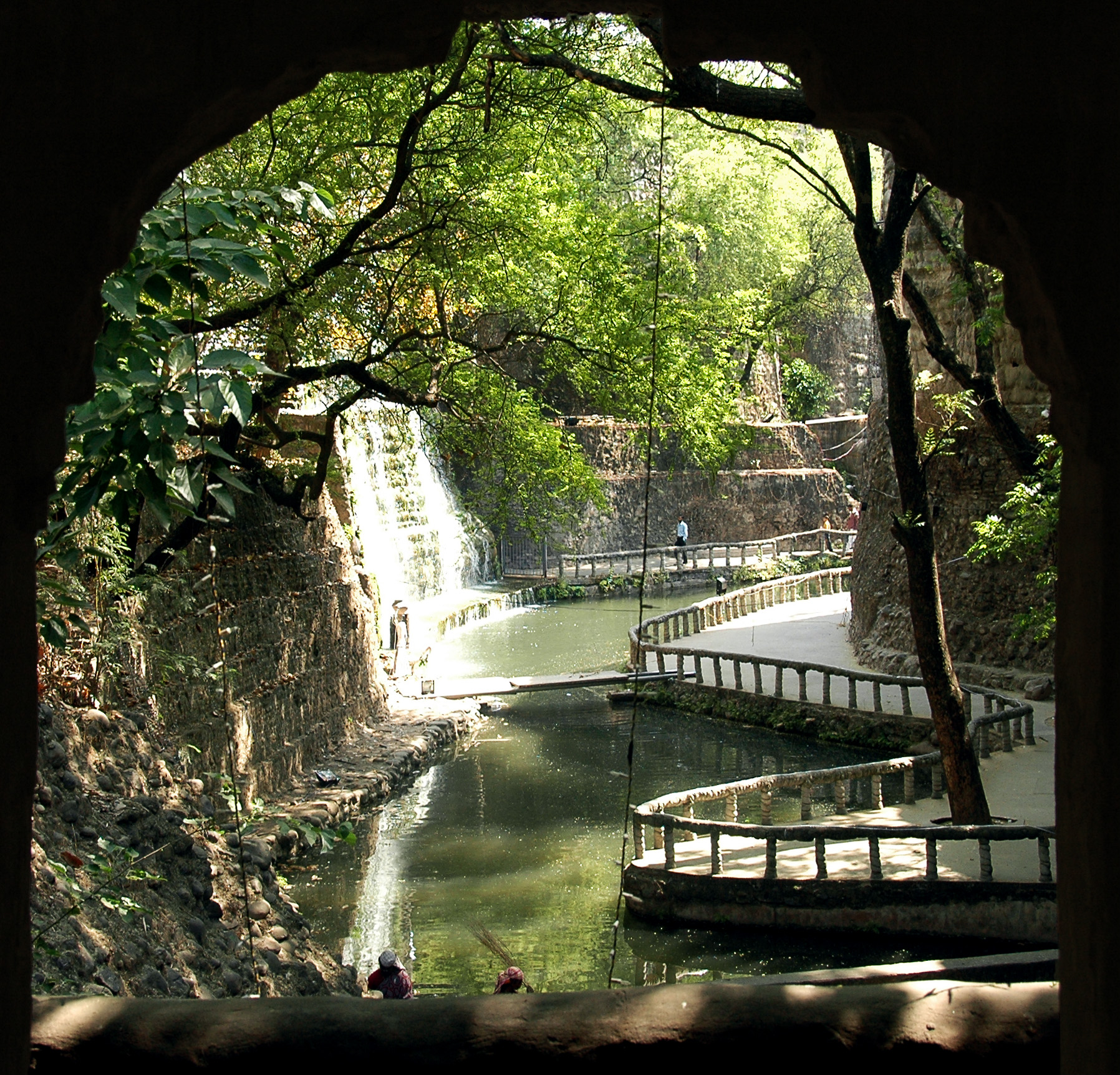
Waterfall at Rock Garden, Chandigarh

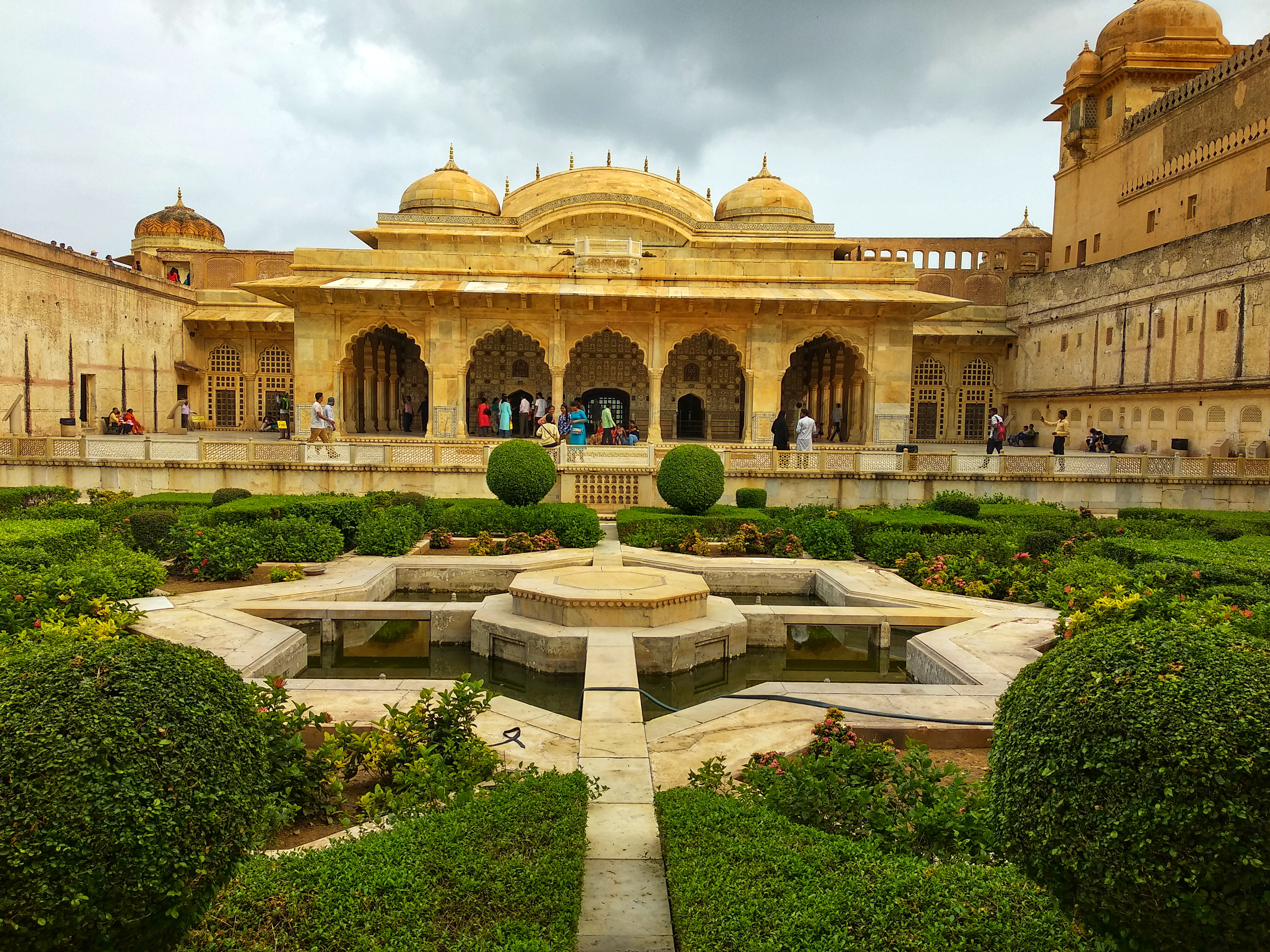
Char Bagh Garden, Rajasthan

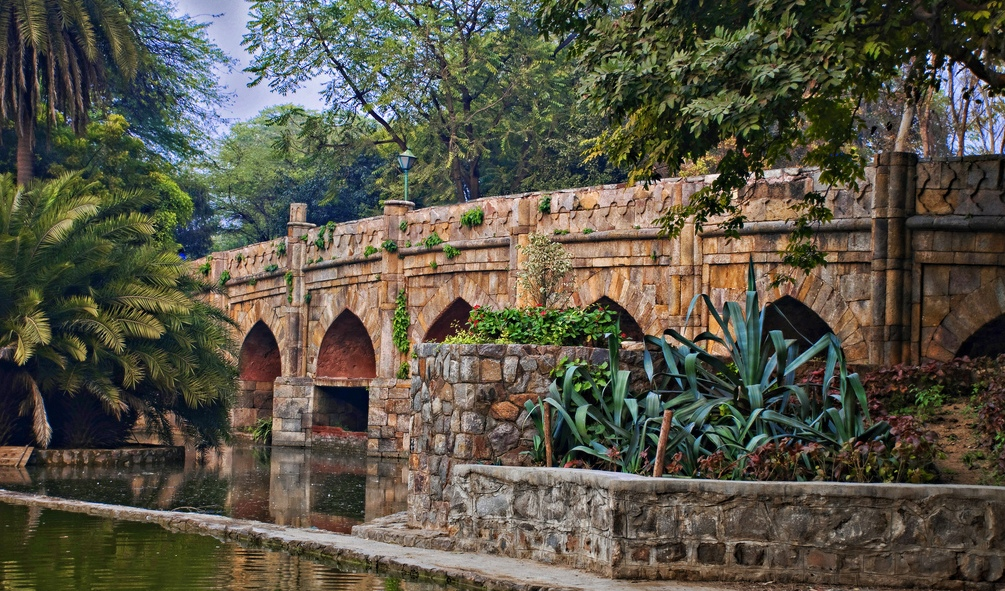
The Athpula (eight piers) bridge in Lodi gardens

== Arches ==
Indian architecture has utilized both false and true arches in its architecture, but structural arches have been essentially absent from Hindu temple architecture at all periods.

Arch styles in Indian Architecture

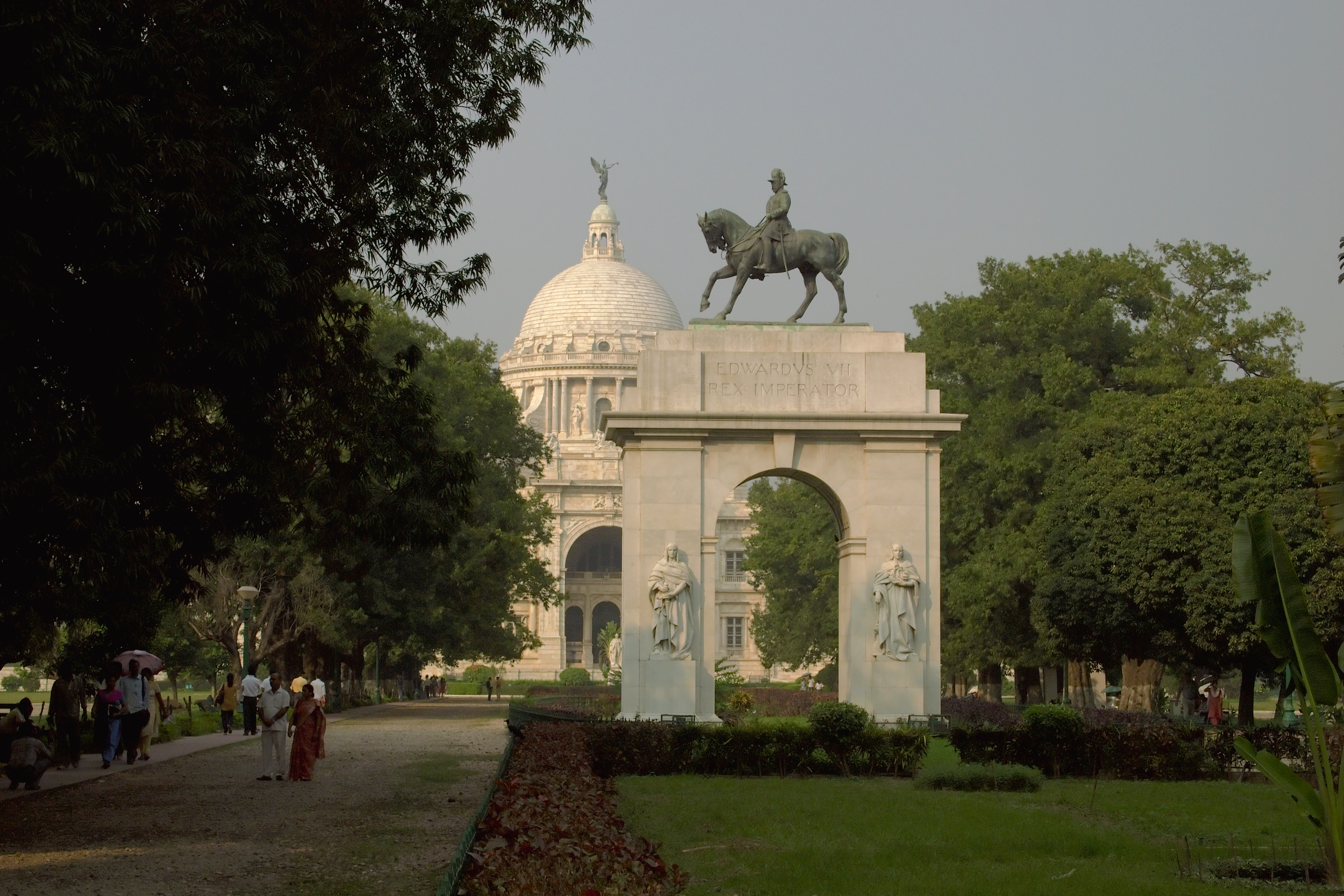
Dropped keystone, King Edward VII Arch, Victoria Memorial

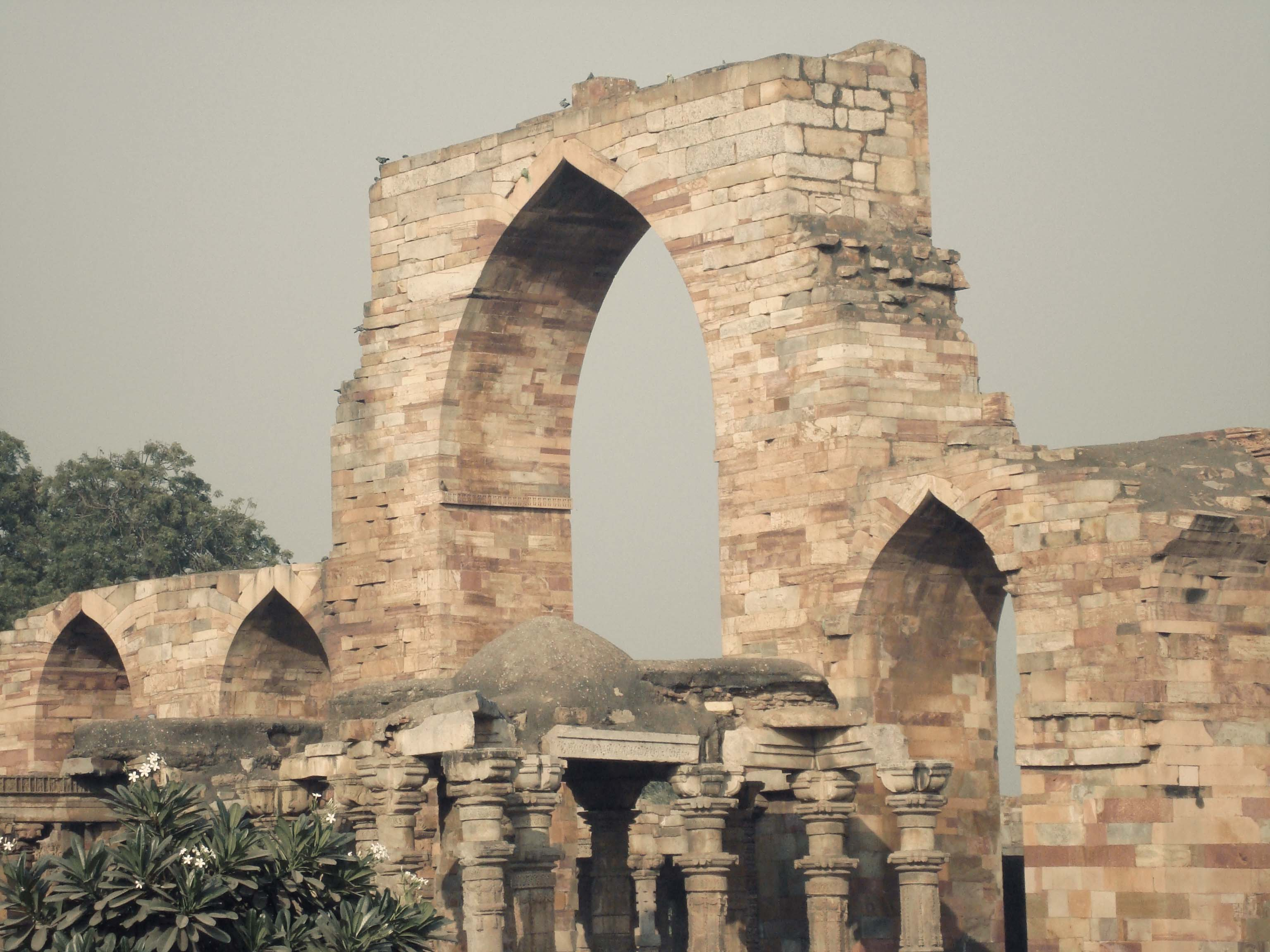
Corbel arches in Qutb Minar complex, Delhi

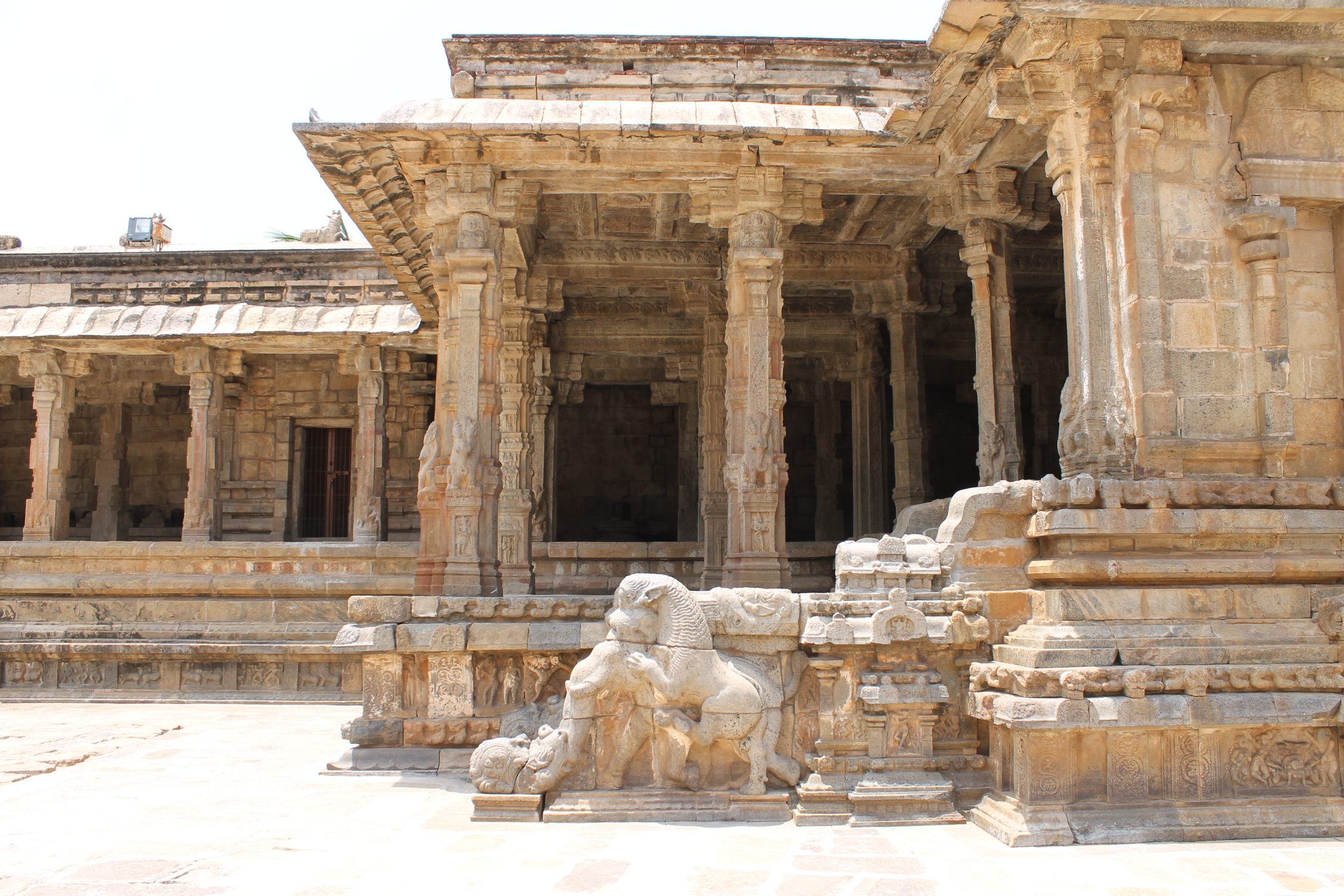
Post and lintel construction (Trabeate style) of Airavatesvara Temple, India

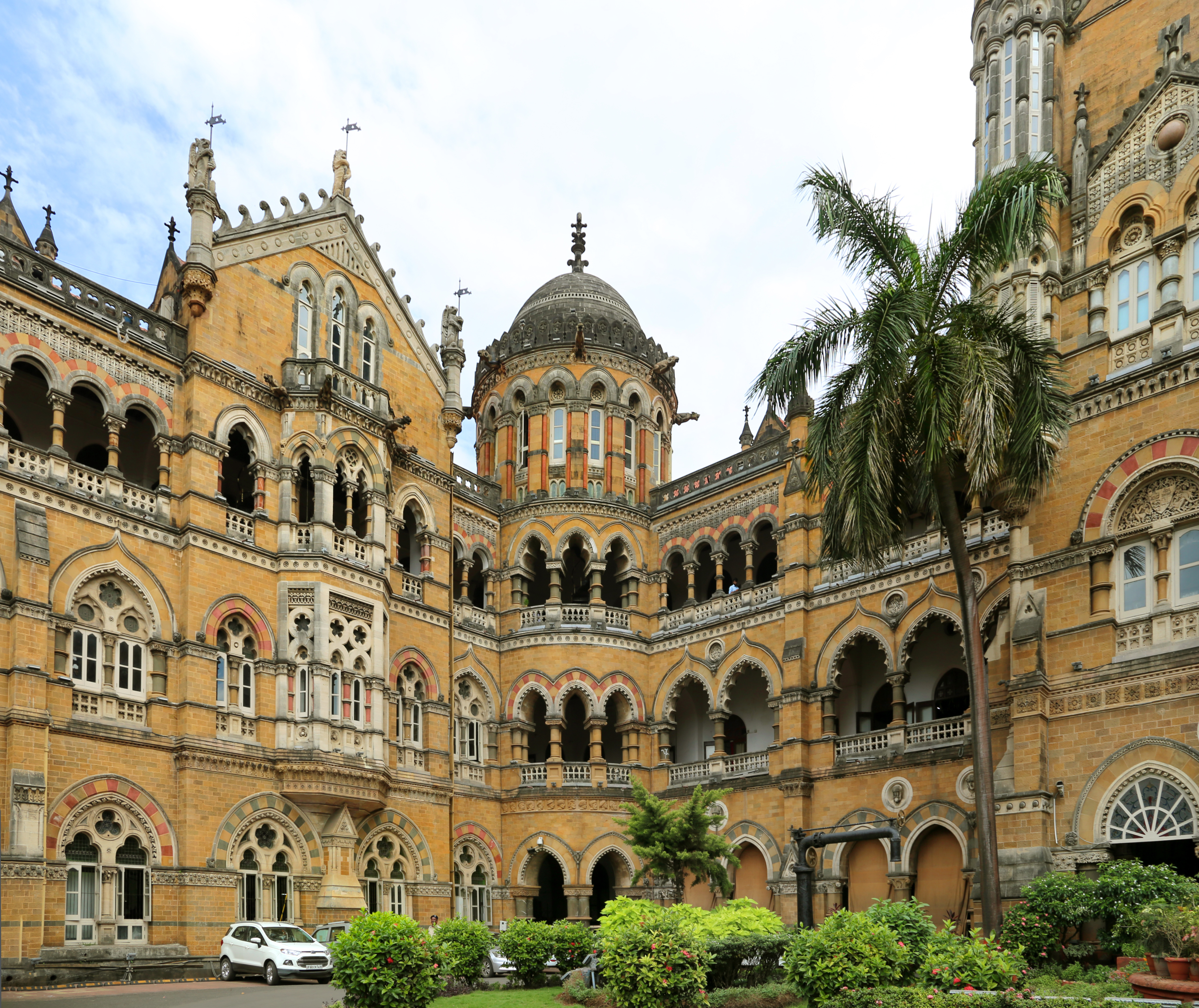
Victorian Gothic arches in Chhatrapati Shivaji Terminus, Mumbai

1, Dropped keystone, King Edward VII Arch, Victoria Memorial

=== Corbel arches ===
Corbel arches in India date from Indus Valley Civilisation which used the corbel arch to construct drains, as evidenced at Mohenjo daro, Harappa, and Dholavira.

The oldest arches surviving in Indian architecture are the gavaksha or "chaitya arches" found in ancient rock-cut architecture, and agreed to be copied from versions in wood which have all perished. These often terminate a whole ceiling with a semi-circular top; wooden roofs made in this way can be seen in carved depictions of cities and palaces. A number of small early constructed temples have such roofs, using corbelled construction, as well as an apsidal plan; the Trivikrama Temple at Ter, Maharashtra is an example. The arch shape survived into constructed Indian architecture, not as an opening in a wall but as a blind niche projection from a wall, that bears only its own weight. In this form it became a very common and important decorative motif on Hindu temples.

The "fundamental architectural principle of the constructed Hindu temple is always formulated in the trabeate order", that is to say using post and lintel systems with vertical and horizontal members. According to George Michell: "Never was the principle of the arch with radiating components, such as voussoirs and keystones, employed in Hindu structures, either in India or in other parts of Asia. It was not so much that Hindu architects were ignorant of these techniques, but rather that conformance to tradition and adherence to precedents were firm cultural attitudes". Harle describes the true arch as "not unknown, but almost never employed by Hindu builders", and its use as "rare, but widely dispersed".

Pointed arch, Mahabodhi temple, 6th–7th century CE, Late-Gupta period. Photo 1897.

=== True Arch ===
The 19th century archaeologist Alexander Cunningham, head of the Archaeological Survey of India, at first believed that due to the total absence of arches in Hindu temples, they were alien to Indian architecture, but several pre-Islamic examples bear testimony to their existence, as explained by him in the following manner:

Formerly it was the settled belief of all European enquirers that the ancient Hindus were ignorant of the Arch. This belief no doubt arose from the total absence of arches in any of the Hindu Temples. Thirty years ago I shared this belief with Mr. Fergusson, when I argued that the presence of arches in the great Buddhist Temple at Buddha Gaya proved that the building could not have been erected before the Muhammadan conquest. But during my late employment in the Archeological Survey of India several buildings of undoubted antiquity were discovered in which both vaults and arches formed part of the original construction.

— Alexander Cunningham, Mahâbodhi, or the great Buddhist temple under the Bodhi tree at Buddha-Gaya, 1892

Archaeological evidences indicate that wedge shaped bricks and construction of wells in the Indus valley civilization and although no true arches have been discovered as of yet, these bricks would have been suitable in the construction of true arches. True arch in India dates from the 5th century BCE during the Nanda period. Arch fragment discovered by archaeologist K. P. Jayaswal from an arch with Brahmi inscribed on it, or 1st - 2nd century CE when it first appeared in Kausambi palace architecture from Kushana period. Arches present at Vishnu temples at Deo Baranark, Amb and Kafir Kot temples from Hindu Shahi period and Hindu temple of Bhitargaon bear testimony to the use arches in the Hindu temple architecture.

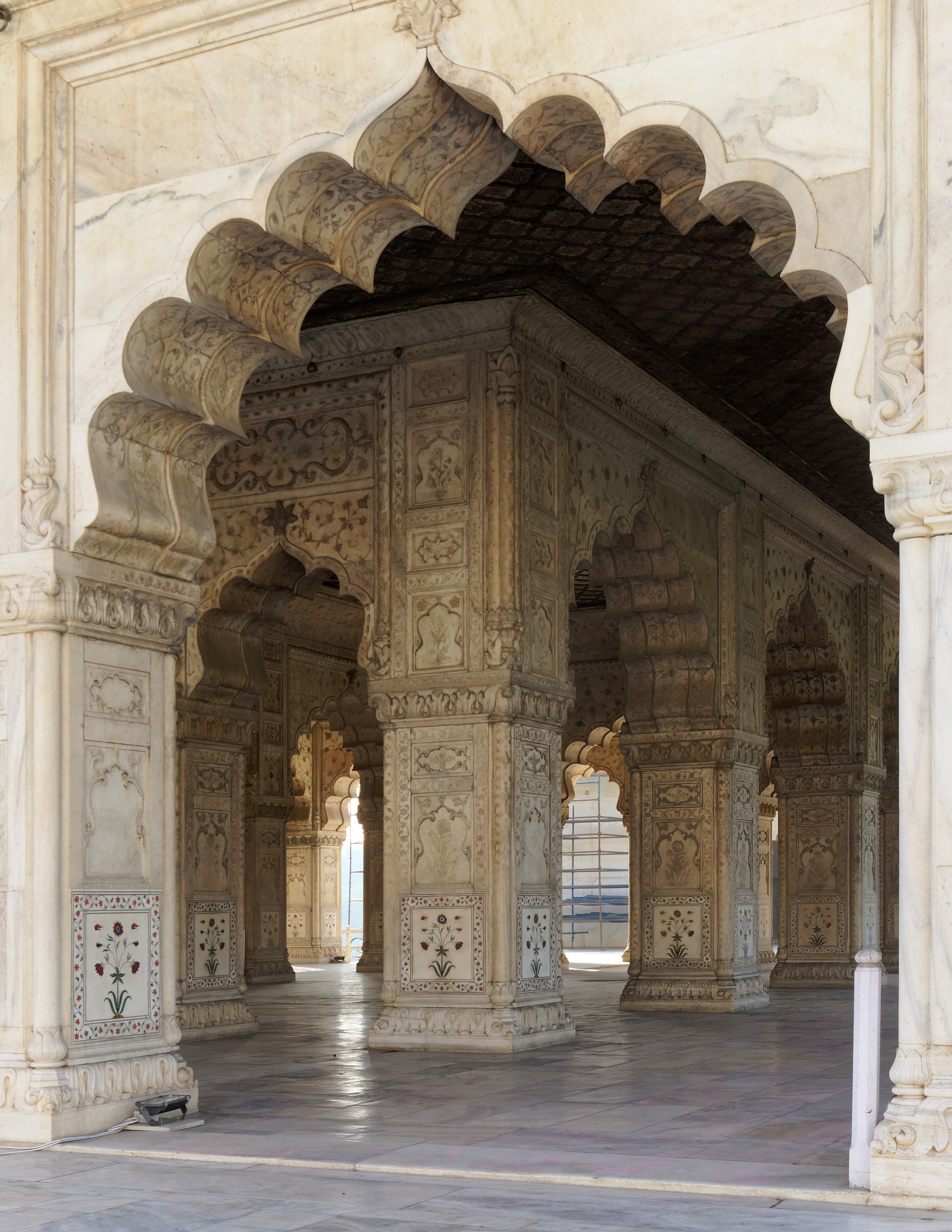
Arches of Diwan-i-Khas, Red Fort, Delhi

Although Alexander Cunningham has persisted in the notion that the Buddhist Mahabodhi Temple's pointed arch was added later during a Burmese restoration, given its predominant use in Islamic architecture, scholars such as Huu Phuoc Le have contested this assumption based on analysis that relieving arches could not have been added without destroying the entire temple structure, which is dated to 6th–7th century CE. Hence the pointed and relieving arches much have formed part of the original building dating from the pre-Islamic periods in proper. Moreover, pointed arches vaulted entrances have been noted in Bhitargaon temple and Kausambi Palace architecture as well.

=== Trabeate style ===
Trabeate style is one of the main style of architecture of that time

- Lintel use in this style.
- shikar also prevail in this.
- No use of minar.
- Material sand stone.

=== Arcuate style ===
Arcuate style is also one of the main style for architecture.

- In this lintel is replaced by arch.
- There is also use of dome.
- Concept of minar is also there.
- Material, brick, lime and mortar used for making of dome (Wood was primarily not used because of the geography).

=== Torana ===
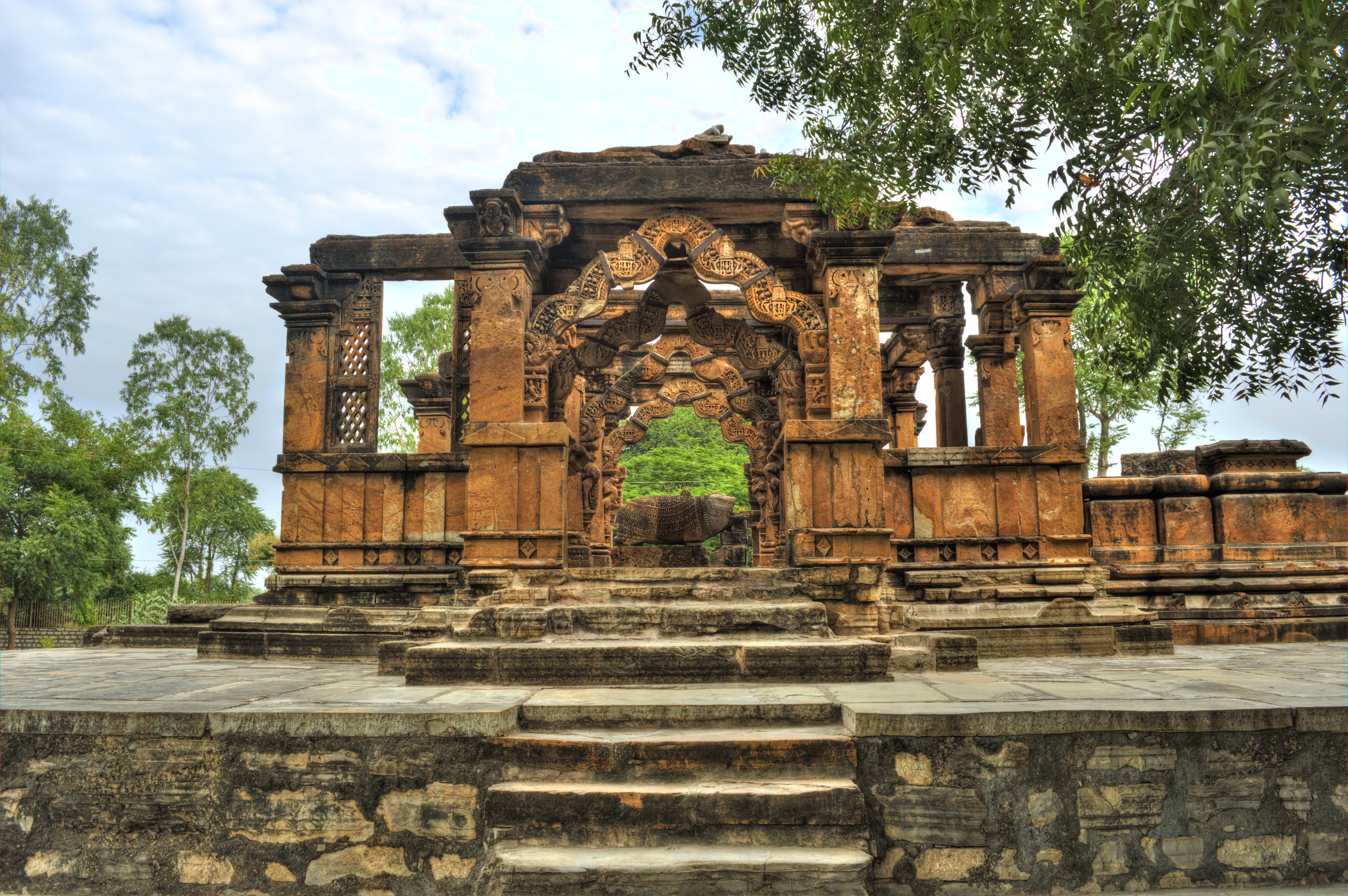
Nav Toran Temple, Neemuch, Madhya Pradesh

A torana, or vandanamalikas, is a free-standing ornamental or arched gateway for ceremonial purposes seen in the Hindu, Buddhist and Jain architecture of the subcontinent, Southeast Asia and parts of East Asia. Chinese paifang gateways, Japanese torii gateways, Korean Hongsalmun gateways, and Thai Sao Ching Cha were derived from the Indian torana.

The torana is considered sacred and honorific gateway in Hindu and Buddhist religious sites. It is built with a projecting cross-piece resting on two uprights or posts. Mostly made of wood or stone, and the cross-piece is generally of three bars placed one on the top of the other; both cross-piece and posts are usually sculpted.

Toranas are associated with Buddhist stupas like the Great Stupa of Sanchi, as well as with Jain and Hindu structures, and also with several secular structures. Symbolic toranas can also be made of flowers and even leaves and hung over the doors and at entrances, particularly in Western and Southern India. They are believed to bring good fortune and signify auspicious and festive occasions. They can also serve didactic and narrative purposes or be erected to mark the victory of a king.

During the Vesak festival of Sri Lanka, it is a tradition to erect electrically illuminated colorful Vesak toranas in public places. These decorations are temporary installations which remain in public display for couple of weeks starting from the day of Vesak.

Hindu, Buddhist and Jain toranas
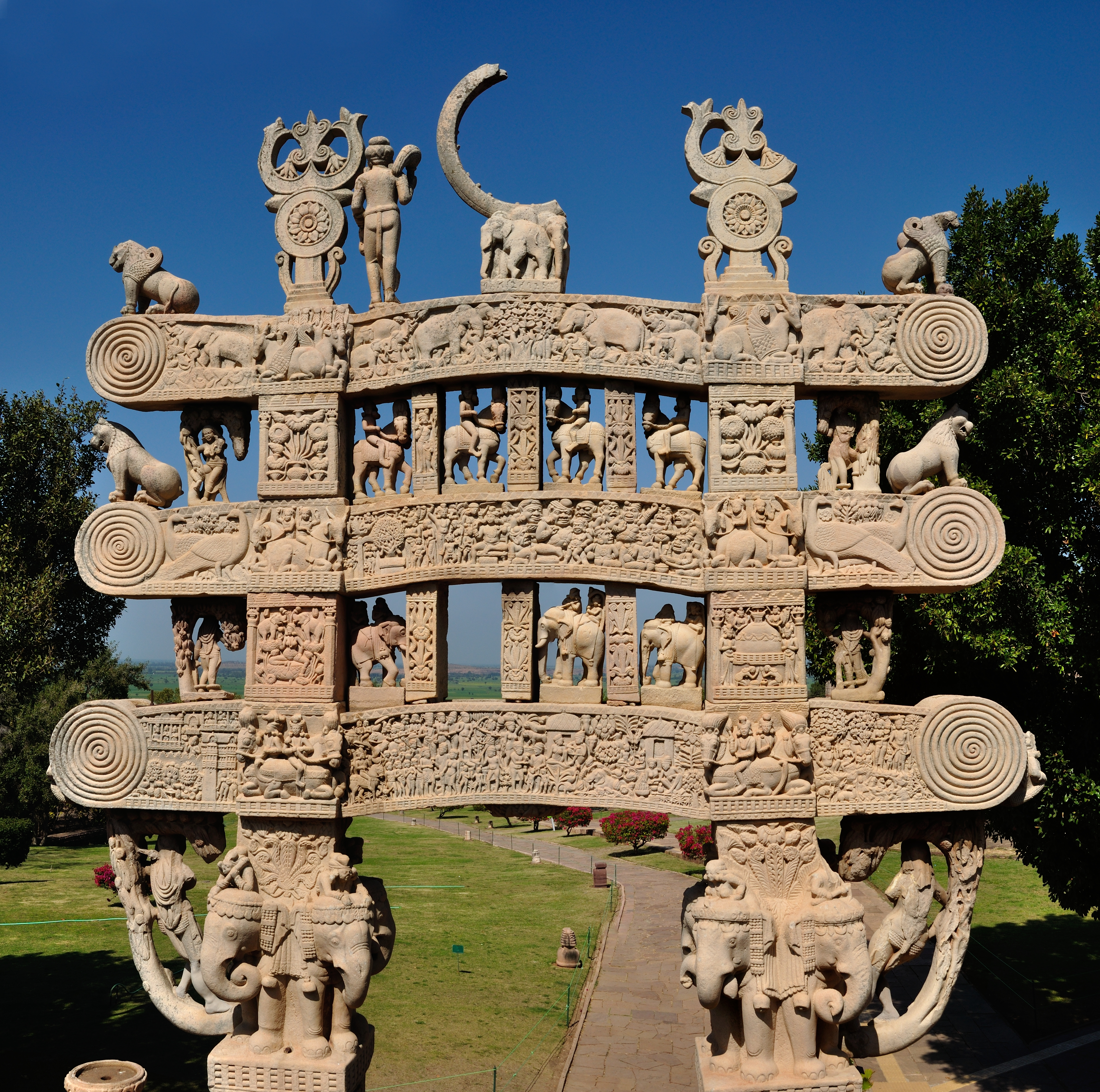
Rear side of North Torana of Stupa-1 at Sanchi Hill, 3rd century BCE to 1st century BCE, India

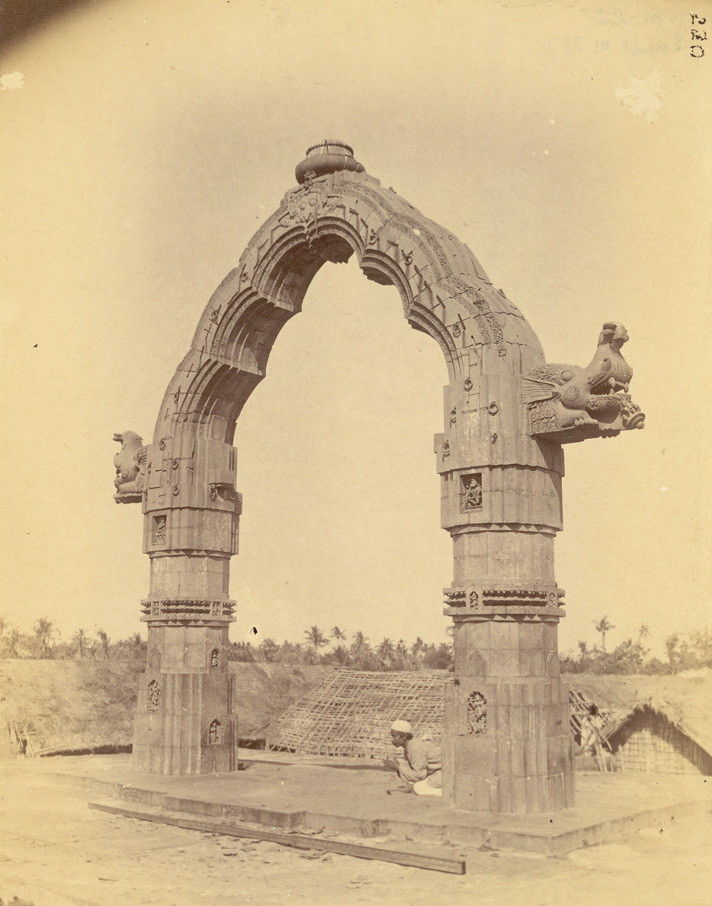
A photo of Torana taken in 1890 of 10th century Jagannath Temple, Puri, India

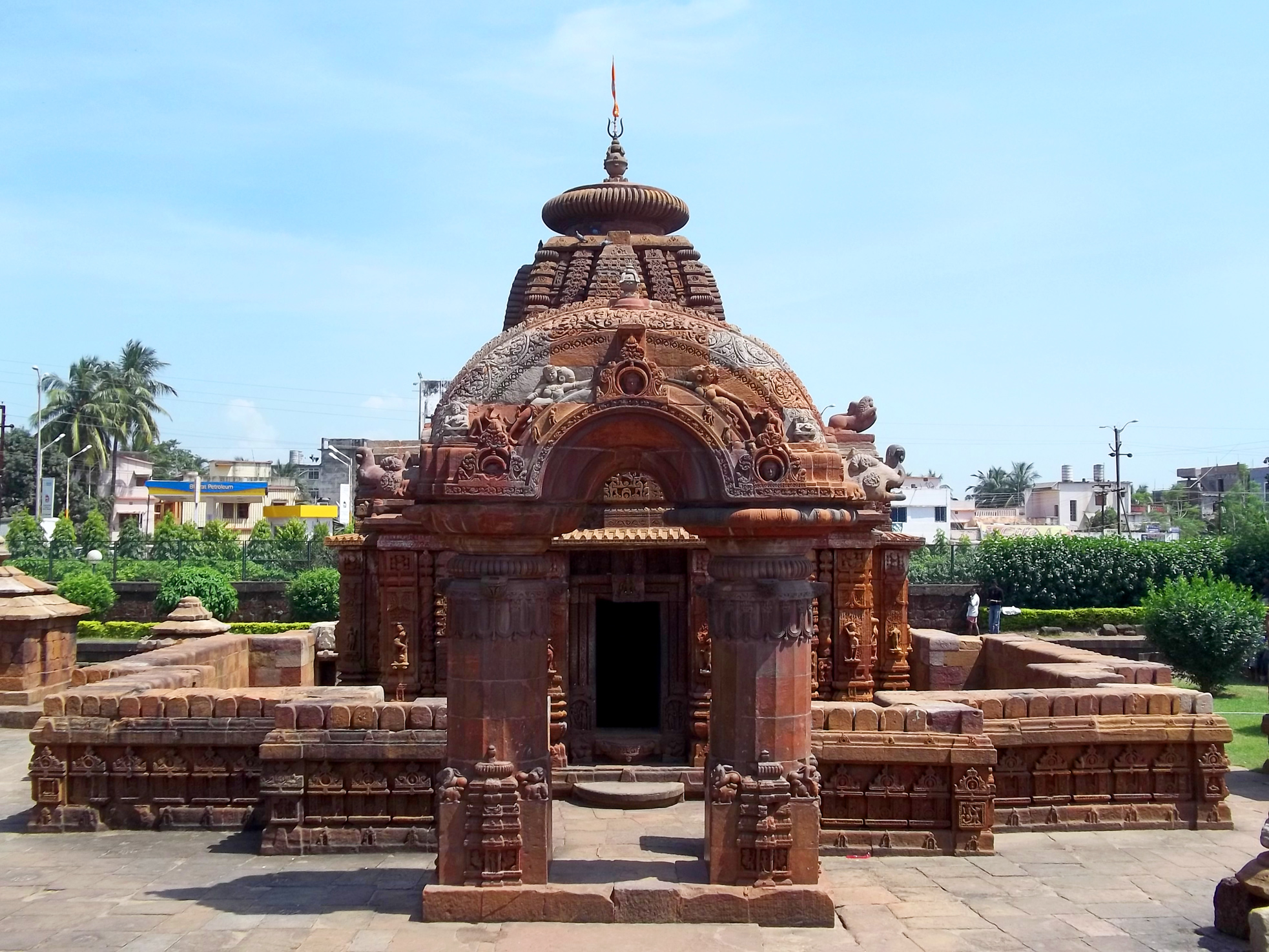
Torana of the 10th century Muktesvara deula, India.

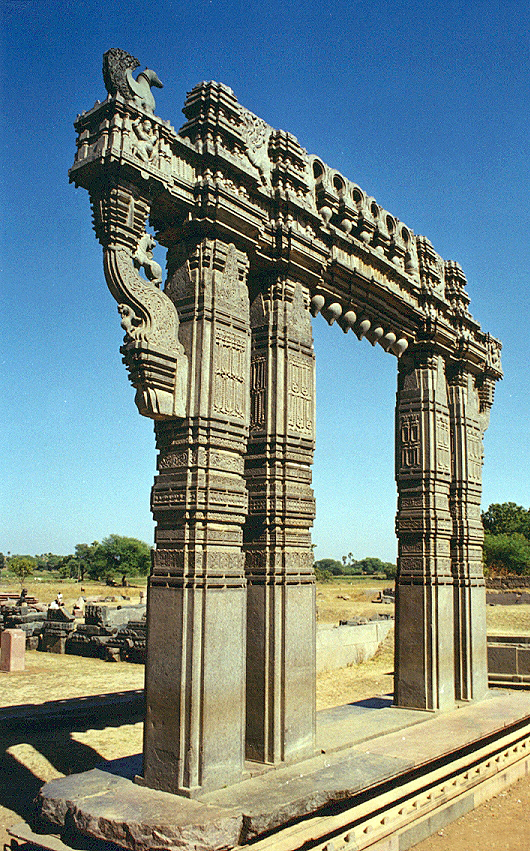
Torana from the 12th century Kakatiya dynasty, at Warangal Fort, India

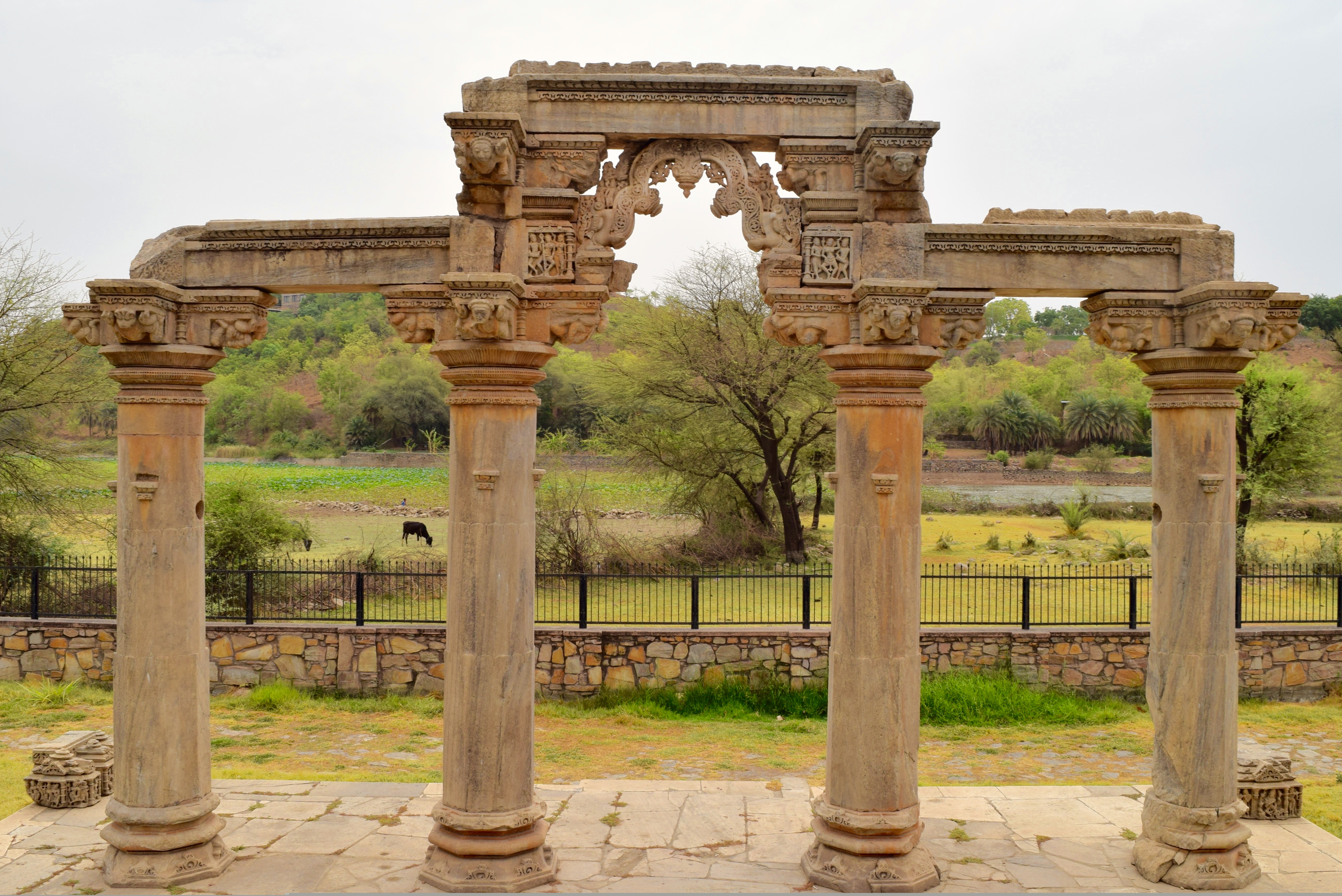
Torana in Sas-Bahu Temple, Udaipur

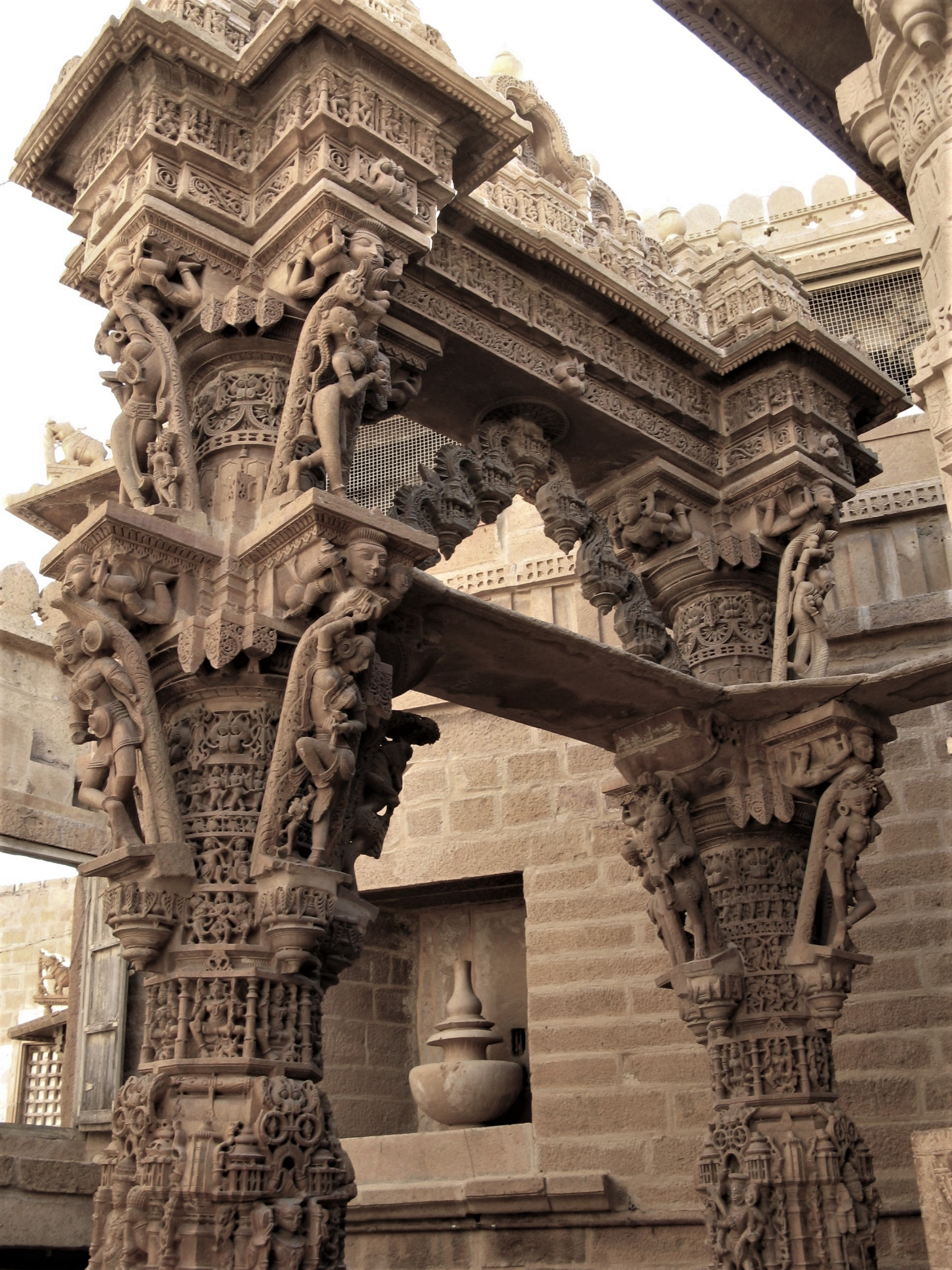
12th century Torana at Parshvanatha temple, Jaisalmer Fort

=== Gavaksha ===
The gavaksha (or chandrashala) is a motif centred on an ogee, circular or horseshoe arch that decorates many examples of Indian rock-cut architecture and later Indian structural temples and other buildings. It is called a chaitya arch when used on the facade of a chaitya hall, around the single large window. In later forms it develops well beyond this type, and becomes a very flexible unit. Gavāksha is a Sanskrit word which means "bulls or cows eye". In Hindu temples, their role is envisioned as symbolically radiating the light and splendour of the central icon in its sanctum. Alternatively, they are described as providing a window for the deity to gaze out into the world. Like the whole of the classic chaitya, the form originated in the shape of the wooden thatched roofs of buildings, none of which have survived; the earliest version replicating such roofs in stone is at the entrance to the non-Buddhist Lomas Rishi Cave, one of the man-made Barabar Caves in Bihar.

== Legacy on neighbouring Asian countries ==
Influence on Southeast Asia

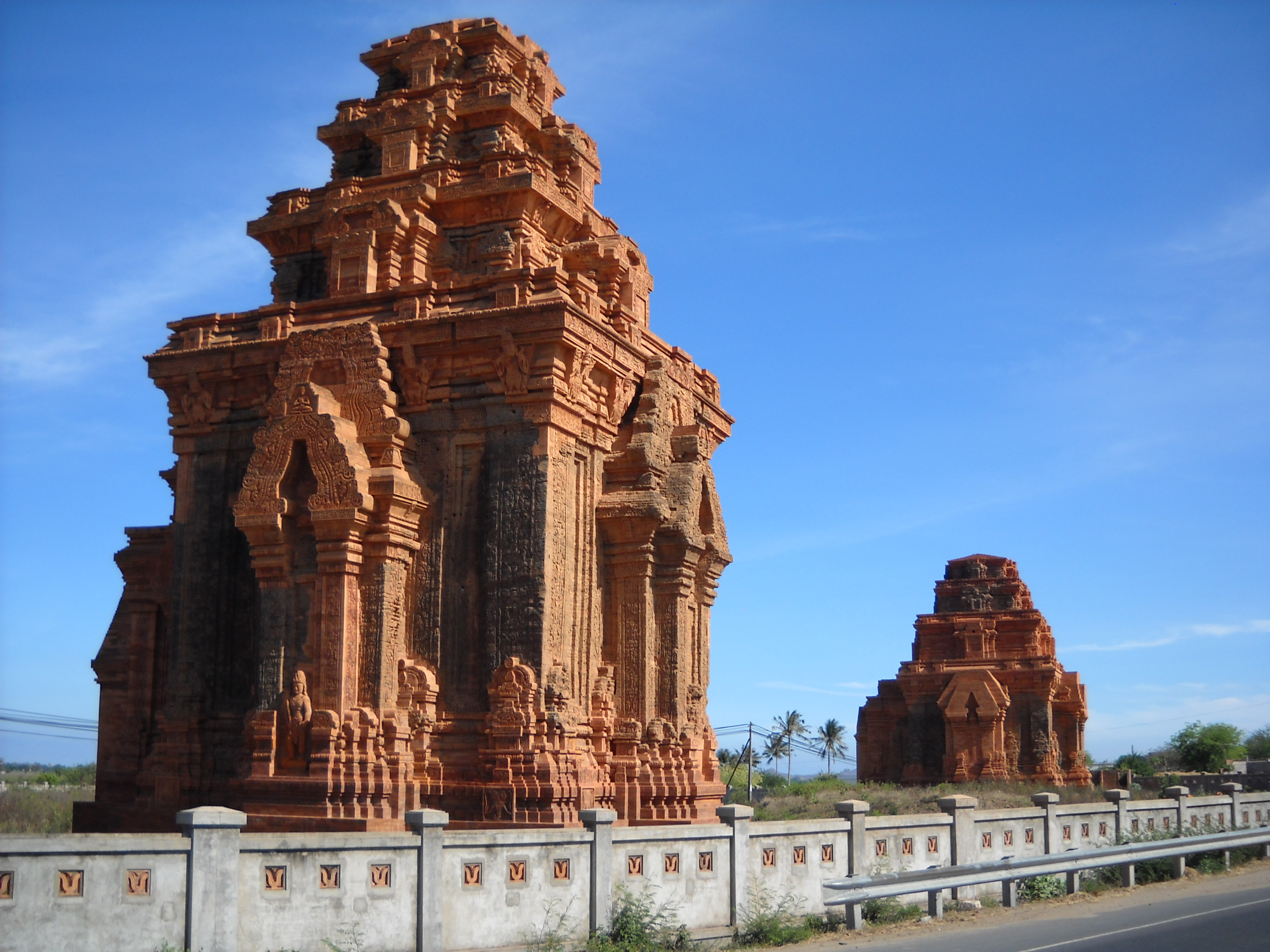
Hòa Lai Towers in Ninh Thuận province, Vietnam

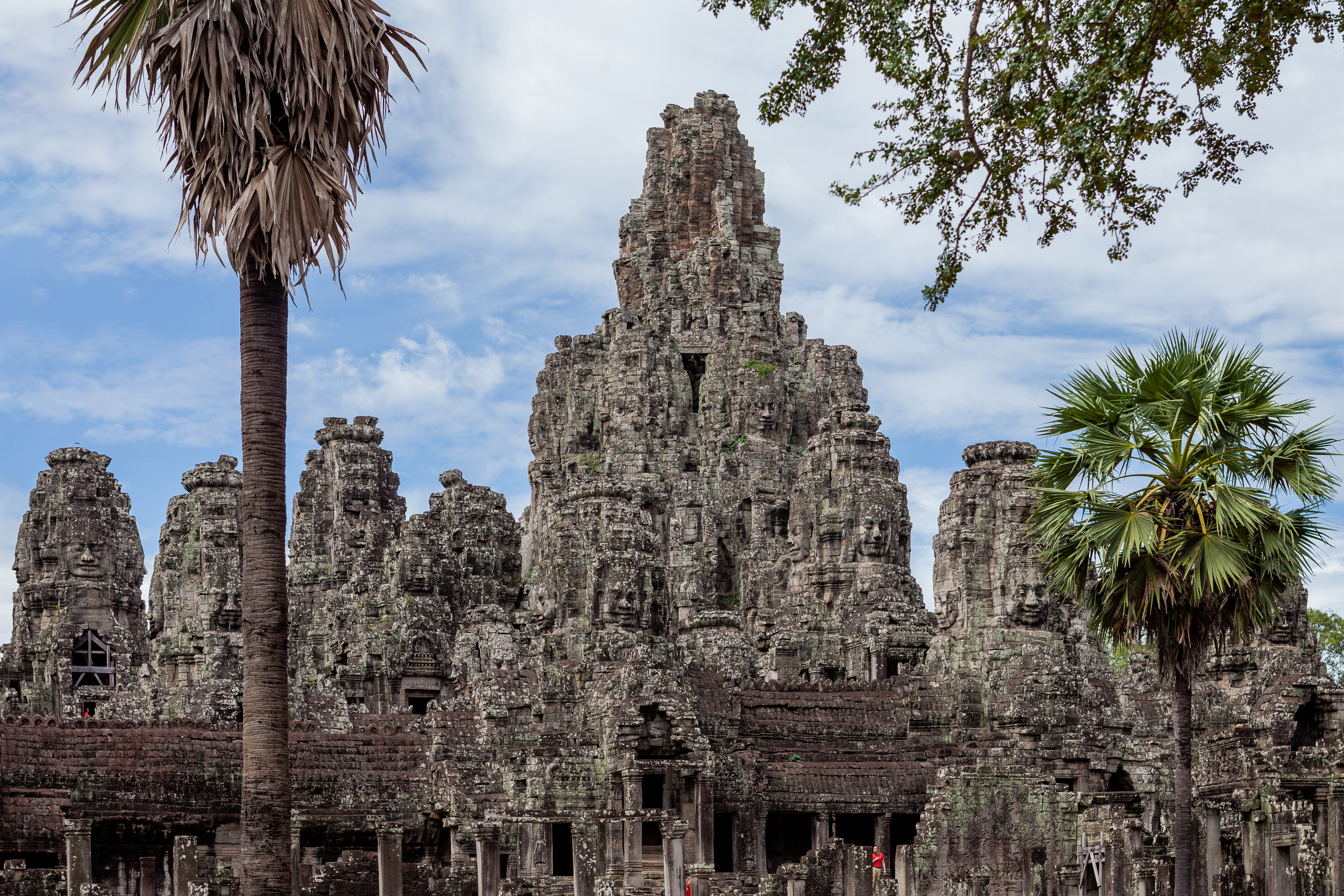
Prasat Bayon (Jayagiri Brahma Palace), Cambodia

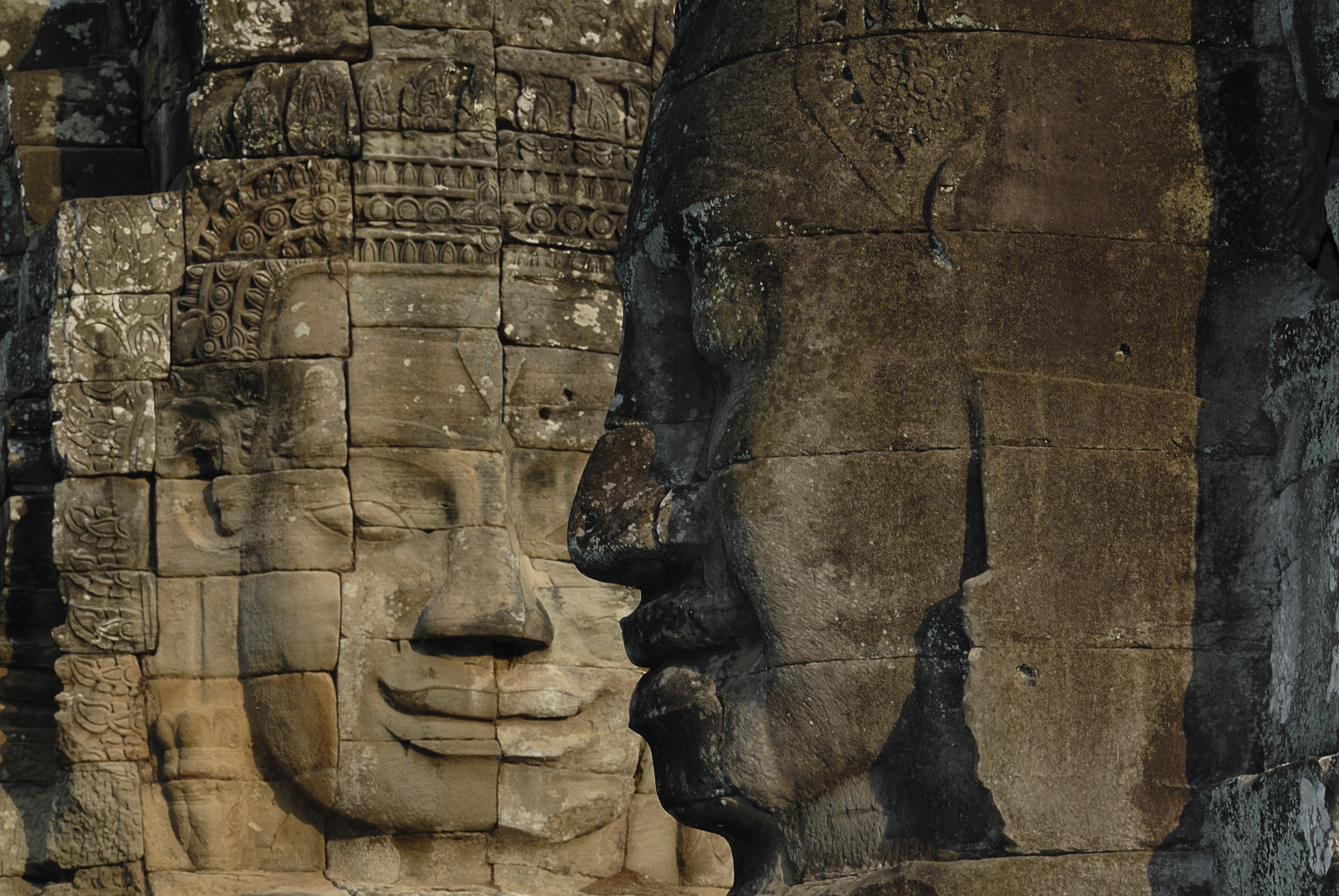
"The serenity of the stone faces" occupying many towers, Bayon, Cambodia

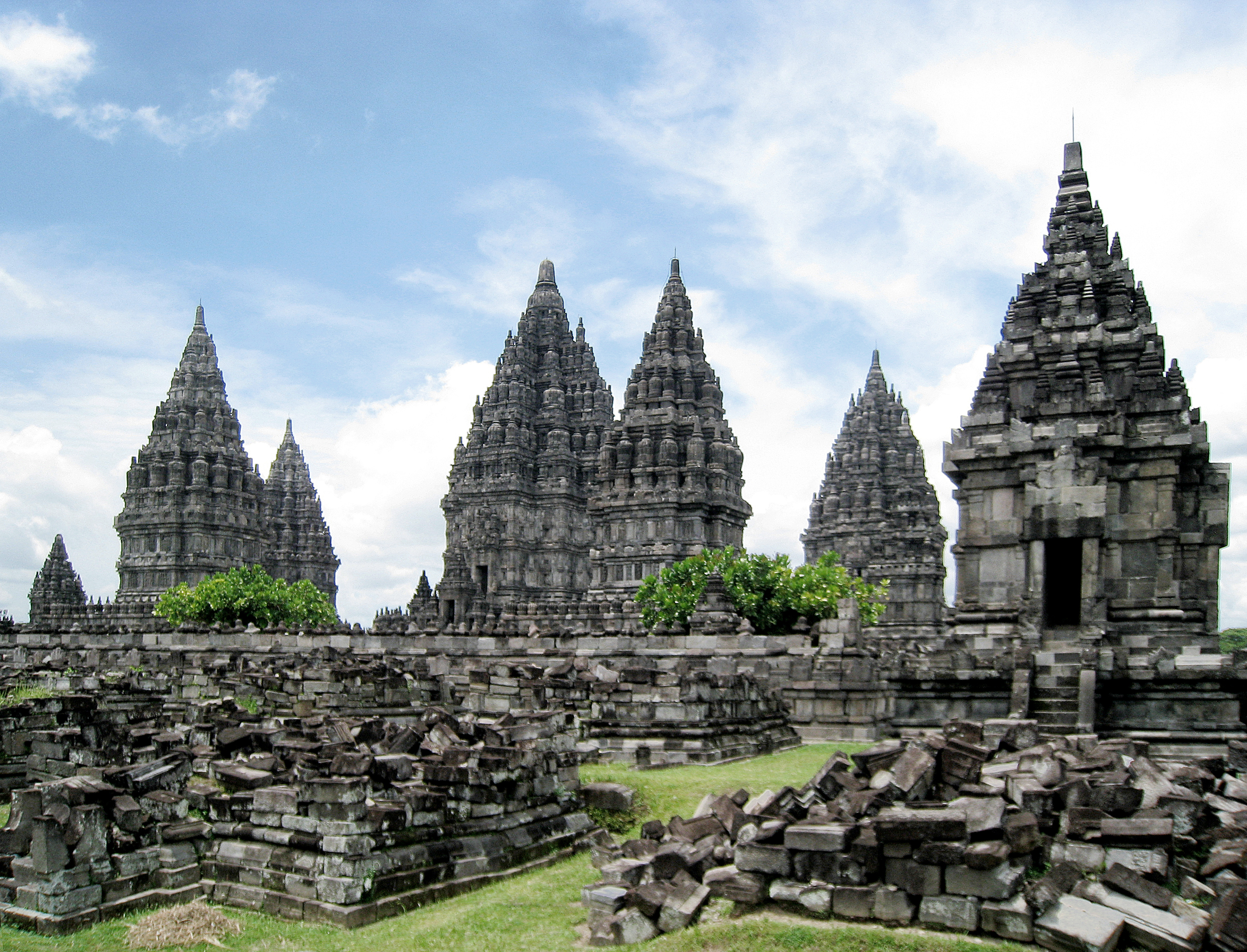
Trimurti Prambanan temple, Yogyakarta, Indonesia

To know Indian art in India alone is to know but half its story. To apprehend it to the full, we must follow it in the wake of Buddhism, to central Asia, China, and Japan; we much watch it assuming new forms and breaking new forms and breaking into new beauties as it spreads over Tibet and Burma, and Siam; we must gaze in awe at the unexampled grandeur of its creations in Cambodia and Java. In each of these countries, Indian art encounters a different racial genius, a different local environment, and under their modifying influence it takes on a different garb.

— Sir John Marshall, Director-General of the Archaeological Survey of India

=== Influence on Southeast Asia ===
Southeast Asia was under the Indian sphere of cultural influence starting around 290 BC until around the 15th century, when Hindu-Buddhist influence was absorbed by local politics. Kingdoms in the southeast coast of the Indian subcontinent had established trade, cultural and political relations with Southeast Asian kingdoms in Myanmar, Thailand, Indonesia, Malay Peninsula, Philippines, Cambodia and Champa. This led to Indianisation and Sanskritisation of Southeast Asia within Indosphere, Southeast Asian polities were the Indianised Hindu-Buddhist Mandala.

==== Vietnam ====
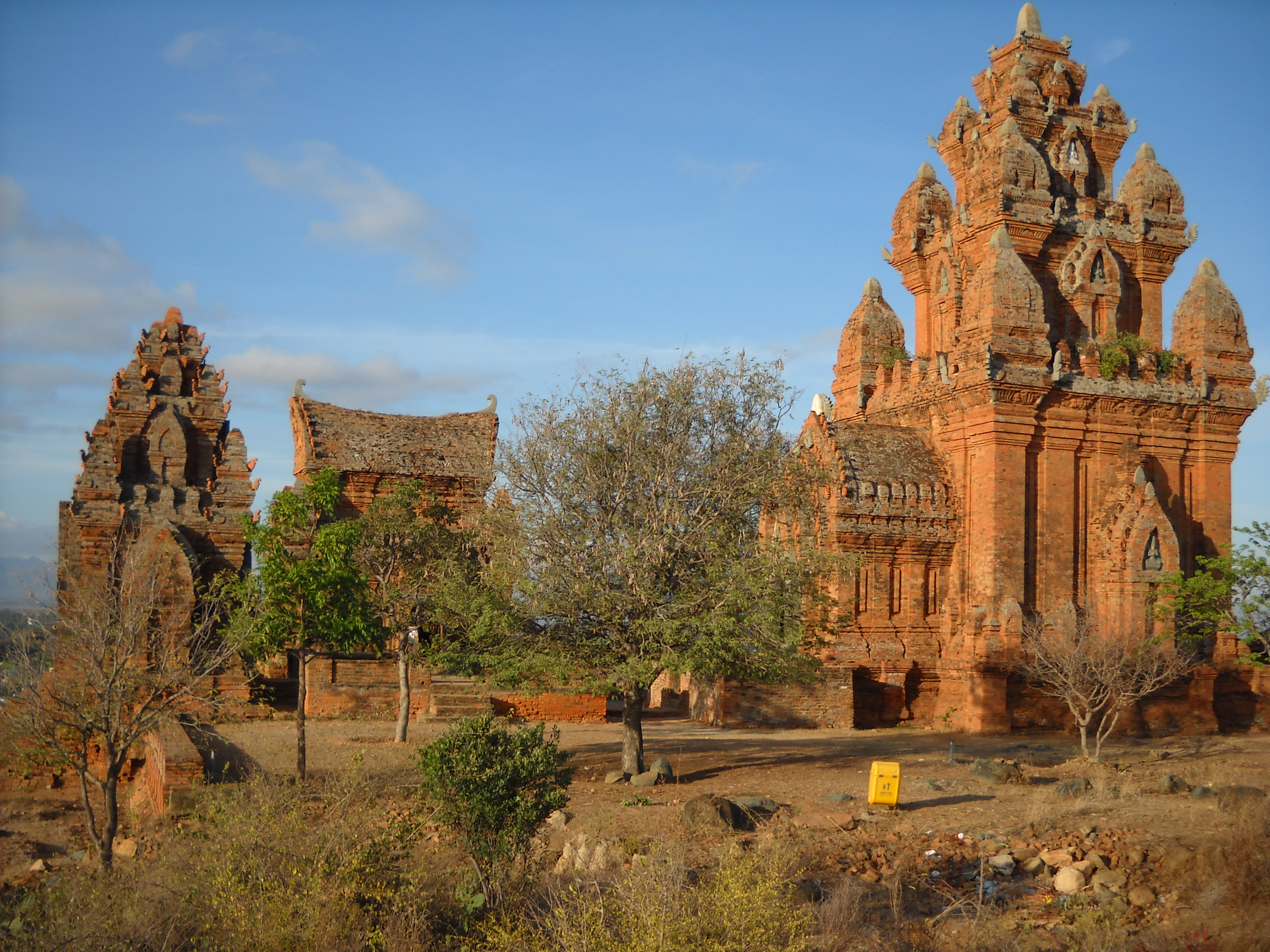
Po Klong Garai Temple near Phan Rang

The profile of the 13th-century Po Klong Garai Temple near Phan Rang includes all the buildings typical of a Cham temple. From left to right one can see the gopura, the saddle-shaped kosagrha, and mandapa attached to the kalan tower.

Between the 6th and the 16th century, the Kingdom of Champa flourished in present-day central and southern Vietnam. Unlike the Javanese that mostly used volcanic andesite stone for their temples, and Khmer of Angkor which mostly employed grey sandstones to construct their religious buildings, the Cham built their temples from reddish bricks. The most important remaining sites of Cham bricks temple architecture include Mỹ Sơn near Da Nang, Po Nagar near Nha Trang, and Po Klong Garai near Phan Rang.

Typically, a Cham temple complex consisted of several different kinds of buildings. They are kalan, a brick sanctuary, typically in the form of a tower with garbahgriha used to host the murti of deity. A mandapa is an entry hallway connected with a sanctuary. A kosagrha or "fire-house" is a temple construction typically with a saddle-shaped roof, used to house the valuables belonging to the deity or to cook for the deity. The gopura was a gate-tower leading into a walled temple complex. These building types are typical for Hindu temples in general; the classification is valid not only for the architecture of Champa, but also for other architectural traditions of Greater India.

==== Indonesia ====
Prambanan, an example of Indonesian temple architecture
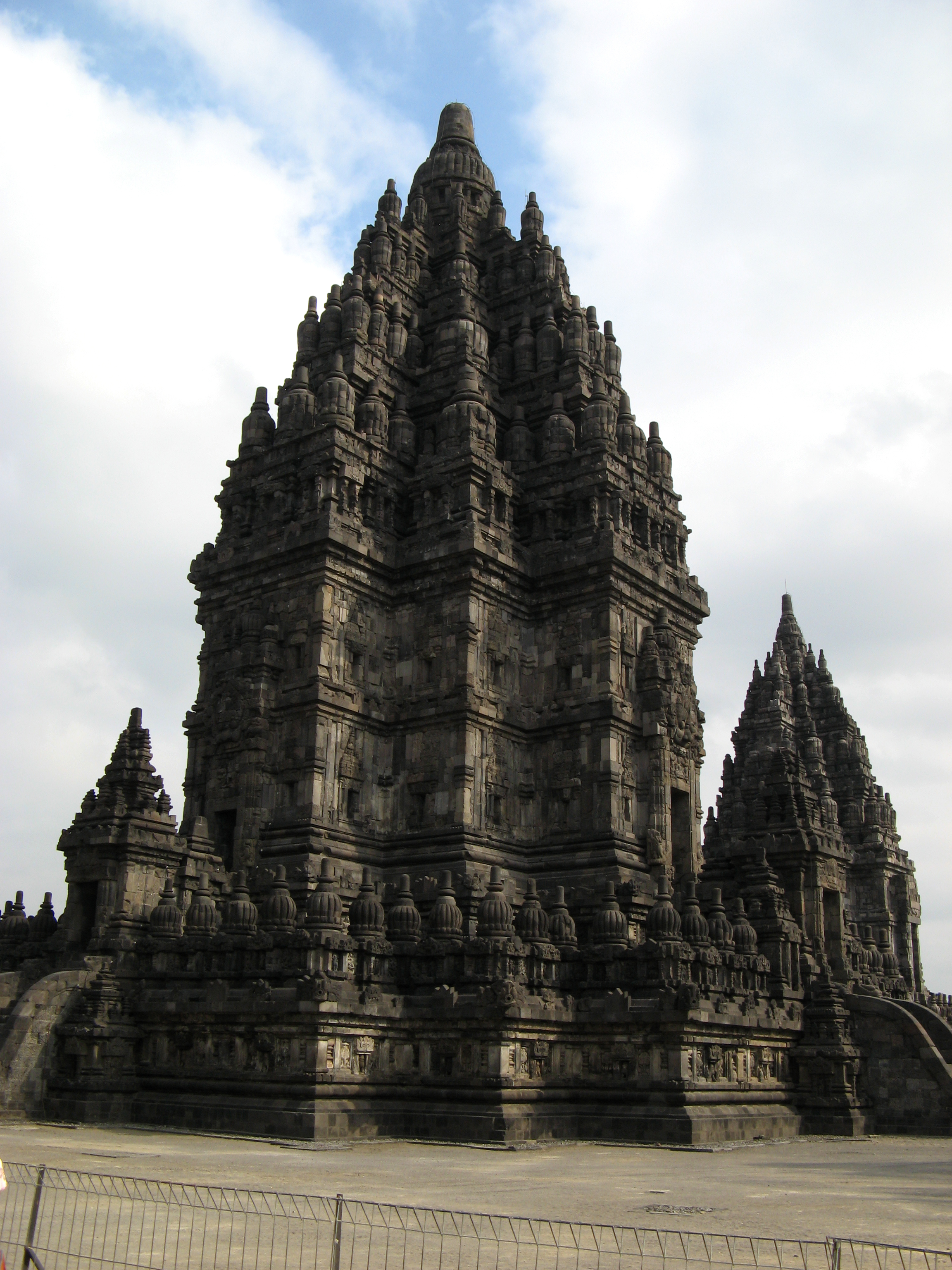
Prambanan temple (Shivagrha) of Central Java, an example of the 9th century Indonesian Javanese Hindu temple architecture with mandala layout and prasad tower crowned with stylized ratna-vajra.

Temples are called candi (pronounced [tʃandi]) in Indonesia, whether it is Buddhist or Hindu. A candi refers to a structure based on the Indian type of single-celled shrine, with a pyramidal tower above it (Meru tower in Bali), and a portico for entrance, mostly built between the 7th to 15th centuries. In Hindu Balinese architecture, a candi shrine can be found within a pura compound. The best example of Indonesian Javanese Hindu temple architecture is the 9th century Prambanan (Shivagrha) temple compound, located in Central Java, near Yogyakarta. This largest Hindu temple in Indonesia has three main prasad towers, dedicated to Trimurti gods. Shiva temple, the largest main temple is towering to 47 metre-high (154 ft). The term "candi" itself is believed was derived from Candika, one of the manifestations of the goddess Durga as the goddess of death.

==== Cambodia ====
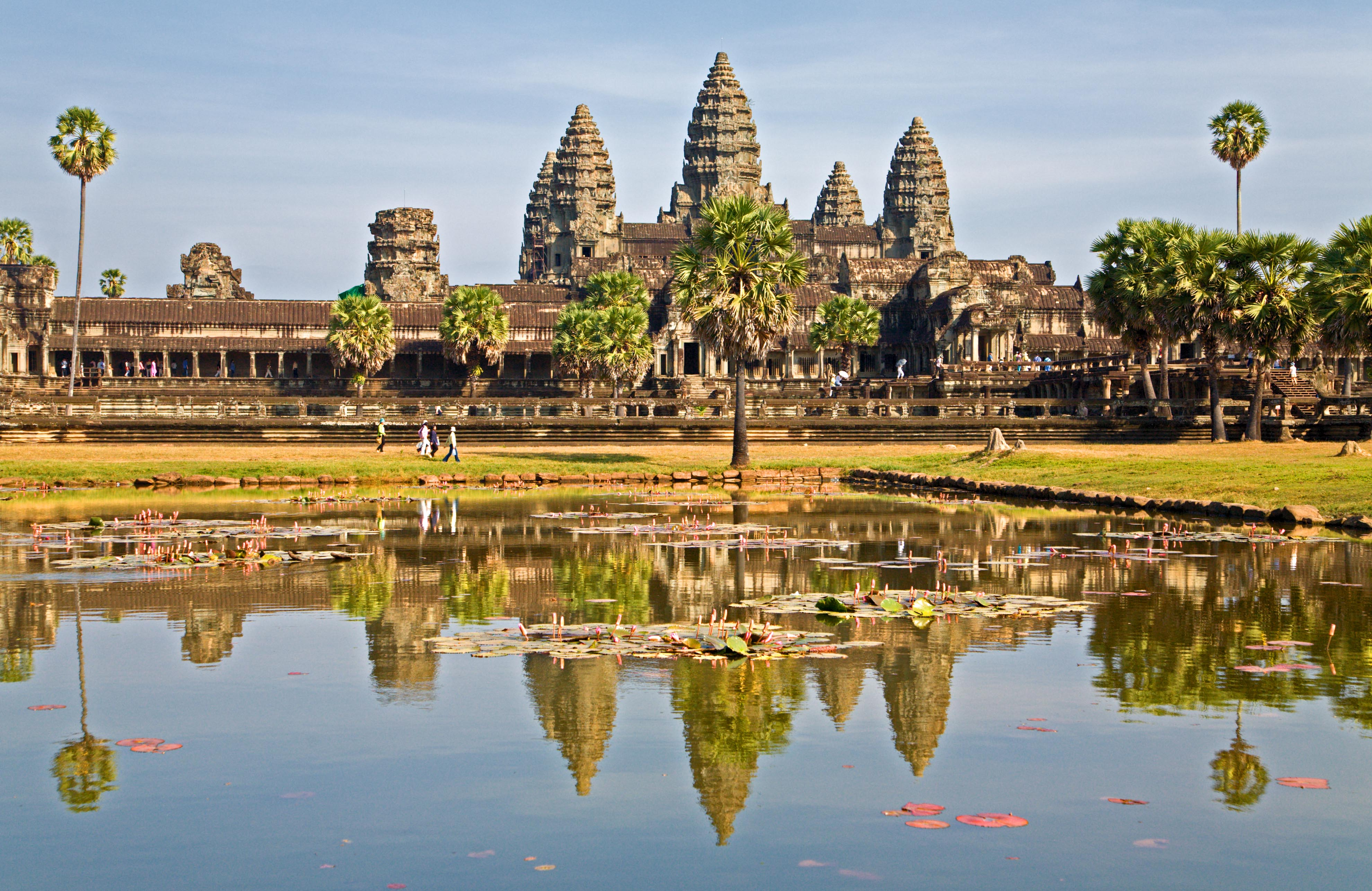
Angkor Wat

The Khmer Empire's prosperous capital, Angkor (Khmer: អង្គរ, "Capital City", derived from Sanskrit "nagara"), contains some of the most important and the most magnificent example of Khmer temple architecture. The classic style of Angkorian temple is demonstrated by the 12th century Angkor Wat.The main superstructure of typical Khmer temple is a towering prasat called prang which houses the garbhagriha inner chamber, where the murti of Vishnu or Shiva, or a lingam resides. Khmer temples were typically enclosed by a concentric series of walls, with the central sanctuary in the middle; this arrangement represented the mountain ranges surrounding Mount Meru, the mythical home of the gods. Enclosures are the spaces between these walls, and between the innermost wall and the temple itself. The walls defining the enclosures of Khmer temples are frequently lined by galleries, while passage through the walls is by way of gopuras located at the cardinal points. The main entrance usually adorned with elevated causeway with cruciform terrace.

==== Thailand ====
Thailand was heavily influenced by the culture and religions of India, starting with the Kingdom of Funan around the first century until the Khmer Empire. Indianised kingdoms such as the Mon, the Khmer Empire and Malay states of the Malay Peninsula and Sumatra ruled the region.

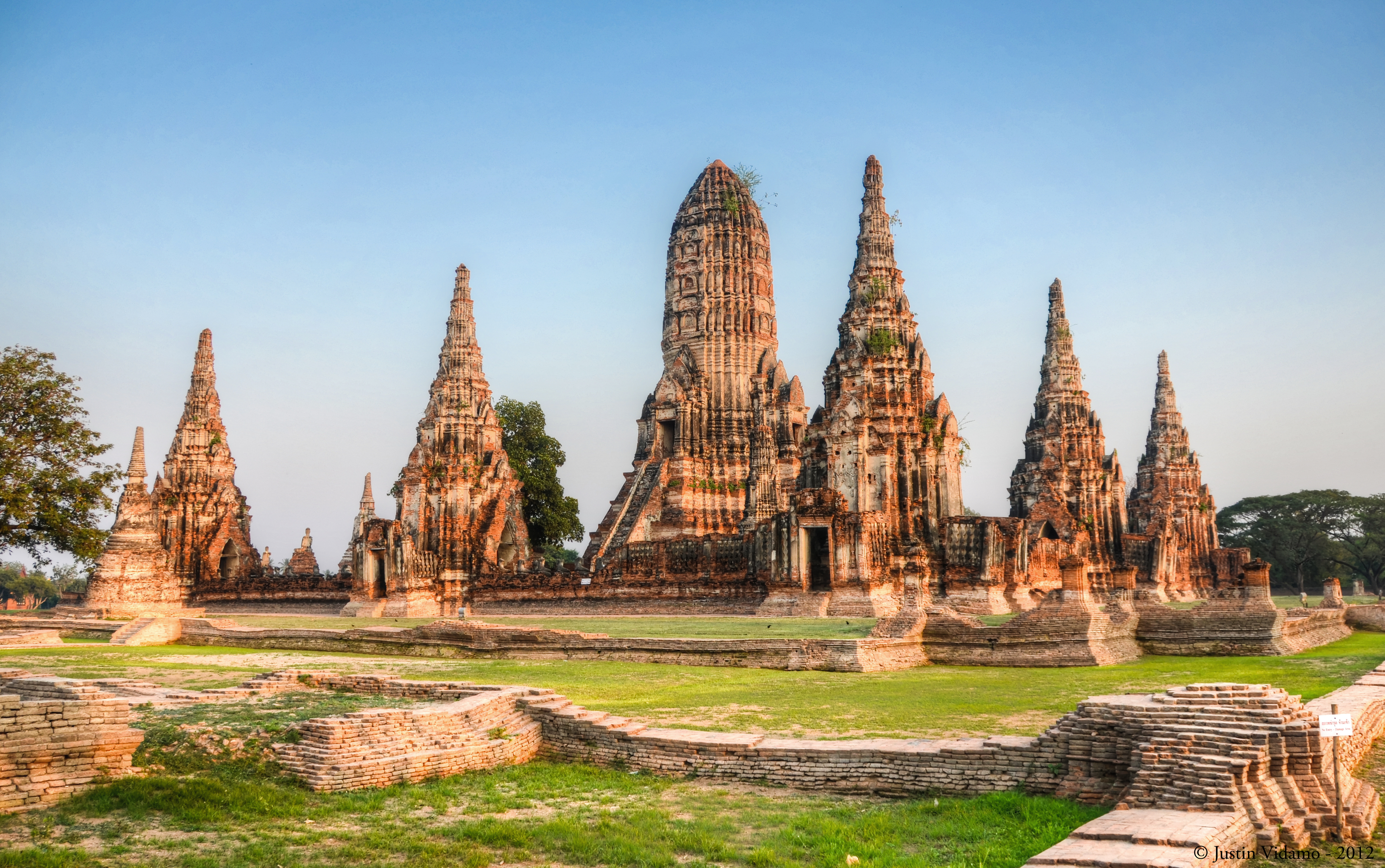
Wat Chaiwatthanaram, an example of Thai style prang

Thailand under Khmer rule saw inclusion of Indian Hindu temple influenced Khmer architectural style. The Khmer prangs resembled north Indian temples' shikhara and rekha (temple towers) elements. The early 10th century and the late 12th century prangs in Thailand were influenced by the Khmer architects of the great temple complexes of Angkor Wat and Angkor Thom. After the Khmer Empire collapsed, the Thai building masters of the Sukhothai Kingdom adapted the Prang form. The Thai temple falls into one of two broad categories: the stupa-style solid temple and the prang-style. The prangs can also be found in various forms in Sukhothai, Lopburi, Bangkok (Wat Arun). Sizes may vary, but usually the prangs measure between 15 and 40 metres (49 and 131 ft) in height, and resemble a towering corn-cob like structure. They extended and developed it. The building material was no more separate small sandstone blocks, instead the Thais built the Prang in brick or laterite covered with stucco. And the cella could be reached only by stairs. An example for this is the Prang of the Wat Mahathat in Phitsanulok. Later developments of the Prang suggested the cella only. The entrance door became a niche, in which was placed the Buddharupa (Buddha statue), which had originally taken the central position inside. For reasons of symmetry the niche was repeated on all four sides. On its pinnacle was a Trishul, the "weapon of Indra".

==== Malaysia ====
Indo-Saracenic architecture was a revivalist architectural style mostly used by British architects in India in the later 19th century, especially in public and government buildings in the British Raj, and the palaces of rulers of the princely states. It drew stylistic and decorative elements from native Indo-Islamic architecture, especially Mughal architecture. The basic layout and structure of the buildings tended to be close to that used in contemporary buildings in other revivalist styles, such as Gothic revival and Neo-Classical, with specific Indian features and decoration added.

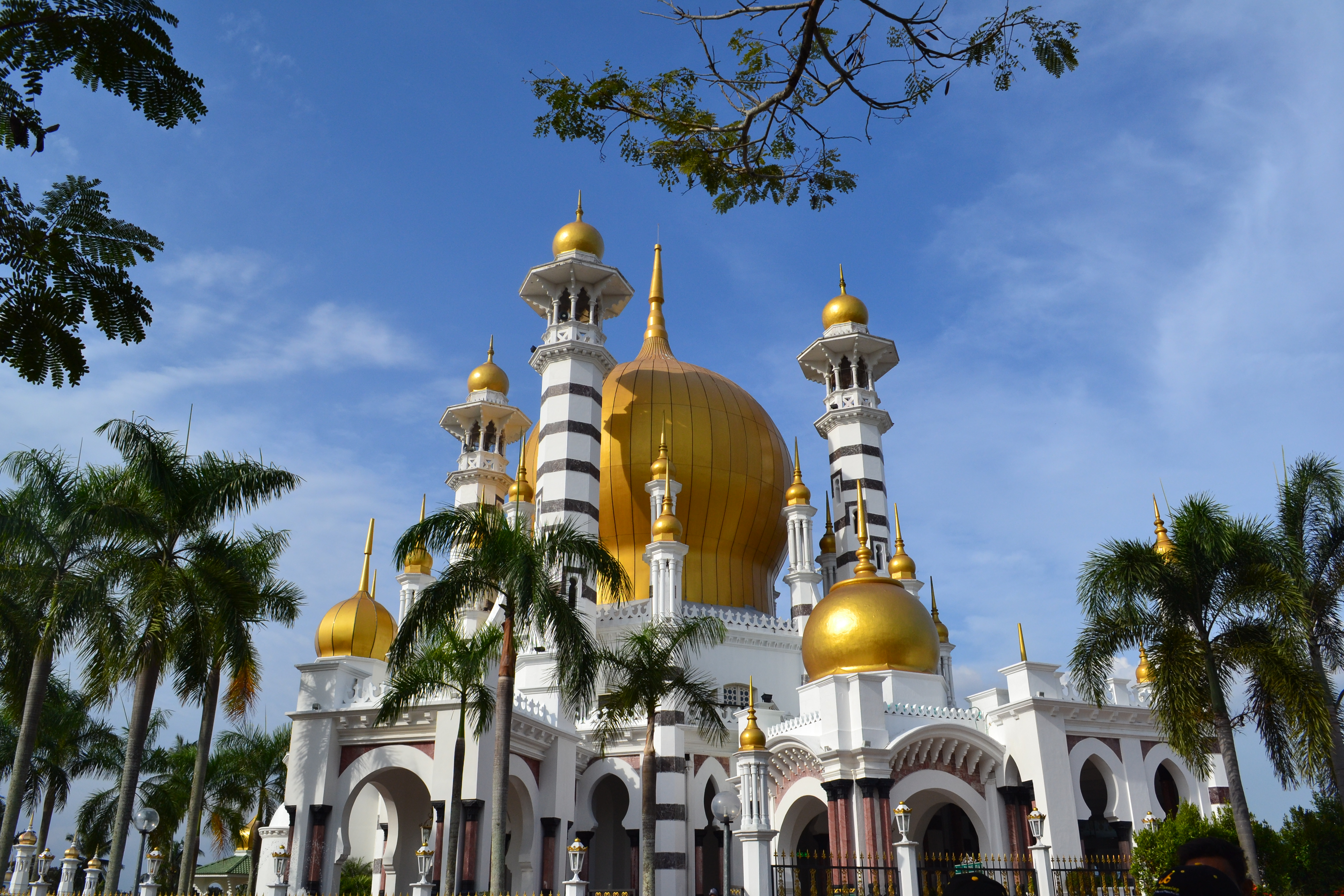
Masjid Ubudiah, showcasing elements of Indo-Saracenic style

According to Thomas R. Metcalf, a leading scholar of the style, "the Indo-Saracenic, with its imagined past turned to the purposes of British colonialism, took shape outside India [ie the subcontinent] most fully only in Malaya".

In Malaysia, due to British colonial influence and the migration of Muslims from India, many Mughal architectural elements in the design of mosques were incorporated. British Malaya was a predominantly Muslim society, where there was hardly any recent tradition of building in brick or stone, with even mosques and the palaces of the local rulers built in the abundant local hardwoods. Kuala Lumpur was a 19th-century foundation, only a small settlement when the British decided to make it the capital of their new Federated Malay States in 1895, and needed a number of large public buildings. The British decided to use the Islamic style they were used to from India, despite it having little relationship to existing local architectural styles.

==== Myanmar ====
Much of Myanmar's architecture is tied to ancient Indian culture, and can be traced to the country's earliest known inhabitants. The Mon and Pyu people were the first two influential groups to migrate to Myanmar, and the first Indo-Chinese adherents of Theravada Buddhism. Beikthano, one of the first Pyu centres, contains urbanesque foundations which include a monastery and stupa-like structures. These Pyu stupas, the first Indian foundations in Myanmar, were built from 200 BC to 100 CE and were sometimes used for burial.

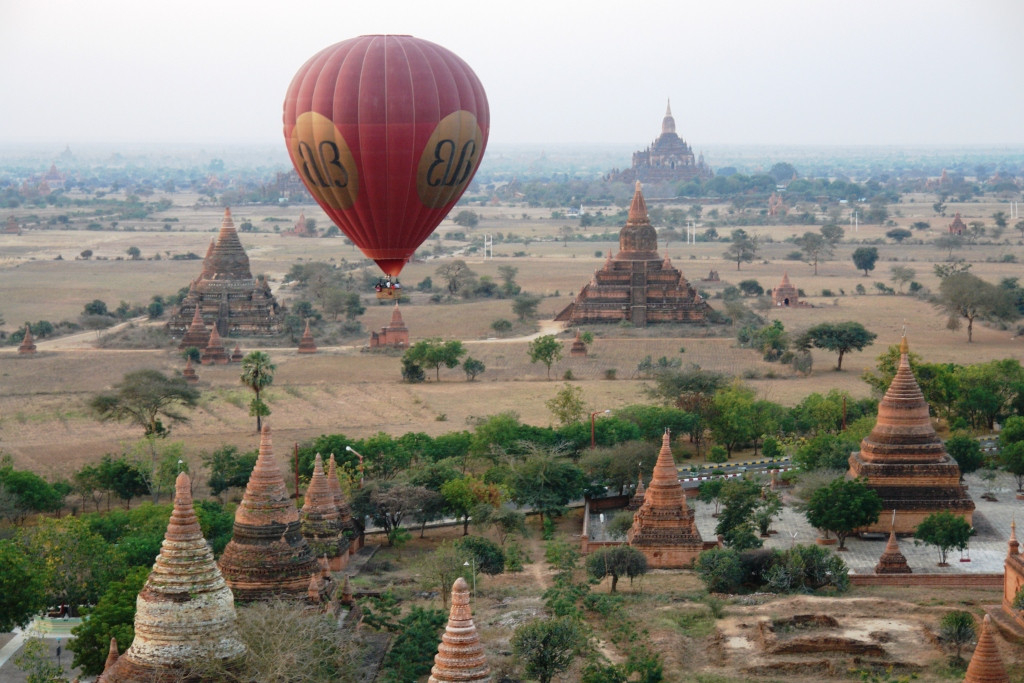
Temples in Bagan

During the Pagan Kingdom, the Pyu-style stupas were transformed into monuments reminiscent of alms bowls or gourd-shaped domes, unbaked brick, tapered and rising roofs, Buddha niches, polylobed arches and ornamental doorways influenced by Bengali Pala Empire and its monuments. The Ananda Temple (finished in 1090), one of the first temples erected in Bagan, was influenced by Indian architecture. Architectural features of the temple include brick vaulted halls, Buddha statues, tapered roofs and the absence of terraces.

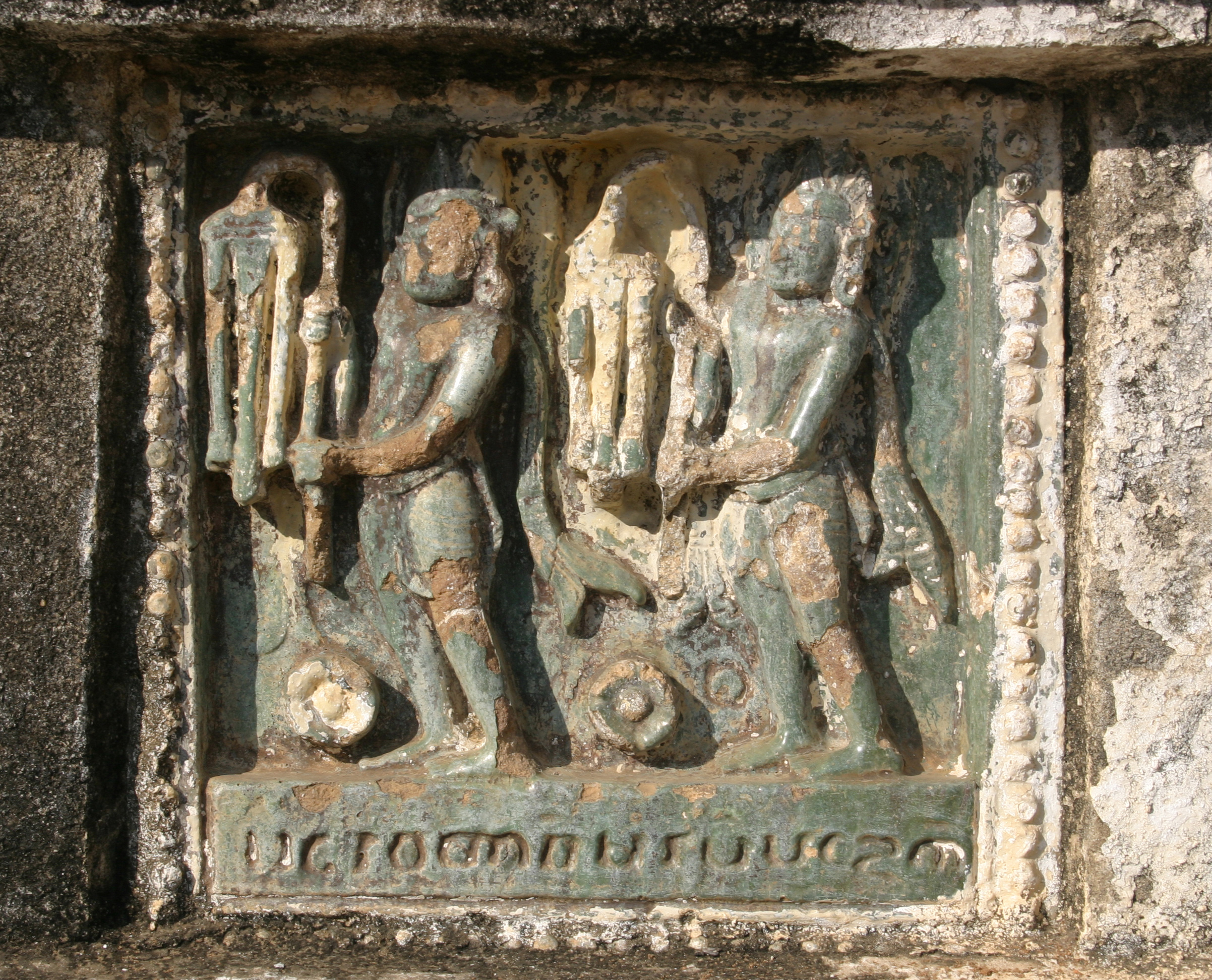
Ananda Temple terracotta plaque glazed in green

Pala influence and spread of Buddhism in Myanmar also brought in terracotta tiles from Bengal. The terracotta plaques at Pagan are made with well kneaded and fired clay but all the plaques are glazed with green colour.

Another example of these cultural influences include the Ananda Temple in Bagan built in the 11th century AD under the ruling of King Kyansittha. At these times, Buddhist and Vaisnava monks travelled to Burma from Bengal and discussed commonalities about the beauty of the temples of their region. Therefore, the king heard the monks and decided to build a temple with these western inspirations. Although, the Ananda Temple display its eastern origins, the western features remain obvious and demonstrate its uniqueness.

=== Influence in East Asia ===
==== Torii, Paifang, Hongsalmun, Sao Ching Cha ====
Torana Derivatives

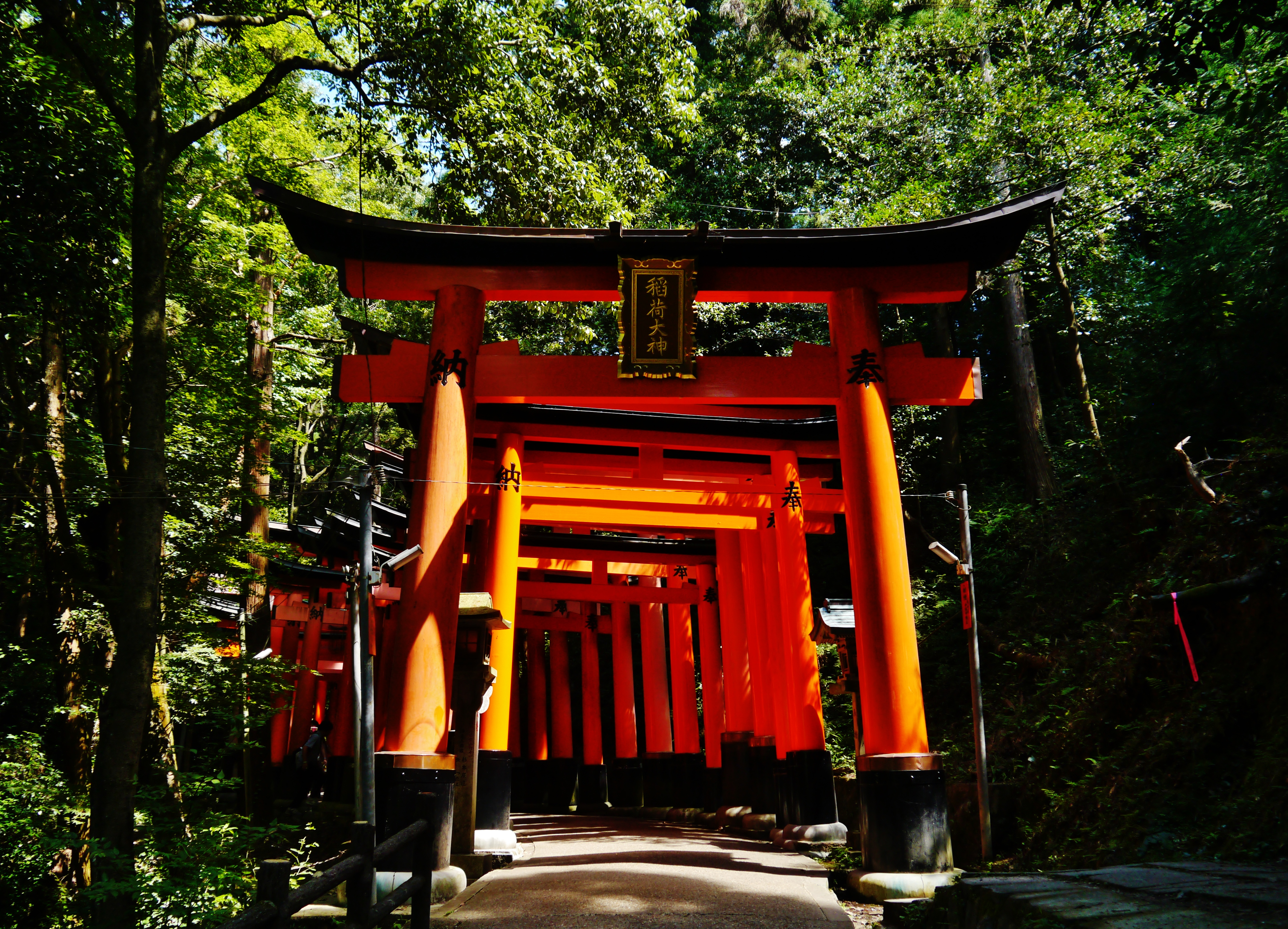
Torii path leading to Fushimi Inari-taisha

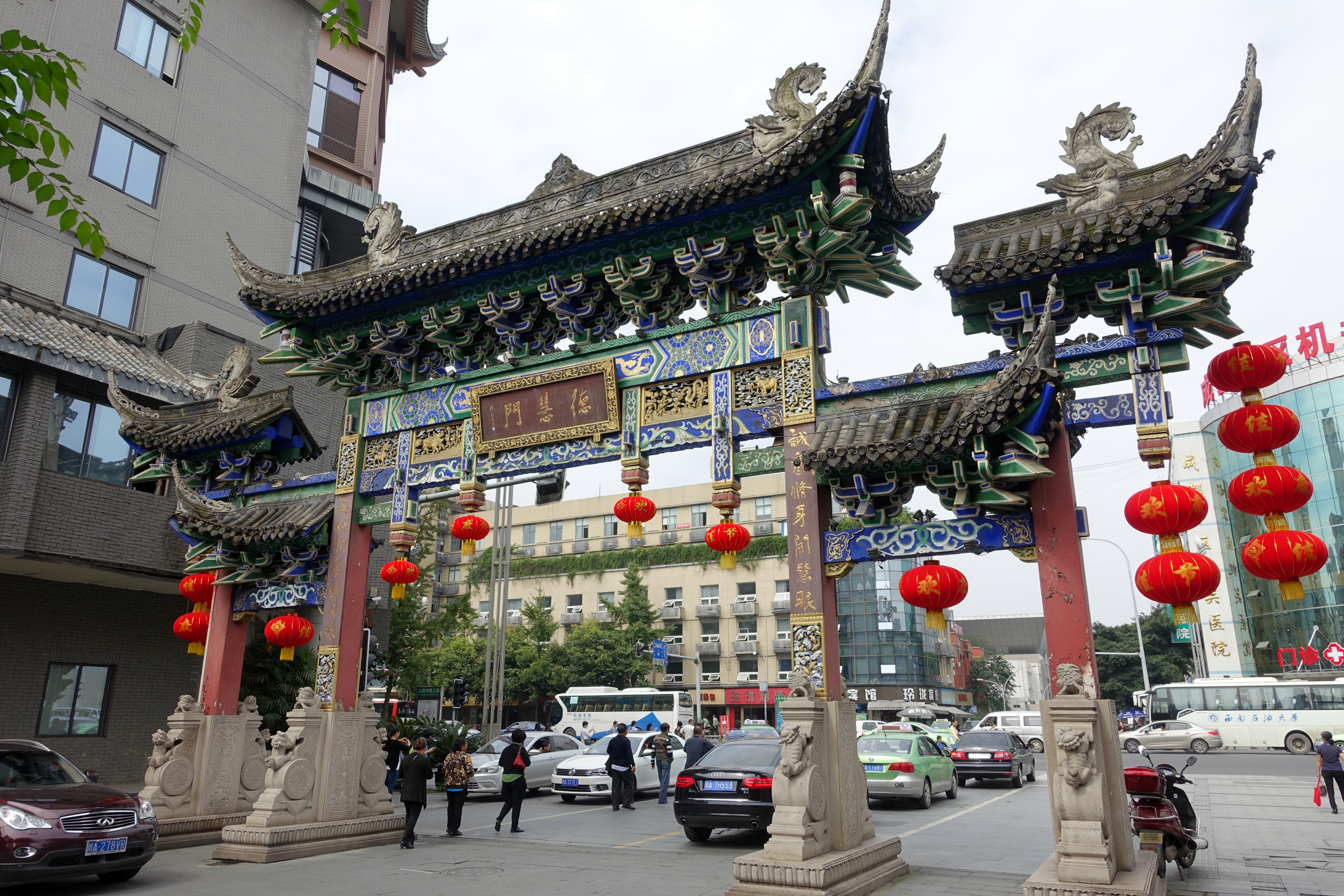
Paifang in Chengdu, China

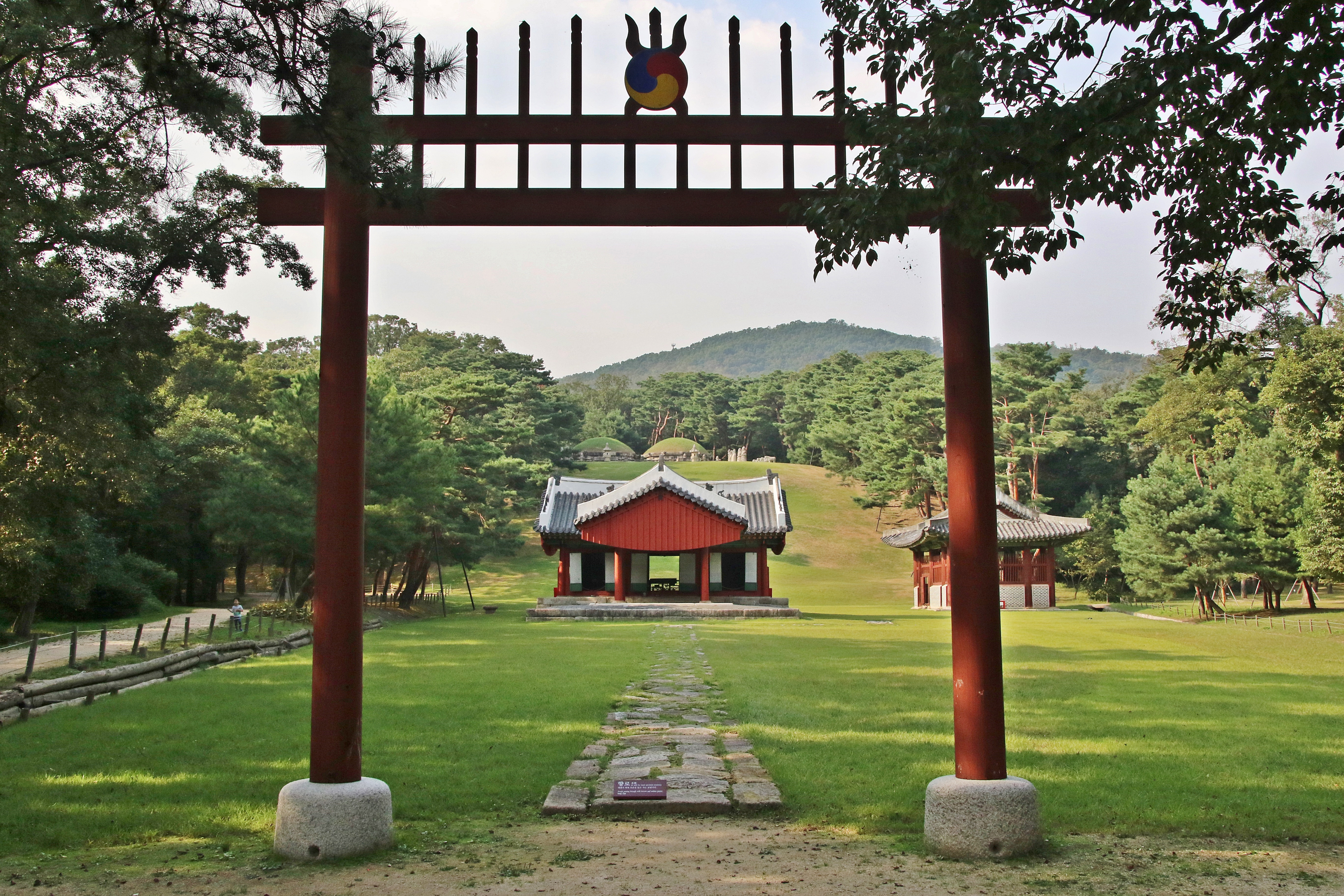
Hongsalmun of Heolleung Royal Tomb

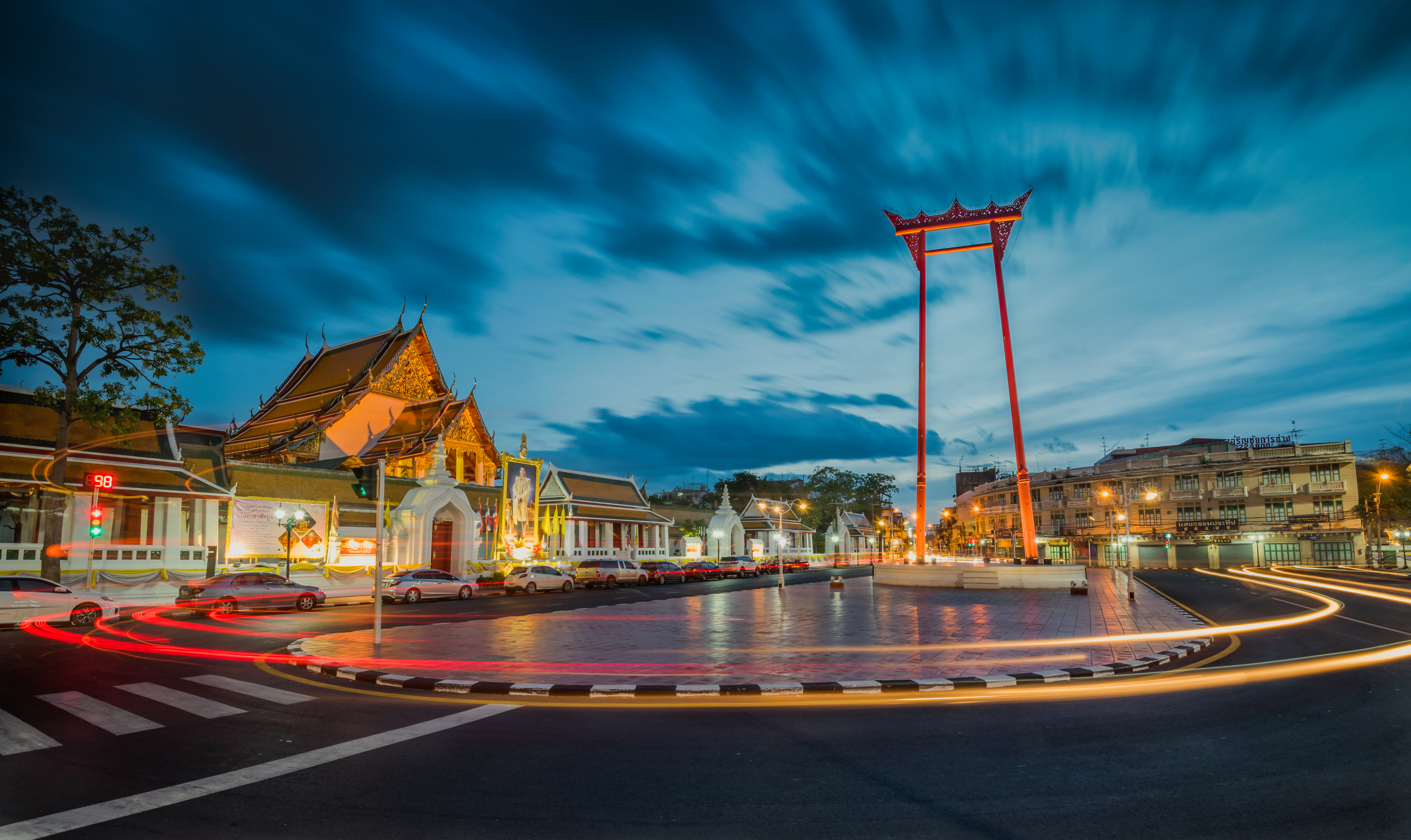
Giant Swing and Wat Suthat

Ancient Indian torana sacred gateway architecture has influenced gateway architecture across Asia, specially where Buddhism was transmitted from India; Chinese paifang gateways, Japanese torii gateways, Korean Hongsalmun gateways, and Sao Ching Cha in Thailand have been derived from the Indian torana. The functions of all are similar, but they generally differ based on their respective architectural styles.

The torii, a gateway erected on the approach to every Shinto shrine, may be derived from the Indian word torana. While the Indian term denotes a gateway, the Japanese characters can be translated as "bird perch". The function of a torii is to mark the entrance to a sacred space. For this reason, the road leading to a Shinto shrine (sandō) is almost always straddled by one or more torii, which are therefore the easiest way to distinguish a shrine from a Buddhist temple.

Hongsalmun literally means ‘gate with red arrows’, referring to the set of pointed spikes on its top. In the past, spikes in between columns did not exist. The color is said to be red because of the belief that the color repels ghosts. The gate is composed of 2 round poles set vertically and 2 transverse bars. These pillars are usually over 9 metres (30 ft) in height. There is no roof and door-gate. In the middle top gate, the symbol of the trisula and the taegeuk image are placed.

A paifang, also known as a pailou, is a traditional style of Chinese architectural arch or gateway structure derived from the torana temple-gate in ancient India, has taken on traditional Chinese architectural characteristics such as multi-tiered roofs, various supporting posts, and archway-shapes of traditional gates and towers.

== Foreign Influence on Indian Architecture ==
=== Hellenistic influence ===
The Greek conquests in India under Alexander the Great were limited in time (327–326 BCE) and in extent, but they had extensive long term effects as Greeks settled for centuries at the doorstep of India. After these events, the Greeks (described as Yona or Yavana in Indian sources from the Greek "Ionian") were able to maintain a structured presence at the door of India for about three centuries, through the Seleucid Empire and the Greco-Bactrian Kingdom, down to the time of the Indo-Greek kingdoms, which ended sometimes in the 1st century CE.

Hellenistic influence

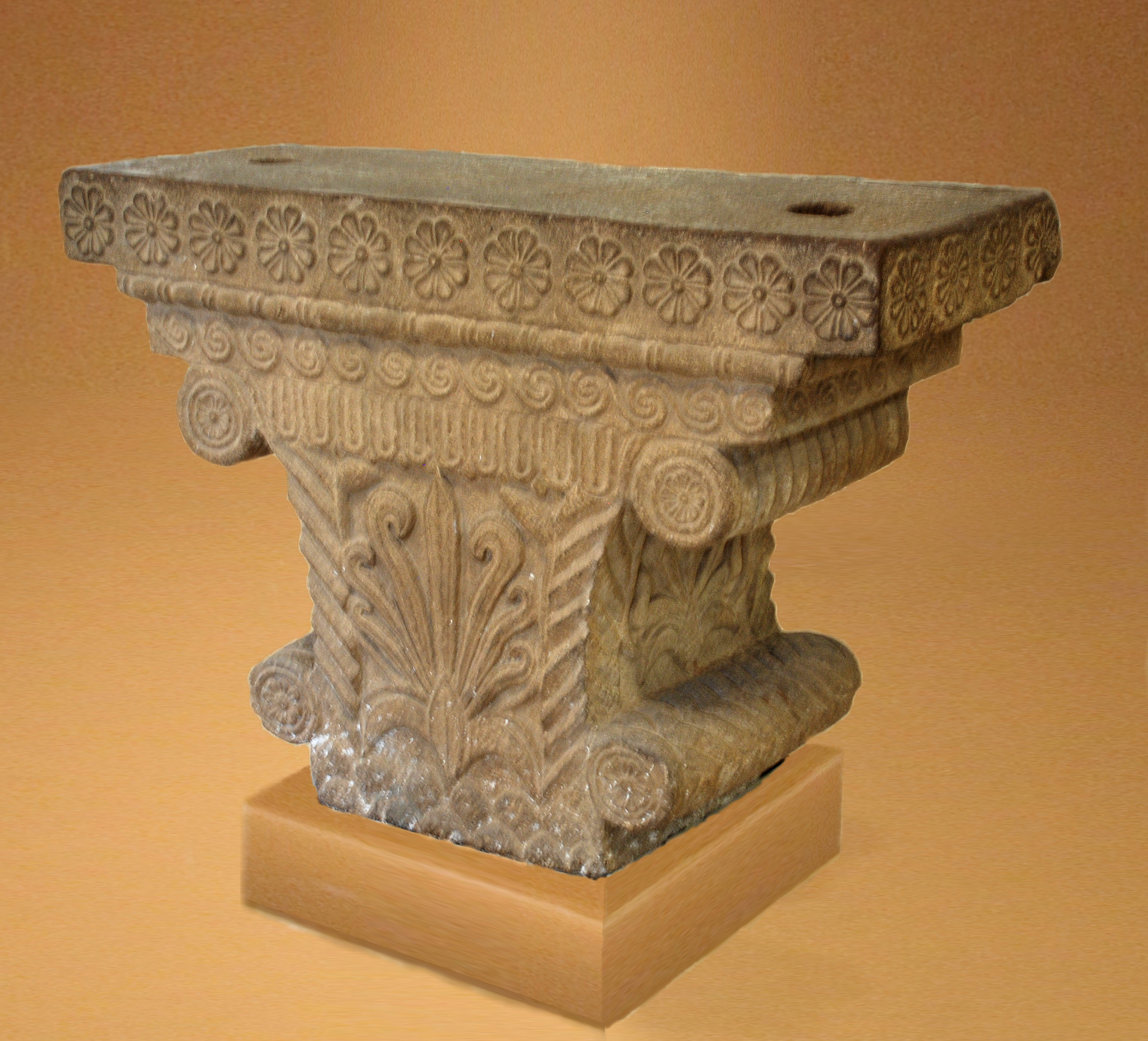
Pataliputra capital

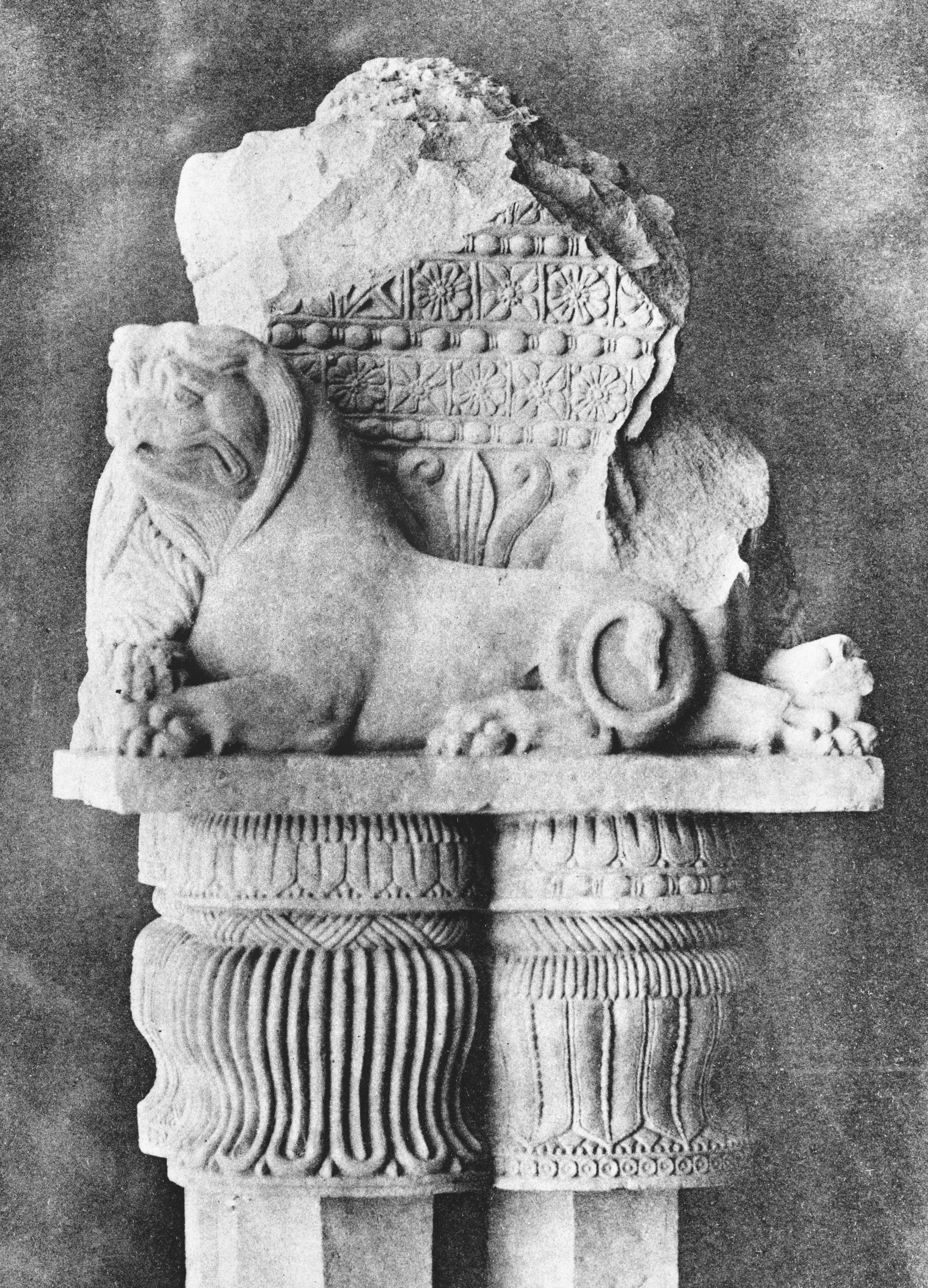
Bharhut pillar capital

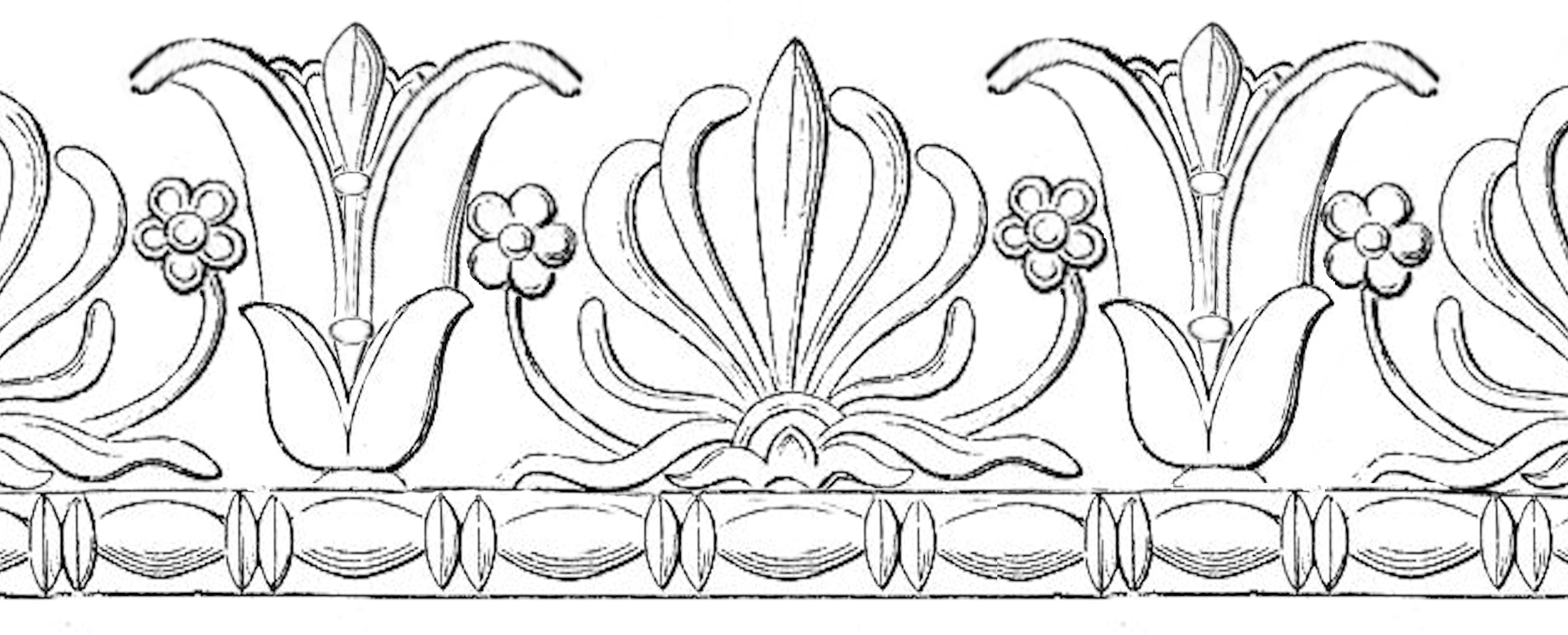
Drawing of Allahabad pillar capital flame palmette

During that time, the city of Ai-Khanoum, capital of the Greco-Bactrian Kingdom and the cities of Sirkap, were founded in what is now Pakistan on the Greek Hippodamian grid plan, and Sagala, now located in Pakistan 10 km from the border with India, interacted heavily with the Indian subcontinent. It is considered that Ai-Khanoum and Sirkap may have been primary actors in transmitting Western artistic influence to India, for example in the creation of the quasi-Ionic Pataliputra capital or the floral friezes of the Pillars of Ashoka. Numerous Greek ambassadors, such as Megasthenes, Deimachus and Dionysius, stayed at the Mauryan court in Pataliputra.

During the Mauryan period (c. 321–185 BCE), and especially during the time of Emperor Ashoka (c.268–232 BCE), Hellenistic influence seems to have played a role in the establishment of Indian monumental stone architecture. Excavations in the ancient palace of Pataliputra have brought to light Hellenistic sculptural works, and Hellenistic influence appear in the Pillars of Ashoka at about the same period.

During that period, several instance of artistic influence are known, particular in the area of monumental stone sculpture and statuary, an area with no known precedents in India. The main period of stone architectural creation seems to correspond to the period of Ashoka's reign. Before that, Indians had a tradition of wooden architecture, remains of wooden palisades were discovered at archaeological sites in Pataliputra, confirmed the Classical accounts.

The first examples of stone architecture were also found in the palace compound of Pataliputra, with the distinctly Hellenistic Pataliputra capital and a pillared hall using polished-stone columns. The other remarkable example of monumental stone architecture is that of the Pillars of Ashoka, themselves displaying Hellenistic influence. There is also very early stone architecture in the palace at Kosambi, including true arches used in the underground chambers, from the last phase of the palace in the 1st or 2nd century CE.

==== Pataliputra capital ====
The Pataliputra capital is a monumental rectangular capital with volutes and Classical designs, that was discovered in the palace ruins of the ancient Mauryan Empire capital city of Pataliputra (modern Patna, northeastern India). It is dated to the 3rd century BCE. It is, together with the Pillars of Ashoka one of the first known examples of Indian stone architecture, as no Indian stone monuments or sculptures are known from before that period. It is also one of the first archaeological clues suggesting Hellenistic influence on the arts of India, in this case sculptural palatial art.

==== Pillars of Ashoka ====
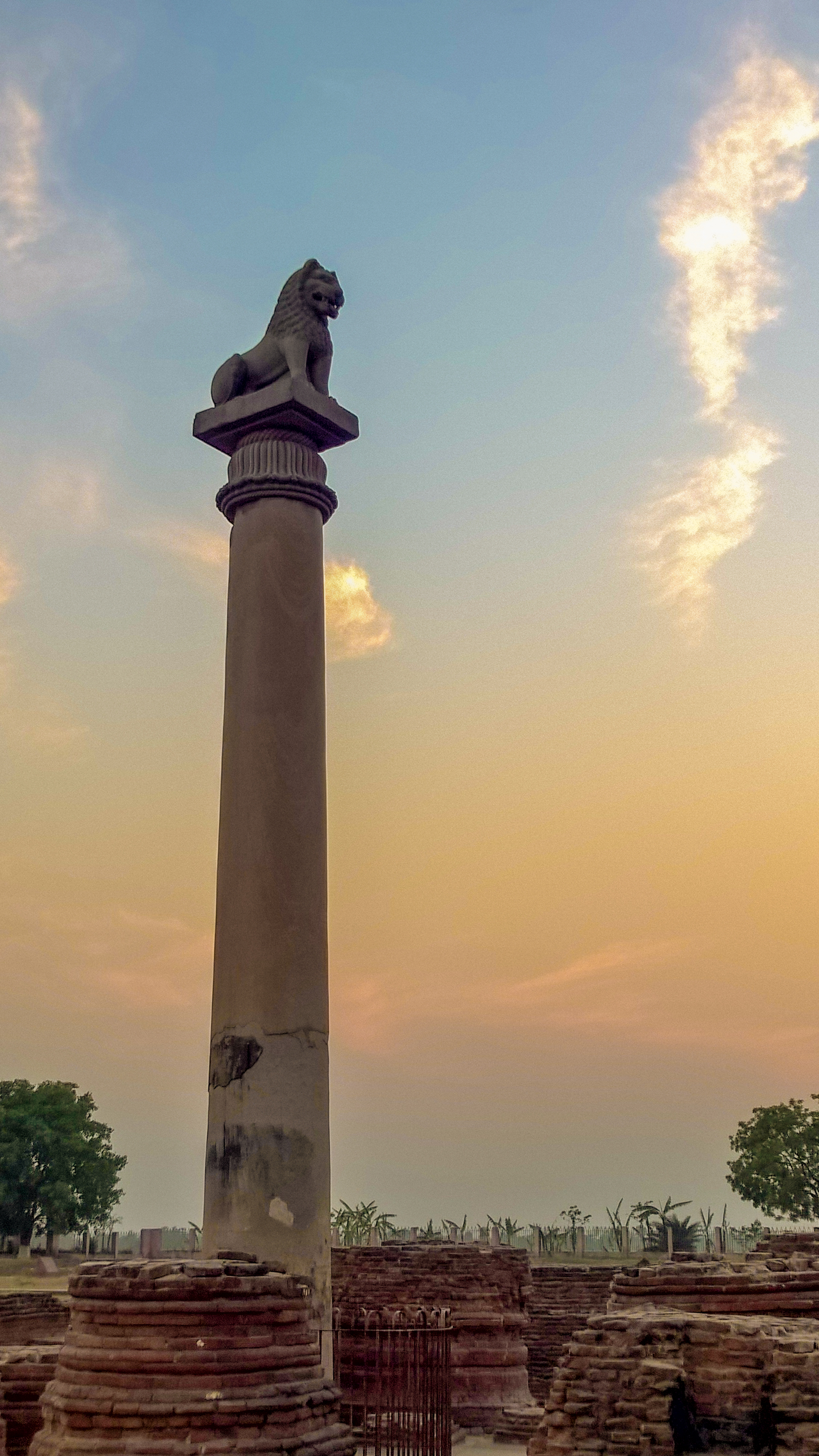
Ashokan Pillar in Vaishali

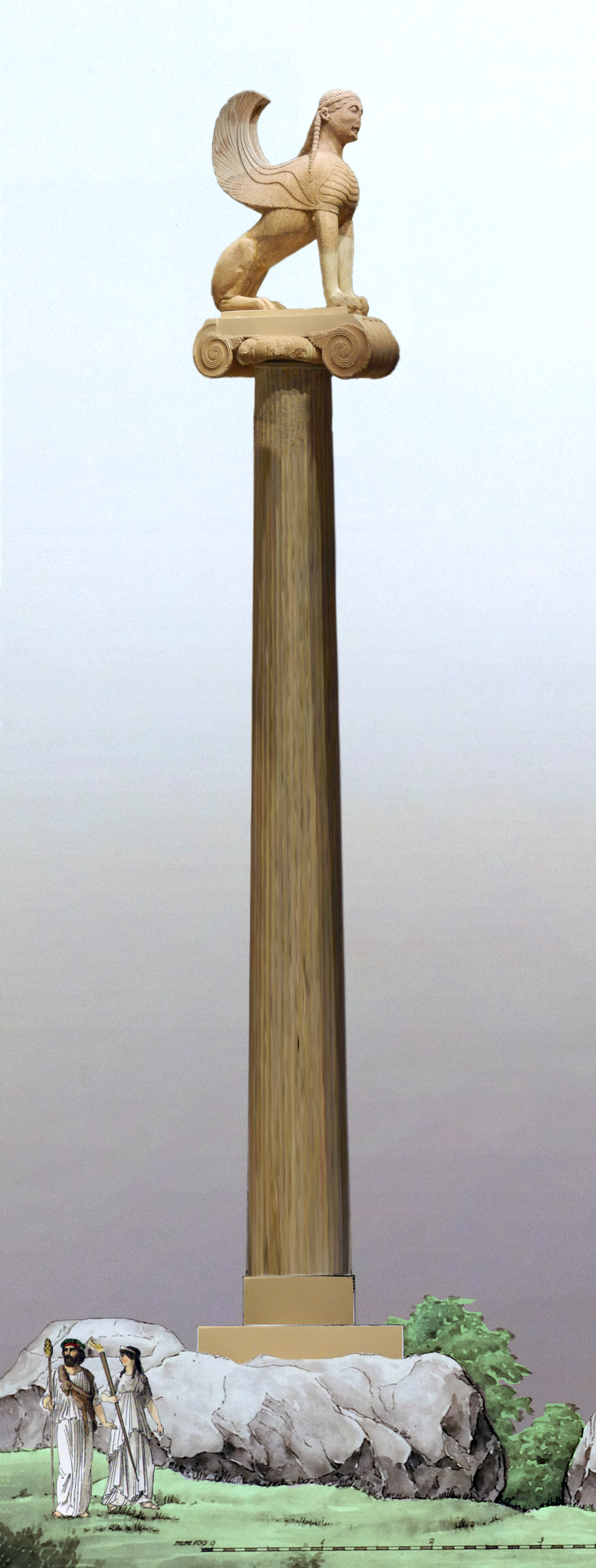
Sphinx of Naxos at Delphi

The Pillars of Ashoka were built during the reign of the Maurya Empire. They were new attempts at mastering stone architecture, as no Indian stone monuments or sculptures are known from before that period.

There are altogether seven remaining capitals, five with lions, one with an elephant and one with a zebu bull. One of them, the four lions of Sarnath, has become the State Emblem of India.

The animal capitals are composed of a lotiform base, with an abacus decorated with floral, symbolic or animal designs, topped by the realistic depiction of an animal, thought to each represent a traditional direction in India. Greek columns of the 6th century BCE such as the Sphinx of Naxos, a 12.5-metre (41 ft) Ionic column crowned by a sitting animal in the religious centre of Delphi, may have been an inspiration for the pillars of Ashoka.

===== Flame palmette =====
The flame palmette, central decorative element of the Pataliputra pillar is considered as a purely Greek motif. The first appearance of "flame palmettes" goes back to the stand-alone floral akroteria of the Parthenon (447–432 BCE), and slightly later at the Temple of Athena Nike.

Flame palmettes were then introduced into friezes of floral motifs in replacement of the regular palmette. Flame palmettes are used extensively in India floral friezes, starting with the floral friezes on the capitals of the pillar of Ashoka, and they are likely to have originated with Greek or Near Eastern art. A monumental flame palmette can be seen on the top of the Sunga gateway at Bharhut.

=== Persian influence ===
==== Achaemenid influence ====
Achaemenid Derivatives

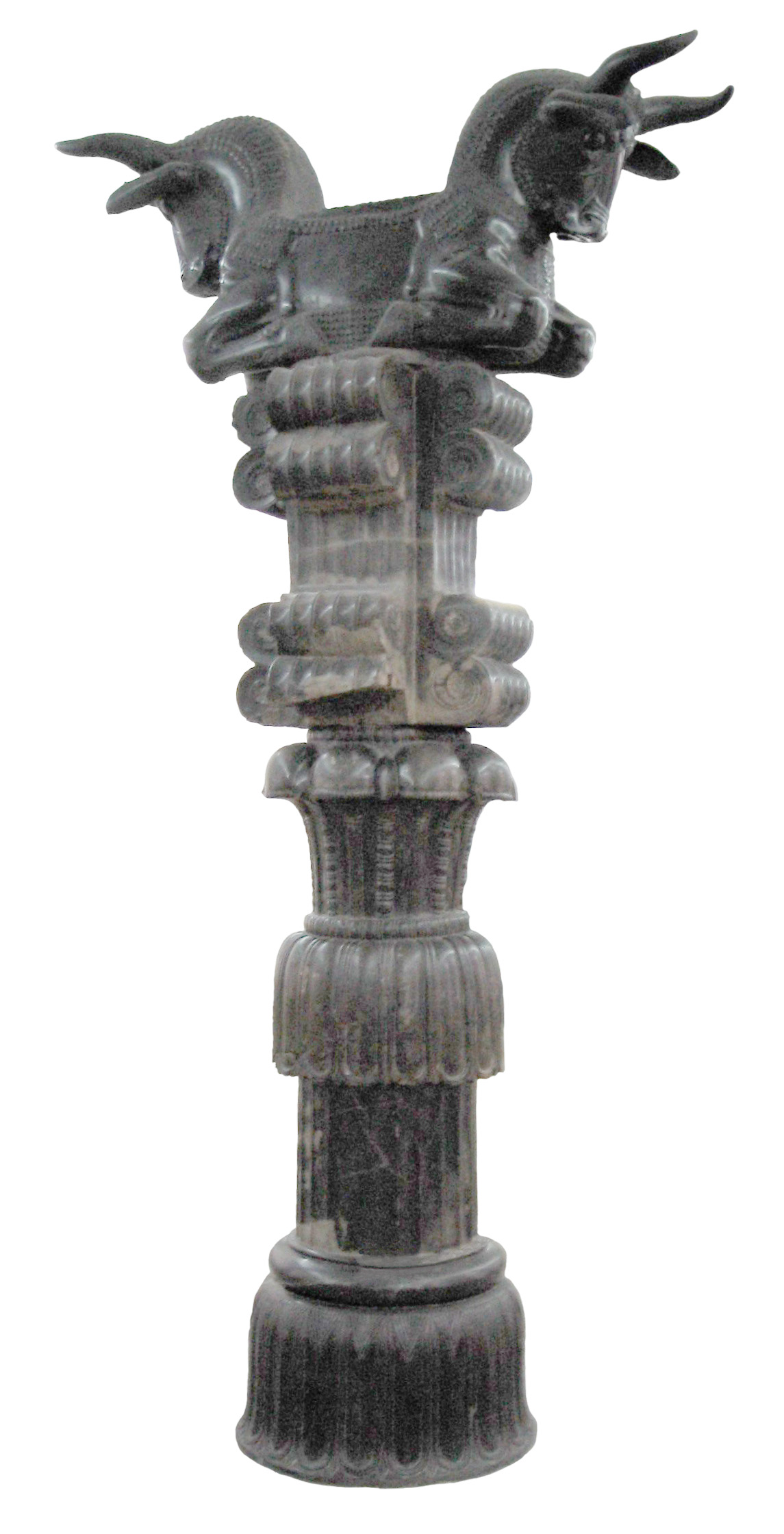
Achaemenid capital in Persepolis

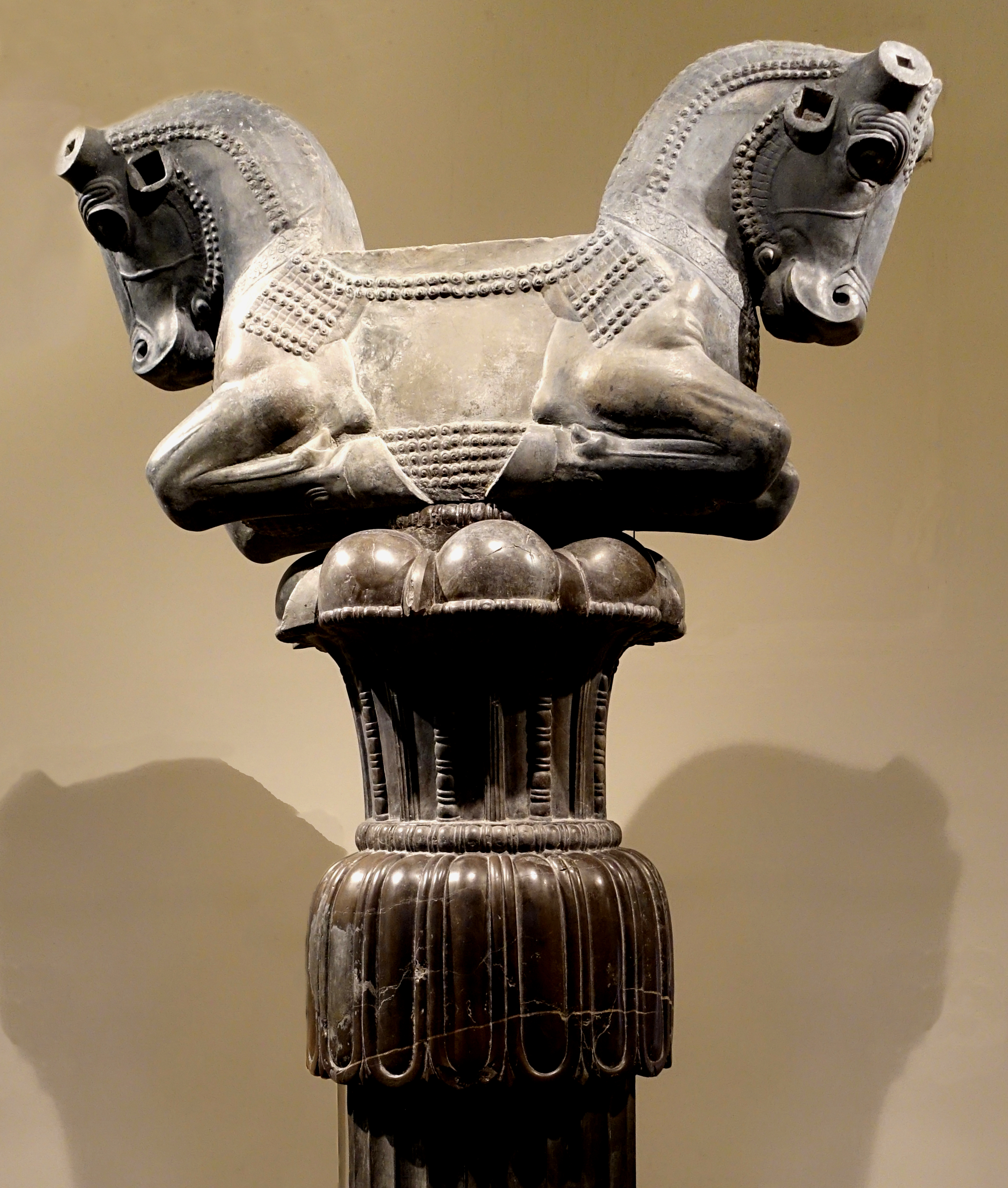
Highly polished Achaemenid load-bearing column, Persepolis

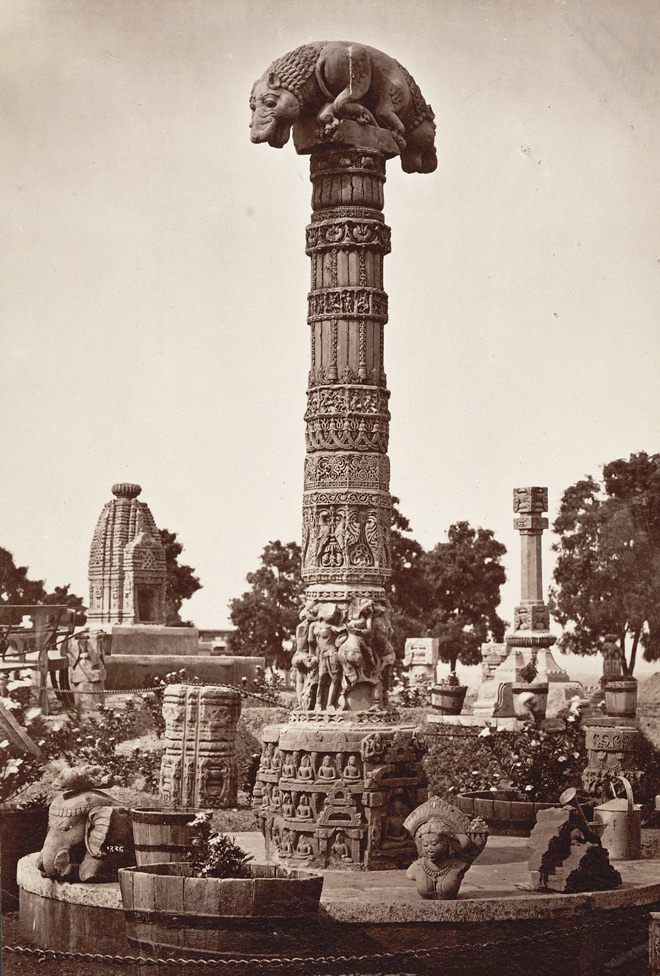
Lion capital in Vardhana

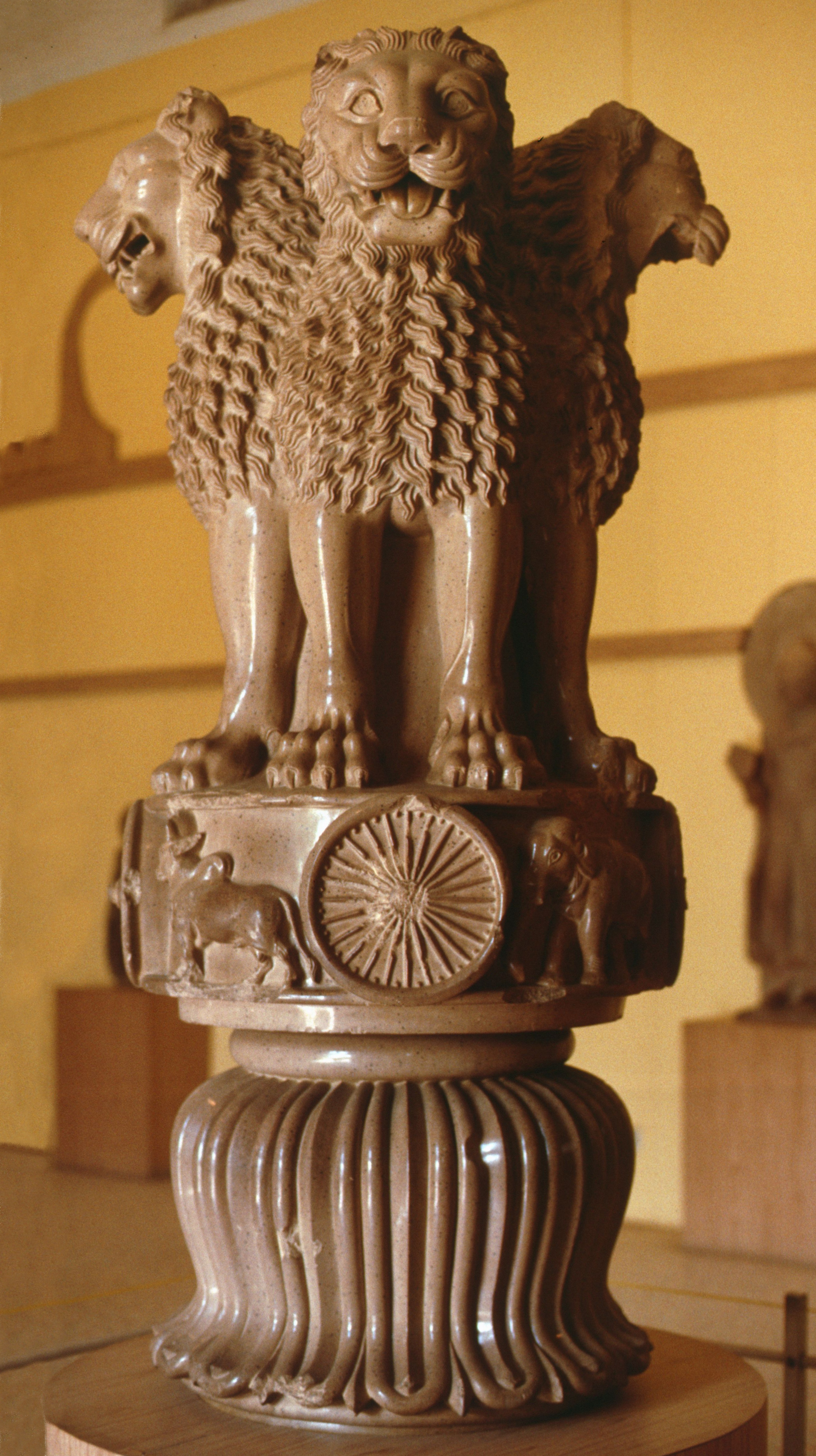
Lion Capital of Ashoka from Sarnath

Achaemenid influence like stone polishing and dual-headed capital from conquest by Persians and Greeks

Lion Capital of Ashoka from Sarnath. The Achaemenid Empire conquered and governed the territories of the north-western regions of the Indian subcontinent, from the 6th to 4th centuries BCE. The conquest occurred in two phases. The first invasion was conducted around 535 BCE by Cyrus the Great, who founded the Achaemenid Empire. Cyrus annexed the regions west of the Indus River, which formed the eastern border of his empire. Following the death of Cyrus, Darius the Great established his dynasty and began to reconquer former provinces and further expand the extent of the empire. Around 518 BCE Darius crossed the Himalayas into India to initiate a second period of conquest by annexing regions up to the Jhelum River in Punjab. Each invasion brought in new style and soon started to influence the art and architectural styles in India.

Various Indian artefacts tend to suggest some Perso-Hellenistic artistic influence in India, mainly felt during the time of the Mauryan Empire.

The Pataliputra palace with its pillared hall shows decorative influences of the Achaemenid palaces and Persepolis and may have used the help of foreign craftsmen. Mauryan rulers may have even imported craftsmen from abroad to build royal monuments. This may be the result of the formative influence of craftsmen employed from Persia following the disintegration of the Achaemenid Empire after the conquests of Alexander the Great.

The renowned Mauryan polish, especially used in the Pillars of Ashoka, may also have been a technique imported from the Achaemenid Empire.

==== Rock cut architecture ====
The similarity of the 4th century BCE Lycian barrel-vaulted tombs, such as the tomb of Payava, in the western part of the Achaemenid Empire, with the Indian architectural design of the Chaitya (starting at least a century later from circa 250 BCE, with the Lomas Rishi caves in the Barabar caves group), suggests that the designs of the Lycian rock-cut tombs travelled to India along the trade routes across the Achaemenid Empire.

Early on, James Fergusson, in his " Illustrated Handbook of Architecture", while describing the very progressive evolution from wooden architecture to stone architecture in various ancient civilizations, has commented that "In India, the form and construction of the older Buddhist temples resemble so singularly these examples in Lycia". The structural similarities, down to many architectural details, with the Chaitya-type Indian Buddhist temple designs, such as the "same pointed form of roof, with a ridge", are further developed in The cave temples of India. The Lycian tombs, dated to the 4th century BCE, are either free-standing or rock-cut barrel-vaulted sarcophagi, placed on a high base, with architectural features carved in stone to imitate wooden structures. There are numerous rock-cut equivalents to the free-standing structures and decorated with reliefs. Fergusson went on to suggest an "Indian connection", and some form of cultural transfer across the Achaemenid Empire. The ancient transfer of Lycian designs for rock-cut monuments to India is considered as "quite probable".

== Criticism and Alternative Interpretations ==
The Lycian-influence hypothesis remains controversial and is not widely accepted in modern scholarship. Several objections have been raised in academic literature.

A commonly cited issue is the presence of a strong indigenous timber-based architectural tradition in early India. The earliest preserved chaitya-arch façade, found at the Lomas Rishi Cave in the Barabar Hills (c. 3rd century BCE), is widely agreed to be a direct imitation of pre-existing wooden hut forms. This supports the view that early stone chaityas evolved from local wooden prototypes rather than foreign funerary structures.

Another objection is the absence of direct textual or archaeological evidence linking Lycian architectural forms to India. Although long-distance connections through the Achaemenid Empire are sometimes proposed as a possible transmission route, no securely documented mechanism for the transfer of architectural knowledge has been established.

Modern scholars also argue that features shared by Lycian tombs and Indian chaityas—such as the barrel vault, the apsidal plan, and the ribbed ceiling—may represent parallel architectural evolution rather than direct borrowing. These forms can arise independently due to similar structural, functional, or material considerations.

The two architectural types also serve fundamentally different purposes. Lycian tombs were funerary monuments intended for elite burials, whereas chaitya halls functioned as ritual and devotional spaces housing stupas for Buddhist worship, which complicates arguments for a simple line of influence.

Finally, a minority argument inverts the proposed direction of influence, with some scholars suggesting that certain features of Lycian tombs may themselves reflect artistic exchanges with South Asia in the wider context of Achaemenid-period cultural contact.

=== Masarh Lion ===
Perso-Hellenistic influence

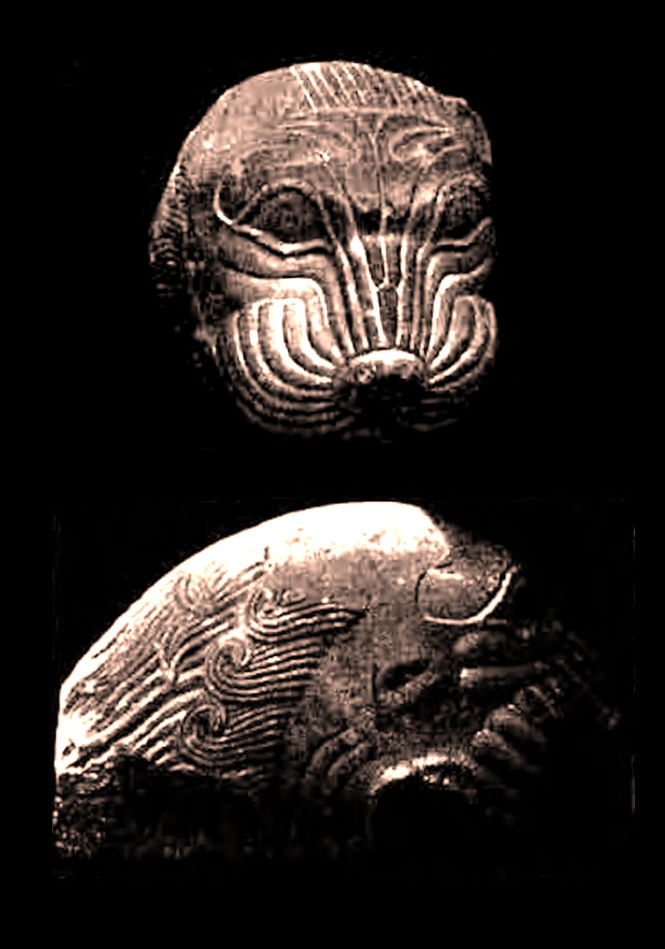
Masarh lion sculpture

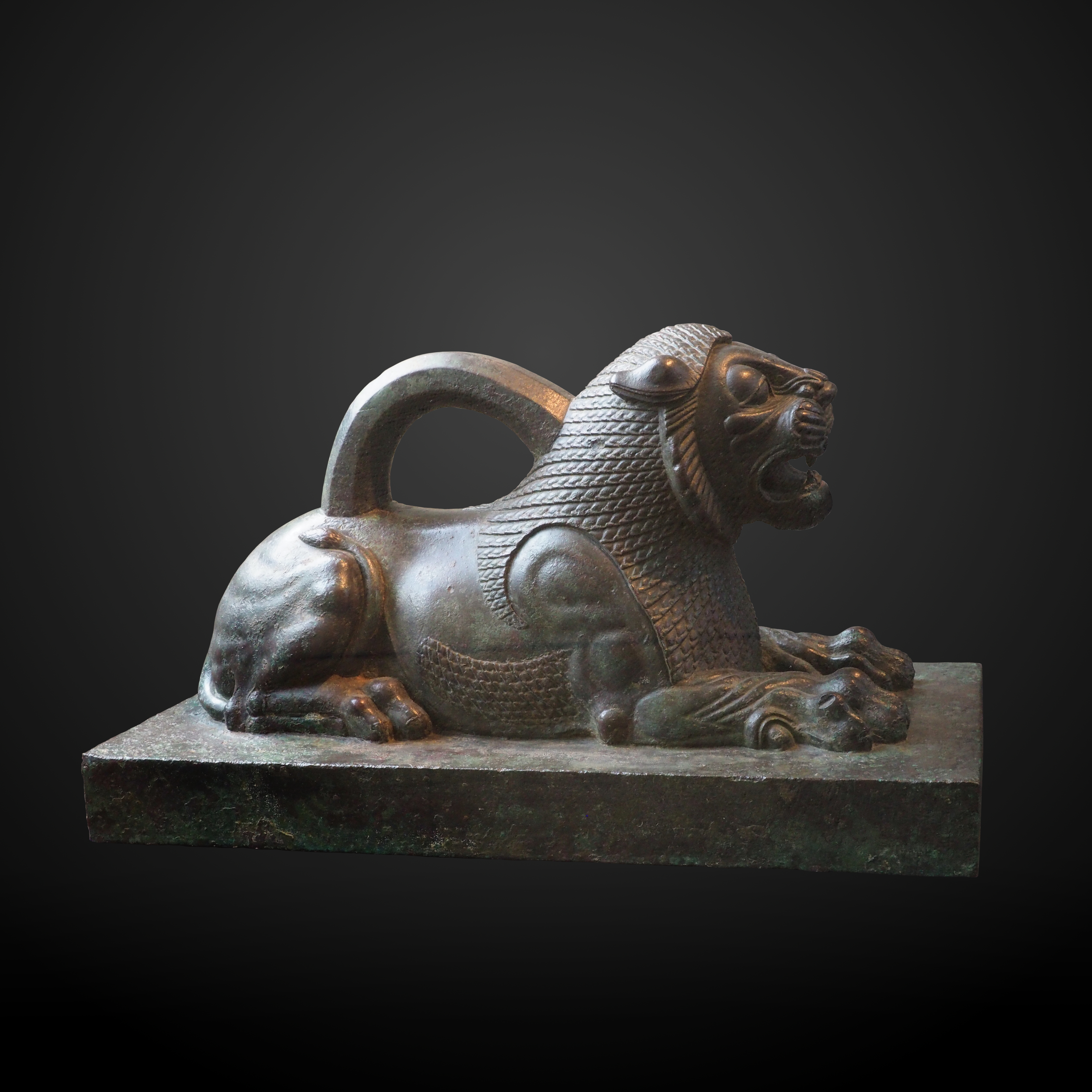
Achaemenid lion

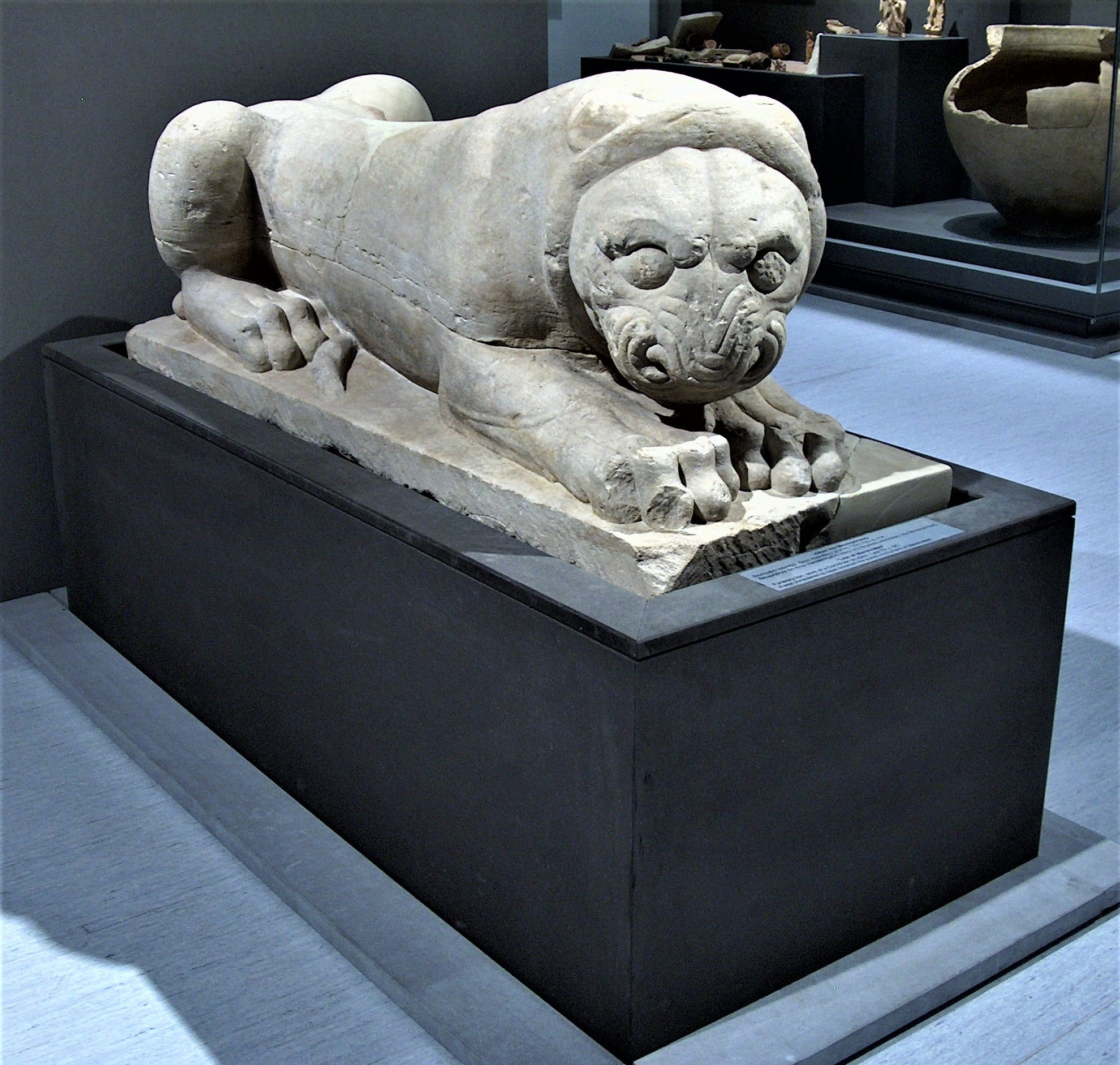
Lion of Menecrates, Greece

The sculpture of the Masarh lion, found near the Maurya capital of Pataliputra, raises the question of the Achaemenid and Greek influence on the art of the Maurya Empire, and on the western origins of stone carving in India. The lion is carved in Chunar sandstone, like the Pillars of Ashoka, and its finish is polished, a feature of the Maurya sculpture. According to S.P. Gupta, the sculptural style is unquestionably Achaemenid. This is particularly the case for the well-ordered tubular representation of whiskers (vibrissas) and the geometrical representation of inflated veins flush with the entire face. The mane, on the other hand, with tufts of hair represented in wavelets, is rather naturalistic. Very similar examples are however known in Greece and Persepolis. It is possible that this sculpture was made by an Achaemenid or Greek sculptor in India and either remained without effect, or was the Indian imitation of a Greek or Achaemenid model, somewhere between the fifth century BCE and the first century BCE, although it is generally dated from the time of the Maurya Empire, around the 3rd century BCE.

== See also ==
- Architecture of Karnataka
- Architecture of Kerala
- Architecture of Tamil Nadu
- Badami cave temples
- Hemadpanthi
- Indian vernacular architecture
- Kalinga Architecture
- List of Indian architects
- Meitei architecture
- Rajasthani architecture
- Temples of North Karnataka

Other Indian art and architecture forms

- Indian art
- Indo-Greek art
- Art of Mathura
- Gupta art
- Mauryan art
- Kushan art
- Hoysala architecture
- Vijayanagara architecture
- Greco-Buddhist art
- Chola art and architecture
- Pallava art and architecture
- Badami Chalukya architecture
