= History of Raigad district =

This article details the history of Raigad district. Raigad District is a district in the Indian state of Maharashtra. It is located in the Konkan region. The Kulaba district was renamed after Raigad, the fort which was the former capital of the Maratha ruler Chatrapati Shivaji Maharaj. The fort is surrounded by dense forest in the interior regions of the district, on a west-facing spur of the Western Ghats of Sahyadri range. The name was changed during the regime of Chief Minister A. R. Antulay on 1 January 1981.

== Early history ==
Kolaba Ports of Ceul, Mahad Chodeganv and Rajpuri in Janjira were probably centres of trade from the earliest historical times (B. C. 225). The trade-in those times must have been through the openings of the Sahyadris by the Bor, Devasthali, Kumbha and Sevtya passes. It is probable that at that time the entire Kolaba coast was ruled by a power which had its sway over both the Konkan and the Deccan and trade in the ports mentioned above shrank from foreign commerce to local traffic when Kolaba became part of Gujarat ruled by a local Chief. From the days of the 1st century after Christ, Buddhist caves have been located in Ceul, Pal and Kol near Mahad as well as Kuda near Rajpuri. Along with these historical places, Ghodeganv may also be mentioned as a centre of trade. Ptolemy's Simulla or Timula (A. D. 150) and possibly Pliny's Perimula (A. D. 77) are identical with Cemulla or Ceul. The earliest Hindu reference to this Cemulla (i.e., Ceul) is found in two Kanheri cave inscriptions of the beginning of the 2nd century after Christ.

=== Local Rulers ===
Among the twenty-eight inscriptions found at the Kuda Caves so far, five record gifts by connections of Khandapalita, the Mahabhoja, the Chief of Mandava, who probably belonged to a local dynasty with its capital at Mandad about a mile north of Kuda. Similarly, an inscription in the Pale Caves contains a reference to a Prince of a Kamboja dynasty as ruling somewhere in Kolaba at about the same time. It is not certain whether these local dynasties were independent or subordinate to the Satavahanas, who at this time had their capital at Paithan near Ahmadnagar and at Kolhapur.

=== Kshatrapas ===
The Kusana emperor Kaniska I extended his power over Central and Western India at about the end of the 1st century A. D. Ksaharata Bhumaka is the earlier known Ksatrapa who was put in charge of the south-western part of the empire of the Kusanas of Kaniska's house. This Ksatrapa Bhumaka was succeeded by Nahapana who flourished about the period 60 CE. Jain Works are unanimous in that Nahapana ruled Ujjain for 40 years while the inscriptions made by Ushavadata evince that Nahapana ruled for 46 years. Thus, Nahapana must have captured Ujjain in his 6th regnal year. Periplus of 60 CE evince that Nahapana was ruling Ujjain, thus fixing his regnal period from around 54 CE to 100 CE. In the earlier records Nahapana is called Ksatrapa although his precise relation with Bhuumaka is not known. On the coins. Nahapana is invariably called Rajan, a title which probably indicates that he assumed independence. During his reign, Rsabhadatta, his son-in-law, extended his sway over the northern part of Konkan. In about AD 125 the Satavahana King Gautamiputra Satakarni defeated Nahapana and annexed the southern provinces of the Ksaharata dominion. In the inscriptions found in caves at Naneghat (near Junnar), this king is described as 'Khakharatvamsaniravsesakala', i.e, the person who uprooted the entire family of Ksatrapas and 'Sakayavanapallavanisudana.', i.e, the destroyer of Sakas, Yavanas and Pallavas.

=== Kardamakas ===
After the overthrow of Nahapana, the Scythian family of the Kardamakas established its authority in Western India under Castana, the son of Yasamotika. Inscriptions discovered at Andhan in Kaccha evince that in the Saka year 52 (A. D. 130-31) Raja Castana was ruling jointly with his grandson Rudradaman. Castana was the Mahaksatrapa and Rudradaman, the Ksatrapa. There is evidence to show that the Sakas under Rudradaman succeeded in defeating the Satavahana king and thereby, recovering most of the northern districts of the dominions of Satakarni originally conquered from Nahapana. Junagad inscription of Rudradaman speaks of him as the lord of many countries including Akora, Avanti, Anupa, Aparanta, Saurastra and Anarta (i.e, Dvaraka in Kathiavad). Most of these were conquered from Gautamiputra when Rudradaman was probably a Ksatrapa under his grandfather.

Rudradaman came to the throne sometime after AD 130. We know much about the reign of this powerful ruler with the help of the important historical document in Junagad inscription dated in the Saka year 72 (A. D. 150-51). The subject for the prasasti here is the reconstruction of the dam of the Sudarsana lake which during his time was wiped away by a terrible cyclone. Rudradaman's rule appears to have extended over the whole of the Ksaharata dominions with the only exception of Nasik and Poona districts. Besides being a great conqueror and administrator, he was a great patron of Sanskrit literature. In his reign and due to his influence Kardamakas entered into matrimonial alliances with the families of Satavahanas of Daksinapatha, of the Iksvakus of Andhrapatha and also of the Licchhavis of Vaisali. Successors of Rudradaman were, however, unable to retain their hold on the province of Aparanta probably on account of the pressure of Satavahanas at the end of the 2nd century AD.

=== Satavahanas ===
Satavahanas came to power in trans-Vindhyan India during the 1st century B. C. Kings of this illustrious family were styled as Lords of Daksinapatha. According to Indian literary tradition, the Satavahanas had their capital at Pratisthana now identified with modern Paithan on the Godavari in Aurangabad district, Maharashtra. Ptolemy's Geography also confirms this view. Puranas use the expression Andhrabhrtya in case of the members of this family. This has given rise to a controversy. (Bharatiya Vidya Bhavan).] among scholars. In this connection, it can be pointed out that Satavahana might be the name of kula or family; while Andhra can be considered to be the name of a jati or a tribe.

==== Simuka and his successors ====
The chronology of the Satavahanas has also been a matter of dispute. According to Pauranic passages, Simuka, the founder of this dynasty, distinguished himself by overthrowing Susarman, the last of the Kanva kings who ruled for 45 years, after extirpating the last Shunga king Devabhuti. On this basis, Simuka can be assigned to the 1st century B. C. which is also confirmed by the palaeography of the Naneghat, Nasik, Sanci and Hathigumpha inscriptions referring to Simuka as well as his immediate successors, namely, Krsna and Satakarni. Both of these are known through inscriptions. The Hathigurhpha inscription shows that Satakarni I must have exercised his sway over a large empire. It probably included Northern Konkan and also Kathiavad. The Naneghat inscription speaks of Nayanika, the wife of this king claiming to have celebrated numerous Vedic sacrifices. Here a mention has been made of her. sons Vedisri and Saktisri also. Elder Saraganus noted in Periplus of the Erythraean Sea (written between A. D. 70 and 80) probably refers to this Satakarni I. Periplus suggests that the Northern Konkan passed from Satakarni to Sandares some time about the middle of the 1st century CE. This Satakarni, appears to have been a descendant of Satakarni I. The period of about a century that intervened between Satakarni I (end of the 1st century) and that of Gautamiputra Satarkarni (beginning of the 2nd century CE) seems to have witnessed a temporary eclipse of the Satavahana power owing to the encroachment of the Sakas.

==== 106–130 CE ====
Gautamiputra Satakarni is styled as 'Saka-yavana-pallava- nisudana' and 'Satavahana-kula-yasa-pratisthapanakara'. Extirpation of the Ksaharata dynasty was his outstanding achievement. A Nasik inscription of the eighteenth year of his reign (roughly coinciding with AD 124-25) is seen recording a grant of some land that belonged to Rsabhadatta, Nahapana's son-in-law. This grant was issued from a "Victorious camp of the army that was gaining success", and the king at that time was stationed at a place called Benakataka in the Govardhana (Nasik) district. On the strength of this inscription, it is possible to say that the direct rule of this king extended over the whole land from the Krsna in the south to Malva and Kathiavad in the north and from Berar in the east to the Konkan in the west. Last epigraphic record of this king which belongs to the twenty-fourth year of his reign was issued jointly by him along with his mother Gautami Balasri who is styled as one, "whose son is living". Soon after this charter being issued, the king seems to have died and was succeeded by his son Vasisthaputra Pulumavi (the name is written as Pulumayi). Hence the reign of this king can be roughly assigned to the period A. D. 106–130. Before his death, this king had lost some of the districts that he had conquered from Nahapana to another Scythian dynasty of the Kardamakas, already referred to above.

Among the successors of this illustrious king, Yajnasri Satakarni or better Yajna Satakarni (A. D. 174–203) deserves mention. This king is known from inscriptions at Nasik (seventh year of his reign), Kanheri (16th year of the rule) and Cinna-Ganjan in the Krsna district (27th year of his reign). Silver coins of this king found at Sopara (Ancient Surparaka, the capital of Aparanta) have the head of the king on the obverse; while the reverse type is a combination of the Ujjain and hill symbols with the rayed Sun, a constant feature of the coins of the Sakas of Western India. Yajna, by far, was the last great king of the family, who succeeded in ousting Sakas; but soon after his death, the decline of the Satavahanas started and the empire appears to have been split up into a number of separate units under different princes of the royal blood.

=== Ptolemy, 150 CE ===
From the days of the geographer Ptolemy (135–150 CE) Konkan, the part of the west coast, is known to the Greeks. Information about Western India was supplied to this geographer by Greeks, who had known Symulla, probably Ceul, as one of the trading centres. Ptolemy's account of India suffers from the confusion due to his mistaken idea of the Indian coast stretching (according to him) east and west instead of north and south. In his division of Ariake, i.e, the Maratha country, he refers to Sadan's Ariake (a word of doubtful meaning) or the north Konkan and Pirate Ariake or the south Konkan. He mentions three places in Kolaba; the cape and mart of Symulla (i.e, Ceul), Hippokura, south of Symulla and Balepatna not far from Hippokura. These three can be identified respectively with the south point of Bombay Harbour and the mart of modern Ceul, Goreganv or Ghodeganv six miles south of Manganv and modern Mahad respectively. Details about the trade of the Greeks attracted towards the emporium of Symulla or Ceul are, however, not available from Ptolemy.

=== Periplus ===
The author of Periplus of the Erythraean Sea (70 and 80 AD) mentions Sopara (Ouppara), Kalyan (Kalliena), Ceul (Semulla) and Palpattan or Pal near Mahad (Palaiptama). Direct commerce with Egypt in articles of food, sesame, oil, etc, at this time, appears to have declined from the Konkan ports; yet considerable trade was carried on. During the 2nd and 3rd centuries places from Kolaba like Ceul were thus famous centres of trade. Satakarni's rule over Konkan only confirms this.

=== Vakatakas of Vatsagulma, 300–500 ===
Vakatakas held sway over many parts of the Deccan after the fall of Satavahanas and before the rise of Chalukyas in the middle of the 6th century. Vindhyasakti, the founder of this dynasty, is mentioned in the Ajintha inscription of the time of Harisena. Unfortunately not much is known about the precise extent of Vindhyasakati's dominion. His own Maharaja Haritiputra Pravarasena I, described as samrat in some records, distinguished himself by performing various sacrifices like Agnistoma, Atiratra, Vajapeya, etc. The earliest epigraphic record of these Vakatakas of Vatsagulma occurs in the Basim grant of Dharma-Maharaja Vindhyasakti II, the great-grandson of Vindyasakti I, grandson of Pravarsena I and the son of Dharma-Maharaja Sarvasena. According to the Ajintha inscription he secured a victory over the king of Kuntala about the middle of the 4th century. The son of this king, Devasena is referred to in glowing terms in the inscription mentioned above. Devasena's son Harisena was one Of the most powerful rulers of his time. He, as is read in Ajintha record, spread his influence in many countries like Kuntala, Kosala including Trikuta, i.e, Traikutaka territories, about the Northern Konkan. The Ajintha inscription was caused to be incised by Varahadeva, a saciva of this king. Vakatakas were lovers of learning and great patrons of art and literature.

=== Mauryas and Nalas,500–600 ===
During the 6th century, Raigad district along with the Northern Konkan coast was probably ruled by Mauryas and Nala Chiefs as Kirtivarman (550–567), the first of the Chalukyas who conquered Konkan is described as the night of death to the Nalas and Mauryas. From an inscribed stone of the 5th and the 6th century (brought from Vada in Thana), it appears that a Maurya King Suketuvarman was then ruling in Konkan. More is a name quite common among Marathas, Kunbis and Rolls of Kolaba. Probably here can be traced the name Maurya. Two small landing places of the name of More in Elephanta and in Karanja can be taken as relics of the Maurya power formerly existing in Konkan.

The Rithapur copper plate inscription records the grant of a village called Kadambagiri by Maharaja Bhavattavarman while he had gone on a pilgrimage to Prayag. This copper plate, according to experts, is assigned to the first half of the 6th century. The name Bhavattavarman is probably a Prakrtised form of Bhavadattavaraman who is called Nala-nrpa-vamsa-prasuta. The expression Mahesvarmanhasenatisra-rajya-vibhava used in the case of this king indicates that he had obtained royal fortune through the grace of Mahesvara (Siva) and Mahasena (Skanda-Kartikeya). The king's banner bore the tri-pataka. Although the charter is dated in the king's eleventh regnal year, the grant, however, is said to have been made for the spiritual benefit of his own parents by Maharaja Arthapati-bhattaraka, now taken to be the grandson of Bhavadattavarman. A Nala inscription recently discovered in the Umarkot thana, old Jaypore State, Orissa records a grant made by Maharaja Arthapati-bhattaraka. The father of this Arthapati was probably one Skandavarman (the name is doubtful due to the reading which is not clear) described as the son of Bhavadatta of the Nala family (identical with Bhavattavarman referred to above). This is known from Nala inscription in verse found at Podagadh in the old Jaypore State not far from the borders of the old Bastar State. Another trace of these Nalas occurs in the local story of Nala Raja who married his daughter to the Malahg or Arab devotee, who gave his name to Malahggad hill. Epigraphic and numismatic materials indicate that originally the territories of Nalas were in Bastar-Jaypore region. In the first half of the 6th century, they extended their power at the expense of the Vakatakas. Thus these Maurya and Nala kings retained Konkan under their control even after the Chalukya king Kirtivarman; until finally Konkan was conquered by Pulakeshin II (610–640), the grandson of Kirtivarman who describes his general Candadanda as a great wave which drove before it the watery stores of the pools, which are the Mauryas.

After having made his position secure at home, Pulakeshin II launched on a career of conquest for the subjugation of his neighbours. A graphic account of his victories is given in the Aihole prasasti, composed by the Jain poet "Ravikirti", who claimed equality of fame with Bharavi and Kalidasa, at the completion of a shrine of Jinendra in A. D. 634-35. In the south Pulakeshin II besieged and reduced Vanavasi, the capital of the Kadambas who had been formerly subdued by his father. Then the Gangas of South Mysore and the Alupas, who are supposed to have ruled at Humca in Shimoga district of Mysore, were compelled to submit, probably because they were allies of the Kadambas. After the struggle, the Ganga king Durvinita Konganivrddha son of Avinitakongani, appears to have given one of his daughters in marriage to the Chalukya conqueror. The Mauryas of the Konkan, previously subdued by his father, were overwhelmed and the city of Puri (either Gharapuri, i.e, the island of Elephanta near Bombay, or Rajpuri near Janjira), which was located in the Arabian Sea and was probably the Maurya capital, was invaded by Pulakeshin's battleships and was captured. Further to the north the Latas, Malavas and Gurjaras were subdued. Pulakeshin's success in the Gujarat region is indicated by the establishment of a Chalukya viceroy. The Kaira grant issued from Vijayapura in A. D. 643 by the Chalukya Raja Vijayaraja or Vijayavarmaraja, son of Raja Buddhavarmaraja surnamed Vallabharanavikranta, and grandson of Jayasimha, records the grant of the village of Pariyaya (Pariya in Surat district) to the priests and religious students of Jambusaras (Jambusar in the Varuch district). The Bagumra (old Baroda State) grant of the Sendraka Chief Prthivi-vallabha Nikumbhallasakti (son of Adityasakti and grandson of Bhanusakti), dated AD 655 and recording a gift of land in the Treyannahara visaya (district round Ten near Bardoli), shows that the Chalukyas were succeeded in the viceroyalty of the Gujarat region by the Sendrakas related to Pulakeshin's mother. The non-mention of the overlord in both the records is probably due to the temporary eclipse of the Badami house after Pulakeshin's death in 642.

=== Traikutakas ===
A reference to Traikutakas is also opportune in the history of Kolaba. These kings derived their family name from the Trikuta hill in Aparanta, i.e, Northern Konkan. One of the Traikutaka kings is actually described as ruling over Aparanta. Coins of these kings have been found in Southern Gujarat, Konkan as well as Maratha countries on the other side of Ghats. These kings used the era of A. D. 248-49, which probably speaks of their relation with Abhiras or Ahirs. The Candravalli inscription refers to the separate conflict of Abhiras as well as Traikutakas with the Kadamba king Mayurasarman who ruled about the middle of the 4th century. Kalidasa's Raghuvamsa written in the 4th or 5th century contains a veiled reference to the Traikutaka kingdom of Aparanta. Indradatta, his son Daharasena (at times Daharangana) and the latter's son Vyaghrasena (at times Vyaghragana) are three Traikutaka Maharajas who ruled in 5th century A. D. as is evinced by epigraphic as well as numismatic evidence. Among the Maharaja Daharasena's copper plate grant is issued from the victory camp at Amraka and is dated in the year 207 (455 A. D.). This was found at Pardi about 50 miles from Surat. This king appears to have performed Asvamedha sacrifice. Surat grant of his son, Vyaghrasena was issued from Aniruddhapura in the year 241, i.e, 489 A. D. He, like his father, was a Vaisnava and is described as the Lord of Aparanta. The Traikutakas were always at war with Mauryas; and both of them had to accept the supremacy of Kalachuris in the second half of the 6th century. The Kalachuris, however, were subdued by the Chalukyas of Badami of the 6th century. Thus the Chalukya king Mangalesha (597-98 to 610–11) claims to have put to flight Buddharaja, the son of Kalachuri Sankaragana.

Kirtivarman I died in 597-98, probably leaving several minor children, and the throne, therefore, passed to his younger brother or step-brother Mangalesha (A. D. 597-98 to 610–11), also known as Mahgalisa (sic), Mahgalaraja, and Mahgalisvara. The new king enjoyed the virudas Rana-vikranta and Uru-rana-vikranta, besides Prthivivallabha or Sri-prthivivallabha. Mangalesha has been described as a Paramabhagavata, i.e, devout worshipper of the Bhagavat (Visnu). The victory over the Katachhuris (Kalachuris) and the conquest of Revatidvipa, referred to in the Aihole inscription and echoed in the Kauthem grant, were his greatest e achievements. According to the Nerur grant and Mahakuta pillar inscription, the Kalachuri king Buddha, son of Sankaragana, was defeated before the 12th of April, A. D. 602, and his entire possessions were appropriated, when the Chalukya king was desirous of conquering the northern region. Buddharaja was in possession of Nasik district as late as AD 608. The struggle between the Chalukyas and Kalachuris, therefore, appears to have continued for some years, after which the former came into complete possession of the central and northern Maratha country. The Nerur grant of Mangalesha also refers to the killing of the Chalukya Chief Svamiraja who was apparently ruling in the Konkan and was said to have been famous for his victories in eighteen battles. Most probably this Svamiraja was placed in the Konkan by Kirtivarman I as his viceroy; and he sided with Pulakeshin II in his struggle against Mangalesha. It is also not unlikely that Svamiraja had his headquarters at Revatldvipa in the waters of the Western or Arabian Sea (i.e, the fortified promontory of Redi to the south of Vengurla in the Ratnagiri district), which is said to have been conquered by Mangalesha, and that the conqueror appointed Indravarman of the Bappura (i.e, Batpura) lineage, apparently related to his own mother, as the new Governor of the region. According to a Goa grant, Satyashraya-Dhruvaraja-Indravarman was ruling four visayas or mandalas with his headquarters at Revatldvipa in January 610 or 611 A. D, which was the twentieth year of his government, and granted a village in the Khetahara desa (Khed taluka in the Ratnagiri district) with the permission of the Chalukya emperor of Badami. It is usually believed that Indravarman was placed as a viceroy in the Konkan by Kirtivarman I about A. D. 590, the first year of the former's rule according to the Goa grant. But possibly he was ruling as a subordinate ruler elsewhere and was stationed at Revatldvipa only after the conquest of that place by Mangalesha sometime after A. D. 597-98. It was as a result of the difficult days through which the Chalukya emperor was passing about this time that he appears to have become bold enough to issue the charter, dated in his own regnal year.

About the end of Mangalesha's reign there was a civil war between him and his nephew Pulakeshin II, son of Kirtivarman. The cause of the quarrel, according to the Aihole inscription of Pulakeshin II, was Mangalesha's attempt to secure the succession for his own son. As a result of this war Mangalesha lost his life and the throne of Badami passed to Pulakeshin II. The son of Mangalesha, not mentioned by name in the Aihole epigraph, is usually identified with Satyashraya-Dhruvaraja-Indravarman of the Goa grant. But even though his title "an ornament of the original great Bappura (Batpura) lineage" may be explained by the suggestion that his mother was a Bappura princess, the fact that Indravarman acknowledged in January AD 610 or 611 the supremacy of Maharaja Sri-prthivi-vallabha, identified with Pulakeshin II, renders the theory unlikely; because Pulakeshin II could have hardly allowed his inveterate enemy and rival to the throne to be kept in the important position of the viceroy of the Konkan districts. As, however, Pulakeshin's first regnal year corresponds to Saka 532 (expired) while the date of the Goa grant is Saka 532 (current or expired) the identification of Maharaja Sriprthivi-vallabha, overlord of Satyashraya-Dhruvaraja-Indravarman, with Mangalesha is not beyond the bounds of possibility. The victory of Chalukyas was completed in the clays of the celebrated Pulakeshin II who came to power after Mangalesha.

=== Shilaharas, 765–1260 ===
History of Raigad district during the 7th century is still wrapped up in obscurity. We only know that Hiuen-Tsang (640 AD) mentions Cimolo which is the same as Ceul. During the latter half of the 8th century Silaharas rose to power in Konkan and the rule of the branches of this family continued up to the 13th century with only temporary interruptions. Now history informs us that three Silahara houses ruled in Western India. The oldest, out of these, ruled over Southern Konkan from 765 to 920. Silaharas of Northern Konkan popularly known as Silaharas of Thana rose to eminence at about 800 AD. and ruled for a period of four centuries. The third branch was mostly ruling the territories now included in Satara and Belganv districts as well as those in the former Kolhapur State. This house, which rose in prominence at the end of the 10th century, did not extend the sphere of its influence over Kohkan or Kolaba.

All along, Silaharas were feudatories in status. They owed their allegiance first to the Rastrakutas, then to Chalukyas as well as Kadambas and finally to the Yadavas of Devgiri. Rulers of these houses claim to have descended from Jimutavahana. Jimuta vahana, according to the traditional story, offered himself as ahara or food for Garuda on the Sila fixed for the purpose, for saving the life of the serpent Sankhacuda. Hence the descendants came to be known as Silaharas. This explanation is curious and unable to convince historians. Probably the original name was a Prakrt one like Selara and the change was made with a view to giving antiquity to it and connect it with the Pauranic hero, i.e, Jimutavahana. Silaharas of Thana and Kolhapur style themselves as tagarapuravaradhisvara and have the common garudalanchana. The identity of tagarapura still remains a matter of conjecture. Fleet's view that ancient tagara is the same as Ter about 95 miles south-east of Paithan appeared to be the near-most approach to truth. The fact that tagara is the home of Silaharas is proved on the strength of the Karakandacariu of Kanakamaramum published by Prof. Hiralal Jain. The relation of the three branches of Silaharas remains a moot question.

==== Shilaharas of South Konkan, 765–1015 ====
History of this house is known through one record, namely, the Kharepatan plates of Rattaraja [Epigraphica Indica, III, p. 292.] issued in 1008 AD. Rattaraja was the last ruler of this dynasty. The document is extremely important as it not only gives the genealogy of the ten ancestors of Rattaraja, but mentions their specific exploits also. The date of the founder can be inferred from the fact that he was feudatory of the Rastrakuta emperor Krsna I (758 to 773 AD). By 765 AD Krsna I had established his power over Konkan and it was probably handed over to Sanaphulla, the founder of this dynasty. Allowing 25 years for each reign, as is the custom, the Chronology would be as follows:-

Sanaphulla (765 to 795) Dhammayira (795 to 820) Aiyaparaja (820 to 845) Avasara I (845 to 870) Adityavarman (870 to 895) Avasara II (895 to 920) Indraraja (920 to 945) Bhima (945 to 970) Avasara III (970 to 995) Rattaraja (995 to 1020)

Soon after the issue of the plates (referred to above) in 1008 A. D, the rule of Konkan passed over to the later Chalukyas.

The Kharepatan plates declare that the founder, namely, Sanaphulla obtained lordship over the territory between Sahya mountain and the sea through the favour of Krsnaraja. Sana-phulla's son Dhammayira is known to have built a fort at Vallipattana on the Western Coast. Aiyaparaja secured victory at Candrapuri, i.e, Candor near Goa. The reign of Avasara I proved to be uneventful. His son Adityavarman, described to be as brilliant as the Sun in valour, became known on account of the help offered to the kings of Candrapuri (modern Goa) and Cemulya (modern Ceul), 30 miles to the south of Bombay. This shows that the rule of Silaharas had spread over the whole of Konkan. At this time, Laghu Kapardi the ruler of the Thana branch, was just a boy and hence the help given to the feudatory ruler of Ceul must have been at his expense. Avasara II only continued the policy of his father. Indraraja's son Bhima is styled as 'rahuvadgrasta candramandala' because he overthrew the petty ruler of Candor. At this time the Kadamba ruler Sasthadeva and his son Caturbhuja were trying to overthrow the Rastrakuta rule. This explains Bhima's opposition to Candrapuri or Candor. Avasara III, no doubt, ruled in troubled times, but had no contribution of his to make. Finally, Rattaraja, loyal to the Rastrakutas, was compelled to transfer his allegiance to Taila II.

==== Northern Konkan 800–1240 ====
Regarding this branch, sufficient historical evidence is available. In addition to five copper plates and six stone inscriptions already published, there are a dozen inscriptions that refer to rulers of this branch. Thana was the capital of these feudatories. Hence they are known as Silaharas of Thana.

Founder of this house was Kapardi, one of the most valiant lieutenants of the Rastrakuta emperor Govinda III (794 to 813 A. D.) in many a battle. Govinda, therefore, rewarded him with rulership over Northern Konkan. Kharepatan plate of Anantadev (1095 A. D.) described him as "a daring hero like Sahasanka". Kanheri inscription, dated 843 A. D. speaks of Pulasakti, his son, having obtained lordship over Konkan through Rastrakuta Amoghavarsa's favour; but it appears to be more customary than real. Originally the grant was made to Kapardi who ruled from 800 to 825 A. D. Description of Pulasakti's exploits in Kanheri plates is conventional. Kapardi II (850 to 880 AD) is more known as Laghu-Kapardi. Thana plate of Arikesarin speaks of the fact that the enemies of Laghu-Kapardi were afraid of him in childhood also. This is more conventional than real. Two records of this king only tell us that he was a feudatory of Amoghavarsa I. It is in the reign of this king that Silaharas of the south spread their influence over Goa. It may be mentioned here that Kapardi II submitted to the Kalachuri ruler Kokalla. His son Vappuvanna was not an able ruler. But Vappuvanna's eldest son Jhanja (910 to 930) is known to be the ruler of Samur or Ceul from the statement of the Arab historian Al Masudi in 916 Kharepatan plates inform that this king built 12 Siva temples. Sangamner plates of this king were, however, issued in 1000. His younger brother Goggi (930 to 945) is compared with Drona and Bhishma in the Kharepatan plates; but no exploit of his is mentioned. His son Vajjada I (945 to 975) remained loyal to the Rastrakutas even though the empire was overthrown in 973.

Bhadan copper plate grant of Aparajita Mrganka (975 to 1010) issued in 997 speaks of his rule over the whole of Konkan which comprised Thana and Kolaba districts. In these plates, this king expresses sorrow for the overthrow of the Rastrakuta empire, but does not accept the supremacy of the Chalukyas. Samantadhipati is his title. A verse in the Kharepatan plates of Anantadeva (in 1095) refers to the help that this Aparajita gave to a ruler named Gomma as well as to the fact that he enabled Aiyapadeva to retain his kingdom. This verse also refers to the fact that this Aparajita granted protection to king Bhillama II, a scion of the Yadava family. The statement in Navasahasankacaritam that Paramara received help from a king of Vidyadharas confirms this. As Paramaras were avowed enemies of Chalukyas and as these Silaharas bad only unwillingly accepted the supremacy of Chalukyas, this is probable. We know of Salyasraya, the successor of Taila to have launched an attack on Aparajita soon after the retirement of Colas. It is, here, pertinent to remember, that the Canarese Ranna claims that Satyashraya routed the lord of Konkan. He speaks of Aparajita, i.e, king of Konkan as 'Hemmed in by ocean on one side and Satyashraya routed the lord of Konkan. He speaks of Aparajita, poetic exaggeration; nevertheless, it is safe to assume that Aparajita was defeated by Satyashraya. Soon after this, Aparajita died.

The assumption that there was a war of succession between the two sons of Aparajita, viz, Vajjada II and Arikesarin, is based on the ambiguous words used in Bhandup plates. Other documents, however, do not support it. The eulogy of Vajjada II (1010 to 1015 A. D.) and the statement that Arikesarin was his younger brother, made in Thana plates of Arikesarin go against this, it is sometimes argued that Sindhuraja's intervention in Konkan was intended to establish the legitimate heir, viz, Arikesarin to the throne, but the argument does not hold much water. The fact that Vajjada's son succeeded Arikesarin also belies any war of succession. It is true that Vajjada's reign was very short. A queen of the Kadamba King Chattadeva by name Kundaladcvi is known to be the daughter of King Vacchaya of Thani (i.e, Thana) Now as Chattadeva's rule is assigned to the period from 980 to 1031 A. D, it is possible to identify Vacchaya with this Vajjada II. It is probable that Arikesarin (1015 to 1025 A. D.) might have been a regent of Cittaraja, i.e, Vajjada's son who was just a child at the time. Arikesarin had to work against heavy odds. The acceptance of the Chalukya supremacy on the part of his father had estranged Paramara King Bhoja who consequently attacked northern Konkan as Bhoja is described as the Lord of Konkan (Konkanadhipati) in Bansvara plates issued on 3 January 1020 A. D. as well as in Betma plates issued in September 1020 A. D. In 1024 A. D. (Miraj plates) Chalukya King Jayasimha II is reported to be ready to march against Northern Konkan, but whether he succeeded in subduing Arikesarin or Cittaraja is uncertain.

In the reign of Cittaraja (1025 to 1040 A. D.), clouds began to gather over Silahara supremacy due to the Kadaihbas of Goa. Kadamba King Sasthadeva II claims to have conquered both southern and northern Konkan. It appears that Cittaraja succeeded in retaining Northern Konkan because he accepted Kadamba supremacy. The attack of Kadambas was facilitated by King Gorika's (Silahara house of Kolhapur) invasion of Thana at this time. 'Dayadavyasana' helping the conquest of Konkan referred to in Kharepatan plates of Anantadeva, probably alludes to this war between these two Silahara houses. Cittaraja built the beautiful Siva temple at Ambarnath near Kalyan. In the days of his son Mammuni (1040 to 1070 A. D.), Kadambas were becoming extremely powerful and he was prudent enough to offer his daughter to him. It may also be mentioned that Someshvara I, the Chalukya ruler, defeated Mammuni and placed his own nominee on the throne of Northern Konkan. "How long Someshvara kept Konkan under his control cannot be determined." (The Struggle for Empire, p. 171). During his reign Ambarnath temple appears to have been repaired. Anantadeva (1070 to 1110 A. D.), the son of the elder brother of Mammuni, happened to be an ambitious ruler. His Kharepatan plates indicate that he routed the enemies of his house. This enemy possibly is Guhalla II of the Kadambas who was expelled by Anantadeva and who took the title of 'pascimasamudradhipati', i.e, 'the lord of the western ocean' and the ruler of entire Konkan with 1,400 villages. It is, however, stated in the Struggle for Empire, page 171, that the adversaries of Anantadeva were the Chalukyas. It is true that Silaharas had become weak due to the attack and victory of Gonka (1020 to 1050 A. D.) described as the 'Lord of Konkan' in his grandson's record so as to become an easy target for Kadambas; but it seems that Anantadeva defeated the Kadamba ruler Guhalladeva III (1180 A. D.) as the Kharepatan plate describes him as "Casting into the ocean of the edge of his sword those fierce heaps of sin who, at a time of misfortune due to hostility of relatives, obtained power, devastated the land of the Konkan, harassing Gods and Brahmanas.

Apararka I (1110 to 1140 A. D.) son of Anantadeva is found issuing land grants without any reference to the Kadambas in 1118–19 and 1127–28 A. D. as well as in 1129–30 A. D. and 1138–39 A. D. Hence the assumption that the Kadamba ruler Vijayaditya who styled himself as the 'torch for the jewels of the land of Konkan' had annexed the Silahara kingdom appears to have no basis. Anantadeva's Vadavalli plates issued in 1127–28 graphically describe the demon Cittuka invading the country, Apararka with a single horse and sword plunging into the battlefield and harassing the enemy to such an extent that he could neither fight nor flee and took refuge with the Mlecchas. This probably refers to the Kadamba ruler Jayakesin II (1125–1147 A. D.) who styled himself as the Lord of Southern as well as Northern Konkan. It may also be mentioned that Jayakesin strengthened his position by marrying the daughter of Vikramaditya VI, the Chalukya ruler. He ruled jointly with his queen as a subordinate of the Chalukyas. Jayakesin's success must have been a very short-lived one as another inscription of his issued only five months later fails to mention Kaverikadvipa or Northern Konkan among his dominions. Hence Vadavalli plates can be assumed as describing a fact which resulted in Apararka throwing off the Kadamba yoke. He later on is seen sending an embassy to Kasmir as is confirmed by Srikanthcarita written by Mankha in the lifetime of the Kasmir King Jayasimha who died in 1150 A. D. Colophon of Apararkatika on Yajnavalkyasmrti states that it was composed by Aparaditya, a Silahara king born in the family of Jimutavahana belonging to the Vidyadhara stock. Internal evidence shows that the author flourished between Vijnanesvara (1110 A. D.) and Devana-bhatta (1225 A. D.). Hence Aparaditya has to be identified with Aparaditya I (1110–1140 A. D.) or Aparaditya II (1170–1195 A. D.). It is more probable that he is this Aparaditya or Apararka who was introduced by Tejahkantha in Kasmir assembly through this book. Of course, whether he himself has written it or his protege has fathered his work upon him, cannot be determined at present, since Vadavalli plates are silent on this point.

The relation of Harapaladeva (1140–1155) with Apararka is not known. Bombay Gazetteer refers to three inscriptions of this King, dated 1149, 1150 and 1153 A. D. One of these from Agasi is dated Saka year 1078 Mdrgasirsa Suddha Pratipada which corresponds to 22 November 1150 A. D. Mallikarjuna (1155–1170 A. D.) is known through his Prince of Wales Museum inscription hailing from Ciplun (Saka year, 1079 Pausa Vadya Caturdasi, i.e, 2 December 1157), where his rule over Ratnagiri is spoken of. In his reign, his northern neighbour Chalukya Kumarapala of Gujarat invaded the Silahara kingdom as is known from the description of war in Kumarapalacaritam Canto VI, 47–72. Although in the first battle at Navasari in Surat district the General of Kumarapala was defeated, yet Mallikarjuna was slain in the second battle. Hence Kumarapalacaritam includes Konkan among the provinces ruled by the King Kumarapala. But Parel inscription of Mallikarjuna's successor, Aparaditya II (1170–1195 A. D.) dated 1180 A. D. describes him as 'maharajadhirajakonkan-cakra-varti'. This indicates that the Silaharas soon overthrew the Chalukya yoke. Kesiraja, the next Silahara ruler, is referred to in two unpublished inscriptions, one dated 1203 and the other dated 1238 A. D. From the latter, it is known that Kesiraja was the son of Aparaditya II. Although this king ruled for 40 years, it is clear that Yadavas of Devgiri by this time, extended their power over the Deccan and Kesiraja was forced to accept Yadava suzerainty. Last Silahara ruler was Someshvara (1240–1265 A. D.) two of whose stone inscriptions are dated 1259 A. D. and 1260 A. D. Hemadri states that the Yadava ruler Mahadeva (Saka, 1182–1193, i.e, 1260–1271 A. D.) defeated and killed the King of Konkan named Soma. Last known date of Someshvara is 1260 A. D. Hemadri's statement shows that Someshvara was first defeated on land, then took to ships and there appears to have met his death by being drowned. It is said that "even the sea did not protect him" and that "he betook himself to the submarine fire thinking the fire of Mahadeva's prowess to be more unbearable." Thus in 1273 A. D. Thana plates published by Mr. Wathen speak of a Yadava Governor ruling over the Kingdom of Silaharas. So it is clear that Konkan was annexed to the territories of the Yadavas.

Among the Silaharas of Kolhapur who ruled over Satara and Belganv districts from 1000 to 1215 A. D., Gonka deserves mention here, as he is described as the Lord of Karhad (Karad), Mairifvja (Miraj) and Konkan [Journal of the Royal Asiatic Society, Vol. IV, p. 281, Sanskrit Transcript.]. Dayadavyasana referred to in the record of Anantadeva possibly refers to Gonka's conquest of at least of portions of Northern Konkan and a part of Kolaba district. Gandaraditya of this house claims to be the undisputed King of Konkan. During his reign Apararka I of the Thana branch appears to have been temporarily ousted by Jayakesin II of Goa. A record of Vijayaditya, son of Gandaraditya states that he had restored the Lord of Sthanaka or Thana to his kingdom. It appears, therefore, that Gandaraditya had asked his son to help Apararka II, who defeated Jayakesin II in 1127 A. D. Vijayaditya (1140 to 1175 A. D.) had also helped Chalukya Paramadideva in his war with Kalachuris. In fact, he played the role of a kingmaker. His son Bhoja II (1175 to 1215 A. D.) assumed all imperial titles, but received a crushing blow from the ambitious Yadava ruler Sihghana (1210 A. D.) who is described as the "Garuda putting to flight the serpent in the form of the King Bhoja".

== Yadavas of Devgiri ==
Viceroys of the Yadavas of Devgiri, ruled over the Deccan including Konkan as well as Kolaba from the days of Sihghana (1200 to 1247) down to Ramacandra or Ramadeva (1271–1310) and his son Sankara (1311–1313). Ramacandra as is well known, was taken prisoner by Malik Kafur, the General of Ala-ud-din, in the battle at Devagiri in 1307 AD. In Saka, 1235, i.e, 1313 A. D, Malik Kafur sent again to the Deccan for subduing Tailahgana put Ramacandra's son Sahkara also to death and fixed his residence at Devagiri. The revolt of Harapala, the son-in-law of Ramcandra was suppressed finally by Mubarak, the third son of Ala-ud-din Khilji in 1317, who seized and inhumanly burnt him alive. From this time the Delhi sultanate have held ports in Kolaba. Ceul was one of such ports. It must be said in fairness to Vijayanagar or Anegundi kings that they maintained control over many parts of Kolaba up to 1377. In fact, before Musalman domination, the south Konkan including present Raigad district was under the control of a Lingayat dynasty called the Kanara gings, whose headquarters were at Anegundi. By the end of the 14th century, however, the whole of Konkan including Kolaba, came under the thumb of the Delhi sultanate.

== Formation of Kolaba district ==
Kolaba district was split from Thane district in 1869. According to the 1872 census Kolaba district had a population of just over 3,50,000 people, with 94% of the population being Hindus, and most of the remaining population being Muslims. In 1881 the population was about 382,000 with 95% of the population being Hindus.

However, at this point, the northernmost parts of modern Raigad district were retained in Thane district. Panvel, just across the bay from Mumbai was not put in Kolaba district until 1883, and Karjat, an area in the north-east corner of modern Raigad district was not placed in Kolaba until 1891.
