= Revatidvipa =

Indian province under the Chalukya dynasty

Revatidvipa on the southwestern coast of India

Revatidvipa was a province under the Chalukya dynasty, encompassing parts of modern-day Maharashtra, India. Revatidvipa was an important trading port of the dynasties that controlled it, including the Chalukyas.The city of Redi in Maharashtra was the probable ancient site of Revanti island. It was conquered by the Rashtrakuta ruler Krishna I in 753 AD.

It flourished as a maritime port with a flow of traders and foreign mercantile communities developing. The most significant community among them were the Pahlavi-speaking Christian merchants from Persis (modern-day Fars)

== History ==
The town of Gopakapattana is identified with modern-day Redi in Maharashtra.

The region was successfully ruled by the Kadambas, Bhojas, Mauryas of Konkana, Chalukyas, Rashtrakutas, Shilaharas, Kadambas of Goa and Seunas of Devagiri.

Revatidvipa was an important territory of the Mauryas of Konkan. The Chalukya ruler Kirttivarman I attacked the Konkan Mauryas with his main objective being to occupy the port of Revatidvipa. Kirttivarman I's conquest of Revatidvipa, as Nilkanta Sastri says, "would not have been realised without an efficient naval organization".

After defeating the Mauryas, Kirttivarman appears to have appointed a new governor for the former Maurya territory called Svamiraja, a prince of Chalukya ancestry who had won 18 battles.

=== Rebellion ===
Relations between Svamiraja and Mangalesha, Kirttivarman's successor, were not amicable and Svamiraja rebelled against Mangalesha. The Aihole prashasti inscription states that Mangalesha's navy, "which was like the army of the deity Varuna", conquered the island. The later Chalukya inscriptions mention that Mangalesha's troops crossed the sea by a bridge made of boats.

The Nerur inscription does not refer to the Revatidvipa, but suggests that Svamiraja was the governor of the Konkan coastal region, in which Revatidvipa was located. Subsequently, Mangalesha slew Svamiraja appointed Satyashraya Dhruvaraja Indravarman as the new governor of the Konkan region, a member of the Batpura or Bappura family.
