= Comunidades of Goa =

The comunidades of Goa are a form of land association developed in Goa, India, where land-ownership is collectively held, but controlled by the male descendants of those who claimed to be the founders of the village, who in turn mostly belonged to upper caste groups. Documented by the Portuguese as of 1526, it was the predominant form of landholding in Goa prior to 1961. In form, it is similar to many other rural agricultural peoples' form of landholding, such as that of pre-Spanish Bolivia and the Puebloan peoples now in the Southwestern United States, identified by Karl Marx as the dualism of rural communities: the existence of collective land ownership together with private production on the land.

== Codified by the Portuguese ==
Comunidades are a variant of the system of gaunkari system called gramasanstha (ग्रामसंस्था)). Some scholars argue that the term gaunkari is derived from the name for those who compose it, that is the gaunkar; i.e. those who make (kar) the gaun or village. This institution pre-existed the arrival of the Portuguese, but was codified by them. The first of these codifications was contained in the Foral of Afonso Mexia in 1526. The term gram in gramasanstha refers to the village. Comunidades is the Portuguese word for "communities". The khazan system of managed wetlands in Goa is an offshoot of the gaunkari system, but now quite distinct from the comunidades.

== Members and dividends ==
Members of the comunidades are called gaonkars, or zonnkars (in Portuguese, jonoeiros). The former are the members of the village, the latter were entitled to zonn, or jono, which is a dividend paid by the comunidade to gaunkars and accionistas, the holders of acções (sing. acção), or shares. The system applies equally to agricultural land and to village housing.

== Changes over time ==
Over time and subject to conflicting land ownership and administration systems, the old institutions lost their original characteristics and comunidades are now mere societies of rights-holders who are members by birth.

After Portuguese rule ended in Goa in 1961, the village development activities, which were once the preserve of the comunidades or more specifically the gaunkaris, became entrusted to the gram panchayat, rendering the gaunkaris non-functional.

The emergence of private property in land created a new set of socio-economic relationships at the village level, especially the comunidades and the ghar-bhaatt, the two principal forms of land tenure that came to characterise Portuguese Goa.

The working of the comunidades is now tightly controlled by the Goa state government, which supporters of the comunidade movement say leaves little scope for them to act as self-governing units.

== Limited role ==
The sole official function of the comunidades, currently, is to parcel out their land at government-approved rates. However, supporters of the comunidade movement, have been waging a determined, if small, campaign to safeguard what they see as their rights, and continue to fight against the erosion of the comunidade system in Goa, by, for example, bringing land ownership lawsuits. In 2004, the Goa Su-Ray Party issued a polemic supporting the comunidades.

The Goa Daman and Diu Agricultural Tenancy Act, 1964, passed in the 1964 by the then Maharashtrawadi Gomantak Party government, extended the tenancy rights of the tenants to lands from the comunidade, for the payment of a quit-rent called the comunidade foro. This has resulted in most field property of the comunidades passing into private hands, and erosion of the comunidades as a whole.

Thus at present most of comunidade land is in the hills, which is either uncultivated or given over to cashew plantations, to tenants. Uncultivated comunidade land draws squatters who develop shanty towns.

In the populous and well-developed central coastal parts of the state, almost all the land that once belonged to the comunidades has been allotted to tenants or taken over for industrial purpose by the government.

There are provisions under the Code of Comunidade (a Legislative Enactment No. 2070 dated 15 April 1961) to take action against illegal encroachments; however, action is usually not taken.
