= Archaeological Museum, Vijayapura =

Museum in Karnataka, India

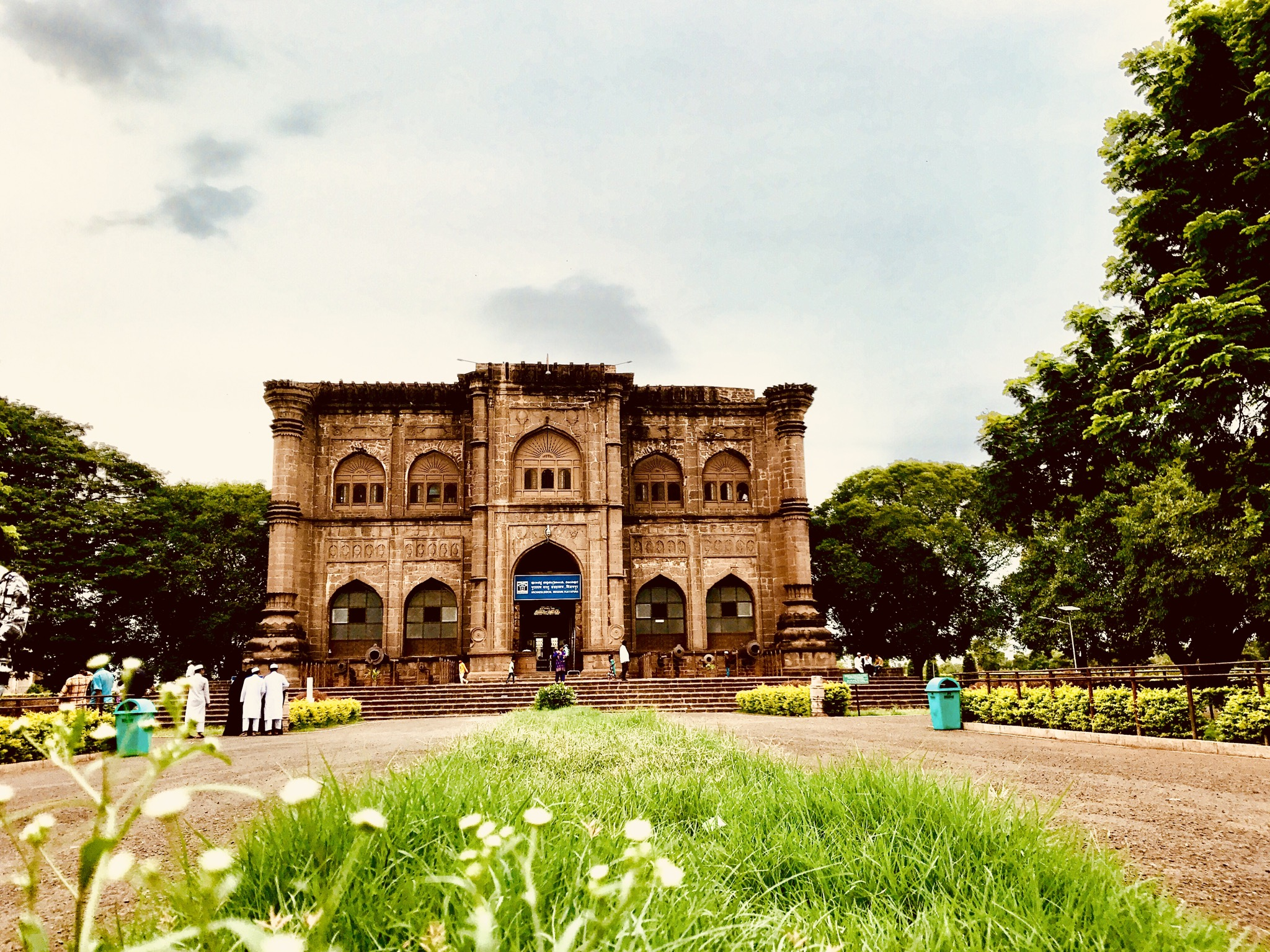
- Established: 1892
- Coordinates: 16.8288232°N 75.7333091°E

Archaeological Museum, Vijayapura, also known as the Gol Gumbaz Archaeological Museum, is a museum located in Vijayapura, in the Indian state of Karnataka. It is located in the Naqqar Khana, which stands opposite the Gol Gumbaz. It falls under the purview of the Archaeological Survey of India.

== History ==
The museum was established in 1892 by the British. In 1912, the management of the museum was entrusted to the district collector. It was known as the Bijapur Museum. In 1962, it was taken over by the Archaeological Survey of India.

== Building ==
The Naqqar Khana was a part of the Gol Gumbaz complex. It is a double-storied rectangular building, built in 1631 CE, during the reign of Mohammed Adil Shah.

== Collection ==
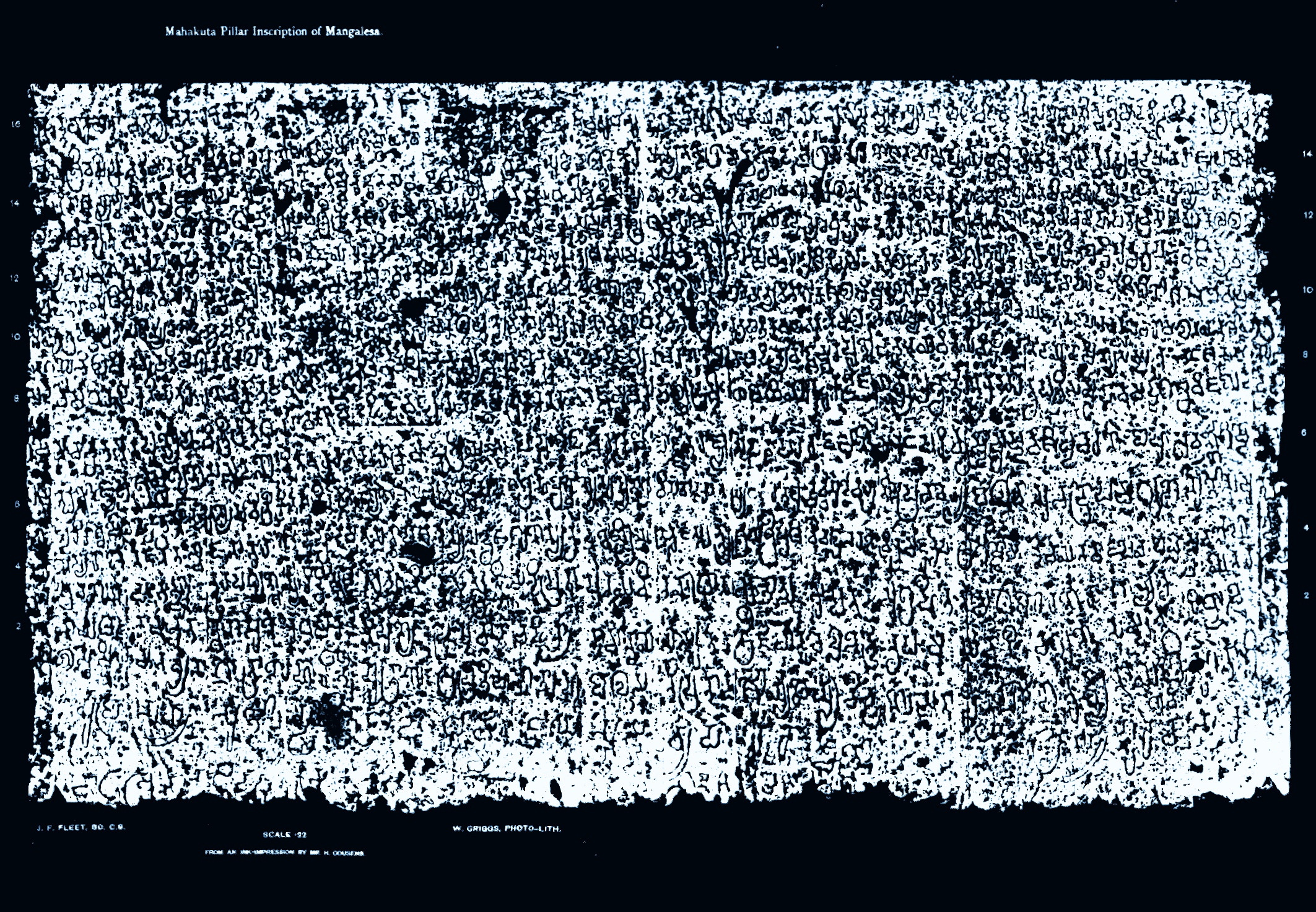
The Mahakuta Pillar inscription

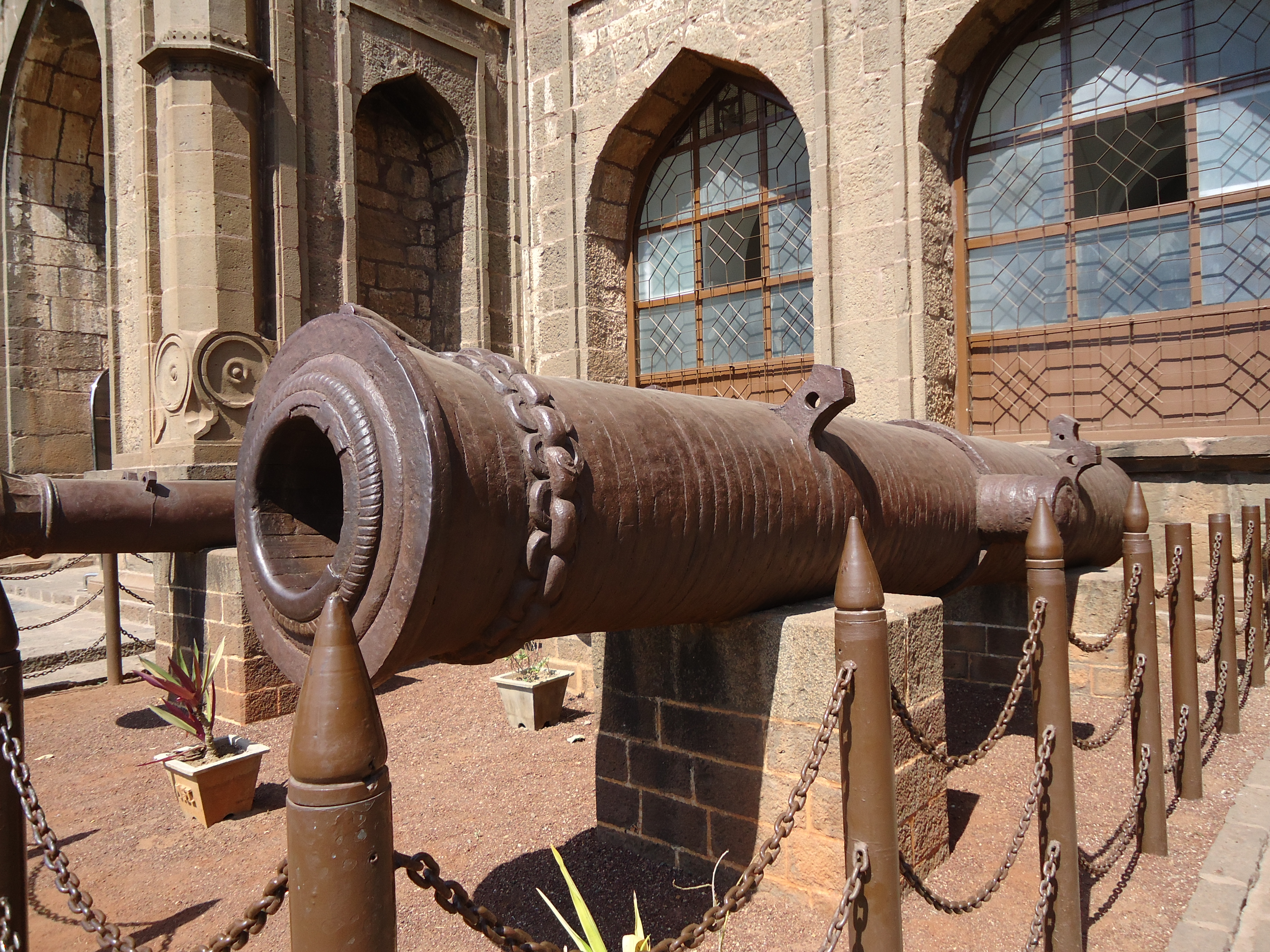
One of the cannons displayed near the entrance

More than 1600 artefacts are housed in eight galleries. The collection comprises mostly objects found in Vijayapura and its environs. At the entrance of the museum, six cannons of varying sizes are displayed. Miniature paintings in the Mughal and Rajput styles, Indian sculpture, weaponry, coins, earthenware, Bidriware, Chinaware, and textiles are among the exhibits.

The Mahakuta Pillar inscription is also among the collection. Among Indian sculpture, hero stones from the 7th and 8th centuries, an 8th-century stone Ganesha found in Aihole, an 11th-century Nataraja with eight arms, and a 14th-century Parswanatha are some of the notable exhibits. A stone representation of Rama Raya's head is also among the objects of note.

== Gallery ==
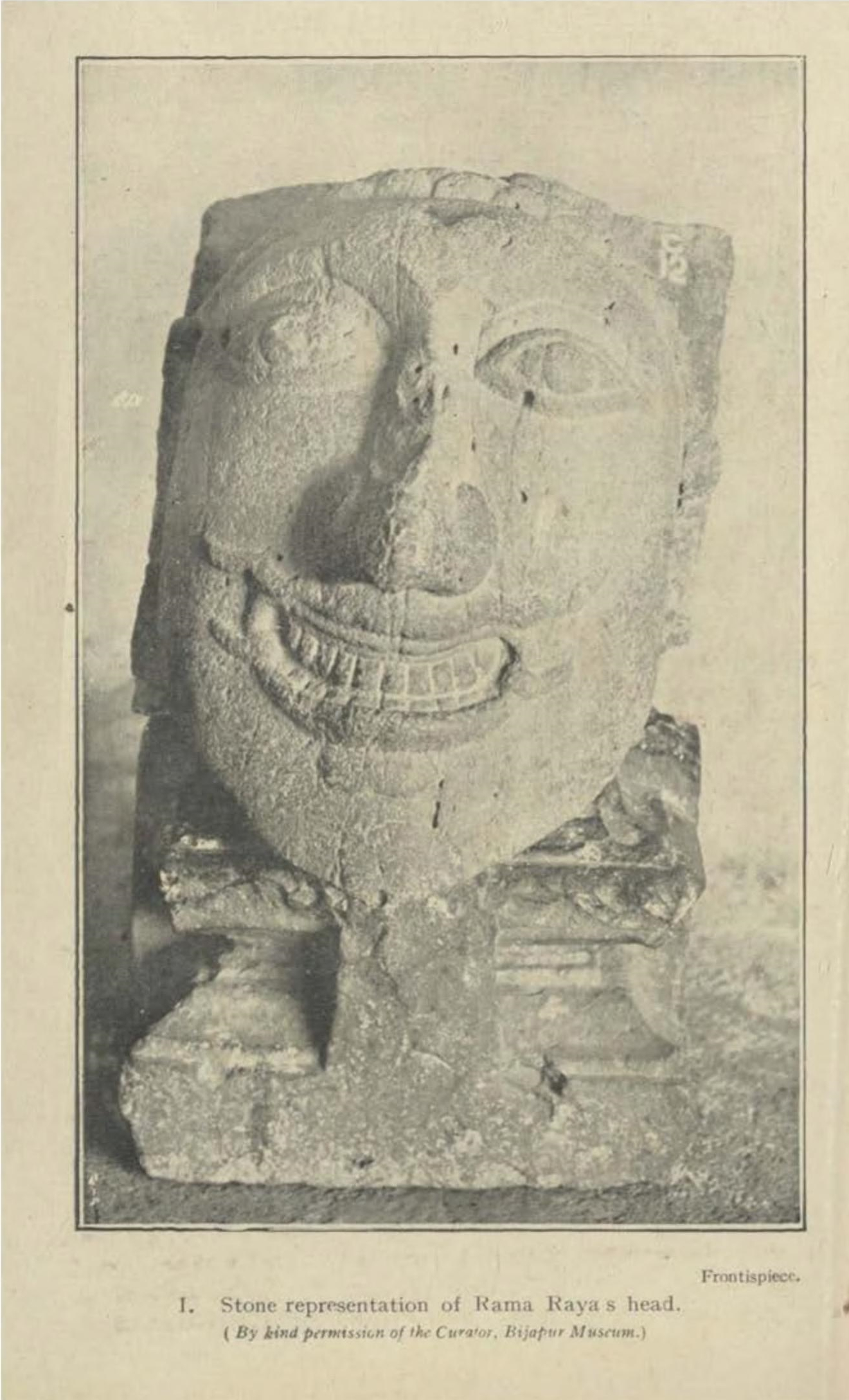
Stone representation of Rama Raya's head

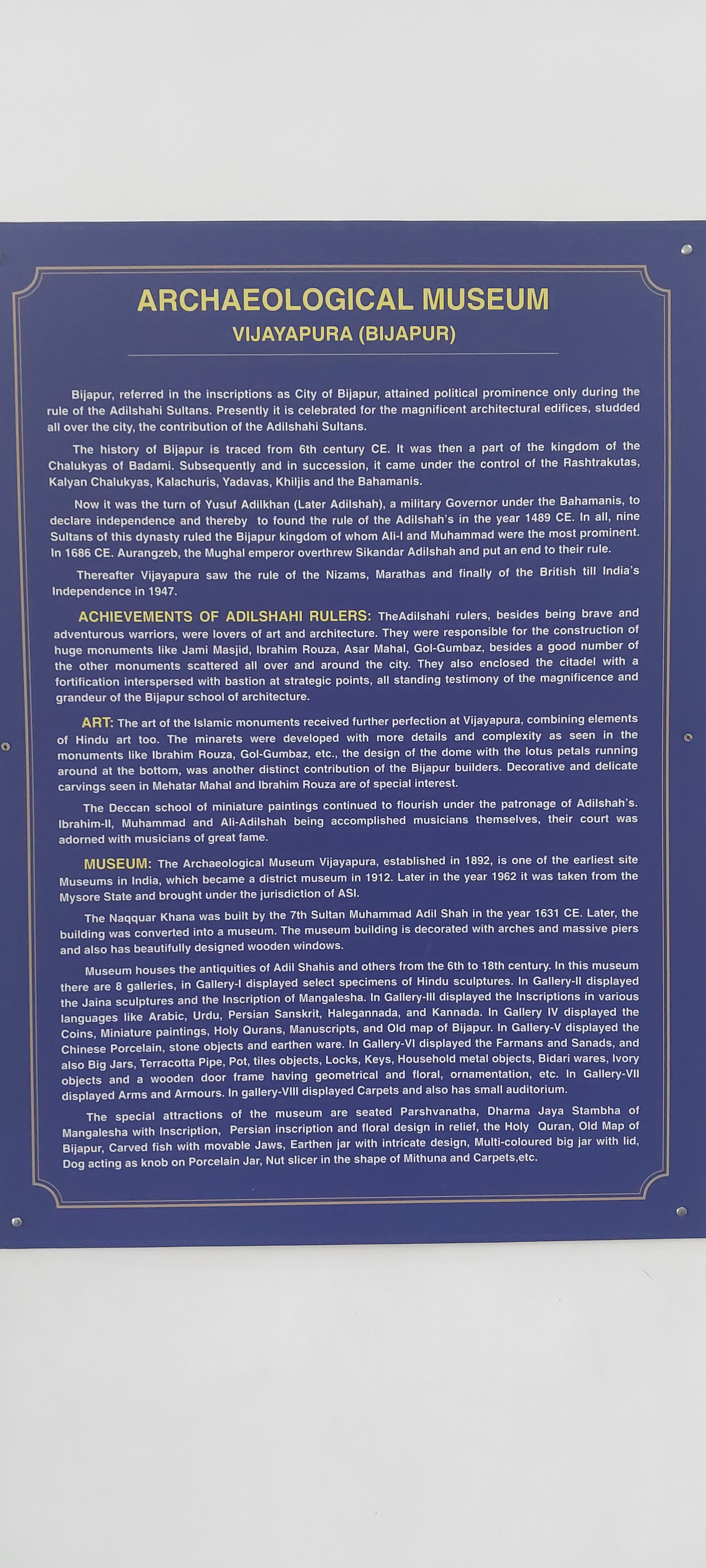
Archaeological Museum board, inside the Gol Gumbaz
