= Khazan system =

Traditional farming system in India

The Khazan is a traditional farming system of Goa, India. It comprises mainly rice-fish fields established on reclaimed coastal wetlands, salt marshes and mangrove forests. It involves construction of levees and sluice gates to prevent sea water from entering the fields.

The Bandora (Bandiwade) copper-plate inscription of Anirjita-varman (likely a Konkan Maurya king), dated to 5th-6th century on palaeographical grounds, refers to the khazan system as khajjana. It records the grant of tax-exempt land in Dwadasa-desha (modern Bardez), including one hala (a unit) of khajjana land. The recipient of the grant was expected to convert this wetland into a cultivated field by constructing a bund to prevent the salty sea water from entering the land.

Historically, an association of villagers (gaunkaris) maintained the local khazan fields and its associated levees. This system continued under the Portuguese rule, with communidades maintaining the khazan system through an association of farmers (bhous or bhaus).

== Cultural Significance of Khazans ==
Khazans are intertwined with the religious and cultural aspect of Goa. The Konsachem Fest (harvest festival) is first celebrated at Our Lady of Snows Church in Raia.
