= Mahakuta group of temples =

Mahakuta Mahakoota
- village
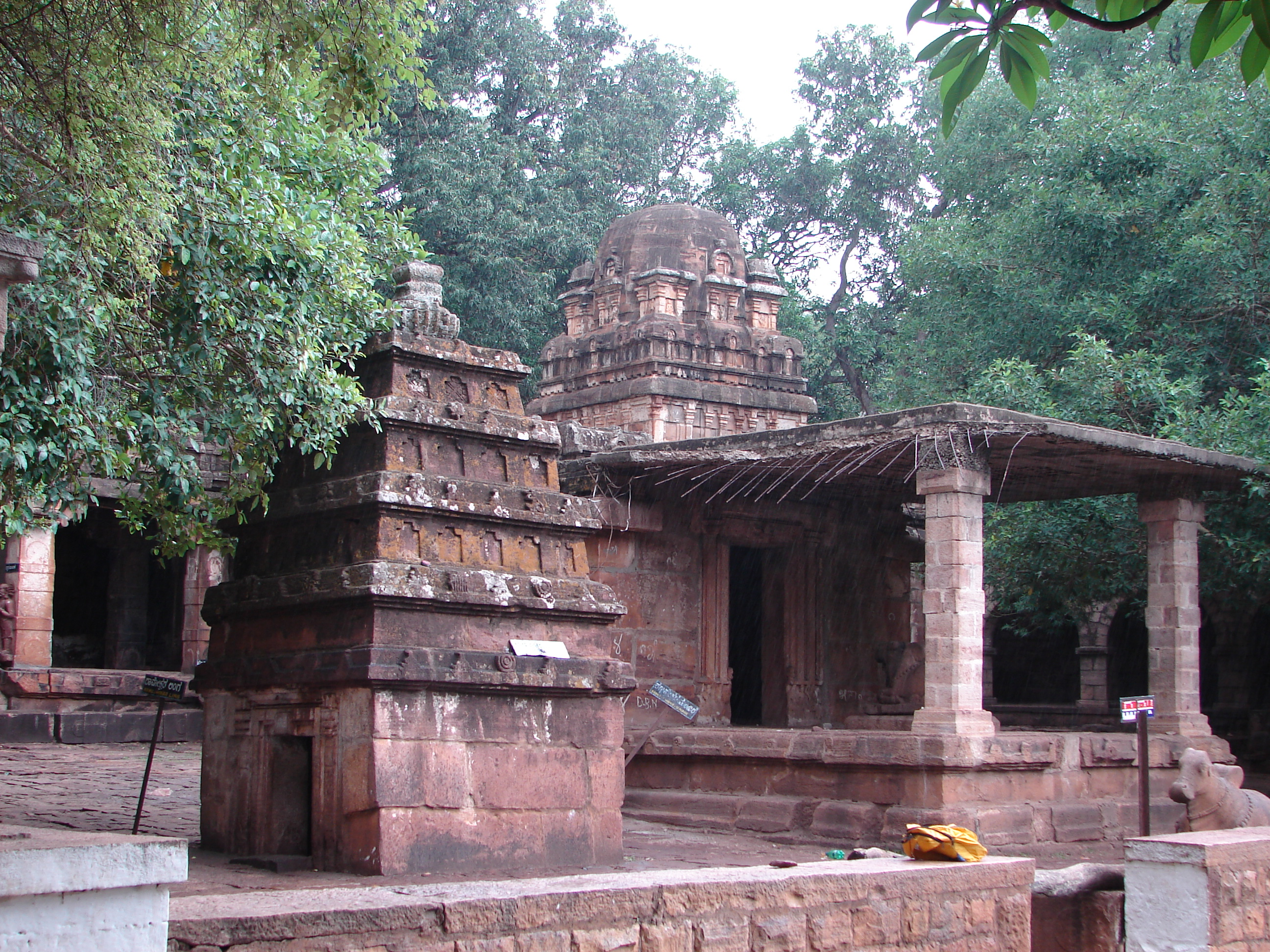
- Mallikarjuna temple (at rear), a dravida style temple at Mahakuta

- Location within Karnataka
- Coordinates: 15°55′58″N 75°43′18″E
- Country: India
- State: Karnataka
- District: Bagalkot

Languages
  - Official: Kannada
- Time zone: UTC+5:30 (IST)
- Postal code: 587201
- Nearest city: Badami

The Mahakuta group of temples is located in Mahakuta, a village in the Bagalkot district of Karnataka state, India. It is an important place of worship for Hindus and the location of a well-known Shaiva monastery. The temples are dated to the 6th or 7th century CE and were constructed by the early kings of the Chalukya dynasty of Badami. The dating of the temples is based on the style of architecture which is similar to that of the temples in nearby Aihole and the information in two notable inscriptions in the complex: the Mahakuta Pillar inscription dated between 595–602 CE (written in the Sanskrit language and Kannada script); and an inscription of Vinapoti, a concubine of king Vijayaditya, dated between 696–733 CE and written in the Kannada language and script.

== Basic plan ==
The Karnataka artisans of the 7th century achieved a certain eclectism in their architecture by building south Indian dravida style temples adjacent to north Indian nagara style temples. Further, their dravida and nagara styles were local, indigenous variants and unrelated to the architectural styles that prevailed in modern Tamil Nadu to the south, and Central India ("Madhyadesha") to the north. They achieved this by combining the basic plan of one style with characteristics of the other. The dravida style temples here have a tiered tower over the shrine which is capped with a dome like structure. The nagara style temples use a curvilinear tower over a shrine which has a square plan, and is capped by a ribbed stone. The development of this hybrid style, achieved by combining the typological features of the two basic architectural styles, is considered a peculiarity of the Karnataka region and defines the beginnings of the Vesara style of architecture.

A natural mountain spring flows within the temple complex and feeds fresh water into a large tank called the Vishnu Pushkarni ("Lotus pool of god Vishnu") and an ablution tank called Papavinasha Tirtha ("Tank of Ablution"). Among the several shrines in the complex, the Mahakuteshvara temple, built in the dravida style, and the Mallikarjuna temple are the largest. There is a small shrine in the centre of the Vishnu Pushkarni tank and in it is a Shiva linga (universal symbol of god Shiva) called Panchamukha linga ("five faced linga"), one face for each direction and one on top.

== Inscriptions ==
The Mahakuta complex has provided historians two important 7th century inscriptions. The Mahakuta Pillar inscription, dated variously between 595–602 CE records a grant made by Durlabhadevi, a queen of Pulakeshin I (the father of king Mangalesha). The queen supplemented an earlier grant with an endowment of ten villages, including Pattadakal and Aihole to god Mahkuteshvara Natha. In addition, the inscription provides important information about the Chalukyan lineage, their military expeditions, their conquests and early monuments. The pillar goes by the name Dharma-jayastambha ("Pillar of victory of religion") and is on exhibition at a Bijapur archaeological museum. The other inscription, ascribed to Vinapoti, king Vijayaditya's concubine, is inscribed in the porch of the Mahakuteshvara temple. It describes a grant of rubies and a silver umbrella to the deity Mahakuteshvara in addition to a piece of land.

== Gallery ==
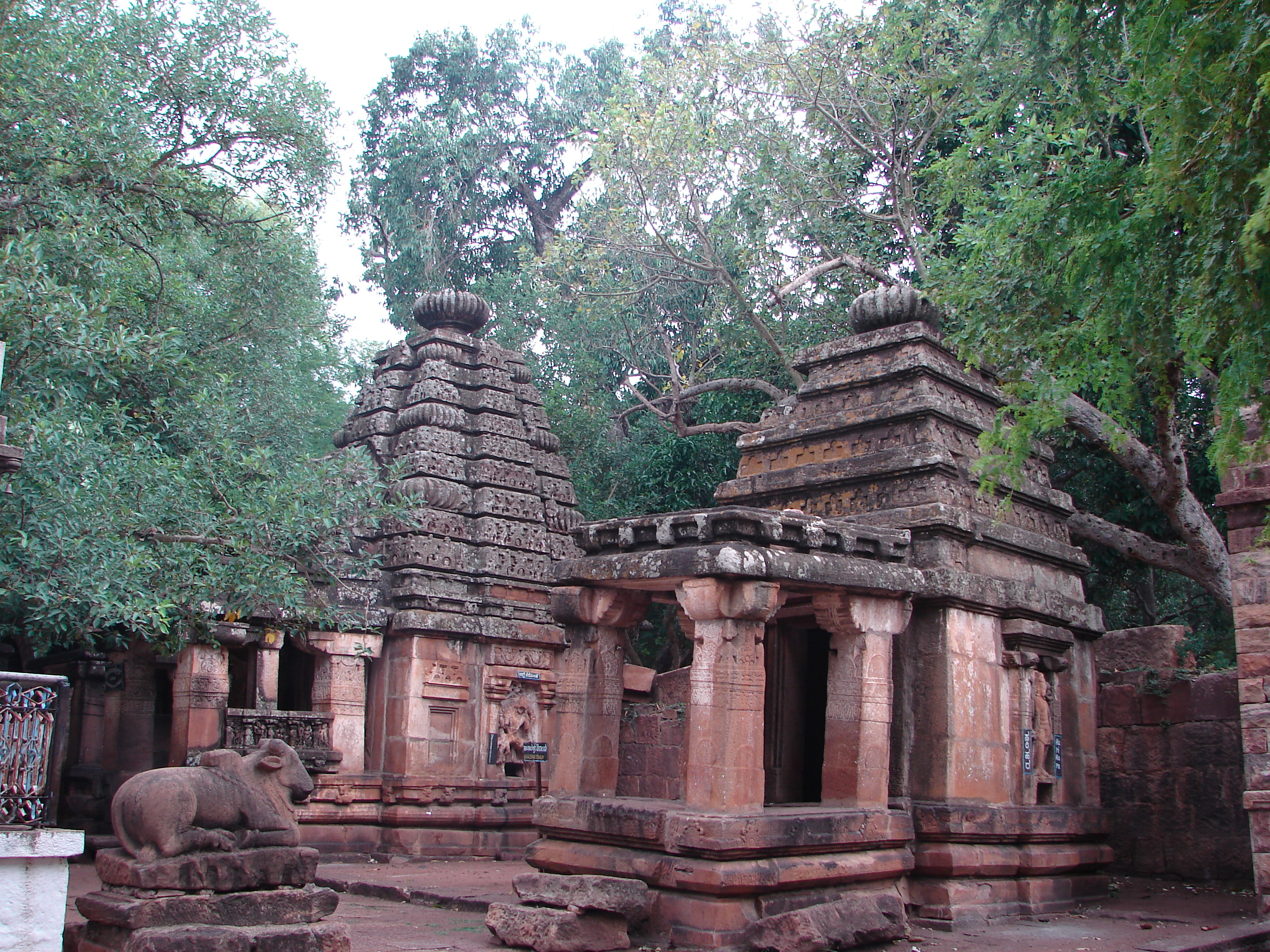
Vishnu temple with nagara superstructure (left) and a shrine with Kadamba superstructure (right) at Mahakuta

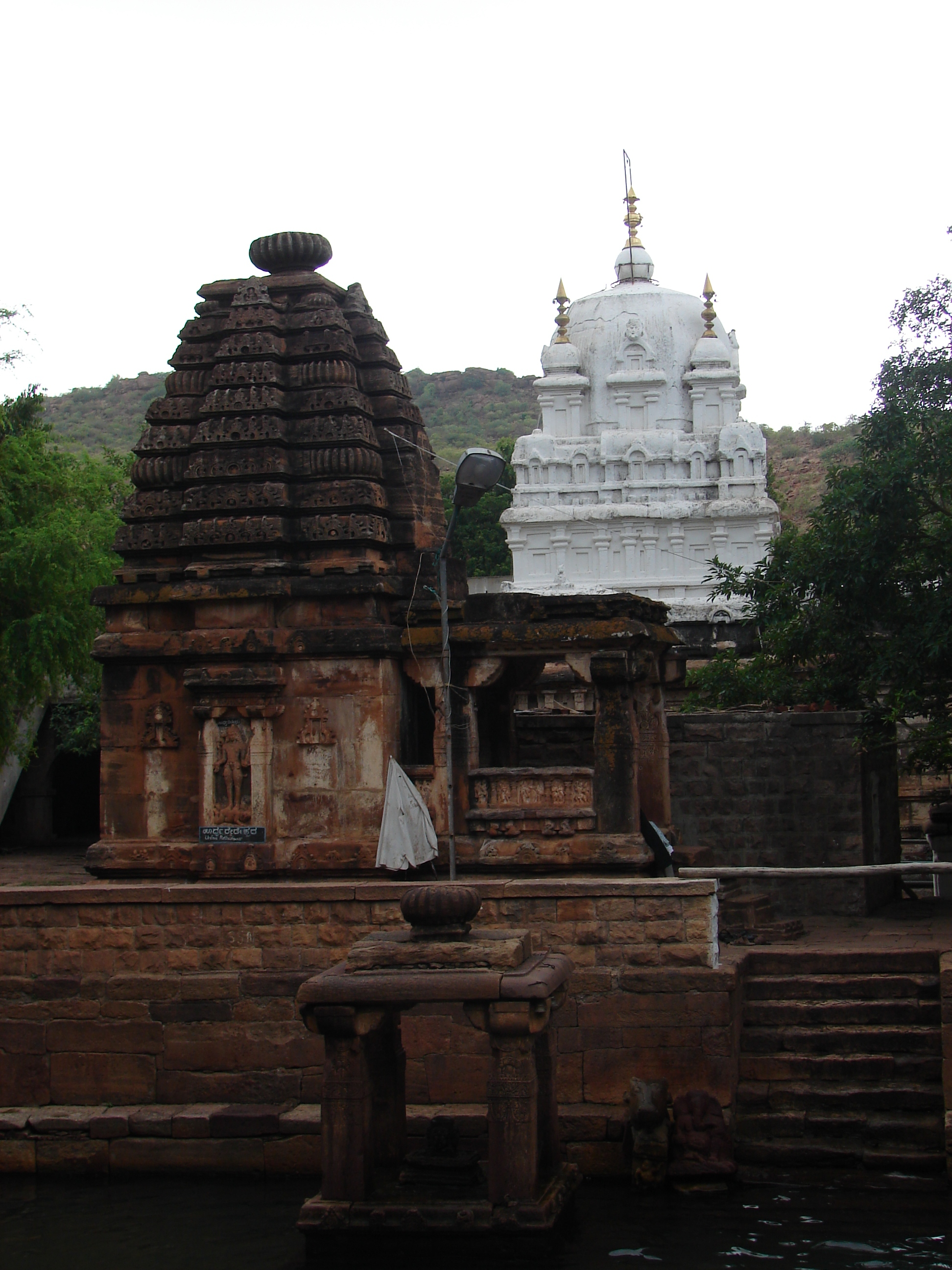
Mahakuteshvara temple (painted white) in the dravida style (rear) and Sangameshvara temple in nagara style (front)

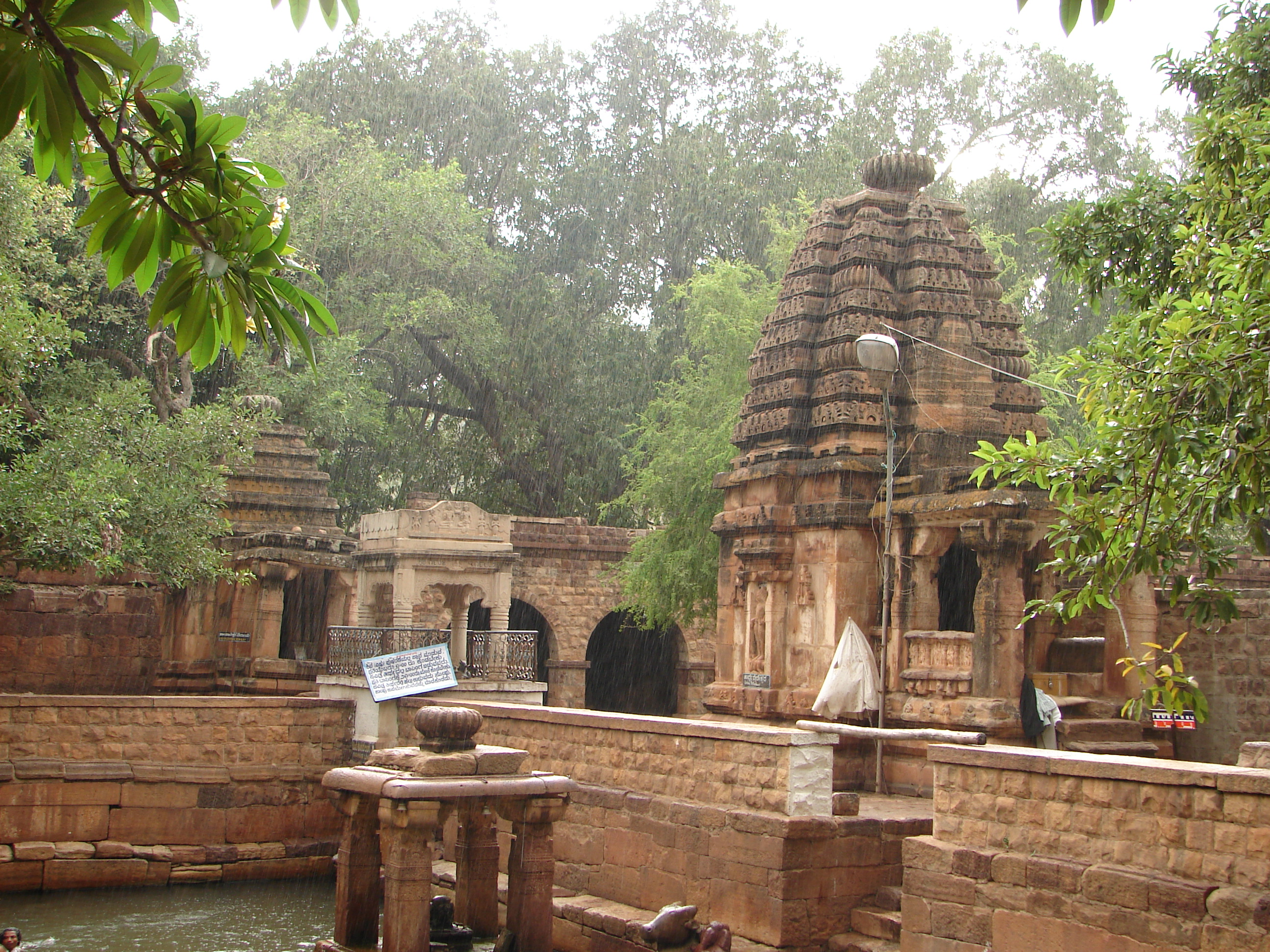
Sangameshvara temple with nagara superstructure at Mahakuta

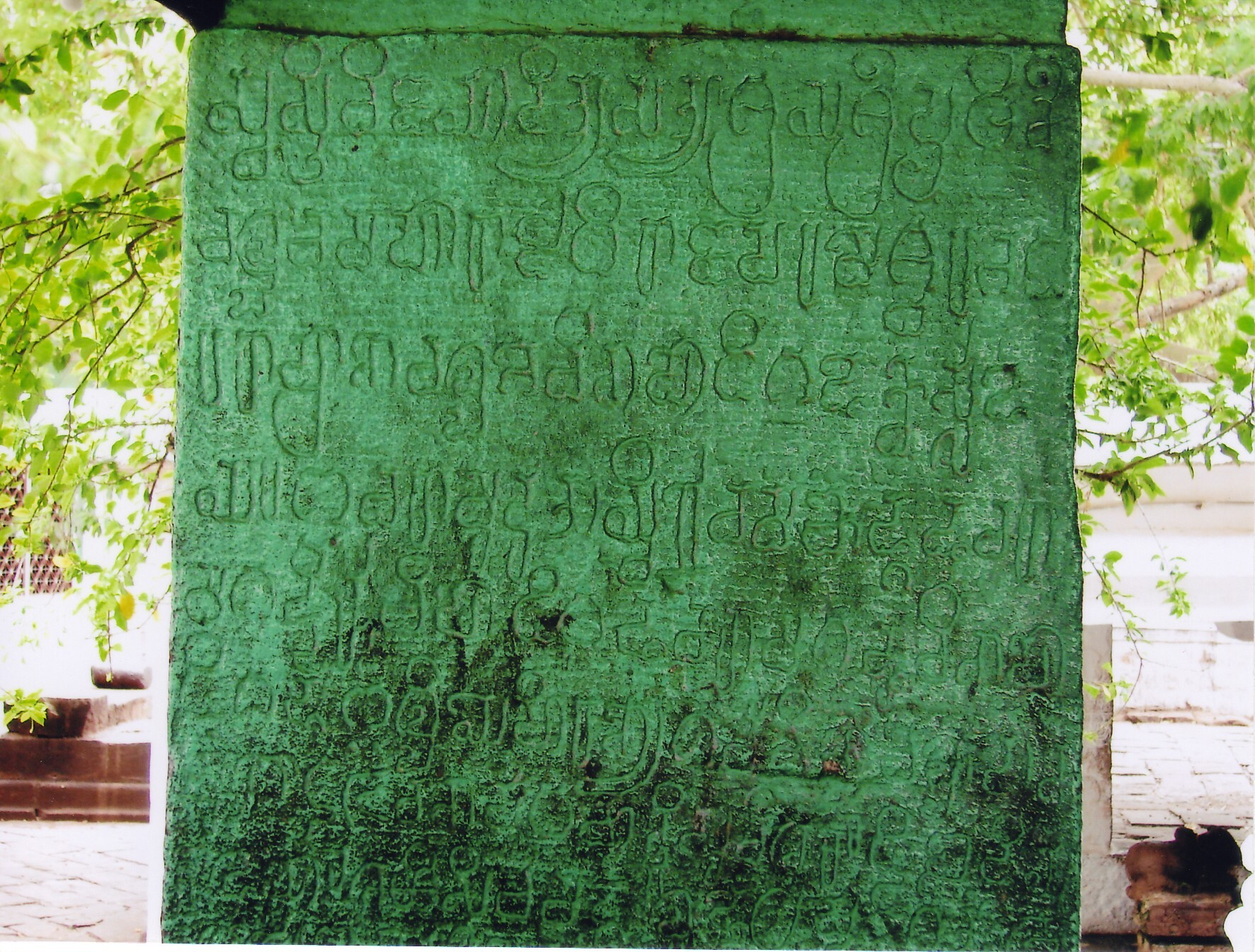
7th century Kannada inscription of Vinapoti, concubine of Badami Chalukya King Vijayaditya

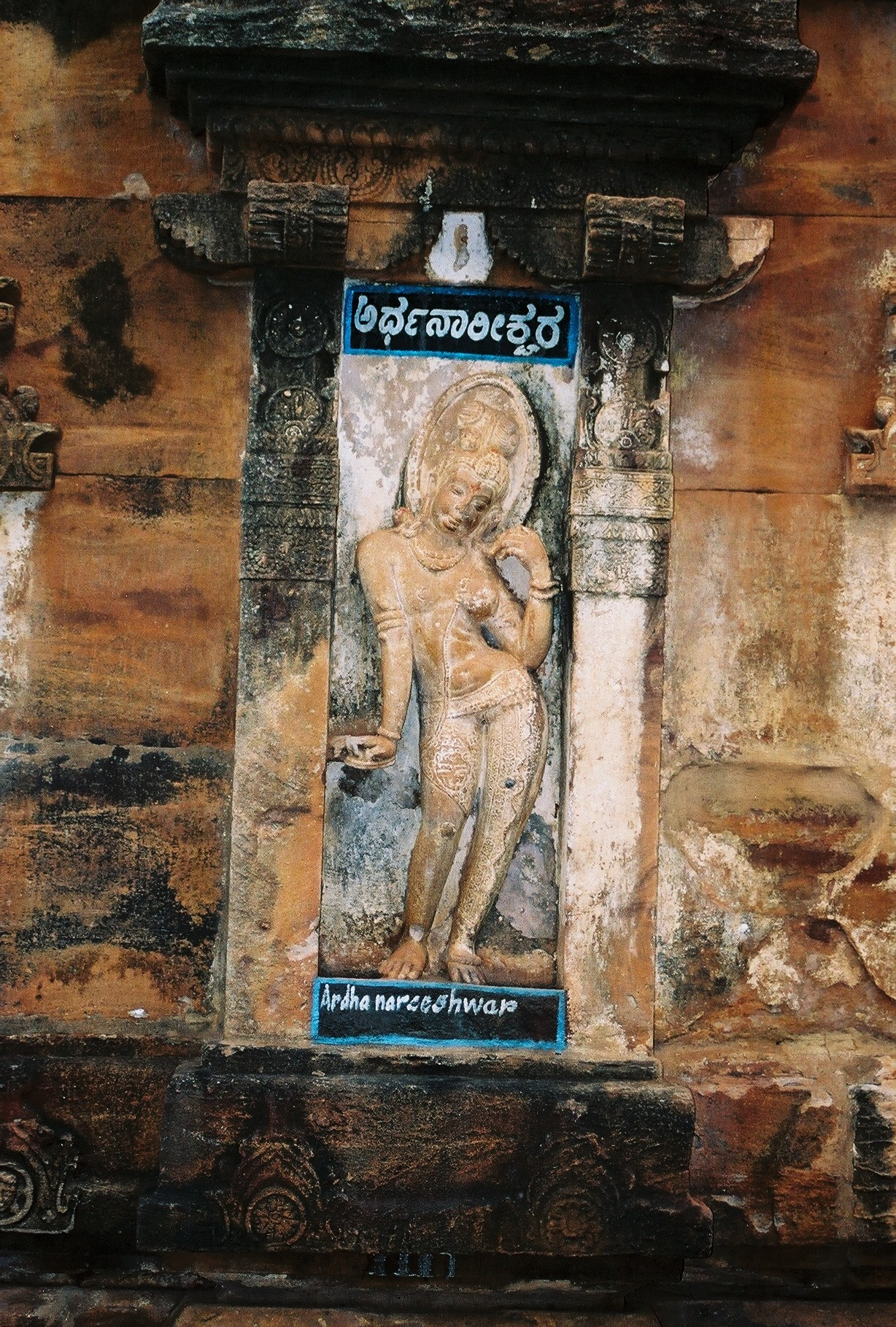
Sculpture of Ardhanareeshvara (form of the Hindu god Shiva) at the Mahakuta temples

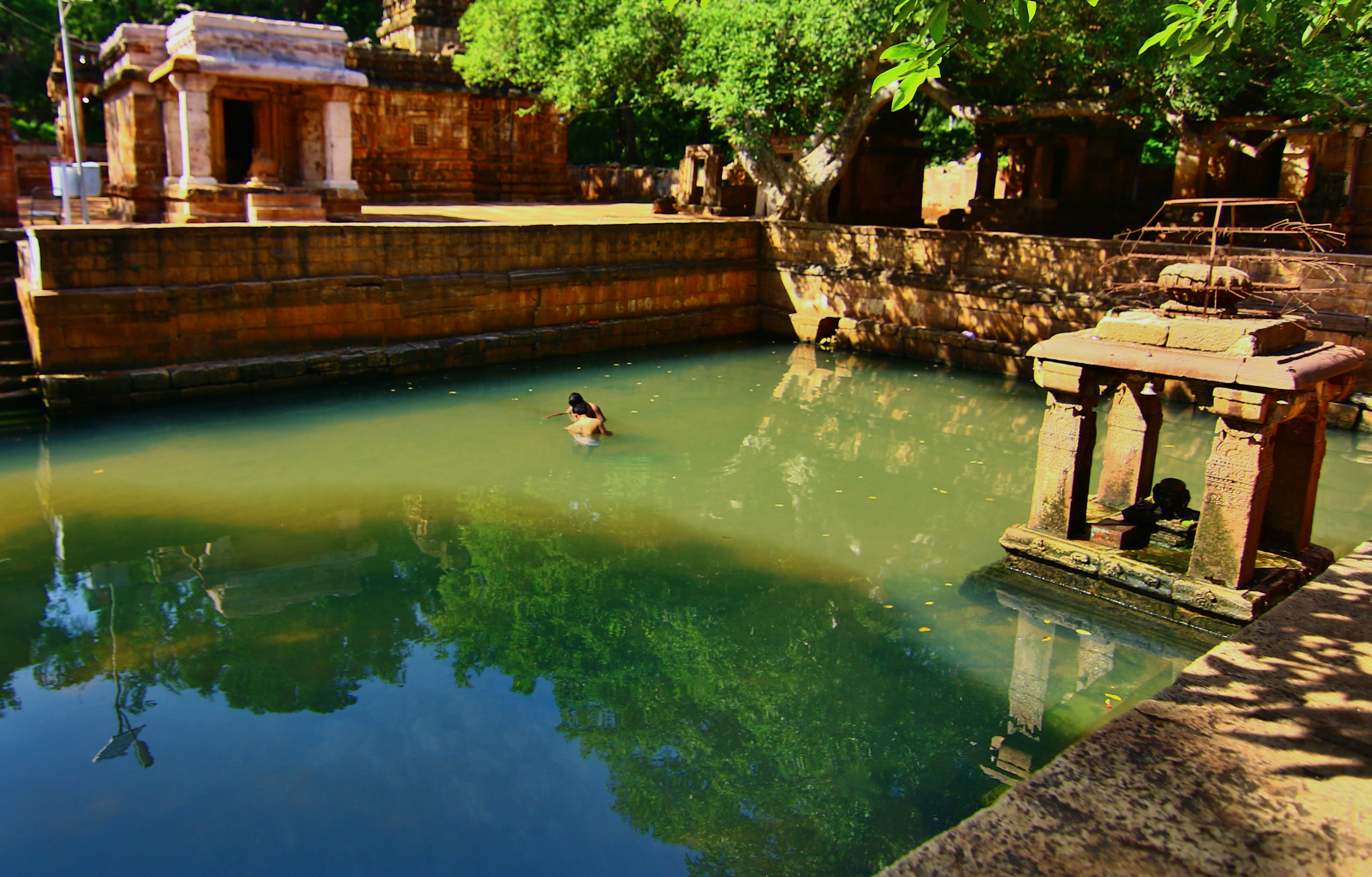
Mahakuta temple tank
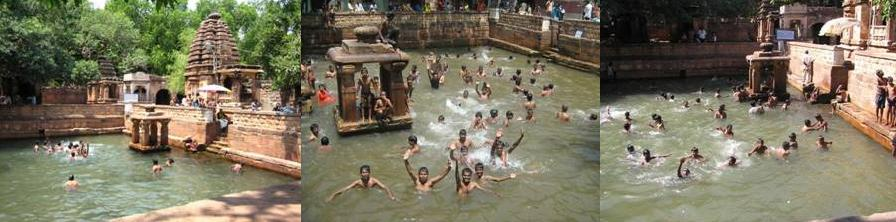
Temple tank in Mahakoota

== See also ==
- Aihole
- Badami Cave Temples
- Badami Chalukya Architecture
- Banashankari Amma Temple at Cholachagudd
- Pattadakal
