= Mauryas of Puri =

Indian dynasty

Find spots of the inscriptions attributed to Maurya kings or their feudatories

The Maurya dynasty ruled the coastal Konkan region in present-day Goa and Maharashtra states of India, between the 4th and the 7th centuries. Their capital was Puri, which is variously identified as Gharapuri (Elephanta), Salsette, or Rajapuri. The dynasty is known only from a few records, and there is very little clarity on its genealogy, chronology, territory, administration and political status.

== Origin and chronology ==
Historian D.C. Sircar (1942) theorized that the Mauryas of Konkana and the Mauryas of Rajasthan "apparently" claimed descent from the imperial Maurya prince-viceroys of Ujjayini and Suvarnagiri. Later writers have repeated this theory, although no concrete evidence of imperial Maurya rule has been discovered in the Goa region.

=== Northern Konkan ===
The 400 CE Vada inscription from the reign of the Maurya king Suketu-varman, dated to the Shaka year 322, suggests that the Mauryas ruled the northern Konkan region in present-day Maharashtra at the end of the 4th century. Historian Ajay Mitra Shastri theorizes that Suketavarman was probably a Traikutaka vassal, while historian V.T. Gune theorizes that the Mauryas were probably Kalachuri vassals. Numismatist E.J. Rapson theorized that the Mauryas of Konkana were a branch of the Traikutaka family.

According to one theory, the Maurya capital Puri was located on the Elephanta Island. As early as 1322 CE, European visitors mention the name Porus or Pori, referring to a king or a city, and identifying it with the Elephanta Island or the nearby Thane. Gharapuri, another name for the island, is attested in a book by Edward Moor (1810). The names of Morbandar or Moreh-bandar ("Mor or Maurya port") and Raj-bandar ("royal port"), two small villages on the Island, may be relics of the Maurya rule on the island. Historian S.J. Mangalam has attributed some lead coins discovered on the Elephanta Island to the Mauryas, although numismatist P. L. Gupta has disputed this. Some scholars dispute the identification of Puri with Elephanta, arguing that the island is too small and of uneven terrain to support a capital city, and that the archaeological remains found there are mainly religious in nature.

=== Southern Konkan ===
During 6th-7th century, the Mauryas seem to have extended their rule to southern Konkan (the present-day northern Goa), where the Bhojas may have been their feudatories. Inscriptions of kings Anirjita-varman and Chandra-varman, who ruled from the Kumara-dwipa island (modern Cumbarjua), have been discovered in this area. Historians have dated these inscriptions to 5th-6th century on palaeographical grounds. The dynasty of these kings is not certain, with some historians identifying them as Mauryas, while others identifying them as Bhojas. For example, Chandravarman's inscription is fragmentary and only few letters are visible in the first line. D.C. Sircar, who read these letters as "māryya", comments that they could have formed another word or a part of another word, including "...m āryya", "mauryya", or "praṇayinā".

== Inscriptions ==
The Vada stone inscription, issued during the reign of Suketu-varman, refers to the construction of Hindu temples such as Koteshvara (or Kotishvara), Vasishtheshvara, and Siddheshvara at Vataka (modern Vada). For example, it states that Simha-datta, the son of Kumara-datta, installed an image of the god Kotishvara. No remains of these temples exist now, although the Gazetteer of the Bombay Presidency records the existence of an old temple at Vada in the 19th century.

The Bandora (Bandiwade) copper-plate inscription of Anirjita-varman records the grant of tax-exempt land in Dvadasa-desha (modern Bardez) to Hastyarya, a learned Samavedi Brahmin of Hariti gotra.

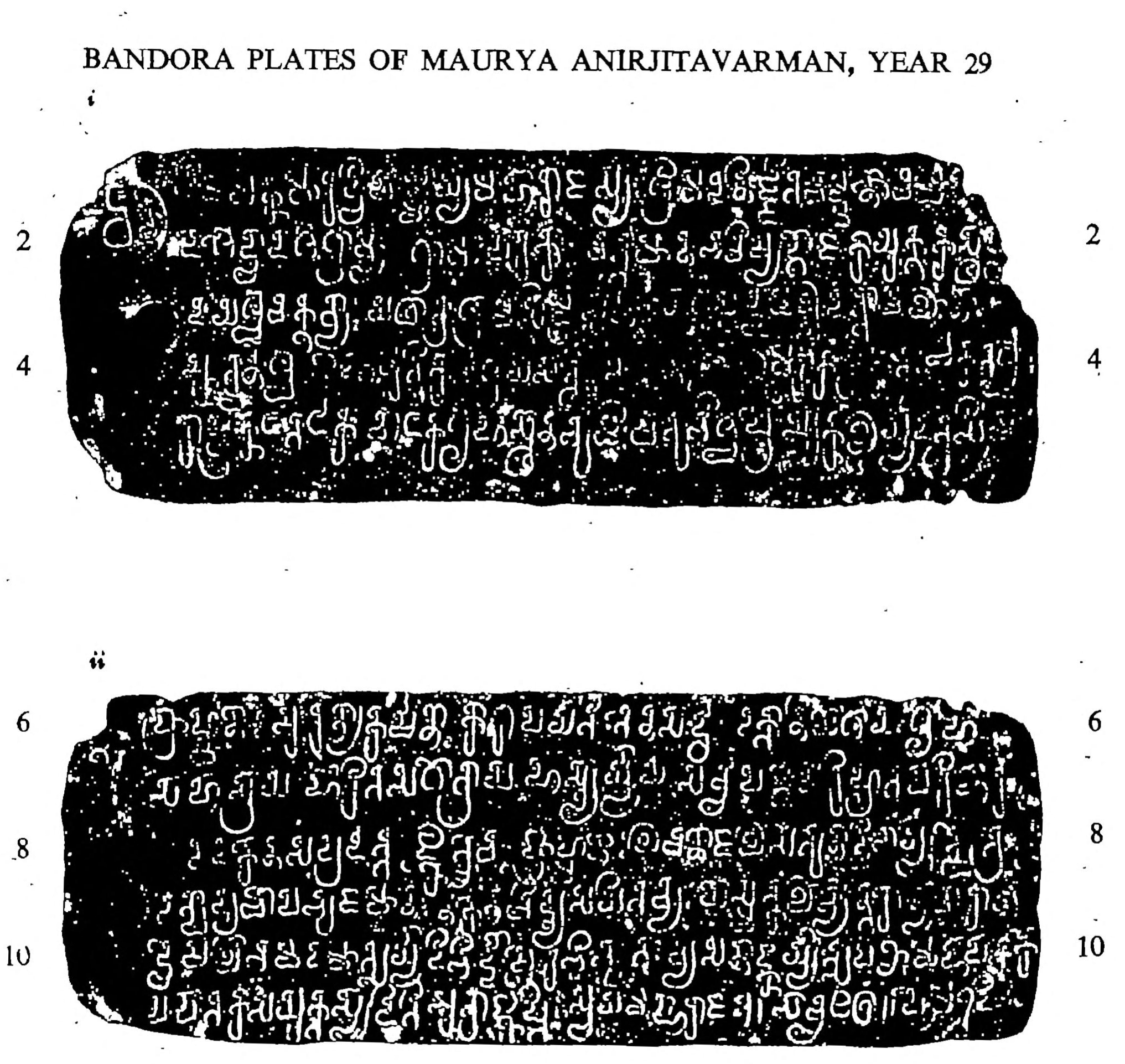
Copper plate inscription of Anirjitavarman Maurya, Bandora, Goa

The grant included one hala (a unit) of khajjana coastal wetland. The donee was expected to convert this wetland into a cultivated field by constructing a bund to prevent the salty sea water from entering the land. In addition, the grant included some forest land, which the donee was expected to convert into a field by employing four batches of workers to clear the forest. The king also granted the donee some land previously belonging to an unnamed Rashtrakuta, with a garden, an irrigation tank, and a site for building a house. The grant addresses the residents of a desh (an administrative unit comprising 12 villages) and officials of the present and the future. This suggests that the donee held considerable power in the village administration.

The Shiroda copper-plate inscription of Chandra-varman records the grant of a land to a Buddhist maha-vihara at Shivapura (modern Shiroda).

== Economy ==
Chalukya records describe the Maurya capital Puri as the "Goddess of the fortune of western ocean", suggesting that they were a local maritime power. The Maurya economy apparently featured both sea trade and inalnd trade. There is some evidence of customs posts set up at Tana (near Ponda), Curdi, and Cortalim. However, there is not enough historical data to quantify or analyze such trade in detail.

Agriculture was likely an important revenue base for the state, as the contemporary inscriptions refer to reclamation of coastal wetlands and forests for agriculture. The inscriptions attest to the existence of the khajjana system (later known as khazan), which involved construction of embankments to prevent the sea water from entering the coastal paddy fields. The kings made land grants to the Brahmins, who legitimized their royal status in return.

== Decline ==
The Maurya rule likely ended as a result of Chalukya invasions from the south. The Aihole inscription of the Chalukya king Pulakeshin II describes his father Kirttivarman I (r. c. 566–592) as "the night of doom" for the Mauryas and other dynasties. The Chalukya records suggest that Kirttivarman defeated the Mauryas and appointed a new governor for the former Maurya territory. Bhojas, the former vassals of the Mauryas, may have accepted the Chalukya suzerainty.

The Mauryas probably continued to hold power as Chalukya vassals during the reign of Kirttivarman's brother and successor Mangalesha, but declared independence during the Chalukya war of succession between Mangalesha and Pulakeshin II. After consolidating his power in southern Deccan, Pulakeshin II successfully besieged the Mauryan capital Puri, ending their rule. His Aihole inscription states:

In the Konkanas by the impetuous waves of the forces directed by him the rising wavelets of pools in the form of the Mauryas were violently swept away. When, radiant like the destroyer of cities he was subduing Puri, the glory of the western sea, with hundreds of ships in appearance like an array of rutting elephants, the sky, dark-blue like a new lotus and overspread with an army of thick clouds, resembled the sea, and the sea was like the sky.

The fact that the Mauryas survived Kirttivarman's invasion and Pulakeshin II required a large force to subdue Puri suggests that the Mauryas were a formidable power before the Chalukya conquest. The 710 CE inscription of the Chalukya vassal Bhogashakti attests to his family's rule over the "Puri-Konkana" country comprising 14,000 villages.
