= Kirttivarman I =

Chalukya Emperor from 566 to 592

Kirttivarma I
- Maharaja; Shri-prithvi-vallabha; Satyashraya

Chalukya king
- Reign: c. 566 – c. 592
- Predecessor: Pulakeshin I
- Successor: Mangalesha
- Issue: Pulakeshin II, Vishnuvardhana, Buddha-varasa
- Dynasty: Chalukyas of Vatapi
- Father: Pulakeshin I

Kirttivarman I (IAST: Kīrtti-varman; died 592) was the emperor of the Chalukya dynasty from 566 until his death in 592. He ruled parts of present-day Karnataka, Goa, Maharashtra and Andhra Pradesh.

Kirttivarman was the son of his predecessor Pulakeshin I, the first sovereign ruler of the dynasty. He expanded the Chalukya kingdom by defeating the Nalas, the Mauryas of Konkana, the Kadambas, the Alupas, and the Gangas of Talakad.

== Names and titles ==
Some of the dynasty's inscriptions call him Kirtti-raja. The Godachi inscription calls him Katti-arasa, which is probably a Kannada language variant of his name.

Besides the regal title Maharaja, the dynasty's inscriptions accord him the Chalukya family epithets Shri-prithvi-vallabha, Vallabha, and Satyashraya. The Mahakuta pillar inscription of his brother Mangalesha compares him to the legendary king Puru, calling him Puru-rana-parakrama ("valourous in war like Puru").

== Early life ==
Kirttivarman I was a son of Pulakeshin I, the first sovereign ruler of the Chalukya dynasty. The Amminabhavi inscription, which is the last extant record from Pulakeshin's reign, is dated to the 566-567 CE (Shaka year 488). The 578 CE Badami inscription, which was issued during the 12th regnal year of Kirttivarman, is dated to the 31 October 578 CE (the Karttika Paurnamasi of Shaka year 500). Thus, Kirttivarman must have ascended the throne in 566-567 CE.

== Military conquests ==
The 578 CE Badami inscription and the Godachi inscription issued during Kirttivarman's reign do not provide any information about the political events of his reign. The Aihole inscription of Pulakeshin II states that Kirttivarman was "the night of doom" for the Nalas, the Mauryas, and the Kadambas. The Mahakuta Pillar inscription of Kirttivarman's brother and successor Mangalesha credits him with victories over rulers of several other kingdoms, but this is an obvious exaggeration.

=== Kadambas ===
Apart from the Aihole inscription, several other Chalukya records credit Kirttivarman with victory over the Kadambas, whose capital was located at Vaijayanti (modern Banavasi), and whose various branches ruled in the adjacent areas. The Mahakuta Pillar inscription states that the ruler of Vaijayanti was one of the kings vanquished by Kirttivarman. The inscriptions of the later Kalyani Chalukyas, who claimed descent from the Vatapi Chalukyas, poetically describe Kirttivarman "as an axe that cut at the very roots of the Kadambas" (kadamba is also the name of a tree).

Kirttivarman's father Pulakeshin I appears to have achieved some military successes against the Kadambas. Kirttivarman adopted a more aggressive policy against them, and annexed their capital to the Chalukya kingdom. The Chalukya inscriptions do not mention the contemporary Kadamba king, but he was most probably Ajavarman, the son of Krishnavarman II.

The Chalukya inscriptions issued during and after the regency of Vijaya (r. c. 650 – c. 655) state that Kirttivarman obtained "pure fame" by defeating the rulers of Banavasi and other mandalas (provinces), which suggests that he defeated the Kadambas of Banavasi, but also the rulers of other Kadamba branches. The Aihole inscription states that he broke up a confederacy of the Kadambas: this confederacy may have included the Gangas and the Sendrakas, who were allowed to rule as Chalukya vassals after Kirttivarman's victory.

=== Nalas ===
The Nala dynasty ruled in and around present-day Chhattisgarh during the 6th century. Besides the Aihole inscription, Kirttivarman's victory over the Nalas is also mentioned in the later Chalukya records which state that he destroyed the habitations (nilaya) of the Nalas.

During the time of Kirttivarman's grandson Vikramaditya I and his successors, the Chalukya empire had a vishaya (province) named Nalavadi, whose name may have derived from its former rulers, the Nalas.

=== Mauryas of Konkana ===
The Mauryas of Konkana (modern Konkan) ruled the coastal region of present-day Maharashtra, from their capital at Puri, which is generally identified with Gharapuri on the Elephanta Island. After defeating the Mauryas, Kirttivarman appears to have appointed a new governor for the former Maurya territory.

According to one theory, this governor was Satyashraya Dhruva-raja Indra-varman, who is variously identified as Kirttivarman's maternal relative or a member of his family. The Nerur inscription from the reign of Kirttivarman's successor Mangalesha records the donation of the Kundivataka village in Konkana vishaya (province) by this governor. According to another theory, the governor appointed by Kirttivarman was Svamiraja, a Chalukya chief, who according to the Nerur inscription, was defeated and killed by Mangalesha.

=== Alupas ===
According to the Mahakuta Pillar inscription, Kirttivarman subjugated the Alupas (also called Alukas or Aluvas), who subsequently became Chalukya feudatories. The find spots of the Alupa inscriptions suggest that they ruled in the Dakshina Kannada region.

=== Gangas ===
The Mahakuta Pillar inscription also mentions Kirttivarman's victory over the Gangas, who like the Alupas, ended up as Chalukya feudatories. These Gangas were most probably the Gangas of Talakad, who had earlier served as Kadamba feudatories. Kirttivarman may have defeated them during his campaign against the Kadambas, and probably reinstated them after they agreed to accept his suzerainty. The Ganga rival of Kirttivarman was most probably Durvinita.

=== Other purported victories ===
The Mahakuta Pillar inscription also claims that Kirttivarman defeated the rulers of Vanga, Anga, Kalinga, Vattura (unidentified), Magadha, Madraka, Kerala (Cheras of western Tamil Nadu and central Kerala), Ganga, Mushaka (northern Kerala), Pandya, Dramila (possibly the Pallava), Choliya, Aluka and Vaijayanti. This is an obvious poetic exaggeration, and these claims do not appear even in the inscriptions of Kirttivarman's own son, Pulakeshin II. Most of these territories were not a part of the Chalukya empire even at its zenith.

== Extent of the kingdom ==
Kirttivarman inherited a small kingdom centered around Vatapi, and expanded it substantially. At its height, his kingdom extended from the Konkan coast of present-day Maharashtra in north to the Shimoga district of Karnataka in the south; and from the Arabian Sea in the west to the Kurnool and Guntur districts (Andhra Pradesh) in the east.

== Administration ==
The Godachi inscription describes Kirttivarman as someone "who felt delighted in fostering justice to his subjects".

His minister Vyaghrasvamin, who held the offices of Rajyasarvasya and Dhurandhara, was a learned man.

The Chiplun inscription of Satyashraya describes Kirttivarman I as "the first maker" of the Vatapa city, although other Chalukya inscriptions credit his father Pulakeshin I with making Vatapi the dynasty's capital and constructing a fort there. This discrepancy can be explained by assuming that the construction of the Vatapi fort was started during Pulakeshin's reign, and was completed during Kirttivarman's reign.

== Religion ==
According to the Mahakuta Pillar inscription, Kirttivarman performed the Agnishtoma and Bahusuvarna ritual sacrifices. The Godachi inscription states that he was well-versed in all the Shastras and Smritis. The Mahakuta Pillar inscription of his brother Mangalesha states that Mangalesha constructed a Vishnu temple on his orders.

== Personal life ==
Kirttivarman married a sister of the Sendraka king Shri-vallabha Senanada, as attested by the Chiplun inscription of Pulakeshin II. The Sendrakas were former Kadamba vassals, who had transferred their allegiance to the Chalukyas after Kirttivarman's conquest of the Kadamba kingdom.

He had at least three sons: Pulakeshin II, Vishnuvardhana, and Buddha-varasa. The Nirpan grant inscription names Dharashraya Jayasimha as a son of Kirttivarman, but according to J. F. Fleet, this inscription is spurious.

== Succession ==
Kirttivarman was succeeded by his brother Mangalesha, who was succeeded by Kirttivarman's son Pulakeshin II. The inscriptions of the Kalyani Chalukyas suggest that Mangalesha assumed the throne because Pulakeshin II was a minor at the time of Kirttivarman's death, and returned the kingdom to Pulakeshin II when the latter became an adult. However, the Aihole prashasti inscription of Pulakeshin II suggests that there was a conflict over the throne, which resulted in the murder of Mangalesha.

The later records of the family largely ignore Mangalesha, and the inscriptions from the reign of Mangalesha are not dated in a calendar era. J. F. Fleet assumed 597-598 CE as the beginning of Mangalesha's reign, but this cannot be said with certainty. Therefore, the length of Kirttivarman's reign cannot be determined with certainty based on the available evidence. He seems to have ruled up to 591-592 CE.

== Inscriptions ==
The following inscriptions from Kirttivarman's reign have been discovered:

- 578 CE Badami inscription
  - Records the construction of a Vishnu temple by the king's younger brother Mangalishvara (Mangalesha)
- Godachi copper-plate inscription
  - Issued during the 12th regnal year of the king
  - Records the gift of a field to a brahmana at the request of the minister Vyaghrasvamin, who held the titles Rajya-sarvasa and Dhurandhara

Some scholars have dated the Adur inscription to his reign, but that is inscription was issued during the reign of Kirttivarman II.
