= Mahakuta Pillar =

Mahakuta pillar Inscription
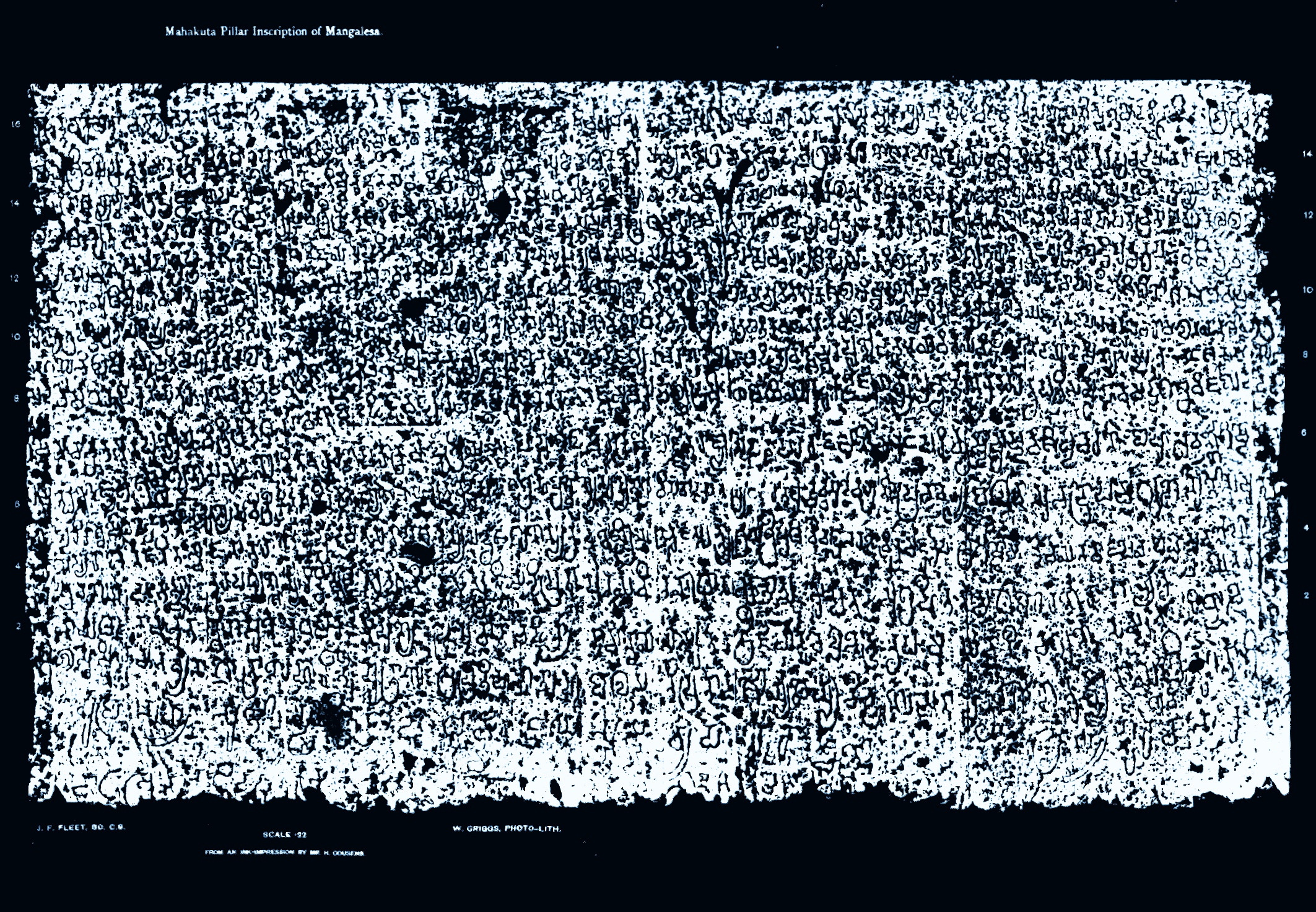
- Early Western Chalukya inscription of Mangalesa
- Material: Deep red sandstone
- Writing: Sanskrit
- Created: 12 April 602
- Discovered: 15.932953°N 75.722656°E
- Place: Mahakuta, Karnataka
- Present location: Gol Gumbaz Museum, Vijayapura (16.827048°N 75.735603°E)

Location
- Mahakuta (India) Location of Mahakuta, near Badami

The Mahakuta pillar (Kannada: ಮಹಾಕೂಟ ಸ್ತಂಭ), also known as the Makuta pillar, Magada stambha or Mangalesa Dharma Jayastambha, is a deep red sandstone pillar with an early 7th-century inscription of Early Western Chalukya era. It was found near Mahakuta group of Hindu temples near Badami, Karnataka, India. Inscribed with 16 lines of Sanskrit in Old Kannada script by king Mangalesha, it is an important and partly disputed source of historic information about the times of Badami Chalukya, the dynasty, and his influential father Pulakeshin I.

== Location ==
The pillar was found in the 19th-century lying on the ground near the ruins of Mahakutesvara temple, one of the 7th-century group of temples at the Mahakuta natural springs (Bagalkot district). The site is about 5 kilometres (3.1 mi) east from the historic cave temples of Badami. Its significance was re-discovered by colonial era archaeologists and scholars in the 1880s. The pillar was moved to Bijapur about 1920, and is now housed in the Archaeological Museum, Vijayapura.

The historical location of the Mahakuta pillar has been unclear. Henry Cousens and early scholars presumed that it was always near the Mahakuta pushkarni (natural springs tank). However, George Michell and Carol Bolon questioned this assumption. Bolon proposed that it may have been near an old temple that exists near the cliff (hill top) about a kilometer away. The problem with this suggestion is that the architecture and artwork at the cliff temple is far more crude than the remarkable finish of the Mahakuta pillar, making it likely that the cliff temple is considerably more older. According to Gary Tartakov, the temple now called Bananti Gudi is more likely site where the pillar used to be. This small two-level historic Dravida architecture temple is more consistent with the chronology, iconography and the pillar artwork, as well much closer to where Fleet found the pillar in 1880–81.

== Description ==
The Mahakuta pillar is made of fine grained, deep red sandstone. It is about 14.5 feet (4.4 m) tall, 22 inches (560 mm) in diameter and has sixteen facets. An inscription is engraved on it in Sanskrit language and Old Kannada script winding up from the base over a length of 38 inches (970 mm). The inscription consists of sixteen lines, each spirally wrapped around the sixteen faces averaging four letters per face. The pillar has no base molding. It is topped with a small amalaka with thirty six deep flutes. (Note: At the time of its re-discovery in the 1880s, the pillar was lying on the ground, and this amalaka was detached but near it; now, at the Vijayapura museum, it is displayed together in a restored form.) The amalaka is about 19 inches (480 mm) tall and 32.5 inches (830 mm) in diameter. On the top of this amalaka is a carved box with flower decoration on the sides and lotus palmette corners. (Note: For a photo of the Mahakuta pillar, see Figure 1 on page 259 of Bolon's publication.)

Mahakuta is the modern era name of the site where this pillar was found. Its earlier name, as stated in lines 9–10 of the inscription was Makuta, with Magada as the local vernacular alternate. This is not a mistake of the lipikara (scribe), because lines 13–14 repeat this term with Makutesvaranatha as the name of the temple. The pillar itself is called Dharma Jayastambha (dharma victory pillar) in the inscription. The inscription shows no signs of mutilation, only natural erosion over nearly 1,400 years. The scribe identifies the end of each line by repeating or double-repeating an aksara (letter). The Sanskrit is not perfect in the classical sense, but of a good quality with occasional mistakes. The composers tried to create metric shlokas, but lines such as 3 and 4 are not in accurate meter.

This is a "Saiva inscription", states Fleet. The pillar's primary aim is to declare the gift of an additional ten villages to the Shiva temple called Makutesvaranatha, one that already existed in 602 CE. (Note: The Early Western Chalukyan kings were also patrons of Vaishnavism and Jainism, given the Deccan temples they helped build.)

== Date ==
Lines 13–14 of the inscription allude to the date of the inscription, as "the fifth glorious year, of the constantly augmenting reign of Mangalesha, in the current Siddharatha (samvatsara) on the full moon tithi of the month Vaisakha". Scholars have interpreted this in different ways because there are several Hindu calendars and it is not obvious which one to apply here. Furthermore, the inscription uses the start of Mangalesha's reign as reference and it is unclear what that reference year should be. According to Fleet, there are three possible dates:

1. if they were using the southern Luni-solar calendar in the early 7th century, this gives samvat 522
2. the mean-sign system of the southern Hindu calendar this would be samvat 524 in the southern calendar, the equivalent of April 602 CE (per the Vaisakha month)
3. the northern Luni-solar calendar gives a date in saka samvat 525

Fleet discusses alternate dates ranging between 595 CE and 602 CE, largely based on other inscriptions and texts, preferring 602 CE. Other scholars use a combination of inscriptions and texts to determine a different reference year. Thus, KR Ramesh dates it to 595–596 CE, while Carol Bolon dates it to 602 CE.

== Inscription and translation ==
The sixteen lines of the inscription on the Mahakuta pillar was first translated by John Fleet and published in 1889. His translation is given below:

Mahakuta pillar inscription
Lines	Translation (John F Fleet)	Notes
1-2	Om ! Hail ! In the lineage of the Chalukyas, — who are of the Manavya gotra; who are Haritiputras; who are possessed of unrepulsed energy, strength, intellect, splendour, heroism, firmness, and vigour; who meditate on the feet of (their) parents; who have kindled the sacrificial fire according to due rite; who gratify supplicants according to (their) desires; (and) who generate the religious merit of many pious actions, there was born a king, the illustrious Jayasingha the chief of favorites, who, like (the god) Maghavan (Indra), was possessed of virtuous qualities, (and) who in affluence resembled (the god) Vaigravana (Kubera).	The allegorical references are to the Vedic legends in the Hindu tradition.
3–4	Resembling him in virtuous qualities and heroism and affluence, from (him who was) a very receptacle of brilliance, energy, valour, memory, intellect, splendour, polity, and refinement, there was born one who was possessed of an auspicious name, the king called Ranaraga, who by (his) fondness for war elicited the affection of his own people, and-caused vexation of mind to (his) enemies. Of that king, possessed of virtuous qualities resembling (those of his father), the dear son (was) the king who had the names of Satyasraya, the favourite of fortune and of the earth, and Ranavikrama; whose body was purified by the religious merit of ablutions performed after celebrating the agnishthoma, agnichayana, vajapeya, bahusuvarna, paundarika, and ashvamedha-sacrifices; who was descended from Hiranyagarbha (Brahman); who accepted the admonitions of the elders; who was good to Brahmins; who was a speaker of the truth; (and) who never broke (his) promises.	The Vedic rituals in vogue in 6th-century are mentioned, establishing that Vedic culture was well established in Karnataka by the 6th-century, that Pulikesin I and Badami Chalukya dynasty kings were Hindus; Fleet's translation and interpretation on Hiranyagarbha descent has been disputed by later scholars such as D.C. Sircar.
5–6	Of him, whose mind delighted in religion, (and) whose majesty resembled that of Vasudeva, there were born two sons, whose virtuous qualities resembled those of Balabhadra and Vasubhadra. The elder (was) he who was fond of (his) name of Paru-Ranaparakrama, which was rendered illustrious by a multitude of most excellent virtues; who was endowed with sovereignty acquired by the strength and prowess of his own arm; whose choice feet were rubbed and scrubbed by the jeweled diadems of hostile kings (bowing down before him); (and) whose body was purified by the religious merit of ablutions performed after celebrating the bahusuvarna and agnishthoma sacrifices.	Reference to Vasudeva and Krishna-legends; again a mention of Vedic rituals for the kings
7–8	When he, having acquired victory by crushing the array of many hostile kings commencing with those of Vanga, Anga, Kalinga, Vatttura, Magadha, Madraka, Kerala, Gangs, Mushaka, Pandya, Dramila, Choliya, Aluka, and Vaijayanti, had ascended to the skies, there was (his) younger brother, the king who has the appellations of Uru-Ranavikranta, and Mangalesha, and chief of favorites of fortune and of the earth; who meditates on the feet of gods, Brahmins, and spiritual preceptors; who is the fall-moon of the sky which is the race of the Chalukyas; who is endowed with polity, refinement, knowledge, liberality, kindness, and civility; who is a, king resembling a group of water-lilies, being an object of desire to crowds of warriors, being surrounded by young damsels, being full of charming qualities, being enlightened by (his) excellent religious merit, and being the abode of majesty,	A useful list of dynasties in 6th-century Greater India; also valuable are the listed normative values expected in Indian kings; later scholars dismiss the "crushing", "hostile kings" and such claims as poetic exaggeration, unreliable and a hagiographic myth; this analysis is based on other Badami Chalukya inscriptions, texts and the evidence from other parts of 6th and 7th-century India
9–10	just as the group of water-lilies is an object of desire to crowds of birds, is surrounded by female bees, is full of blossoms, is caused to expand by the rays of the sun, and is the abode of (the goddess) 'Sri; who is as pleasing as a group of water-lilies; whose heroism has for (its) faultless eye (his) servants the spies who are intent upon scorching up the whole aggregate of the fear, (that displays itself) in the multitude of the faces of (his) enemies, who has exterminated (other) lion-like kings with the majesty and vigour and speed of (his) forearm; (and) who is well skilled in counsel, in (the selection of) spies and messengers, in (arranging) peace and war, in encamping and in moving forward, in attacking in the rear, in the invasion of territories, in the construction of fortresses, and in the apportioning of honours among country-people and townsfolk. What need is there to say much more ? He is as difficult of assault as (the god) Mahendra; like Rama, he has never been conquered; he is as liberal as Sibi, the son of Ugnara; like Yudhishthira, he is faithful to his promises; he is possessed of fortune, just as the god) Vasudeva (Krishna) is possessed of (his wife, the goddess) Sri; like Mandhatri, he is possessed of fame; in intellect he is equal to Brihaspati and Usanas; he is as profound as the ocean; in endurance he is equal to the earth; (and) he is the ornament of the earth.	The king is compared to many of the famous Hindu legends about mythical dharmic kings such as Rama; the Sibi legend is also found in Buddhist and Jain texts
11–12	And he, — having set (his) heart upon the conquest of the northern region, (and) having conquered king Buddha, (and) having taken possession of all his substance, (and), with an eager desire to set up a pillar of victory of (his) prowess on the bank of (the river) Bhagirathi, having determined in (his) mind that in the first place indeed there should be set up the prowess" of a pillar of victory of religion, calls (to his presence) the royal lady named Durlabha(devi), his own father's wife [stepmother], who is fit and worthy to follow (his) lead in the matter; who, like Damayanti, was a most devoted wife; who was the ornament of the Batpura family; (and) whose body has been purified by participating, in the rewards of a variety of religious actions, and informs (her) of this (assignment of authority	More references to Hindu legends; The king Buddha mentioned is not to be confused with one who founded Buddhism; this is Buddharaja of the Kalachuri dynasty.
13–14	The wealth of the Kalatsuri has been expended in the idol-procession of the temple of (Our) own god. And (therefore) this property, which at (their) own idol-procession was assigned by our father [Pulikesin] and elder brother [Kirtivarman] to (the god) Makutesvaranatha, — supplement it, by (bestowing the) enjoyment of the ten villages headed by Sriyambataka, (.... lost ....), Vrihimukhagrama, Kesuvolala, Kendoramanya, and Nandigrama. Accordingly, in the fifth glorious year of (his) constantly augmenting reign, in the current Siddhartha (sarkivatsara), on the full-moon day of (the month) Vailiakha, (in commemoration of the grant of the villages in question) he has set up this Dharma Jayastambha (column of victory of religion).	Affirms that temple chariot tradition for idol-procession was already in vogue by the 6th-century; also mentions the existence of a Makutesvara temple by c. 600 CE (must be the older version near the hill top, not the one with same name built in late 7th-century, see discussion below); (Note: the village Kesuvolala mentioned in these lines is – based on other inscriptions found in this region – same as the famous Pattadakal)
15–16	And it has been said in the writings of religion, The earth has been enjoyed by many kings, commencing with Sagara; whosoever at any time possesses the earth, to him belongs at that time the reward. (of this grant that is now made, if he continue it)! The giver of land enjoys happiness in heaven for sixty thousand years; (but) the confiscator of a grant, and he who assents (to an act of confiscation), shall dwell for the same number of years in hell !	Affirms the expansion of an older grant to the temple

== Significance ==
The Mahakuta pillar and its date is important as it helps date other dynasties mentioned, the chronology of kings within the Early Western Chalukya dynasty, how and when the different temple architecture styles evolved in Badami-Mahakuta-Pattadakal-Aihole region of Karnataka.

At first blush, the pillar was linked to the temple it was found near, namely the Mahakutesvara temple. However, this is a fairly sophisticated form of Dravida architecture. It led to theories that the Dravida architecture was quite advanced by 602 CE. The colonial era archaeologist and historian Henry Cousens stated that the fine, fluted Mahakuta pillar suggests that construction techniques were fairly advanced, and therefore likely went with the advanced Mahakutesvara temple near where it was found. George Michell and others questioned this, and suggested that the pillar may be referring to an older temple with the same name, one mentioned by Fleet and Cousens in their footnotes of 1880s publications. In the late 1970s, Carol Bolon identified two temples, one named Hire Mahakutesvara (elder temple near the hill top nearby, likely completed between 565–602 CE) and the other Hosa Mahakutesvara (larger temple near the Mahakuta natural springs tank, likely completed in the second half of the 7th-century, close to 685 CE). Bolon's chronology fits better with generally accepted chronology of Dravida architecture.

According to the Mahakuta pillar inscription, the dynasty commenced with Jayasimha I, followed by Ranaraga. Then came Pulakeshin I who had two sons, Kirtivarman I and Mangalesha. The inscription does not mention the word Pulakeshin I, Line 4 of the inscription confirms that Pulakeshin I was also called Ranavikrama (lit. valorous in war) and Satyashraya (lit. home of truth).

Some of the conquests, wars and attacks mentioned in the Mahakuta pillar inscription has been used as a reliable record. The inscription states, for example, that Kirtivarman I conquered many kingdoms such as Vanga, Kalinga (Odisha and nearby regions), Anga, Vattura, Magadha (Bihar and nearby region), Madraka, Kerala (Southwest coastline), Gangas, Mushaka (Malabar and nearby), Pandya, Dramila, Choliya (Chola, Tamil Nadu and nearby), Aluka (Alupas) and Vaijayanti (Banavasi). However, scholars generally dismiss much in this inscription as fiction or exaggeration. These claims are unreliable, states K.V. Ramesh, as they not supported by inscriptions, texts and later records found in and away from Early Western Chalukya region. According to Ramesh, Kirtivarman may have conquered only the Alupas in coastal Karnataka, the Banavasi Kadambas and the Mauryas of Konkan and he dismisses the rest as exaggeration.

According to Dineshchandra Sircar, historic texts and prashasti inscriptions, such as the one in the Mahakuta pillar, mix historical truths with too much fabrication in their attempt to flatter and eulogize their rulers for the gifts they received in turn. These exaggerations and allegations limit their historical value and must be used with a lot of care. It is "impossible to believe", states Sircar, that Kirtivarman I even invaded all the kingdoms mentioned in this inscription because they are so far from the Badami-region in different directions. Furthermore, other inscriptions of this same dynasty, including one issued during the rule of his own son Pulakesin II contradict this wildly exaggerated claims. Thus, many parts of this inscription cannot be taken at face value or being even partially true, but reflect mere "imagination" and "fabrication" by the beneficiary of the gift and his scribe.

According to Harle, there may be some useful information in the Mahakuta pillar. For example, given the controversies and disagreements on relative chronology of Dravida architecture, the Mahakuta pillar "probably" provides a terminus ante quem (early 6th-century) for the construction of the early temples in this region and the Mahakutesvara temple. Similarly, it is another source for establishing the use of Sanskrit and the popular epithets in 6th-century for eulogized kings.

According to Tratakov, for Indian architecture historians, the Mahakuta pillar is an important monument. It helps set a chronology for the innovations and creativity in the Tungabhadra cradle of Indian art. Along with about 30 ruins of Hindu temples that exist in Mahakuta, and numerous more in nearby sites of Badami, Aihole and others, it helps fix the relative decades and century for innovations that unfolded.

== Bibliography ==
- Gary Tartakov (1985). Fredrick Asher; G.S. Gai (eds.). Indian Epigraphy: Its Bearing on the History of Art. Oxford University Press. ISBN 978-0-8364-1356-4.
- Carol Bolon (1979). "The Mahākuṭa Pillar and Its Temples". Artibus Asiae. 41 (2/3): 253–268. doi:10.2307/3249519. JSTOR 3249519.
- John F Fleet (1881). "Sanskrit and Old-Canarese Inscriptions". Indian Antiquary: A Journal of Oriental Research. 10: 102–104.,
- John F Fleet (1890). "Sanskrit and Old-Canarese Inscriptions No. 185 - Mahakuta Pillar Inscription of Mangalesa". Indian Antiquary. 19: 7–20.,
- Nayak, B.U.; Ghosh, N.C.; Rao, S.R. (1992). New Trends in Indian Art and Archaeology. Aditya Prakashan. ISBN 978-81-85689-12-8.
- George Michell (1973). "Dating the Mahakutesvara Temple at Mahakuta". Oriental Art. XIX (2).
- J Harle (1972). Pratapaditya Pal (ed.). Aspects of Indian Art: Papers Presented in a Symposium at the Los Angeles County Museum of Art, October, 1970. Brill. ISBN 978-90-04-03625-3.
- Pollock, S. (2006). The Language of the Gods in the World of Men: Sanskrit, Culture, and Power in Premodern India. University of California Press. ISBN 978-0-520-93202-9.
- Schastok, S.L. (1985). The Śāmalājī Sculptures and 6th Century Art in Western India. Philosophia Antiqua. Brill. ISBN 978-90-04-06941-1.
- K.V. Ramesh, Chalukyas of Vatapi, 1984, Agam Kala Prakashan, Delhi
- Sircar, D. (1971). Studies in the Religious Life of Ancient and Medieval India. Motilal Banarsidass. ISBN 978-81-208-2790-5.
- Sircar, D.C. (1996). Indian Epigraphy. Epigraphy, Palaeography, Numismatics Series. Motilal Banarsidass. ISBN 978-81-208-1166-9.
- Gary Tartakov (1980). "The Beginning of Dravidian Temple Architecture in Stone". Artibus Asiae. 42 (1): 39–99. doi:10.2307/3250008. JSTOR 3250008.
