= Mangalesha =

Chalukya Emperor from 592 to 610

- Shri-prithvi-vallabha, Maharaja

Chalukya king
- Reign: c. 592 – c. 610
- Predecessor: Kirttivarman I
- Successor: Pulakeshin II
- Dynasty: Chalukyas of Vatapi
- Father: Pulakeshin I

Mangalesha (IAST: Maṅgaleśa, r. c. 592 – c. 610 CE) was a king of the Chalukya dynasty of Vatapi in Karnataka, India. He succeeded his older brother Kirttivarman I on the throne, and ruled a kingdom that stretched from southern Gujarat in north to Bellary-Kurnool region in the south, in the western part of the Deccan region. It included parts of present-day Gujarat, Maharashtra, Goa, Karnataka, and Andhra Pradesh.

Mangalesha expanded the Chalukya power in present-day Gujarat and Maharashtra after defeating the Kalachuri king Buddharaja. He also consolidated his rule in the Konkan coastal region of Maharashtra and Goa after conquering Revati-dvipa from the rebel Chalukya governor Svamiraja. His reign ended when he lost a war of succession to his nephew Pulakeshin II, a son of Kirttivarman I.

Mangalesha was a Vaishnavite, and constructed a Vishnu temple during the reign of his brother Kirttivarman I. He was tolerant of other sects, as evident by the Mahakuta Pillar inscription, which records his gift to a Shaivite shrine.

== Names and titles ==
The name "Mangalesha" literally means "prosperous lord". Several variants of this name appear in the dynastic records, including Mangaleshvara, Mangalisha, Mangalaraja, and Mangalarnava ("ocean of auspiciousness"). The 578 CE Badami inscription calls him Mangalishvara.

His regal titles included Shri-prithvi-vallabha, Maharaja, Rana-vikranata ("puissant in war"), and Uru-rana-vikranta ("puissant like Uru in war").

== Early life ==
Mangalesha was a son of the Chalukya king Pulakeshin I. His Mahakuta Pillar inscription refers to Pulakeshin's wife Durlabha-devi as his "father's wife", which suggests that Durlabha-devi was his step-mother.

Mangalesha succeeded his elder brother Kirttivarman I, who was probably his half-brother, and who was survived by at least three underage sons. The inscriptions of the later Chalukyas of Kalyani claim that Mangalesha "took upon himself the burden of administration" because Kirttivarman's son Pulakeshin II was a minor. However, these inscriptions also wrongly claim that Mangalesha returned the kingdom to Pulakeshin II when Pulakeshin II grew up, praising the Chalukya lineage for such exemplary behaviour. This claim is contradicted by Pulakeshin II's own Aihole inscription, and appears to be a late attempt to gloss over Pulakeshin II's overthrow of Mangalesha. It is possible that Mangalesha initially ruled as a regent, but later decided to usurp the throne.

Historian K. V. Ramesh theorizes that Mangalesha administered the kingdom during the lifetime of Kirttivarman, who remained pre-occupied with military campaigns. According to Ramesh, Kirttivarman and Mangalesha may have taken turns in alternately administering the kingdom and leading military campaigns.

== Period ==
Mangalesha's own inscriptions are not dated in any specific calendar era, which makes the determination of his exact regnal period uncertain. Kirttivarman's last extant inscription is dated 578 CE (year 500 of the Shaka era), so Mangalesha's reign must have started sometime after this year. J. F. Fleet assigned the beginning of Mangalesha's reign to 597-598 CE based on his reading of the Mahakuta Pillar inscription, but this view is no longer considered correct.

The 610-611 CE Goa inscription, issued by the Chalukya vassal Satyashraya Dhruvaraja Indravarman, was probably issued during the reign of Mangalesha, and can be used to determine his regnal period. The vassal chief, who was stationed at Revatidvipa, served as the governor of four vishaya-mandalas (districts), and is described as the crest-jewel of the Adi-Bappura family. The inscription does not mention the name of the overlord, simply referring to him by his title Shri-prithvi-vallabha. This title was used by the Chalukya rulers of Vatapi, and the seal of the inscription features the Chalukya boar emblem. The record is dated to the 20th regnal year; this regnal year is most probably that of the overlord, as petty vassals and governors did not issue records dated in their own regnal years. Some scholars, such as D. C. Sircar, have theorized that the inscription was dated to the vassal's regnal year, but this is unlikely considering the fact that the vassal sought the sanction of his overlord to make the gift recorded in the inscription. The overlord could not have been Mangalesha's predecessor Kirttivarman I, as he is known to have been ruling in 567 CE, and therefore, 611 CE could not have been his 20th regnal year. The overlord could not have been Mangalesha's successor Pulakeshin either, as Pulakeshin's reign is known to have commenced in 610-611 CE (Shaka year 532). According to the Aihole prashasti inscription of Pulakeshin, Revatidvipa was annexed to the Chalukya kingdom by Mangalesha; therefore, Mangalesha is likely to be the overlord mentioned in the Goa inscription. Thus, if the Goa inscription is dated to the 20th regnal year of Mangalesha, he must have ascended the throne in 591-592 (Shaka year 513).

An inscription of Pulakeshin is dated 613 CE (Shaka year 534), and was issued during the third year of his reign. So, the end of Mangalesha's reign can be assigned to c. 610-611 CE.

== Military campaigns ==
Find spots of the inscriptions issued during the reign of Mangalesha

Mangalesha launched extensive military campaigns aimed at expanding the Chalukya power. The Mahakuta Pillar inscription suggests that he wanted to expand the Chalukya kingdom northwards, and planned to set up a pillar of victory on the banks of the Bhagirathi river (Ganges). He set up the Mahakuta Pillar in Vatapi as a preparatory step towards this objective. He could not achieve this particular objective in the coming years, but nevertheless, oversaw substantial expansion of the Chalukya kingdom. Even the Aihole inscription of his rival Pulakeshin extols his gallant qualities.

In the north, Mangalesha's kingdom extended to present-day southern Gujarat and Nashik region of Maharashtra. In the south, he retained the territory inherited from his predecessor, maintaining control over northern Karnataka, up to Bellary (Karnataka) and Kurnool (Andhra Pradesh) in the south.

=== Victory over the Kalachuris ===
According to the Chalukya inscriptions, Mangalesha defeated the Kalachuris, who were the northern neighbours of the Chalukyas. The Mahakuta Pillar inscription suggests that Mangalesha defeated the Kalachuri ruler Buddharaja sometime before the 5th or the 7th regnal year of Mangalesha, that is, before 597 CE or 599 CE. However, the victory referred to in this particular inscription was probably just a successful raid or a conquest of the southernmost Kalachuri territories, as Buddha-raja is known to have ruled until at least 609 CE. Buddharaja's rule over the Nashik region is attested by his 608-609 CE Vadner grant inscription, and his rule over the Gujarat area is attested by his 609-610 CE Sarsavani inscription. No records of the Kalachuri dynasty are available after 609-610 CE, and Mangalesha's successor Pulakeshin is known to have been in control of the former Kalachuri territory.

The Nerur inscription states that the Kalachuris possessed elephants, horses, infantry, and treasure. The Mahakuta Pillar inscription states that Mangalesha deprived Buddha of all his possessions, and that the wealth of the "Kalatsuris" (Kalachuris) was spent on the idol procession of a temple (probably the Mahakuta temple). The Aihole prashasti inscription states that Mangalesha "raised canopies of dust on the shores of the eastern and the western ocean", and "enjoyed the Kalachuris' ladies along with their prosperity".

Since the Chalukya records do not mention that Pulakeshin defeated the Kalachuris, scholars such as D. P. Dikshit and D. C. Sircar believe that Mangalesha defeated the Kalachuris decisively towards the end of his reign. Others, such as V. V. Mirashi and Ronald M. Davidson, believe that Pulakeshin, whose reign started around 610 CE, was responsible for the end of the Kalachuri dynasty.

=== Conquest of the Revati island ===
Mangalesha conquered the Revati island ("Revati-dvipa"), which is identified with present-day Redi, Maharashtra. The Aihole prashasti inscription states that Mangalesha's navy, which was like the army of the deity Varuna, conquered the island. The later Chalukya inscriptions mention that Mangalesha's troops crossed the sea by a bridge made of boats.

The ruler of Revatidvipa was probably Svamiraja, who according to the Nerur inscription, was defeated by Mangalesha. The Nerur inscription does not refer to the Revatidvipa, but suggests that Svamiraja was the governor of the Konkan coastal region, in which Revatidvipa was located. Svamiraja was prince of the Chalukya ancestry, and had won 18 battles. He may have been appointed as the governor of Konkan by Mangalesha's predecessor Kirttivarman after the Chalukya conquest of the region. Svamiraja may have rebelled against Mangalesha, and probably sided with Pulakeshin in the subsequent Chalukya war of succession. For this reason, Mangalesha may have defeated and killed him.

Subsequently, Mangalesha may have appointed Satyashraya Dhruvaraja Indravarman as the new governor of the Konkan region. The Goa inscription of this governor refers to a Chalukya monarch by the title Shri-prithvi-vallabha Maharaja: this monarch was most probably Mangalesha. The inscription records the grant of the Karellika village located in the situated in the Khetahara desha (country) to Brahmanas; Khetahara is identified with modern Khed.

== Conflict with Pulakeshin ==
Mangalesha was overthrown by his nephew Pulakeshin II, who was a son of his elder brother and predecessor Kirttivarman I. This is attested by Pulakeshin's Aihole inscription. How exactly this happened is not clear, as the Aihole inscription gives an enigmatic description of the episode: it states that Mangalesha was envious of Pulakeshin, because Pulakeshin was a favourite of Lakshmi (the goddess of fortune). Therefore, Pulakeshin, decided to go into exile. Subsequently, Mangalesha's became weak "on all sides" as Pulakeshin applied his "gifts of good counsel and energy". Ultimately, Mangalesha had to abandon three things simultaneously: his attempt to secure the throne for his own son (or his ability to perpetuate his own descent), his kingdom, and his own life.

The above description suggests that Mangalesha rejected Pulakeshin's claim to the throne, forcing Pulakeshin to go into exile, and possibly appointed his own son as the heir apparent. During his exile, Pulakeshin planned an attack on Mangalesha, and ultimately defeated and killed him.

The undated Peddavaduguru inscription records Pulakeshin's grant of the Elpattu Simbhige village after his subjugation of Ranavikrama. According to one theory, this Ranavikrama was Mangalesha (who bore the title "Ranavikrama"), who was defeated by Mangalesha in a battle fought at Elpattu Simbhige. However, another theory identifies Ranavikrama as a Bana king.

Because Pulakeshin's descendants subsequently ruled the kingdom, Mangalesha's achievements were sidelined in the subsequent records of the dynasty.

== Personal life ==
The ruler referred to by his title Prithvi-vallabha Maharaja in the Mudhol inscription may have been Mangalesha. This inscription states that Pugavarman was the son of this ruler. It is possible that Mangalesha initially ruled as a regent for Pulakeshin, but later usurped the throne, and appointed his own son as the crown prince, leading to a rebellion by Pulakeshin.

The Mahakuta Pillar inscription states that Mangalesha was "endowed with virtues of polity, refinement, knowledge, liberality, kindness, and civility". It describes him as the crest jewel of the Chalukya dynasty, and states that he possessed Shri, the goddess of wealth. It him to legendary and mythological heroes, stating that he was as unassailable as Mahendra, as unconquered as Rama, as liberal as Shibi, as faithful to his words as Yudhishthira, as fortunate as Vasudeva, as famous as Mandhatr, and as intelligent as Brihaspati. The inscription also extols his braveness, stating that the warriors liked him, and that he had exterminated other lion-like kings.

== Religion ==
Mangalesha appears to have been a Vaishnavite, as attested by the Nerur inscription which calls him a Parama-bhagavata ("Devotee of Vishnu"). The 578 CE Badami inscription, issued during the reign of Kirttivarman I, records the construction of Lanjishvara or Maha-Vishnu-Griha cave temple dedicated to Vishnu by Mangalesha. The inscription describes the temple as "well-proportioned and of wonderful workmanship". It is dated the Karttika Paurnamasi of Shaka year 500, that is, 31 October 578 CE. The inscription also records his gift of land to the garland-makers of the temple.

Mangalesha also seems to have patronized other Hindu sects, including Shaivism. The Mahakuta Pillar inscription records his gift of ten villages to the shrine of Maukteshvara-natha, a form of Shiva.

== Inscriptions ==
The following inscriptions from Mangalesha's reign have been discovered:

- Mahakuta Pillar prashasti inscription, issued during Mangalesha's fifth regnal year, on the full moon day of the Vaisakha month, of the Siddhartha calendar era (samvatsara). The date corresponds to 12 April 601 CE.
- Nerur copper plate inscription, which records the gift of a village to a Brahmana, and lists Mangalesha's military achievements
- The 610-611 CE Goa grant inscription of Satyashraya Dhruvaraja Indravarman was probably issued during Mangalesha's reign. This inscription records the issuer's gift of the Karellika village with the sanction of an overlord titled Shri-prithvi-vallabha Maharaja, who was probably Mangalesha. It was issued on the full moon day of the Magha month of the Shaka year 532. Assuming that the inscription was issued after 532 years of the Shaka era had expired, it can be dated to 4 January 611 CE. However, if we assume that it was issued when the 532rd year of the Shaka era was current, it can be dated to 5 July 610 CE.

The 578 CE Badami cave inscription was issued by Mangalesha during the reign of his brother Kirttivarman I.
