= Jaya (given name) =

Jaya is a feminine given name. It is also found in compound names of both male and female people.

== Notable people with this name ==
- Jaya (singer) (born 1971), Filipina pop singer
- Jaya Bachchan (born 1948), Indian actress
- Jaya Chakrabarti (born 1973), British public figure and scientist
- Jaya Guhanathan, Indian actress
- Jaya Luintel, Nepali journalist
- Jaya Prada (born 1962), Indian actress
- Jaya Seal (born 1976), Indian actress
- Jaya (Jeevuba) (born 1841), Indian devotee from the Swaminarayan sect

== Derived names ==
Female

- Jayalalithaa (born 1951), Indian actress and politician
- Jayamalini (born 1958), Indian actress
- Jayasudha (born 1958), Indian actress

Male

- Jayakatwang (died 1293), Javanese king killed during the Mongol invasion of Java
- Jayaram (born 1965), Indian actor
- Jayasimha, multiple people

== Fictional characters ==
- Jaya, a character in Avatar: The Legend of Korra that lived during Avatar Wan's time
- Jaya Ballard, a character from the Magic: The Gathering card game
- Jaya, a character from the book The Iron Ring

== See also ==
- Jaya (disambiguation)
