= Pulakeshin I =

Chalukya emperor from 543 to 566

- Satyashraya, Vallabha, Dharma-maharaja

Chalukya king
- Reign: c. 543 – c. 566
- Predecessor: Ranaraga
- Successor: Kirttivarman I
- Issue: Kirttivarman I
- Dynasty: Chalukyas of Vatapi
- Father: Ranaraga

Pulakeshin (IAST: Pulakeśin, c. 543–566) was the first sovereign ruler of the Chalukya dynasty of Vatapi (modern Badami). He ruled parts of the present-day Maharashtra and Karnataka states in the western Deccan region of India. Pulakeshin established the city of Vatapi, and performed the Ashvamedha sacrifice to assert his sovereign status. The dynasty established by him went on to rule a major part of peninsular India in the subsequent years.

== Names and titles ==
Various variants of the name "Pulakeshin" appear in the dynasty's inscriptions, including Polekeshin (Polekeśin), Polikeshin (Polikeśin), and Pulikeshin (Pulikeśin). According to historians J. F. Fleet and D. C. Sircar, the name may be a Sanskrit-Kannada hybrid word meaning "tiger-haired". K. A. Nilakanta Sastri, on the other hand, derived the name from the Sanskrit words pula or pola ("great") and keśin ("lion").

The Chalukya inscriptions confer a number of titles and epithets on Pulakeshin:

- Satyashraya (abode of truth)
- Rana-vikrama (valorous in war); appears in the Satara copper-plate inscription of Vishnuvardhana and the Godachi copper plate inscription of Klrttivarman I
- Shri-prithvi-vallabha (the husband of the goddess of fortune and the Earth i.e. Vishnu), and its variants (Vallabha, Vallabha-raja, Shri-vallabha); this title indicates paramountcy
- Maharaja (great king)
- Raja-simha (lion among kings); appears in the Altem copper-plate inscription
- Dharma-maharaja (great king of dharma); appears in the Godachi inscription

== Early life ==
Pulakeshin was the son and successor of Ranaraga, and a grandson of Jayasimha, the earliest historically attested ruler of his family. His predecessors were vassal kings, probably that of the Kadambas or the early Rashtrakutas of Manapura (not to be confused with the later imperial Rashtrakutas of Manyakheta). The records of the later Kalyani Chalukyas, who claimed descent from the Vatapi Chalukyas, name Pulakeshin's father as Vijayaditya. However, these records can be dismissed as unreliable, as the Vatapi Chalukya records explicitly name Ranaraga as Pulakeshin's father.

== Reign ==
Pulakeshin was the first sovereign ruler of his dynasty, and as such, has been termed as the "real founder" of his dynasty. Some scholars, such as K. A. Nilakanta Sastri, theorize that Pulakeshin was initially a Kadamba vassal, and later declared independence by taking control of the area around Vatapi. Others, such as Durga Prasad Dikshit, theorize that he was a feudatory of the Rashtrakutas of Manapura, and captured the former Kadamba territory as their subordinate.

The Chalukya inscriptions suggest that Pulakeshin made Vatapi his capital by constructing a fort there. His earliest inscription, issued under the title Vallabheshvara, has been discovered at Badami, and is dated to 543 CE (Shaka year 465). Pulakeshin probably ascended the throne a few years earlier, around 540.

According to his 543 Badami inscription, Pulakeshin performed Ashvamedha sacrifice. However, the early records of the dynasty do not provide any specific details about his military achievements. Historian D. C. Sircar suggested that the Chalukya military successes achieved during his reign can be attributed to his son and commander-in-chief Kirttivarman I. This suggestion is corroborated by the fact that the Chiplun inscription credits Kirttivarman I with founding the city of Vatapi. However, this statement can alternatively be explained by assuming that the construction of the Vatapi fort was started during Pulakeshin's reign and was completed during Kirttivarman's reign.

== Inscriptions ==
Find spots of the inscriptions issued during the reign of Pulakeshin I

The following inscriptions dated to Pulakeshin's reign have been discovered:

- 543 CE (Shaka year 465) Badami rock inscription
- 566-567 CE (Shaka year 488, expired) Amminabhavi stone tablet inscription, records a grant to the shrine of the deity Kalideva

== Religion ==
Epigraphic evidence suggests that Pulakeshin followed the Vedic religion. According to the Godachi inscription of his son Kirttivarman I, Pulakeshin bore the title Dharma-maharaja (great king of dharma). Historian K. A. Nilakanta Sastri theorized that this title suggests that Pulakeshin actively promoted the Vedic faith (dharma) against Buddhism and Jainism."

Pulakeshin's 543 CE Badami inscription states that he performed Ashvamedha and other sacrifices in accordance with the Shrauta (Vedic) tradition. The Mahakuta Pillar inscription of his son Mangalesha states that he performed the Agnishtoma, Agnichayana, Vajapeya, Bahusuvarna, Paundarika, Ashvamedha, and Hiranyagarbha sacrifices. The inscription describes him as a person who upholds the teachings of the brahmanas (brahmaya), heeds to the elders (vriddhopadesha-grahi), speaks the truth, and never breaks promises.

The Nerur inscription of Mangalesha states that Pulakeshin was fully knowledgeable about the Manusmriti; and had mastered the Puranas, the Ramayana, the Bharata, and other itihasa texts. It also states that he was like the deity Brihaspati in niti (politics). Other dynastic records compare him to the legendary kings of Hindu mythology, including Yayati and Dilīpa.

Pulakeshin's 566-567 CE Amminabhavi, issued under the title Satyashraya, records the grants made by him to the deity Kalideva on the occasion of a solar eclipse, on the new moon day, in the month of Vaisakha. He had his son Kirttivarman make an endowment to the shrine of god Makuteshvara-natha at Mahakuta near Badami.

== Personal life ==
Pulakeshin married Durlabha-devi, who came from the Bappura lineage. The Mahakuta pillar inscription states that she was like the legendary Damayanti in her devotion to her husband. The Aihole inscription states that Pulakeshin, "though he was the consort of Indukanti and though he was the favourite lord of Shri (the goddess of fortune), had espoused the bride of Vatapi-puri (city of Vatapi)". According to various interpretations, "Induktani" (literally "lustre of the moon") is a poetic expression or means that before the foundation of Vatapi, Pulakeshin ruled a city called Indukanti. However, it is more likely that Indukanti was the name of Pulakeshin's another queen.

Pulakeshin was succeeded by his sons, first Kirttivarman I, and then Mangalesha. Pugavarman, a Chalukya prince attested by a Mudhol inscription, is sometimes thought to be a son of Pulakeshin, but this is not certain: he may have been a son of Mangalesha.

Kirttivarman's Badami inscription, issued during his 12th regnal year, is dated to the Shaka year 500. Thus, he must have succeeded Pulakeshin in the Shaka year 488-489, that is, 566-567 CE.
