= Chalukya dynasty =

Classical Indian dynasty (543–753)

- 543–753
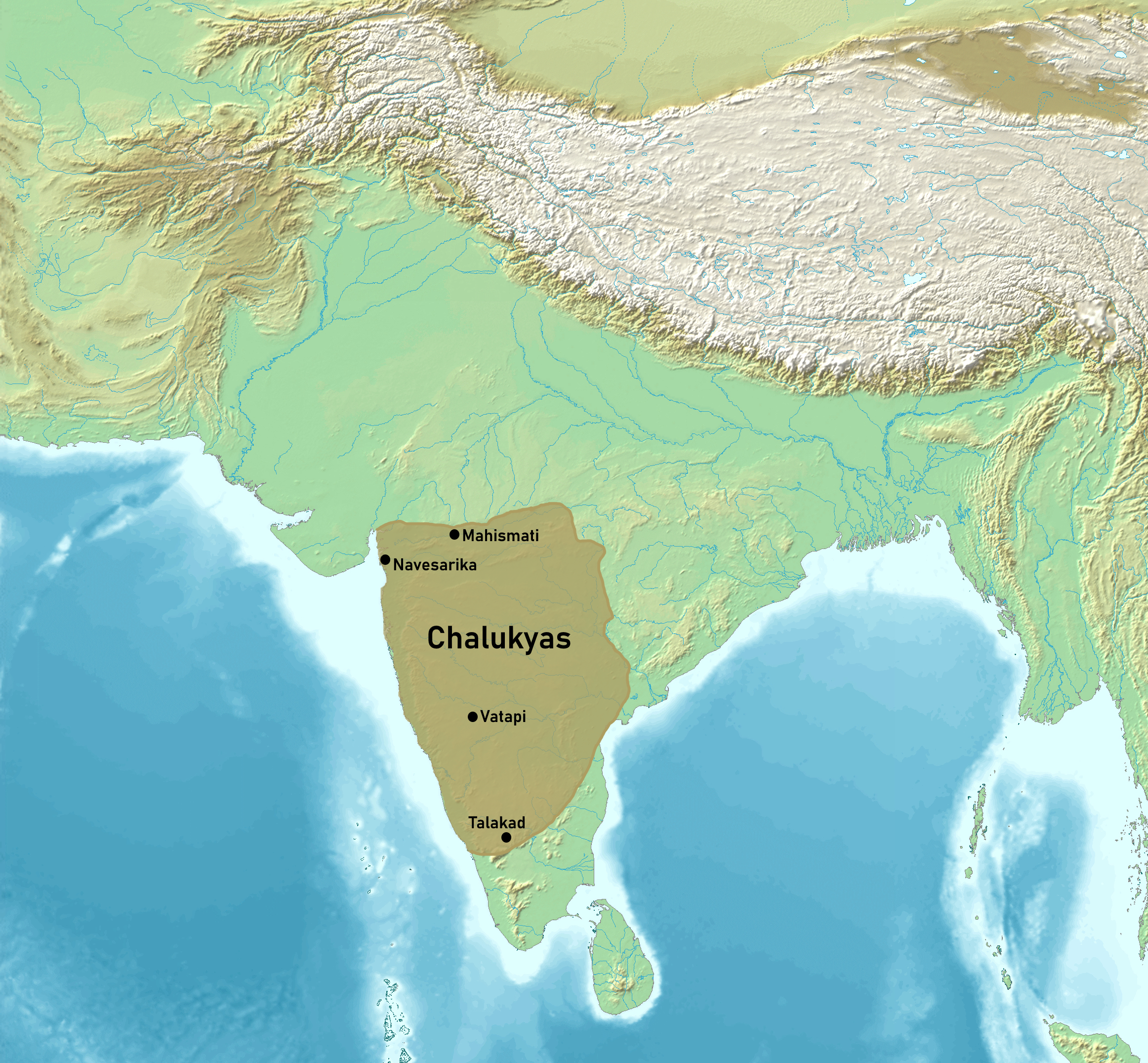
- Greatest extent of the Chalukya Empire
- Capital: Badami
- Common languages: Kannada; Sanskrit
- Religion: Hinduism; Buddhism; Jainism
- Government: Monarchy
- Maharaja
  - 543–566: Pulakeshin I
  - 746–753: Kirtivarman II
- History
  - Earliest records: 543
  - Established: 543
  - Disestablished: 753
Preceded by	Succeeded by
Kadamba dynasty	Rashtrakuta Empire; Eastern Chalukyas
- Today part of: India

The Chalukya dynasty (Kannada: [tʃaːlukjɐ]) was a Classical Indian dynasty that ruled large parts of southern and central India between the 6th and the 12th centuries. During this period, they ruled as three related yet individual dynasties. The earliest dynasty, known as the "Badami Chalukyas", ruled from Vatapi (modern Badami) from the middle of the 6th century. The Badami Chalukyas began to assert their independence at the decline of the Kadamba kingdom of Banavasi and rapidly rose to prominence during the reign of Pulakeshin II. After the death of Pulakeshin II, the Eastern Chalukyas became an independent kingdom in the eastern Deccan. They ruled from Vengi until about the 11th century. In the western Deccan, the rise of the Rashtrakutas in the middle of the 8th century eclipsed the Chalukyas of Badami before being revived by their descendants, the Western Chalukyas, in the late 10th century. These Western Chalukyas ruled from Kalyani (modern Basavakalyan) until the end of the 12th century.

The rule of the Chalukyas marks an important milestone in the history of South India and a golden age in the history of Karnataka. The political atmosphere in South India shifted from smaller kingdoms to large empires with the ascendancy of Badami Chalukyas. A Southern India-based kingdom took control and consolidated the entire region between the Kaveri and the Narmada rivers. The rise of this empire saw the birth of efficient administration, overseas trade and commerce and the development of new style of architecture called "Chalukyan architecture". Kannada literature, which had enjoyed royal support in the 9th century Rashtrakuta court found eager patronage from the Western Chalukyas in the Jain and Brahminical traditions. The 11th century saw the patronage of Telugu literature under the Eastern Chalukyas.

== Origins ==
=== Natives of Karnataka ===
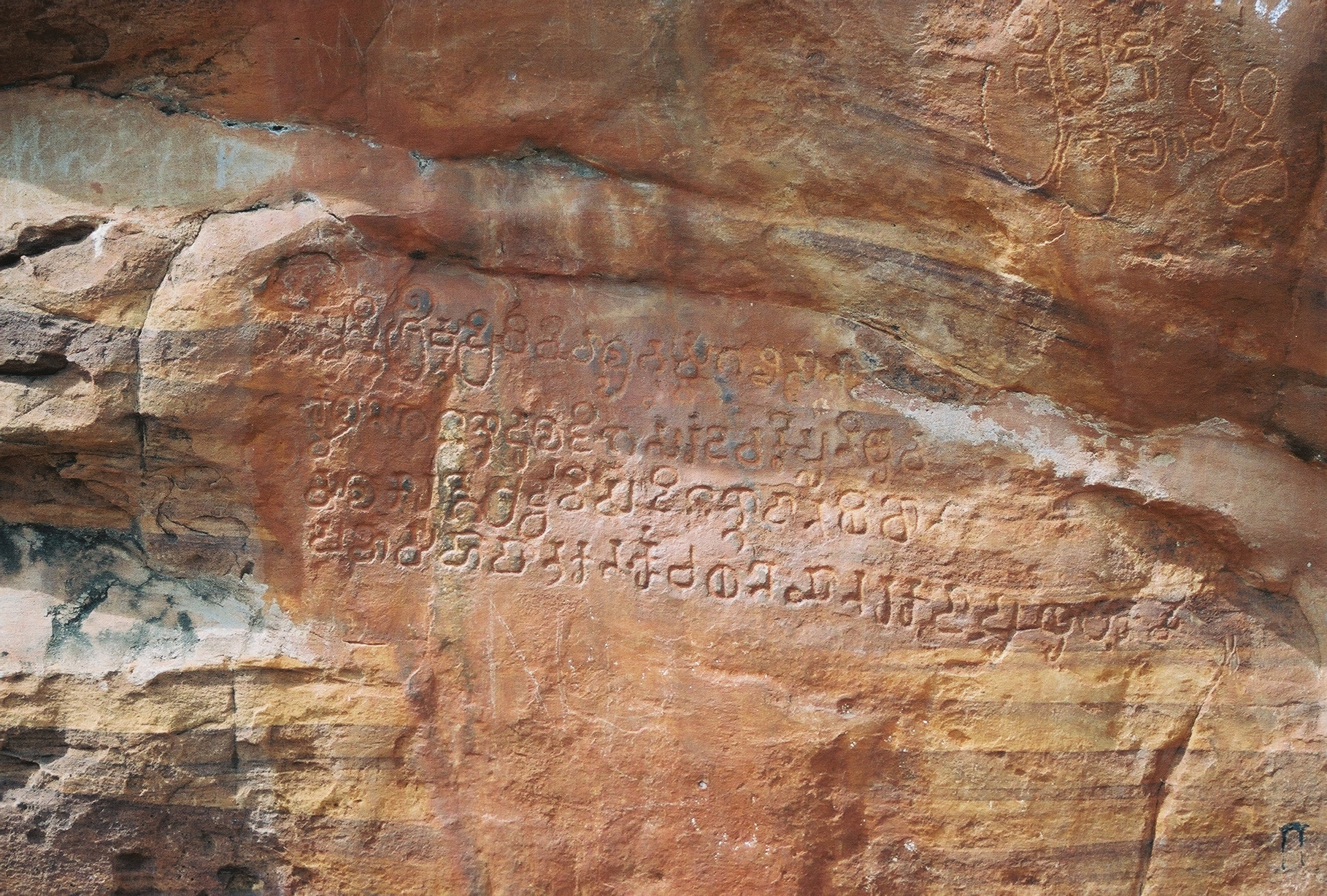
Old Kannada inscription of Chalukya King Mangalesha dated 578 AD at Badami cave temple no.3

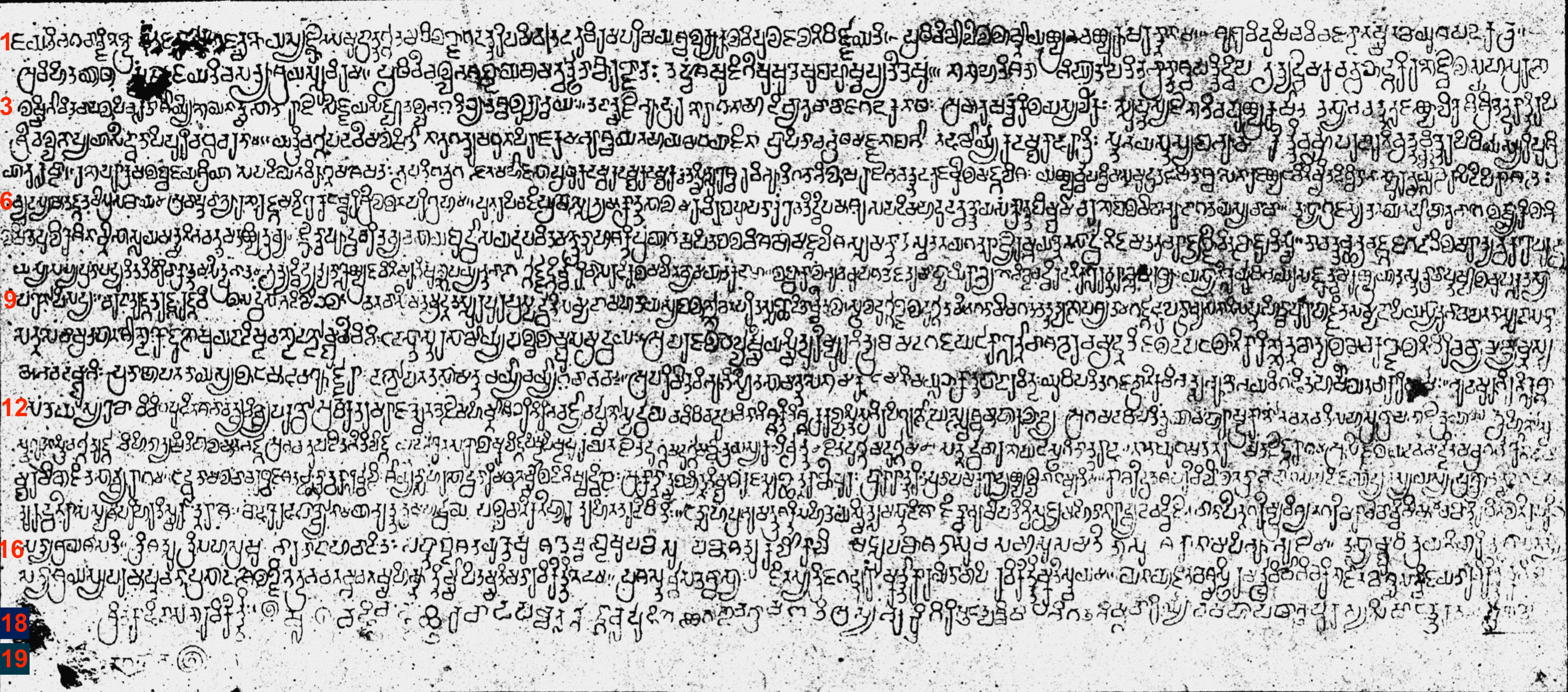
Ravikirti's inscription, Meguti Jain Basadi, Aihole which celebrates Pulakeshin II's military achievements.

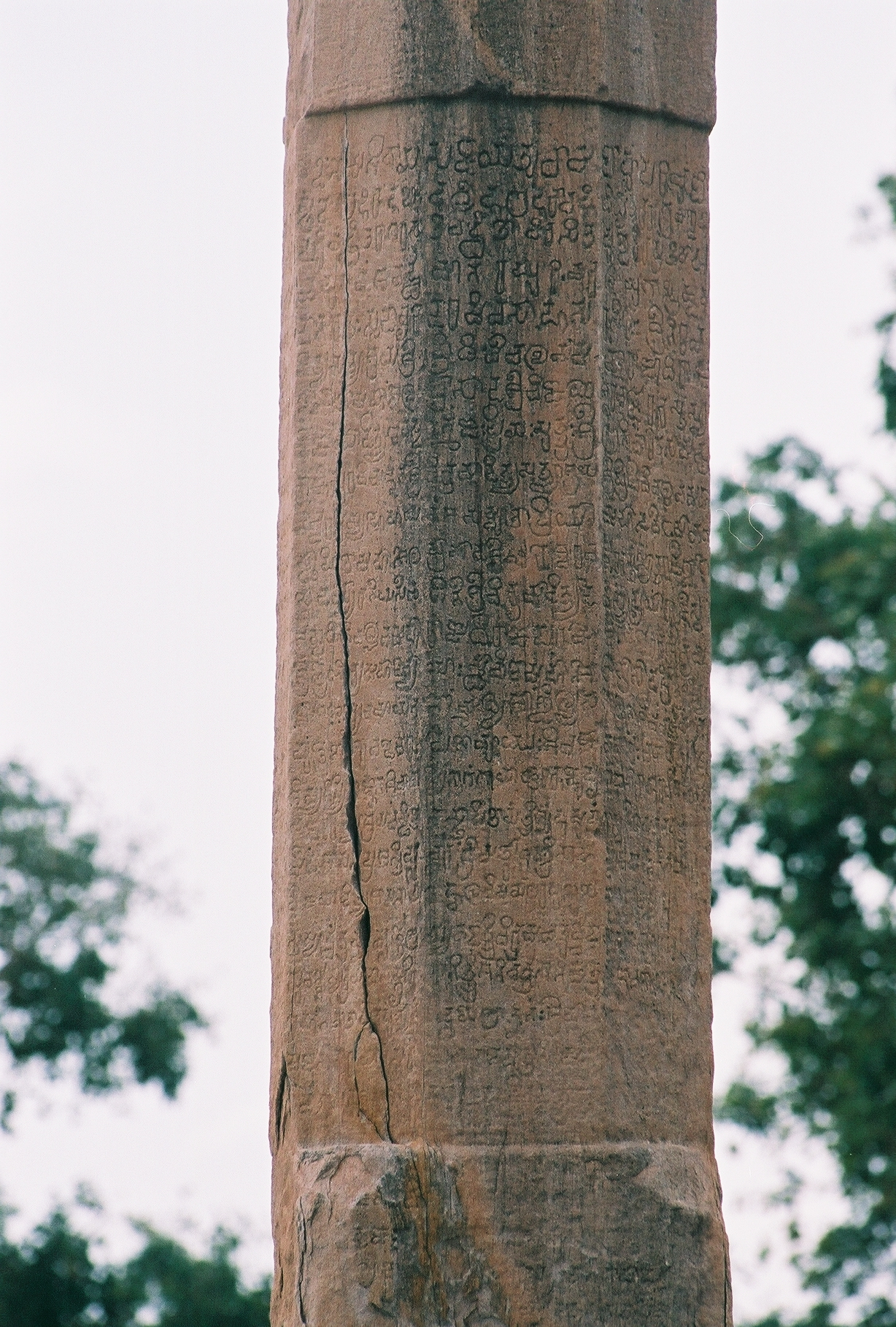
Old Kannada inscription on victory pillar, Virupaksha Temple, Pattadakal, 733–745 AD

While opinions vary regarding the early origins of the Chalukyas, the consensus among noted historians such as John Keay, D.C. Sircar, Hans Raj, S. Sen, Kamath, K. V. Ramesh and Karmarkar is that the founders of the empire at Badami were native to the modern Karnataka region.

A theory that they were descendants of a 2nd-century chieftain called Kandachaliki Remmanaka, a feudatory of the Andhra Ikshvaku (from an Ikshvaku inscription of the 2nd century) was put forward. This according to Kamath has failed to explain the difference in lineage. The Kandachaliki feudatory call themselves Vashisthiputras of the Hiranyakagotra. The Chalukyas, however, address themselves as Harithiputras of Manavyasagotra in their inscriptions, which is the same lineage as their early overlords, the Kadambas of Banavasi. This makes them descendants of the Kadambas. The Chalukyas took control of the territory formerly ruled by the Kadambas.

A later record of Eastern Chalukyas mentions the northern origin theory and claims one ruler of Ayodhya came south, defeated the Pallavas and married a Pallava princess. She had a child called Vijayaditya who is claimed to be the Pulakeshin I's father. However, according to the historians K. V. Ramesh, Chopra and Sastri, there are Badami Chalukya inscriptions that confirm Jayasimha was Pulakeshin I's grandfather and Ranaraga, his father. Kamath and Moraes claim it was a popular practice in the 11th century to link South Indian royal family lineage to a Northern kingdom. The Badami Chalukya records themselves are silent with regards to the Ayodhya origin.

While the northern origin theory has been dismissed by many historians, the epigraphist K. V. Ramesh has suggested that an earlier southern migration is a distinct possibility which needs examination. According to him, the complete absence of any inscriptional reference of their family connections to Ayodhya, and their subsequent Kannadiga identity may have been due to their earlier migration into present day Karnataka region where they achieved success as chieftains and kings. Hence, the place of origin of their ancestors may have been of no significance to the kings of the empire who may have considered themselves natives of the Kannada speaking region. The writing of 12th century Kashmiri poet Bilhana suggests the Chalukya family belonged to the Shudra while other sources claim they were born in the arms of Brahma, and hence were Kshatriya caste. According to Xuanzang, the Chalukya king Pulakeshin II was war-like and loved "military arts", because he was a Kshatriya by birth.

The historians Jan Houben and Kamath, and the epigraphist D.C. Sircar note the Badami Chalukya inscriptions are in Kannada and Sanskrit. According to the historian N. L. Rao, their inscriptions call them Karnatas and their names use indigenous Kannada titles such as Priyagallam and Noduttagelvom. The names of some Chalukya princes end with the pure Kannada term arasa (meaning "king" or "chief"). The Rashtrakuta inscriptions call the Chalukyas of Badami Karnatakabala ("Power of Karnataka"). It has been proposed by the historian S. C. Nandinath that the word "Chalukya" originated from Salki or Chalki which is a Kannada word for an agricultural implement. According to some historians, the Chalukyas originated from agriculturists.

=== Historical sources ===
Inscriptions in Sanskrit and Kannada are the main source of information about Badami Chalukya history. Among them, the Badami cave inscriptions of Mangalesha (578), Kappe Arabhatta record of c. 700, Peddavaduguru inscription of Pulakeshin II, the Kanchi Kailasanatha Temple inscription and Pattadakal Virupaksha Temple inscription of Vikramaditya II (all in Kannada language) provide more evidence of the Chalukya language. The Badami cliff inscription of Pulakeshin I (543), the Mahakuta Pillar inscription of Mangalesha (595) and the Aihole inscription of Pulakeshin II (634) are examples of important Sanskrit inscriptions written in old Kannada script. The reign of the Chalukyas saw the arrival of Kannada as the predominant language of inscriptions along with Sanskrit, in areas of the Indian peninsula outside what is known as Tamilakam (Tamil country). Several coins of the Badami Chalukyas with Kannada legends have been found. All this indicates that Kannada language flourished during this period.

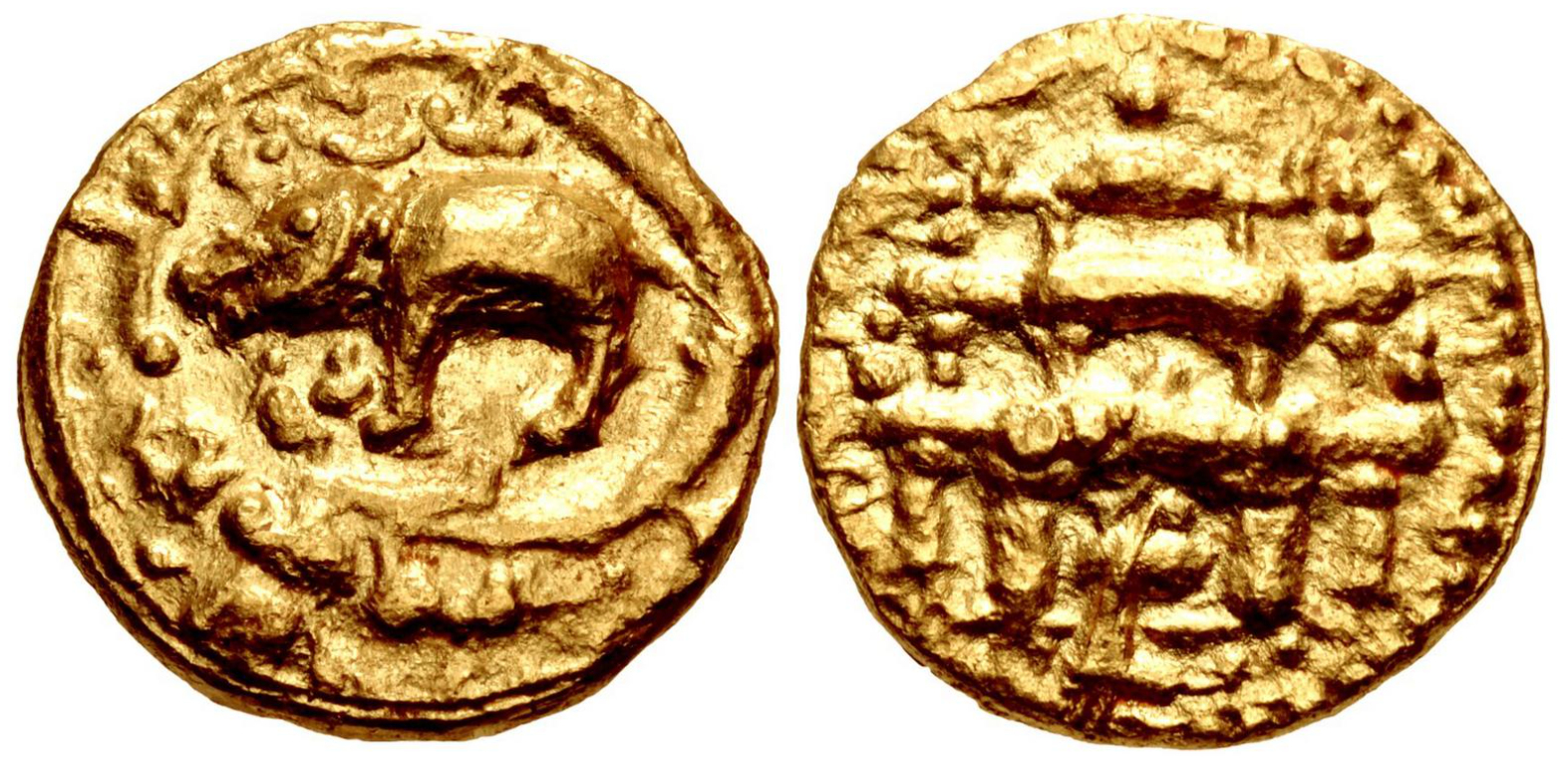
Coinage of the Chalukyas of Badami. Uncertain ruler. c. 597–757 AD. Boar and Temple type.

Travelogues of contemporary foreign travellers have provided useful information about the Chalukyan empire. The Chinese traveller Xuanzang had visited the court of Pulakeshin II. At the time of this visit, as mentioned in the Aihole record, Pulakeshin II had divided his empire into three Maharashtrakas or great provinces comprising 99,000 villages each. This empire possibly covered present day Karnataka, Maharashtra and coastal Konkan. Xuanzang, impressed with the governance of the empire observed that the benefits of the king's efficient administration was felt far and wide. Later, Persian emperor Khosrau II exchanged ambassadors with Pulakeshin II.

=== Legends ===
Court poets of the Western Chalukya dynasty of Kalyani narrate:

"Once when Brahma, the creator, was engaged in the performance of the sandhya (twilight) rituals, Indra approached and beseeched him to create a hero who could put to an end the increasing evil on earth. On being thus requested, Brahma looked steadily into the Chuluka-jala (the water of oblation in his palm) and out sprang thence a great warrior, the progenitor of the Chalukyas". The Chalukyas claimed to have been nursed by the Sapta Matrikas ("seven divine mothers") and were worshippers of many gods including Siva, Vishnu, Chamundi, Surya, Kubera, Parvati, Vinayaka and Kartikeya.

Some scholars connect the Chalukyas with the Chaulukyas (Solankis) of Gujarat. According to a myth mentioned in latter manuscripts of Prithviraj Raso, Chaulukyas were born out of fire-pit (Agnikund) at Mount Abu. However it has been reported that the story of Agnikula is not mentioned at all in the original version of the Prithviraj Raso preserved in the Fort Library at Bikaner.

According to the Nilagunda inscription of King Vikramaditya VI (11th century or later), the Chalukyas originally hailed from Ayodhya where fifty-nine kings ruled, and later, sixteen more of this family ruled from South India where they had migrated. This is repeated by his court poet Bilhana, who claims that the first member of the family, "Chalukya", was so named as he was born in the "hollow of the hands" of God Brahma. Some genealogical accounts point to an Ayodhya origin and claim that the Chalukyas belonged to the Solar dynasty.

According to a theory put forward by Lewis, the Chalukya were descendants of the "Seleukia" tribe of Iraq and that their conflict with the Pallava of Kanchi was, but a continuation of the conflict between ancient Seleukia and "Parthians", the proposed ancestors of Pallavas. However, this theory has been rejected by Kamath as it seeks to build lineages based simply on similar-sounding clan names.

== Periods in Chalukya history ==
The Chalukyas ruled over the Deccan plateau in India for over 600 years. During this period, they ruled as three closely related, but individual dynasties. These are the "Chalukyas of Badami" (also called "Early Chalukyas"), who ruled between the 6th and the 8th century, and the two sibling dynasties, the "Chalukyas of Kalyani" (also called Western Chalukyas or "Later Chalukyas") and the "Chalukyas of Vengi" (also called Eastern Chalukyas).

=== Chalukyas of Badami ===
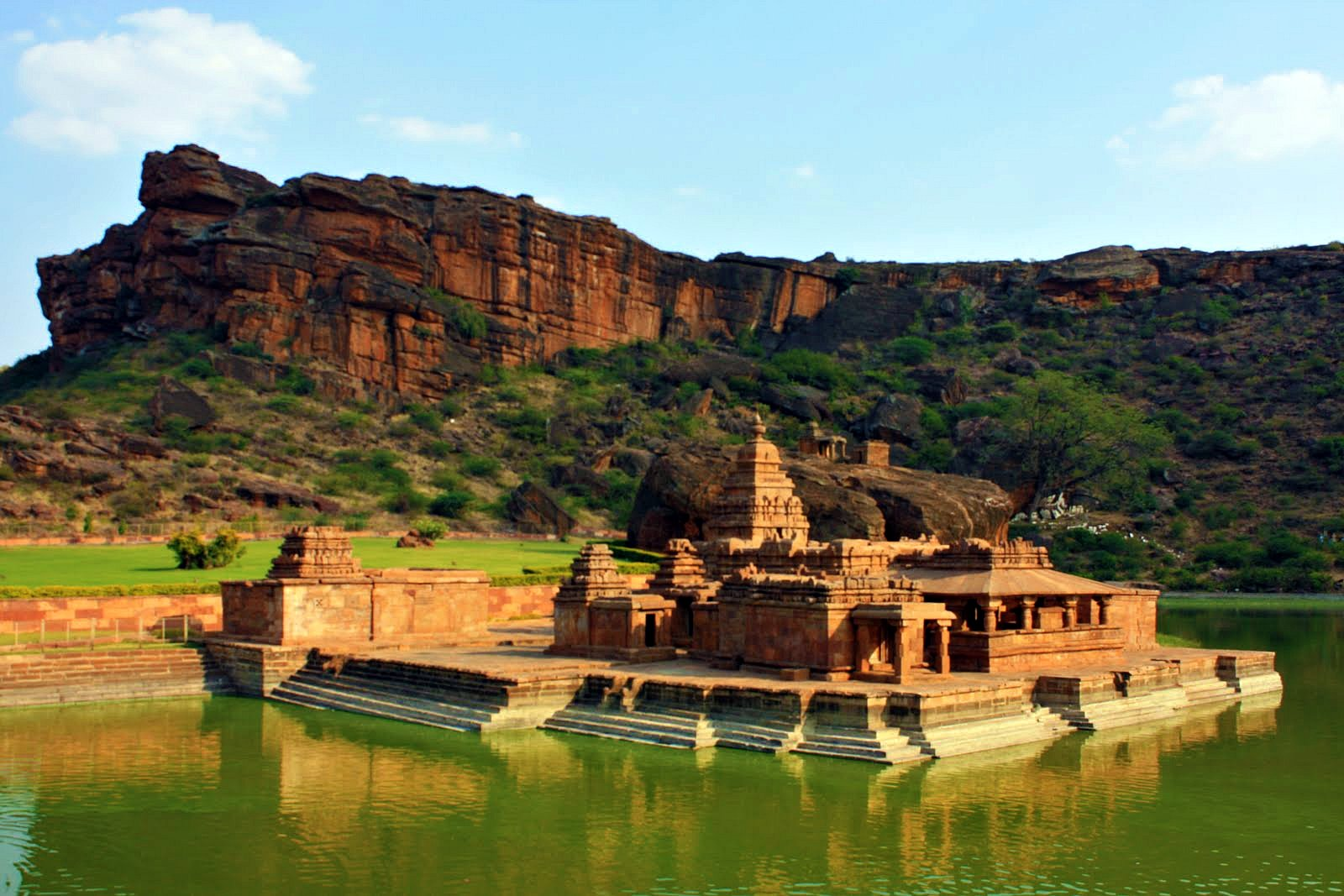
Bhutanatha temple complex, at Badami

In the 6th century, with the decline of the Gupta dynasty and their immediate successors in northern India, major changes began to happen in the area south of the Vindhyas – the Deccan and Tamilakam. The age of small kingdoms had given way to large empires in this region. The Chalukya dynasty was established by Pulakeshin I in 543. Pulakeshin I took Vatapi (modern Badami in Bagalkot district, Karnataka) under his control and made it his capital. Pulakeshin I and his descendants are referred to as "Chalukyas of Badami". They ruled over an empire that comprised the entire state of Karnataka and most of Andhra Pradesh in the Deccan.

Pulakeshin II, whose pre-coronation name was Ereya, commanded control over the entire Deccan and is perhaps the most well-known emperor of the Badami dynasty. He is considered one of the notable kings in Indian history. His queens were princess from the Alupa Dynasty of South Canara and the Western Ganga Dynasty of Talakad, clans with whom the Chalukyas maintained close family and marital relationships. Pulakeshin II extended the Chalukya Empire up to the northern extents of the Pallava kingdom and halted the southward march of Harsha by defeating him on the banks of the river Narmada. He then defeated the Vishnukundins in the south-eastern Deccan. Pallava Narasimhavarman however reversed this victory in 642 by attacking and occupying Badami temporarily. It is presumed Pulakeshin II, "the great hero", died fighting.

The Badami Chalukya dynasty went into a brief decline following the death of Pulakeshin II due to internal feuds when Badami was occupied by the Pallavas for a period of thirteen years. It recovered during the reign of Vikramaditya I, who succeeded in pushing the Pallavas out of Badami and restoring order to the empire. Vikramaditya I took the title "Rajamalla" (lit "Sovereign of the Mallas" or Pallavas). The thirty-seven year rule of Vijayaditya (696–733) was a prosperous one and is known for prolific temple building activity.

The empire was its peak again during the rule of the illustrious Vikramaditya II (733–744) who is known not only for his repeated invasions of the territory of Tondaimandalam and his subsequent victories over Pallava Nandivarman II, but also for his benevolence towards the people and the monuments of Kanchipuram, the Pallava capital. He thus avenged the earlier humiliation of the Chalukyas by the Pallavas and engraved a Kannada inscription on the victory pillar at the Kailasanatha Temple. During his reign Arab intruders of the Caliphal province of Sind invaded southern Gujarat which was under Chalukya rule, but the Arabs were defeated and driven out by Avanijanashraya Pulakeshin, the governor of the Chalukya branch of Navsari. Vikramaditya II later overran the other traditional kingdoms of Tamil country, the Pandyas, the Cholas and the Cheras in addition to subduing a Kalabhra ruler. The last Chalukya king, Kirtivarman II, was overthrown by the Rashtrakuta king Dantidurga in 753. At their peak, the Chalukyas ruled a vast empire stretching from the Kaveri in the south to the Narmada in the north.

=== Chalukyas of Kalyani ===
The Chalukyas and contemporary polities c. 576

The Chalukyas revived their fortunes in 973 after over 200 years of dormancy when much of the Deccan was under the rule of the Rashtrakutas. The genealogy of the kings of this empire is still debated. One theory, based on contemporary literary and inscriptional evidence plus the finding that the Western Chalukyas employed titles and names commonly used by the early Chalukyas, suggests that the Western Chalukya kings belonged to the same family line as the illustrious Badami Chalukya dynasty of the 6th century while other Western Chalukya inscriptional evidence indicates they were a distinct line unrelated to the Early Chalukyas.

Tailapa II, a Rashtrakuta feudatory ruling from Tardavadi – 1000 (Bijapur district) overthrew Karka II, re-established the Chalukya rule in the western Deccan and recovered most of the Chalukya empire. The Western Chalukyas ruled for over 200 years and were in constant conflict with the Cholas, and with their cousins, the Eastern Chalukyas of Vengi. Vikramaditya VI is widely considered the most notable ruler of the dynasty. Starting from the very beginning of his reign, which lasted fifty years, he abolished the original Saka era and established the Vikrama Era. Most subsequent Chalukya inscriptions are dated in this new era. Vikramaditya VI was an ambitious and skilled military leader. Under his leadership the Western Chalukyas were able to end the Chola influence over Vengi (coastal Andhra) and become the dominant power in the Deccan. The Western Chalukya period was an important age in the development of Kannada literature and Sanskrit literature. They went into their final dissolution towards the end of the 12th century with the rise of the Hoysala Empire, the Pandyas, the Kakatiya and the Seuna Yadavas of Devagiri.

=== Chalukyas of Vengi ===
Pulakeshin II conquered the eastern Deccan, corresponding to the coastal districts of modern Andhra Pradesh in 616, defeating the remnants of the Vishnukundina kingdom. He appointed his brother Kubja Vishnuvardhana as Viceroy in 621. Thus the Eastern Chalukyas were originally of Kannada stock. After the death of Pulakeshin II, the Vengi Viceroyalty developed into an independent kingdom and included the region between Nellore and Visakhapatnam.

After the decline of the Badami Chalukya empire in the mid-8th century, territorial disputes flared up between the Rashtrakutas, the new rulers of the western deccan, and the Eastern Chalukyas. For much of the next two centuries, the Eastern Chalukyas had to accept subordination towards the Rashtrakutas. Apart from a rare military success, such as the one by Vijayaditya II(c.808–847), it was only during the rule of Bhima I (c.892–921) that these Chalukyas were able to celebrate a measure of independence. After the death of Bhima I, the Andhra region once again saw succession disputes and interference in Vengi affairs by the Rashtrakutas.

The fortunes of the Eastern Chalukyas took a turn around 1000. Danarnava, their king, was killed in battle in 973 by the Telugu Choda King Bhima who then imposed his rule over the region for twenty-seven years. During this time, Danarnava's two sons took refuge in the Chola kingdom. Choda Bhima's invasion of Tondaimandalam, a Chola territory, and his subsequent death on the battlefield opened up a new era in Chola–Chalukya relations. Saktivarman I, the elder son of Danarnava was crowned as the ruler of Vengi in 1000, though under the control of king Rajaraja Chola I. This new relationship between the Cholas and the coastal Andhra kingdom was unacceptable to the Western Chalukyas, who had by then replaced the Rashtrakutas as the main power in the western Deccan. The Western Chalukyas sought to brook the growing Chola influence in the Vengi region but were unsuccessful.

Initially, the Eastern Chalukyas had encouraged Kannada language and literature, though, after a period of time, local factors took over and they gave importance to Telugu language. Telugu literature owes its growth to the Eastern Chalukyas.

== Architecture ==
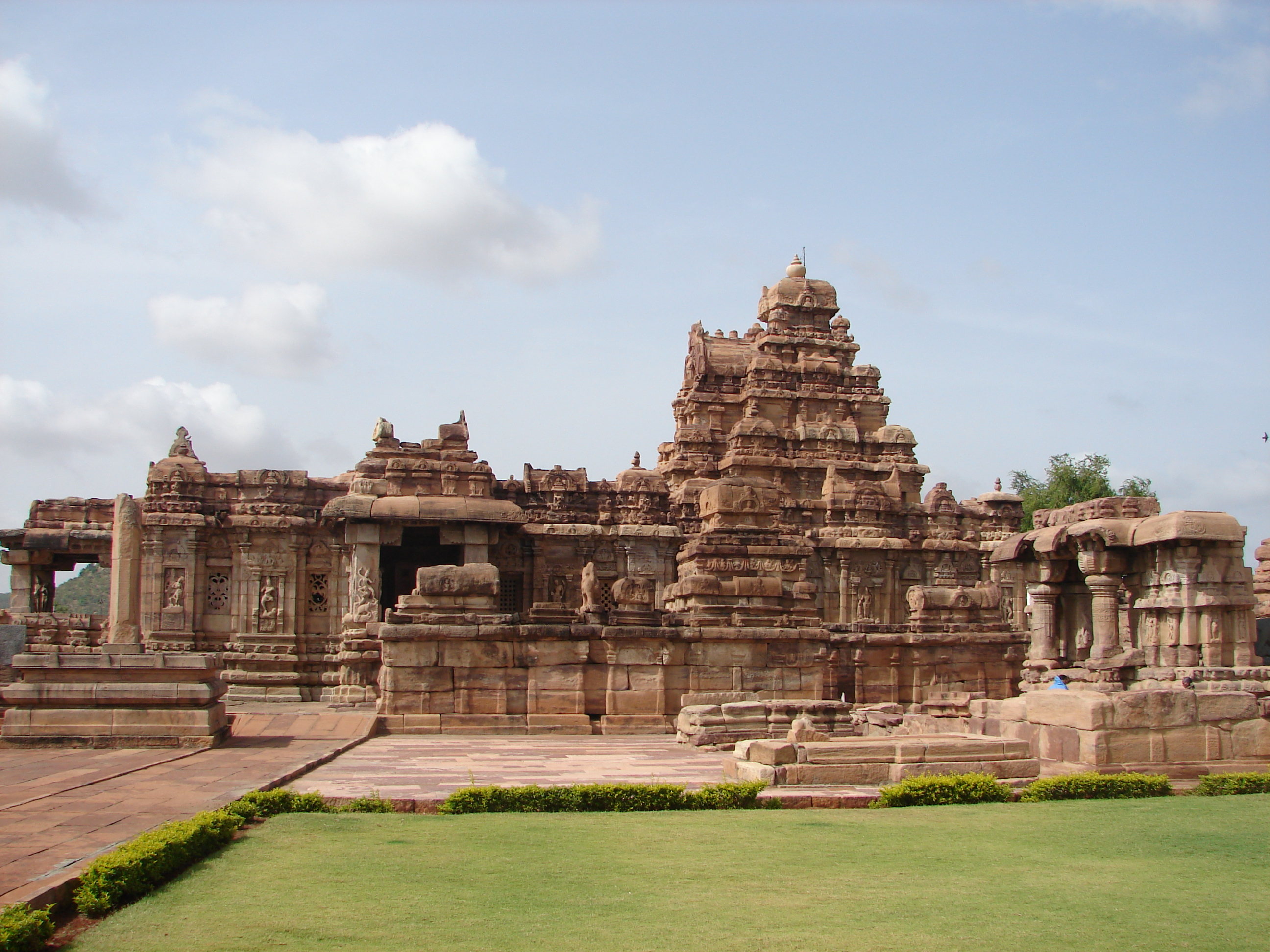
Virupaksha temple in Dravidian style at Pattadakal, built 740 CE

The Badami Chalukya era was an important period in the development of South Indian architecture. The kings of this dynasty were called Umapati Varlabdh and built many temples for the Hindu god Shiva. Their style of architecture is called "Chalukyan architecture" or "Karnata Dravida architecture". Nearly a hundred monuments built by them, rock cut (cave) and structural, are found in the Malaprabha river basin in modern Bagalkot district of northern Karnataka. The building material they used was a reddish-golden Sandstone found locally. These cave temples are basically excavations, cut out of the living rock sites they occupy. They were not built as their structural counterparts were, rather created by a special technique known as "subtraction" and are basically sculptural. Though they ruled a vast empire, the Chalukyan workshops concentrated most of their temple building activity in a relatively small area within the Chalukyan heartland – Aihole, Badami, Pattadakal and Mahakuta in modern Karnataka state.

Their temple building activity can be categorised into three phases. The early phase began in the last quarter of the 6th century and resulted in many cave temples, prominent among which are three elementary cave temples at Aihole (one Vedic, one Jain and one Buddhist which is incomplete), followed by four developed cave temples at Badami (of which cave 3, a Vaishnava temple, is dated accurately to 578 CE). These cave temples at Badami are similar, in that, each has a plain exterior but an exceptionally well finished interior consisting of a pillared verandah, a columned hall (mantapa) and a cella (shrine, cut deep into rock) which contains the deity of worship. In Badami, three caves temples are Vedic and one in Jain. The Vedic temples contain large well sculpted images of Harihara, Mahishasuramardhini, Varaha, Narasimha, Trivikrama, Vishnu seated on Anantha (the snake) and Nataraja (dancing Shiva).

The second phase of temple building was at Aihole (where some seventy structures exist and has been called "one of the cradles of Indian temple architecture") and Badami. Though the exact dating of these temples has been debated, there is consensus that the beginnings of these constructions are from c. 600. These are the Lad Khan Temple (dated by some to c. 450 but more accurately to 620) with its interesting perforated stone windows and sculptures of river goddesses; the Meguti Jain Temple (634) which shows progress in structural design; the Durga Temple with its northern Indian style tower (8th century) and experiments to adapt a Buddhist Chaitya design to a brahminical one (its stylistic framework is overall a hybrid of north and south Indian styles.); the Huccimalli Gudi Temple with a new inclusion, a vestibule, connecting the sanctum to the hall. Other dravida style temples from this period are the Naganatha Temple at Nagaral; the Banantigudi Temple, the Mahakutesvara Temple and the Mallikarjuna Temple at Mahakuta; and the Lower Sivalaya Temple, the Malegitti Sivalaya Temple (upper) and the Jambulingesvara Temple at Badami. Located outside the Chalukyan architectural heartland, 140 km south-east of Badami, with a structure related to the Early Chalukya style is the unusual Parvati Temple at Sanduru which dates to the late 7th century. It is medium-sized, 48 ft long and 37 ft wide. It has a nagara (north Indian) style vimana (tower) and dravida (south Indian) style parts, has no mantapa (hall) and consists of an antarala (vestibule) crowned with a barrel-vaulted tower (sukhanasi). The "staggered" base plan of the temple became popular much later, in the 11th century.

The structural temples at Pattadakal, built in the 8th century and now a UNESCO World Heritage Site, marks the culmination and mature phase of Badami Chalukyan architecture. The Bhutanatha group of temples at Badami are also from this period. There are ten temples at Pattadakal, six in southern dravida style and four in the northern nagara style. Well known among these are the Sangamesvara Temple (725), the Virupaksha Temple (740–745) and the Mallikarjuna Temple (740–745) in the southern style. The Papanatha temple (680) and Galaganatha Temple (740) are early attempts in the nagara – dravida fusion style. Inscriptional evidence suggests that the Virupaksha and the Mallikarjuna Temples were commissioned by the two queens of King Vikramaditya II after his military success over the Pallavas of Kanchipuram. Some well known names of Chalukyan architects are Revadi Ovajja, Narasobba and Anivarita Gunda.

The reign of Western Chalukyas was an important period in the development of Deccan architecture. Their architecture served as a conceptual link between the Badami Chalukya architecture of the 8th century and the Hoysala architecture popularised in the 13th century. The centre of their cultural and temple-building activity lay in the Tungabhadra region of modern Karnataka state, encompassing the present-day Dharwad district; it included areas of present-day Haveri and Gadag districts. Here, large medieval workshops built numerous monuments. These monuments, regional variants of pre-existing dravida temples, defined the Karnata dravida tradition.

The most notable of the many buildings dating from this period are the Mahadeva Temple at Itagi in the Koppal district, the Kasivisvesvara Temple at Lakkundi in the Gadag district, the Mallikarjuna Temple at Kuruvatti, and the Kallesvara Temple at Bagali, both in the Davangere district. Other notable constructions are the Dodda Basappa Temple at Dambal (Gadag district), the Siddhesvara Temple at Haveri (Haveri district), and the Amrtesvara Temple at Annigeri (Dharwad district). The Eastern Chalukyas built some fine temples at Alampur, in modern eastern Andhra Pradesh.

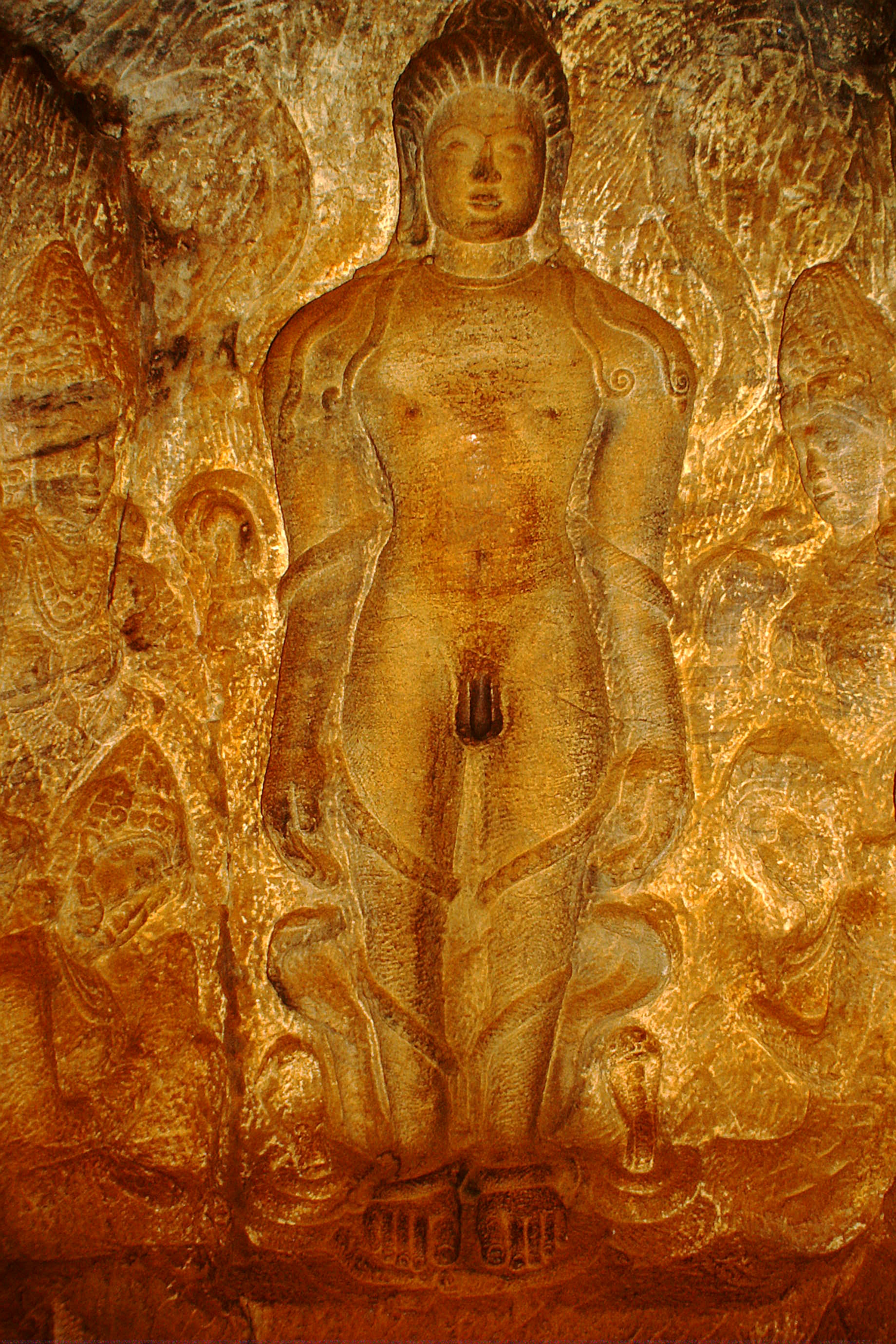
Bahubali at Jain Cave temple No. 4 at Badami, 6th century

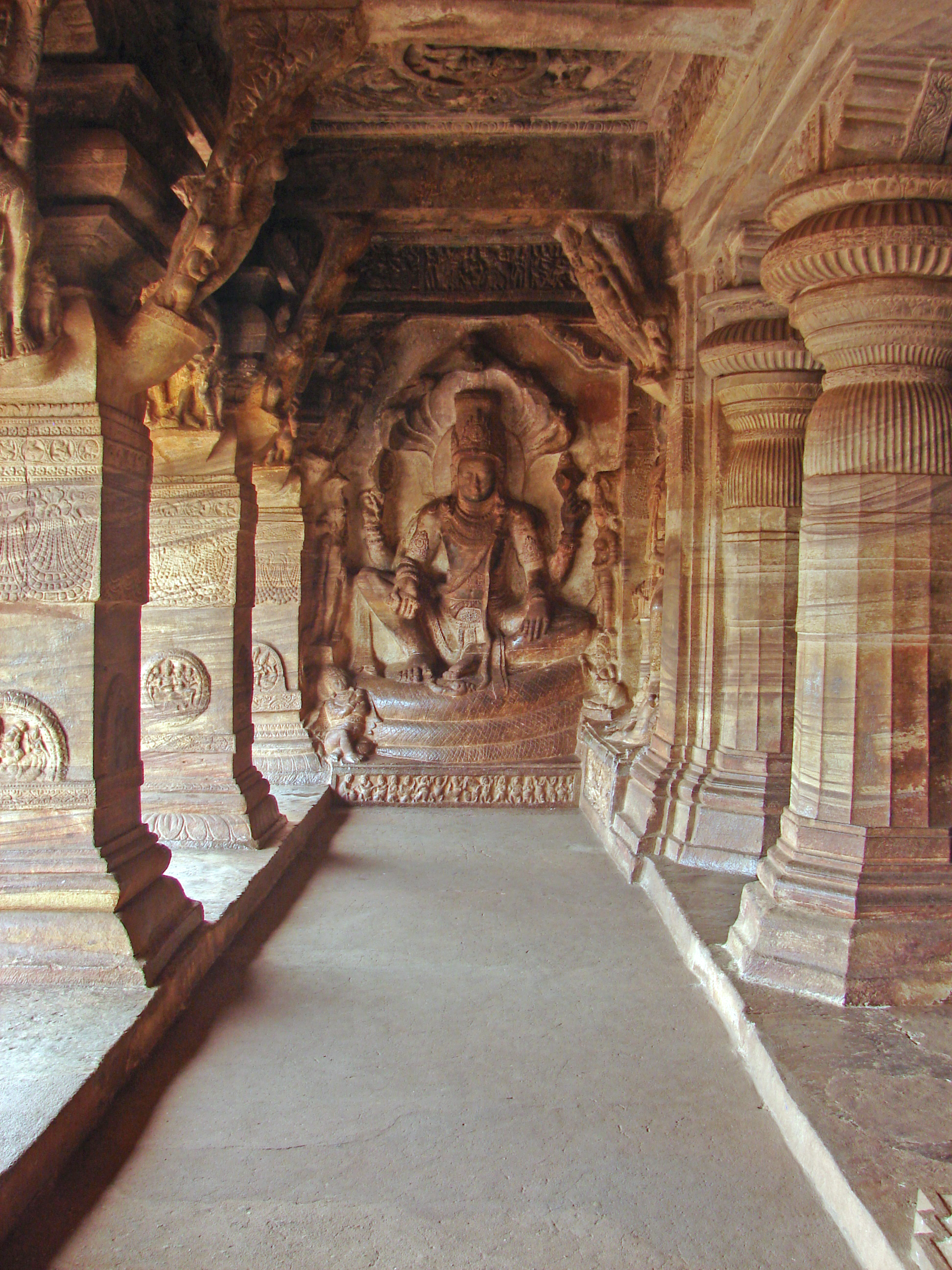
Vishnu image in Cave temple No. 3

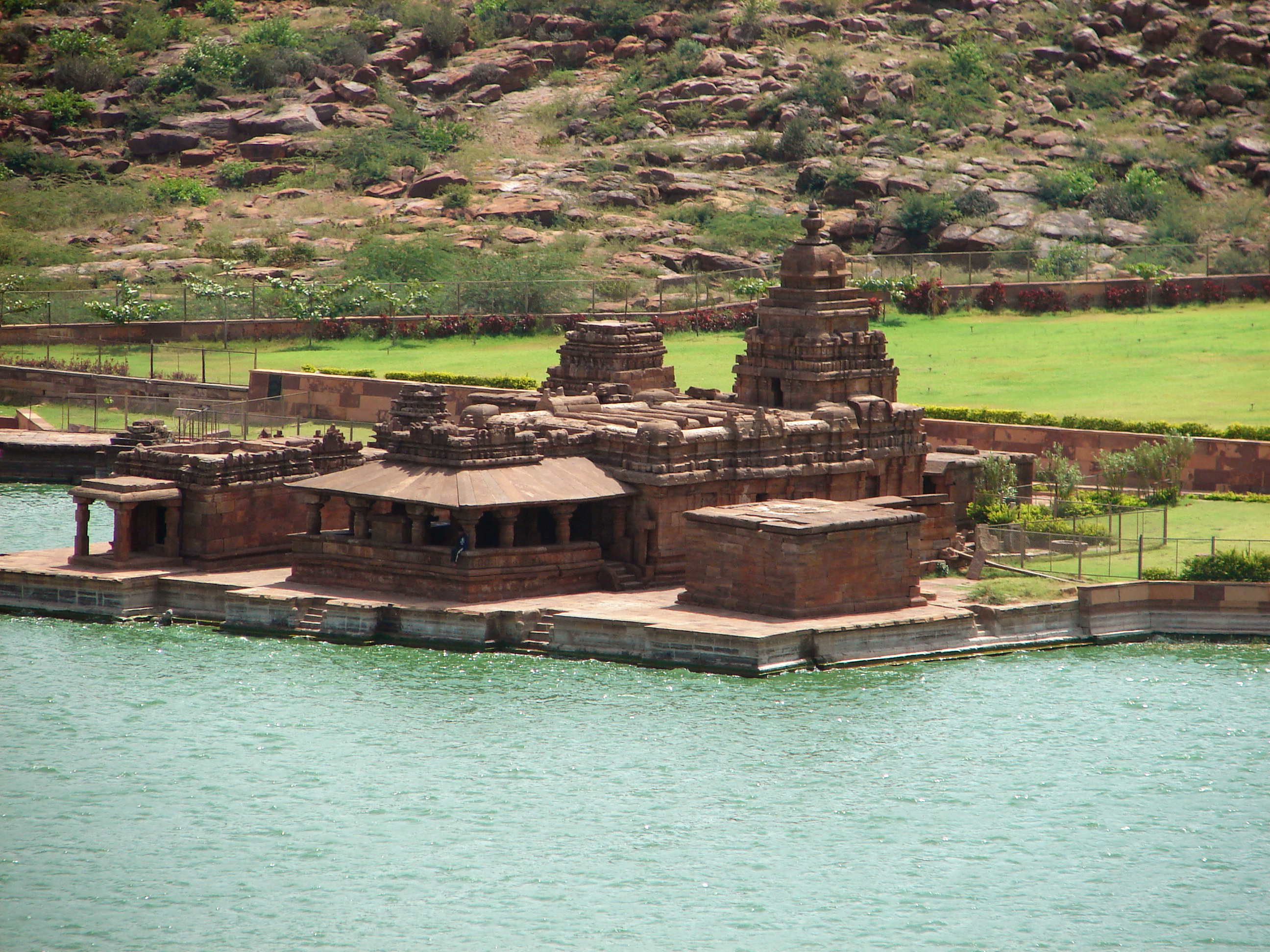
Bhutanatha group of temples facing the Badami tank

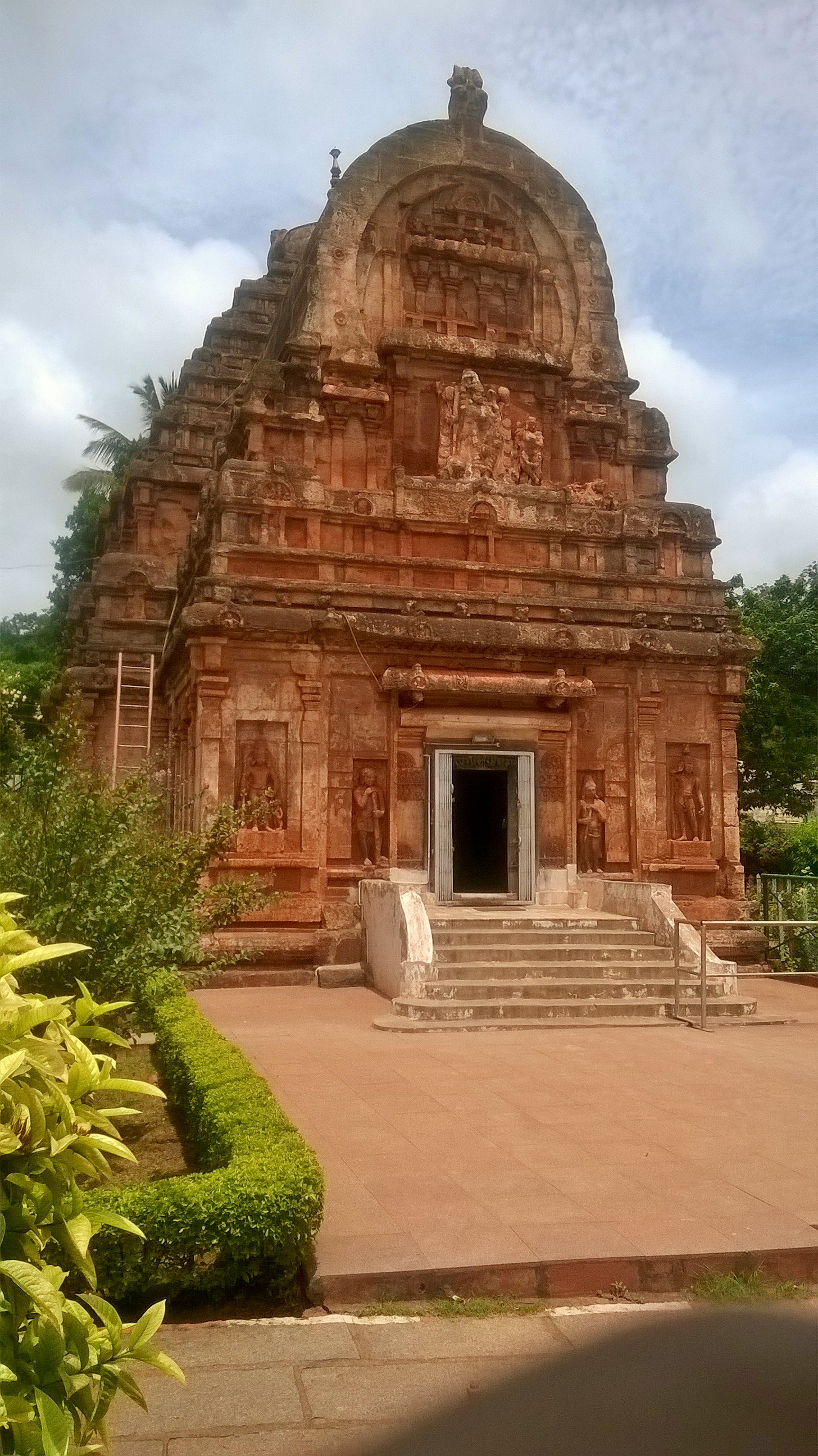
The Parvati Temple, located about 140 km southeast to the Badami

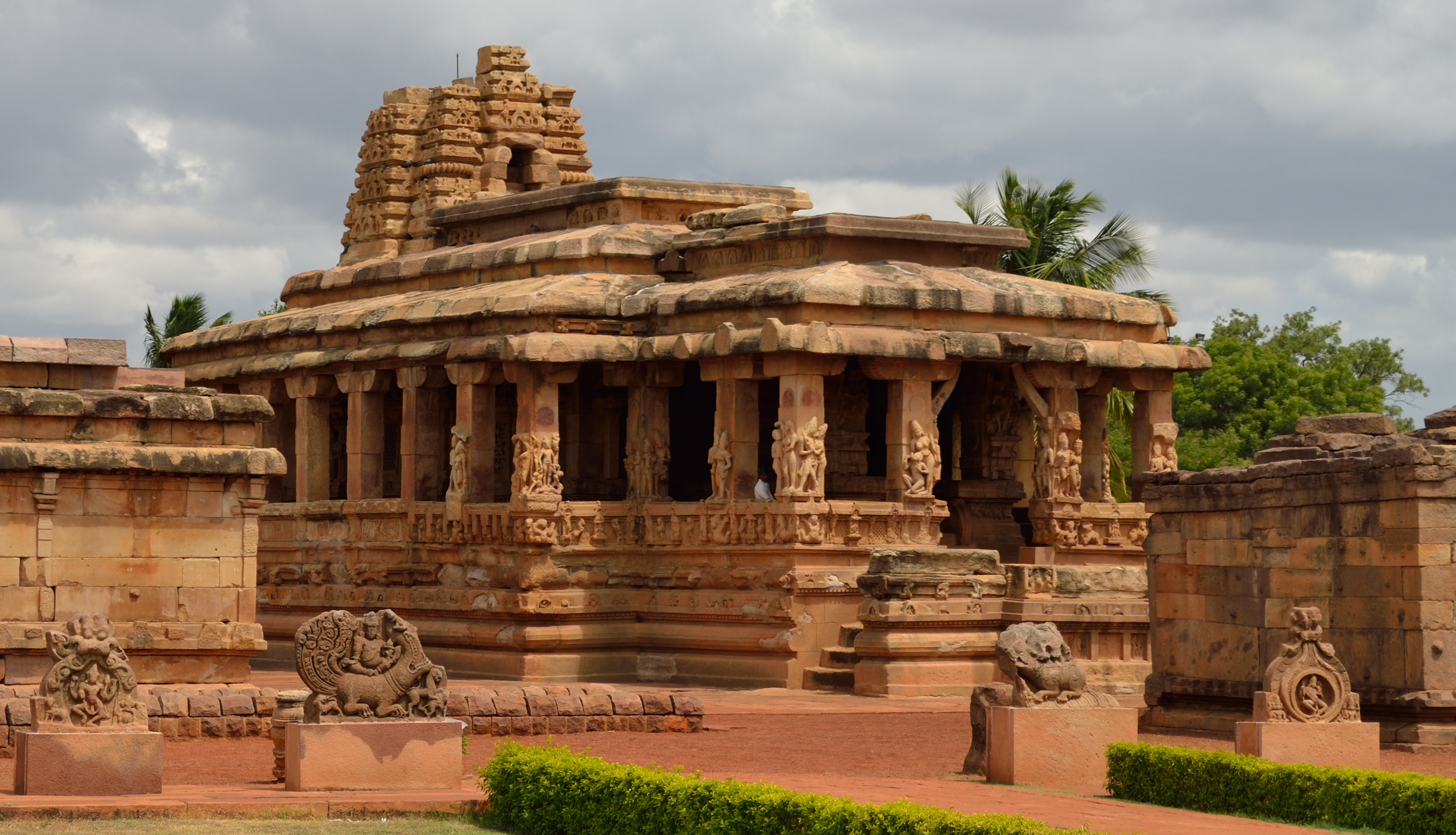
Aihole – Durga Temple Front View

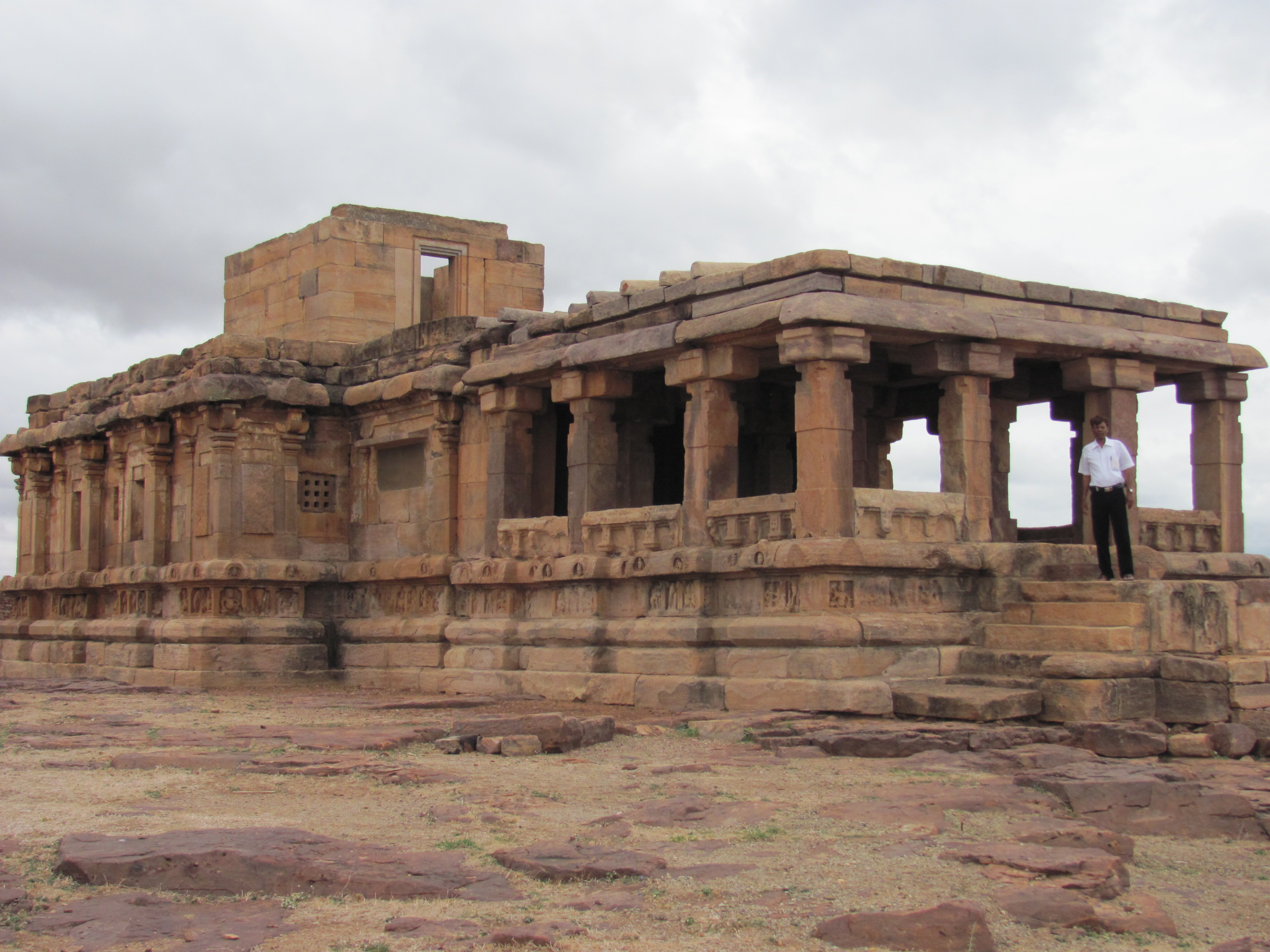
Aihole – Meguti Jain Temple

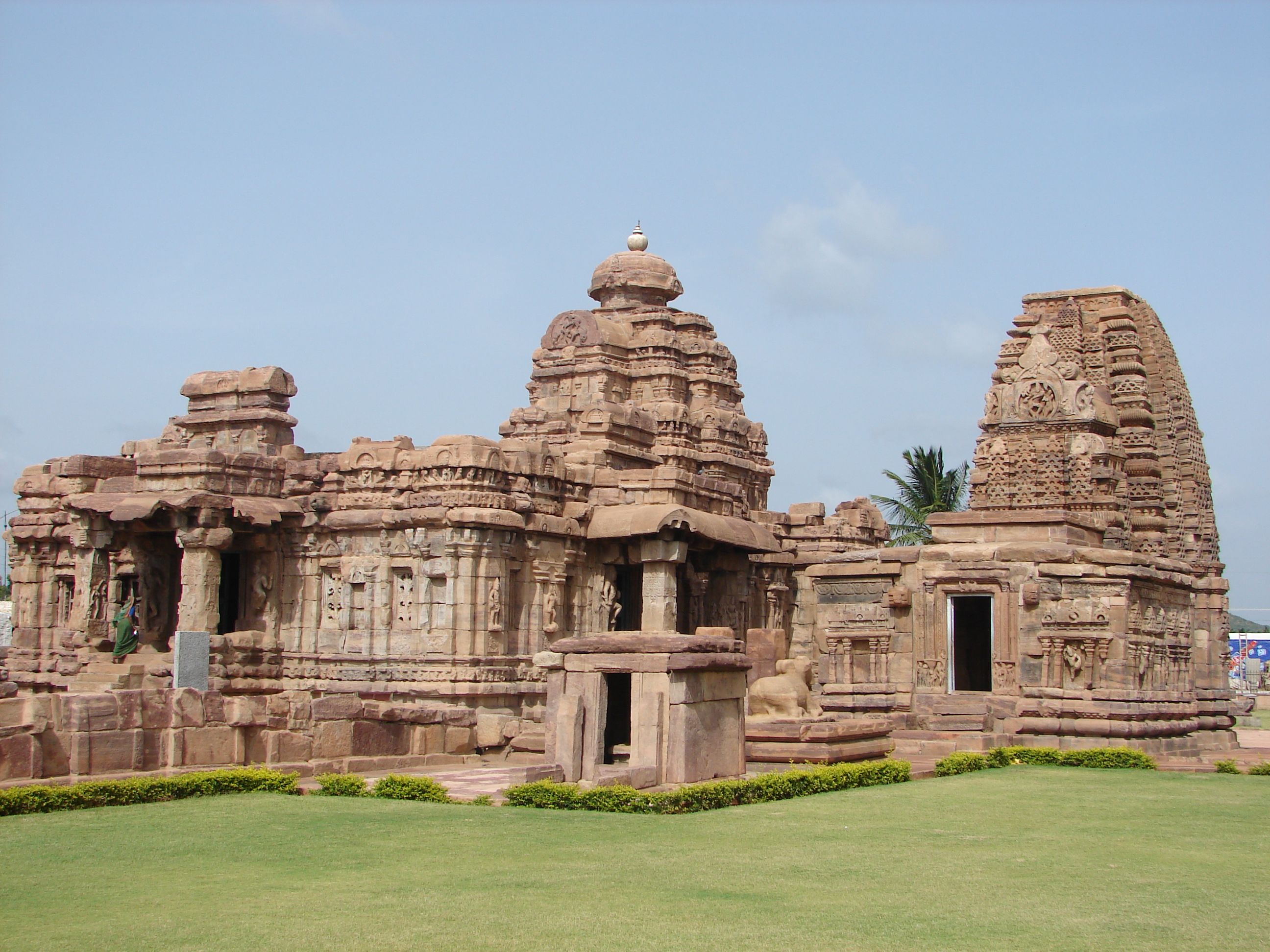
Mallikarjuna temple in dravidian style and Kashi Vishwanatha temple in nagara style at Pattadakal, built 740 CE

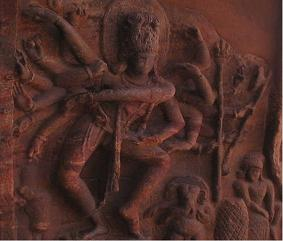
Dancing Shiva in cave no. 1 in Badami

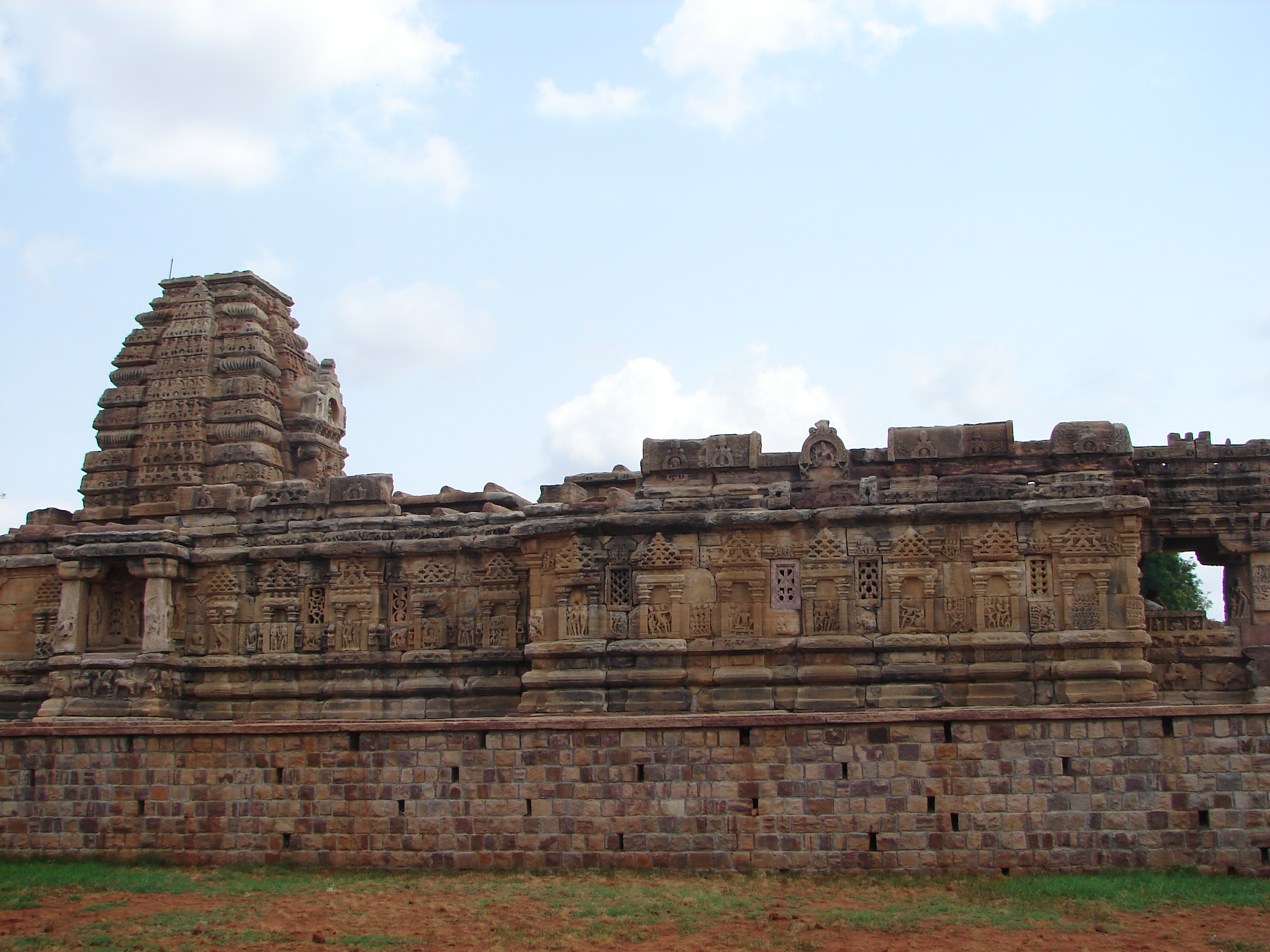
Papanatha temple at Pattadakal – fusion of southern and northern Indian styles, 680 CE

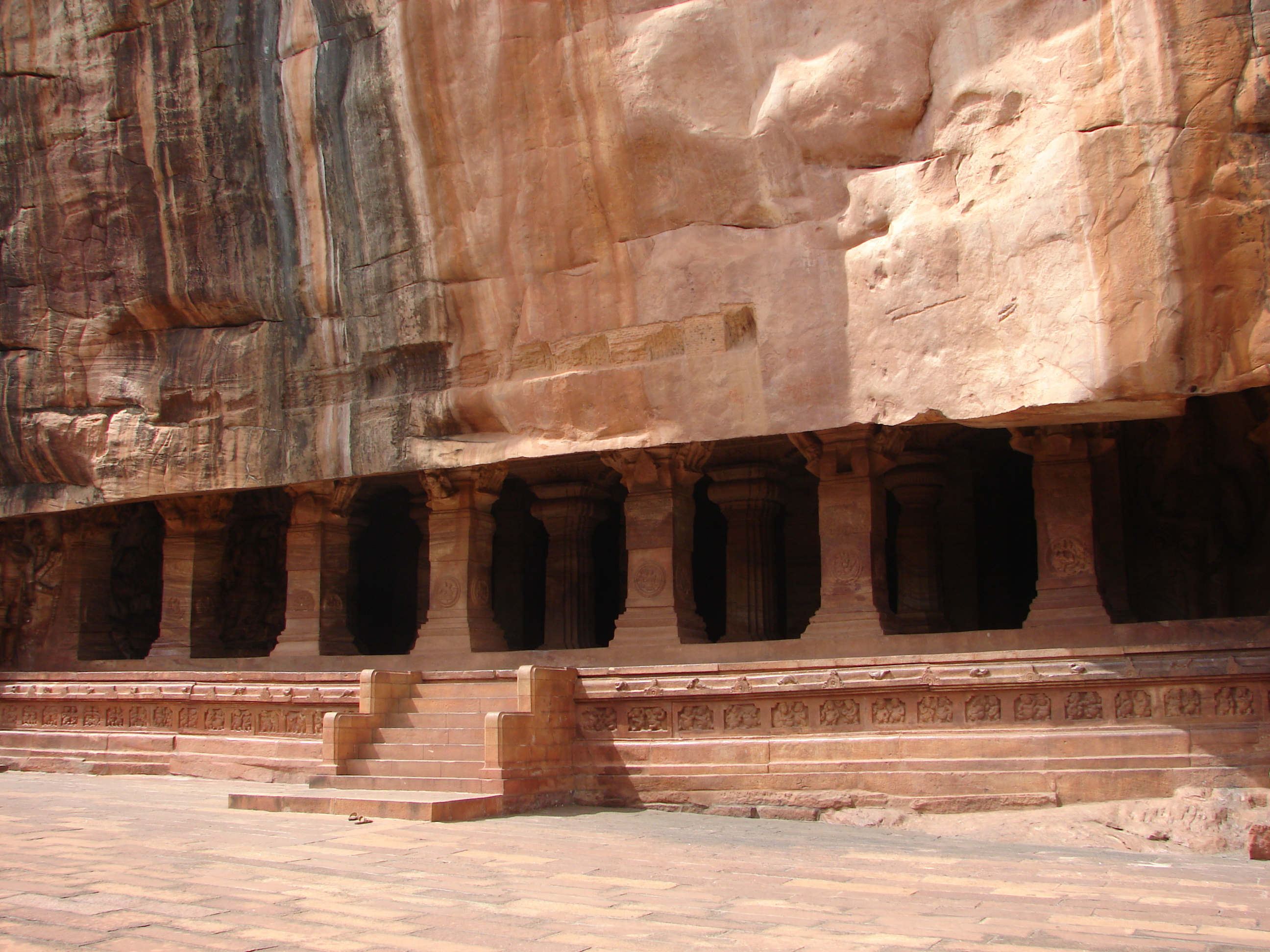
Vaishnava Cave temple No. 3 at Badami, 578 AD

== Literature ==
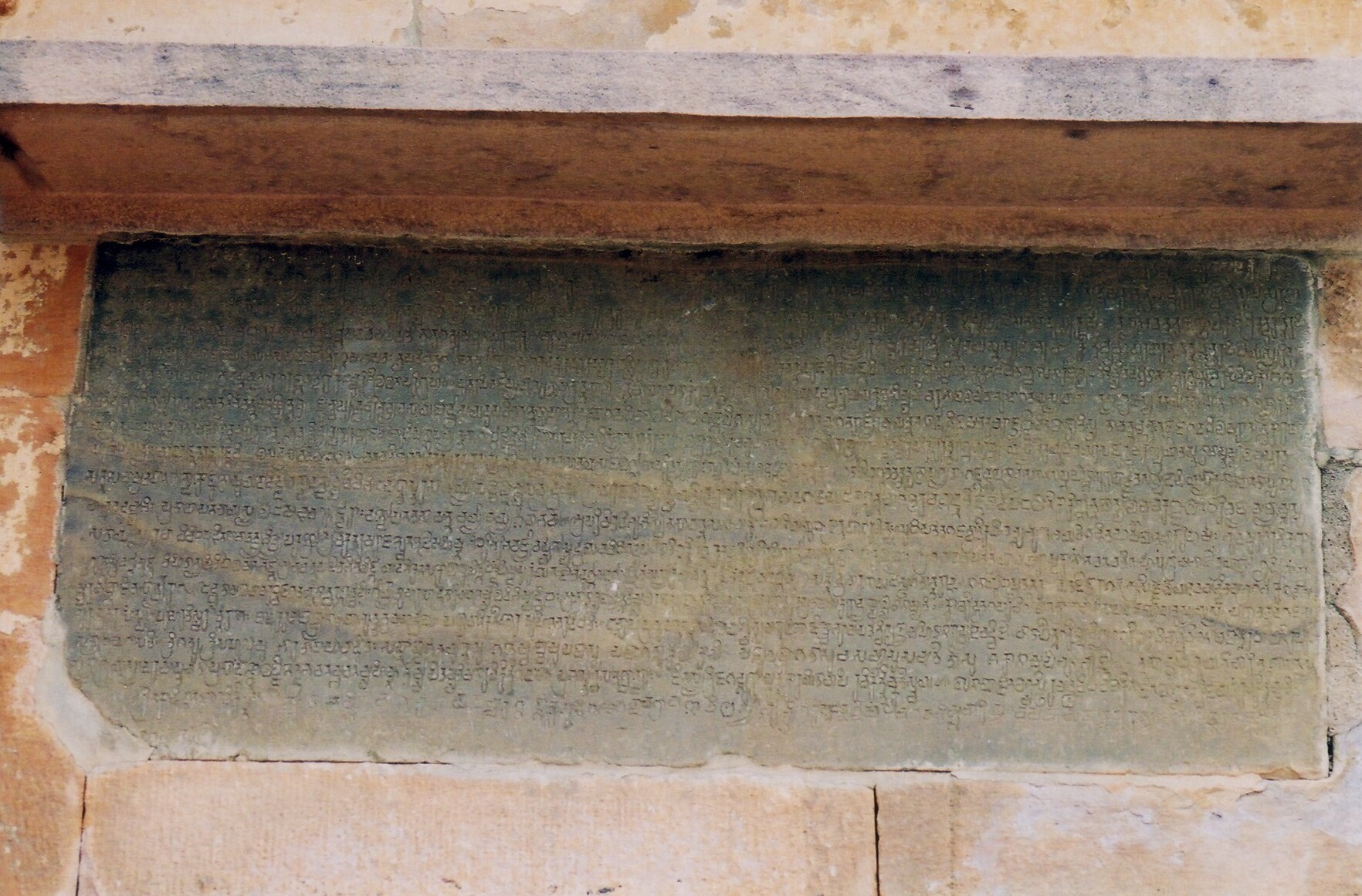
Poetry on stone at the Meguti Jain Basadi (Aihole inscription) dated 634 AD, in Sanskrit language and old Kannada script, with a Kannada language endorsement of about the same date at the bottom.

The Aihole inscription of Pulakeshin II (634) written by his court poet Ravikirti in Sanskrit language and Kannada script is considered as a classical piece of poetry. A few verses of a poet named Vijayanaka who describes herself as the "dark Sarasvati" have been preserved. It is possible that she may have been a queen of prince Chandraditya (a son of Pulakeshin II). Famous writers in Sanskrit from the Western Chalukya period are Vijnaneshwara who achieved fame by writing Mitakshara, a book on Hindu law, and King Someshvara III, a noted scholar, who compiled an encyclopaedia of all arts and sciences called Manasollasa.

From the period of the Badami Chalukyas, references are made to the existence of Kannada literature, though not much has survived. Inscriptions however refer to Kannada as the "natural language". The Kappe Arabhatta record of c. 700 in tripadi (three line) metre is the earliest available work in Kannada poetics. Karnateshwara Katha, which was quoted later by Jayakirti, is believed to be a eulogy of Pulakeshin II and to have belonged to this period. Other probable Kannada writers, whose works are not extant now but titles of which are known from independent references are Syamakundacharya (650), who is said to have authored the Prabhrita, and Srivaradhadeva (also called Tumubuluracharya, 650 or earlier), the possible author of the Chudamani ("Crest Jewel"), a lengthy commentary on logic.

The rule of the Western and Eastern Chalukyas, however, is a major event in the history of Kannada and Telugu literatures respectively. By the 9th–10th centuries, Kannada language had already seen some of its most notable writers. The "three gems" of Kannada literature, Adikavi Pampa, Sri Ponna and Ranna belonged to this period. In the 11th century, Telugu literature was born under the patronage of the Eastern Chalukyas with Nannaya Bhatta as its first writer.

== Badami Chalukya country ==
=== Army ===
The army was well organised and this was the reason for Pulakeshin II's success beyond the Vindyas. It consisted of an infantry, a cavalry, an elephant corps and a powerful navy. The Chinese traveller Hiuen-Tsiang wrote that the Chalukyan army had hundreds of elephants which were intoxicated with liquor prior to battle. It was with their navy that they conquered Revatidvipa (Goa), and Puri on east coast of India. Rashtrakuta inscriptions use the term Karnatakabala when referring to the powerful Chalukya armies.

=== Land governance ===
The government, at higher levels, was closely modelled after the Magadhan and Satavahana administrative machinery. The empire was divided into Maharashtrakas (provinces), then into smaller Rashtrakas (Mandala), Vishaya (district), Bhoga (group of 10 villages) which is similar to the Dasagrama unit used by the Kadambas. At the lower levels of administration, the Kadamba style prevailed fully. The Sanjan plates of Vikramaditya I even mentions a land unit called Dasagrama. In addition to imperial provinces, there were autonomous regions ruled by feudatories such as the Alupas, the Gangas, the Banas and the Sendrakas. Local assemblies and guilds looked after local issues. Groups of mahajanas (learned brahmins) looked after agraharas (called ghatika or "place of higher learning") such as at Badami which was served by 2000 mahajans and Aihole which was served by 500 mahajanas. Taxes were levied and were called the herjunka – tax on loads, the kirukula – tax on retail goods in transit, the bilkode – sales tax, the pannaya – betel tax, siddaya – land tax and the vaddaravula – tax levied to support royalty.

=== Coinage ===
The Badami Chalukyas minted coins that were of a different standard compared to the coins of the northern kingdoms. The coins had Nagari and Kannada legends. The coins of Mangalesha had the symbol of a temple on the obverse and a 'sceptre between lamps' or a temple on the reverse. Pulakeshin II's coins had a caparisoned lion facing right on the obverse and a temple on the reverse. The coins weighed 4 grams and were called, in old-Kannada, hun (or honnu) and had fractions such as fana (or fanam) and the quarter fana (the modern day Kannada equivalent being hana – which literally means "money"). A gold coin called gadyana is mentioned in a record at the Vijayeshwara Temple at Pattadakal, which later came to be known as varaha (their royal emblem).

=== Religion ===
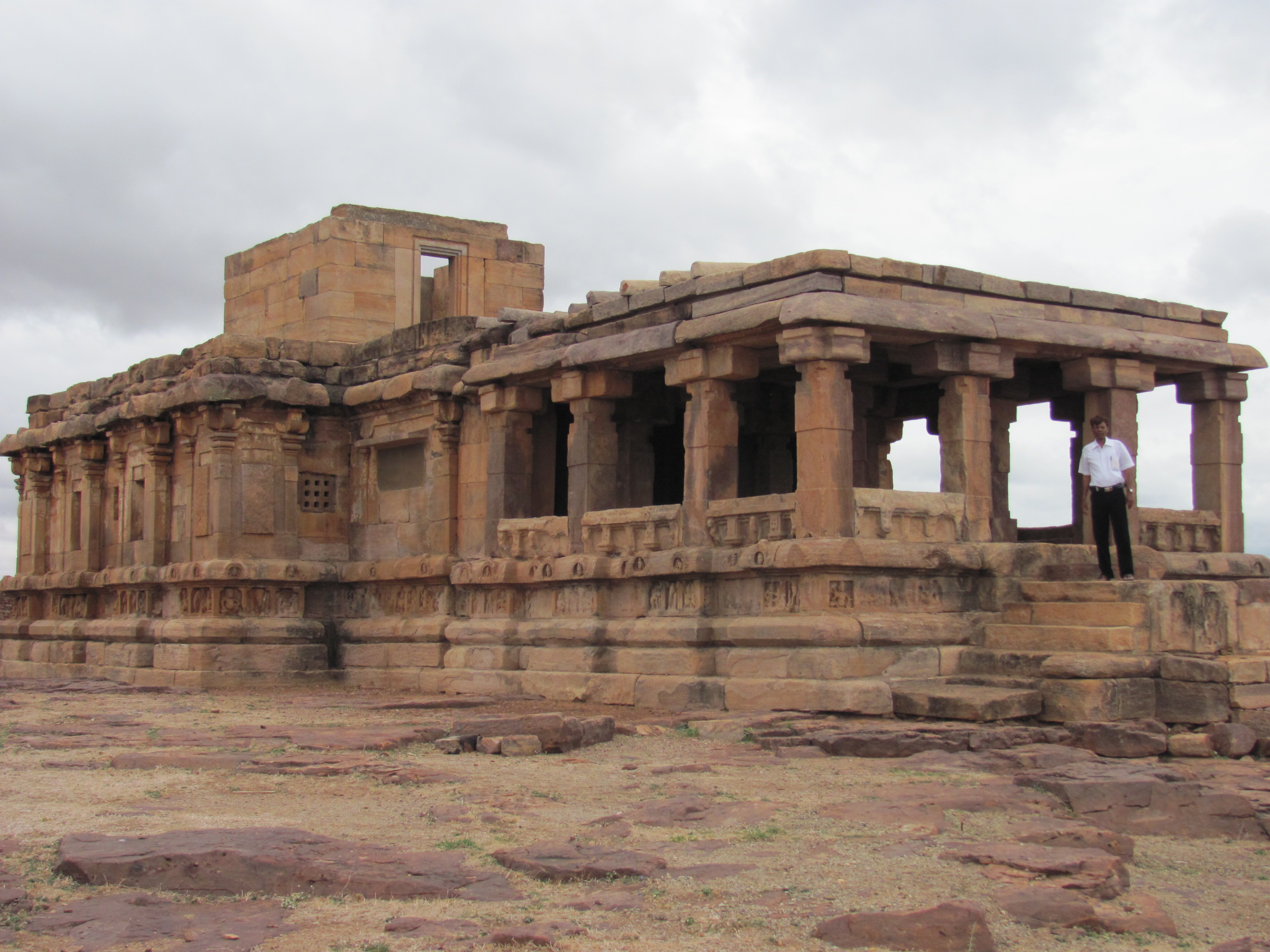
Aihole – Meguti Jain Temple

The Chalukyas supported multiple faiths, but unlike the Rashtrakutas and Gangas whose personal religious affiliations are better known, the personal faith of the Chalukyas remains unclear. Scholars have given different views. some suggest Jainism while others suggest Hinduism. However, many scholars such as Hampa N and S. Settar point out that Jainism was a prominent religion during the early Chalukya period.

Hampa and Settar suggest that Puligere (modern Lakshmeshwara), the first capital of the Chalukyas, was a major Jain centre. Historical records and local tradition mention that there were more than 300 Basadis or likely more around Puligere region. The present Someshwara temple is believed, based on inscriptions and historical evidence, to have originally been a Jain temple built during the reign of Pulakeshin, along with the Shanka Basadi constructed by Pulakeshin II and his family. An inscription fixed on the left wall of the Shanka Basadi at Basti-Bana at Lakshmeshwara, records a grant of 500 nivartanas of land to the north of Puligere-nagara for the worship of "Shankha-Jinendra (Bhagwan Neminatha)". It was made by Durgasakti, son of Kundasakti and grandson of Vijayasakti of the Sendra lineage. The same inscription mentions that Pulakeshin II was also known as "Ereyamma". The Shanka Basadi was one of the most famous Jain shrines during the Chalukya period.

Hampa Nagarajaiah and Settar also noted that the Meguti Jain Basadi inscription, commissioned during the reign of Pulakeshin II, begins with the line “Jayati Bhagwan Jinendra” and mentions Pulakeshin’s military achievements. The composer of the inscription, Ravikirti, was a Jain monk and likely served as the spiritual teacher of Pulakeshin II. and Kumkumadevi, the younger sister of Vijayaditya (and queen of Alupa King Chitravahana) made several grants and had a Jain basadi called Anesajjebasadi constructed at Puligere, Hampa Nagarajaiah further states that the Chalukyas had martial connections with several Jain dynasties, including the Gangas, Alupas, and Kalachuris.

However, the Chalukyas also known for supporting Hinduism as well and built several temples dedicated to Shaiva and Vaishnava deities. Famous temples were built in places such as Pattadakal, Aihole and Mahakuta The Badami kings also supported Vedic priests to do their rituals and built Hindu temples in Aihole. Sculptures of deities testify to the popularity of Hindu Gods such as Vishnu, Shiva, Kartikeya, Ganapathi, Shakti, Surya and Sapta Matrikas ("seven mothers"). The Badami kings also performed the Ashwamedha. The worship of Lajja Gauri, a fertility goddess is known. The kings of the dynasty were however secular and actively encouraged all prominent religions. They built the caves temples for all faiths.

The dynasty, therefore, extended patronage to all the major religions of India Jainism, Hinduism, and Buddhism. Ravikirti, the Jain monk and poet and spiritual advisor of Pulakeshin II. Queen Vinayavati consecrated a temple for the Trimurti ("Hindu trinity") at Badami. Sculptures of the Trimurti, Harihara (half Vishnu, half Shiva) and Ardhanarishwara (half Shiva, half woman) provide ample evidence of their tolerance.

=== Society ===
The society under the Chalukyas was marked by religious pluralism and cultural diversity. Some kings had concubines (ganikas) who were given much respect, Inscriptions record donations to Jain basadis (temples), and prominent Jain scholars such as Ravikirti, the court poet of Pulakeshin II, flourished under their reign. Devadasis were however present in temples. Sage Bharata's Natyashastra, the precursor to Bharatanatyam, the classical dance of South India was popular and is seen in many sculptures and is mentioned in inscriptions. Kumkumadevi the younger sister of Vijayaditya (and queen of Alupa King Chitravahana) made several grants and had a Jain basadi called Anesajjebasadi constructed at Puligere, Sati was perhaps absent since widows like Vinayavathi and Vijayanka are mentioned in records. Some women from the royal family enjoyed political power in administration. Queen Vijayanka was a noted Sanskrit poet, and the queens of Vikramaditya II, Lokamahadevi and Trailokyamahadevi made grants and possibly consecrated the Lokesvara Temple (now called Virupaksha temple) but also and the Mallikarjuna temple respectively at Pattadakal.

== In popular culture ==
The Chalukya era may be seen as the beginning of the fusion of cultures of northern and southern India, making way for the transmission of ideas between the two regions. This is seen clearly in the field of architecture. The Chalukyas spawned the Vesara style of architecture which includes elements of the northern nagara and southern dravida styles. During this period, the expanding Sanskritic culture mingled with local Dravidian vernaculars which were already popular. Dravidian languages maintain these influences even today. This influence helped to enrich literature in these languages. The Hindu legal system owes much to the Sanskrit work Mitakshara by Vijnaneshwara in the court of Western Chalukya King Vikramaditya VI. Perhaps the greatest work in legal literature, Mitakshara is a commentary on Yajnavalkya and is a treatise on law based on earlier writings and has found acceptance in most parts of India. Englishman Henry Thomas Colebrooke later translated into English the section on inheritance, giving it currency in the British Indian court system. It was during the Western Chalukya rule that the Bhakti movement gained momentum in South India, in the form of Ramanujacharya and Basavanna, later spreading into northern India.

A celebration called Chalukya utsava, a three-day festival of music and dance, organised by the Government of Karnataka, is held every year at Pattadakal, Badami and Aihole. The event is a celebration of the achievements of the Chalukyas in the realm of art, craft, music and dance. The program, which starts at Pattadakal and ends in Aihole, is inaugurated by the Chief Minister of Karnataka. Singers, dancers, poets and other artists from all over the country take part in this event. In the 26 February 2006 celebration, 400 art troupes took part in the festivities. Colorful cutouts of the Varaha the Chalukya emblem, Satyashraya Pulakeshin (Pulakeshin II), famous sculptural masterpieces such as Durga, Mahishasuramardhini (Durga killing demon Mahishasura) were present everywhere. The program at Pattadakal is named Anivaritacharigund vedike after the famous architect of the Virupaksha temple, Gundan Anivaritachari. At Badami it is called Chalukya Vijayambika Vedike and at Aihole, Ravikirti Vedike after the famous poet and Jain monk (Ravikirti) in the court of Pulakeshin II. Immadi Pulikeshi, a Kannada movie of the 1960s starring Dr. Rajkumar celebrates the life and times of the great king.

== See also ==
- Eastern Chalukyas
- Western Chalukyas
- Chalukya Cholas
- Hoysala Empire
- Chola dynasty
- Kamboi
- Kamboja

Timeline and cultural period	Indus plain (Punjab-Sapta Sindhu-Gujarat)	Gangetic Plain			Central India	Southern India
Timeline and cultural period	Indus plain (Punjab-Sapta Sindhu-Gujarat)	Upper Gangetic Plain (Ganga-Yamuna doab)	Middle Gangetic Plain	Lower Gangetic Plain	Central India	Southern India
IRON AGE
Culture	Late Vedic Period	Late Vedic Period; Painted Grey Ware culture	Late Vedic Period; Northern Black Polished Ware		Pre-history	
6th century BCE	Gandhara	Kuru-Panchala	Magadha		Adivasi (tribes)	Assaka
Culture	Persian-Greek influences	"Second Urbanisation"; Rise of Shramana movements Jainism - Buddhism - Ājīvika - Yoga			Pre-history	
5th century BCE	(Persian conquests)		Shaishunaga dynasty		Adivasi (tribes)	Assaka
4th century BCE	(Greek conquests)	Nanda empire				
HISTORICAL AGE
Culture	Spread of Buddhism				Pre-history	
3rd century BCE	Maurya Empire					Satavahana dynasty Sangam period (300 BCE – 200 CE); Early Cholas; Early Pandyan kingdom Cheras
Culture	Preclassical Hinduism (Note: Michaels (2004) p.39) - "Hindu Synthesis" (Note: Hiltebeitel (2002)) (ca. 200 BCE - 300 CE) (Note: Michaels (2004) p.39) (Note: Hiltebeitel (2002)); Epics - Puranas - Ramayana - Mahabharata - Bhagavad Gita - Brahma Sutras - Smarta Tradition; Mahayana Buddhism					
2nd century BCE	Indo-Greek Kingdom		Shunga Empire; Maha-Meghavahana Dynasty			Satavahana dynasty Sangam period (300 BCE – 200 CE); Early Cholas; Early Pandyan kingdom Cheras
1st century BCE	Indo-Greek Kingdom		Shunga Empire; Maha-Meghavahana Dynasty			Satavahana dynasty Sangam period (300 BCE – 200 CE); Early Cholas; Early Pandyan kingdom Cheras
1st century CE	Indo-Scythians; Indo-Parthians		Kuninda Kingdom			Satavahana dynasty Sangam period (300 BCE – 200 CE); Early Cholas; Early Pandyan kingdom Cheras
2nd century	Kushan Empire					Satavahana dynasty Sangam period (300 BCE – 200 CE); Early Cholas; Early Pandyan kingdom Cheras
3rd century	Kushano-Sasanian Kingdom; Western Satraps	Kushan Empire		Kamarupa kingdom	Adivasi (tribes)	Satavahana dynasty Sangam period (300 BCE – 200 CE); Early Cholas; Early Pandyan kingdom Cheras
Culture	"Golden Age of Hinduism"(ca. CE 320-650) (Note: Michaels (2004) p.40); Puranas - Kural; Co-existence of Hinduism and Buddhism					
4th century	Kidarites	Gupta Empire; Varman dynasty				Andhra Ikshvakus; Kalabhra dynasty Kadamba Dynasty; Western Ganga Dynasty
5th century	Hephthalite Empire	Alchon Huns				Vishnukundina; Kalabhra dynasty
6th century	Nezak Huns; Kabul Shahi; Maitraka				Adivasi (tribes)	Vishnukundina; Badami Chalukyas; Kalabhra dynasty
Culture	Late-Classical Hinduism (ca. CE 650-1100) (Note: Michaels (2004) p.41); Advaita Vedanta - Tantra; Decline of Buddhism in India					
7th century	Indo-Sassanids		Vakataka dynasty Empire of Harsha	Mlechchha dynasty	Adivasi (tribes)	Badami Chalukyas; Eastern Chalukyas; Pandyan kingdom (revival); Pallava
7th century	Karkota dynasty				Adivasi (tribes)	
8th century	Kabul Shahi	Pala Empire			Adivasi (tribes)	Eastern Chalukyas; Pandyan kingdom Kalachuri
9th century	Gurjara-Pratihara				Adivasi (tribes)	Rashtrakuta Empire; Eastern Chalukyas; Pandyan kingdom Medieval Cholas; Chera Perumals of Makkotai
10th century	Ghaznavids			Pala dynasty Kamboja-Pala dynasty	Adivasi (tribes)	Kalyani Chalukyas; Eastern Chalukyas; Medieval Cholas; Chera Perumals of Makkotai; Rashtrakuta
References and sources for table References Sources: Flood, Gavin D. (1996), An Introduction to Hinduism, Cambridge University Press; Hiltebeitel, Alf (2002), Hinduism. In: Joseph Kitagawa, "The Religious Traditions of Asia: Religion, History, and Culture", Routledge; Michaels, Axel (2004), Hinduism. Past and present, Princeton, New Jersey: Princeton University Press
