= Jayasimha =

Jayasimha may refer to:

== People ==
- Jayasimha (Vatapi Chalukya dynasty), reigned in early 6th century
- Jayasimha I (Eastern Chalukya dynasty), reigned c. 641–673
- Jayasimha II (Eastern Chalukya dynasty), reigned 706–718 in the Eastern Chalukyas
- Jayasimha II (Western Chalukya dynasty) (1015–1042), reigned 1015–1043
- Jayasimha I (Paramara dynasty), reigned c. 1055–1070
- Jayasimha II (Paramara dynasty), reigned c. 1255–1274; alias Jayavarman II
- Jayasimha Siddharaja (Chaulukya dynasty), reigned c. 1092–1142
- Jayasimha (Kalachuri dynasty), reigned c. 1163-1188
- Jayasimha (Chudasama dynasty), early ruler
- Jayasimha I (Chudasama dynasty), reigned 1351-1378
- Jayasimha II (Chudasama dynasty), reigned 1415-1430

== Other ==
- Jayasimha (1955 film), an Indian Telugu film
- Jayasimha (1987 film), an Indian Kannada film

== See also ==
- Jai Simha, a 2018 Indian Telugu-language action drama film
- Jai Singh (disambiguation), another transliteration of the name
- Jaya (disambiguation)
