= Jai Singh =

Jai Singh may refer to:

- Jai Singh I (1611–1667), ruler of Amber kingdom in India and a Rajput general of the Mughal Empire, he was also known as Mirza Raja Jai Singh
- Jai Singh of Mewar (1653–1698), ruler of the Mewar kingdom in India
- Jai Singh II (1688–1743), ruler of Amber kingdom in India; also known as Maharaja Sawai Jai Singh
- Jai Singh III (1819–1835), Maharaja of Jaipur State
- Jai Singh Kanheya (1712–1793), the founder and leader of the Kanheya Misl of India
- Jai Singh Prabhakar (1882–1937), Maharaja of Alwar kingdom in India
- Jai Arjun Singh, New Delhi–based freelance writer and journalist
- Jai Pal Singh (1930–1997), Indian physician and educator
- Jai Pratap Singh (born 1953), Indian politician in the Uttar Pradesh Legislative Assembly
- Jai Pal Singh (politician), Indian politician in the Uttar Pradesh Legislative Council
- Jai Vardhan Singh, fictional character portrayed by Saif Ali Khan in the 2009 Indian film Love Aaj Kal
- Jai Singh Rathod, fictional character portrayed by Rana Daggubati in the 2015 Indian film Baby

== See also ==
- Jayasimha (disambiguation), another transliteration of the name
- Jayasinghe, a Sinhalese name
- Jaivardhan Singh, Indian politician
- J. Jayasingh Thiyagaraj Natterjee, Indian lawyer and politician
- Jaisingrao Gaikwad Patil, Indian politician
- Jaysinhji Chauhan, Indian politician
