= Jayasinghe =

Family name

- Pronunciation: /ˈdʒəjəsɪŋhə/
- Gender: Unisex
- Language: Sinhalese

Origin
- Meaning: Victorious Lion
- Region of origin: Sri Lanka

Other names
- Alternative spelling: Jayasingha

Jayasinghe is a Sinhalese surname that consists of two parts: jaya, which means victory in Sinhalese and is also the name of a Hindu demigod, and singhe (lion). The name may refer to the following notable people:

- Chandrani Bandara Jayasinghe (born 1962), member of the Parliament of Sri Lanka
- Chinthaka Jayasinghe (born 1978), Sri Lankan cricketer
- Dilan Jayasingha (born 1987), Sri Lankan American hip-hop artist
- G. R. Jayasinghe, Brigadier in the Sri Lanka Army
- Izzy Jayasinghe, biophysicist
- Lalith Jayasinghe (1974 - 2008), lieutenant colonel in the Sri Lanka Army
- N. D. N. P. Jayasinghe, former member of the Parliament of Sri Lanka
- Rohan Jayasinghe (born 1956), brigadier in the Sri Lanka Army
- Savitri Jayasinghe (died 2024), banking executive from Sri Lanka
- Stanley Jayasinghe (born 1931), former Sri Lankan cricketer
- Sunil Jayasinghe (born 1955), former Sri Lankan cricketer
- Susanthika Jayasinghe (born 1975), Sri Lankan athlete
