= Ranaraga =

Chalukya king from c. 520 to 540

Chalukya king
- Reign: c. 520 – c. 540
- Predecessor: Jayasimha
- Successor: Pulakeshin I
- Dynasty: Chalukyas of Vatapi
- Father: Jayasimha

Ranaraga (IAST: Raṇarāga) was an early 6th century ruler of the Chalukya dynasty of Vatapi (modern Badami) in present-day India. A vassal ruler, he was the father of the dynasty's first sovereign ruler, Pulakeshin I.

== Reign ==
A 543 CE (Shaka 465) inscription dated to the reign of Ranaraga's son Pulakeshin I has been discovered at Badami. Assuming a reign of around 20 years for Ranaraga, historian Durga Prasad Dikshit dates Jayasimha's reign to c. 520-540 CE.

Ranaraga succeeded his father Jayasimha, who was also a vassal ruler, possibly that of the Kadambas or the early Rashtrakutas of Manapura (not to be confused with the later imperial Rashtrakutas of Manyakheta). Jayasimha seems to have carved out a principality around modern Bijapur after the decline of his overlords, and Ranaraga appears to have spent his reign stabilizing the Chalukya power in the area.

Like his father, Ranaraga finds a mention in the Aihole and Mahakuta inscriptions of the Vatapi Chalukyas. The Mahakuta inscription states that "his fondness for war elicited the affection of his own people and caused vexation of mind to his enemies." The dynasty's inscriptions do not credit Ranaraga with any military achievements. According to the Yevor inscription of the later Kalyani Chalukyas, who claimed descent from the Vatapi Chalukyas, Ranaraga was a brave ruler, and bore a "stately and gigantic personality". The Kalyani Chalukya court poet Ranna calls him Raṇarāga-siṃha.
