= Jaya =

Jaya may refer to:

== Media ==
- Jaya, self titled albums by Jaya (singer), released in 1989, 1996 and 2001
- Jaya (film), a 2002 Indian Tamil film

== Hindu mythology ==
- Jaya, a Sanskrit term meaning victorious
- Jaya Samhita, an earlier name of the epic Mahabharata, considered to form its core portion
- Jaya, a name of Karna in the Mahabharata
- Jaya-Vijaya, the door-keepers of Vaikuntha, the realm of the god Vishnu in Hindu mythology
- Jaya, son from consort Padma of Kalki

== People ==
- Jaya (given name), list of people with this name, or names derived from it
- Jaya (singer) (born 1970), Filipina soul singer

== Places ==
=== Fictional places ===
- Jaya, an island in Oda Eiichiro's manga and anime series One Piece

=== Indonesia ===
- Aceh Jaya Regency, Aceh
- Bintaro Jaya, a real-estate in the outskirts of Jakarta
- Jakarta, comes from the name: Jayakarta which means "victorious city".
- Jayapura, a capital and largest city of the Indonesian province of Papua
- Jayawijaya Regency, Highland Papua
- Pidie Jaya Regency, Aceh
- Puncak Jaya, the country's highest mountain
- Puncak Jaya Regency, Central Papua

=== Malaysia ===
- Petaling Jaya
- Putrajaya
- Seberang Jaya
- Subang Jaya

== Science ==
- Aspidoparia jaya, a fish native to India and Bangladesh
- Jaya (insect), a genus of antlions

== See also ==
- Jay (disambiguation)
- Jai (disambiguation)
- Jayam (disambiguation)
- Satyameva Jayate (disambiguation)
- Greater Jakarta Metropolitan Regional Police (Polda Metro Jaya), the police force of Jakarta
- Irian Jaya
- Jaya Group, Indonesian company founded by Ciputra
- Jaya TV, a Tamil-language satellite television channel in India
