= Jayam =

Jayam may refer to the following in Indian cinema:

- Jayam (1999 film), a Tamil film by Ravi Raja
- Jayam (2002 film), a Telugu film by Teja
- Jayam (2003 film), a Tamil film by M. Raja
- Jayam (2006 film), a 2006 Malayalam film by Sonu Sisupal
- Jayam Ravi (born 1980), Indian actor

== See also ==
- Jaya (disambiguation)
