= Jayasimha (Vatapi Chalukya dynasty) =

Chalukya king from c. 500 to 520

- Nṛpaḥ

Chalukya king
- Reign: c. 500 – c. 520
- Successor: Ranaraga
- Dynasty: Chalukyas of Vatapi

Jayasimha (IAST: Jayasiṃha) was the first ruler of the Chalukya dynasty of Vatapi (modern Badami) in present-day India. He ruled the area around modern Bijapur in the early 6th century, and was the grandfather of the dynasty's first sovereign ruler, Pulakeshin I.

== Reign ==
Jayasimha finds a mention in the Aihole and Mahakuta inscriptions of his dynasty, but no inscription issued by him has been discovered so far. A 543 CE (Shaka 465) inscription dated to the reign of his grandson Pulakeshin I has been discovered at Badami. Assuming a reign of around 20 years each for Jayasimha and his son Ranaraga, historian Durga Prasad Dikshit dates Jayasimha's reign to c. 500-520 CE. He was succeeded by his son Ranaraga, who appears to have stabilized the Chalukya rule in the region.

The Mahakuta inscription eulogizes Jayasimha as "the very receptacle of brilliance, energy, valour, memory, intellect, splendour, polity and refinement." It compares him to the deity Maghavan (Indra) in terms of good qualities, and to the deity Vaishravana (Kubera) in terms of wealth.

== Political status ==
The Mahakuta inscription gives Jayasimha's title as nṛpaḥ ("king"). The Chalukya records also accord him various epithets, such as Vallabha, Shri-vallabha, and Vallabhendra. The absence of any imperial titles in this list indicates that Jayasimha was a vassal king.

According to one theory, Jayasimha was a vassal of the Kadambas. The Chalukya inscriptions and coins are somewhat similar in style to those of the Kadambas, who preceded them in the Deccan region. According to the Daulatabad inscription of Jagadekamalla, Jayasimha was "the destroyer of the pomp of the Kadambas". This suggests that Jayasimha was originally a Kadamba vassal, but this cannot be said with certainty. For example, it is possible that Jayasimha was actually a vassal of the early Rashtrakutas of Manapura, and repulsed a Kadamba attack a Rashtrakuta feudatory. Another possibility is that Jayasimha assumed sovereignty after the defeat of his Rashtrakuta overlords by the Nalas and the Mauryas of Konkana, and then repulsed a Kadamba invasion.

Another theory is that Jayasimha was a vassal of the early Rashtrakutas of Manapura (not to be confused with the later imperial Rashtrakutas of Manyakheta). According to the records of the later Chalukyas of Kalyani, who claimed descent from the Chalukyas of Vatapi, the Chalukya family's progenitor Jayasimha defeated the Rashtrakutas (like the 10th century Kalyani Chalukya ruler Tailapa II, who defeated the Rashtrakutas of Manyakheta). These records include the Kauthem inscription and the court poet Ranna's Gadayuddha. The Kauthem inscription names the defeated king as Indra, the son of Krishna; no such early Rashtrakuta king is known from the extant historical records. An inscription of the early Rashtrakuta king Abhimanyu records the grant of the Undikavatika village to the Shaivite ascetic Jatabhara in the presence of Jayasimha, the commander of the Harivatsa fort. This commander may be same as the Chalukya ruler Jayasimha. Historian D. C. Sircar theorized that the Rashtrakutas of Manapura were overthrown by the Nalas and the Konkana Mauryas, who, in turn, were overthrown by the Chalukyas.

The Gadayuddha and the Kauthem inscription both claim that the Chalukya family ruled in Ayodhya for several generations before establishing its authority in the south, a claim also found in the eastern Chalukya inscriptions. Based on this legend, some modern historians believe that Jayasimha's ancestors may have been migrants from northern India. Others point out that these legends did not exist before the 11th century, and therefore, are not historically reliable.
