= Amminabhavi =

- village
- Country: India
- State: Karnataka
- District: Dharwad
- Talukas: Dharwad

Government
  - Type: Panchayat raj
  - Body: Gram panchayat

Population (2011)
  - Total: 12,243

Languages
  - Official: Kannada
- Time zone: UTC+5:30 (IST)
- ISO 3166 code: IN-KA
- Vehicle registration: KA
- Website: karnataka.gov.in

Amminabhavi is a village in the southern state of Karnataka, India. It is located in the Dharwad taluk of Dharwad district in Karnataka.

== Demographics ==
As of the 2011 Census of India there were 2,423 households in Amminabhavi and a total population of 12,243 consisting of 6,226 males and 6,017 females. There were 1,550 children ages 0-6.

== Panchapeethas of veerashivisam - panchaguruha samsthaan hiremath ==
In Amminabavi village near Dharwad, Shree Panchagruha Samsthan Hiremath, which is a branch Math of Shreemad Rambhapuri Veerasimhaasana Mahasansthaan Jagadguru Peetha located in Balehonnur of Chikkamagaluru district, which is the first Peetha in the guru tradition of Panchapeeths of Veerashaivism, is located in the heart of the village. The monastery dates back to around 10th century (i.e. pre-Basava era). This mutt building is constructed in a unique design. The name of the elder pontiff of Shree Panchagruha Samsthaan Hiremath is Shatsthala Brahma Shantalinga Shivacharya Mahaswamiji and the name of the younger pontiff of Shree Panchagruha Samsthaan Hiremath is Shatsthala Brahma Abhinava Shantalinga Shivacharya Mahaswamiji.

=== Jain Matha ===
A Jain Matha exists in this village. It is headed by Bhattaraka Swasti Sri Dharmasena.

=== See also ===
- Dharwad
- Districts of Karnataka

=== External links ===
- http://Dharwad.nic.in/
