= Gundan Anivaritachari =

Indian architect

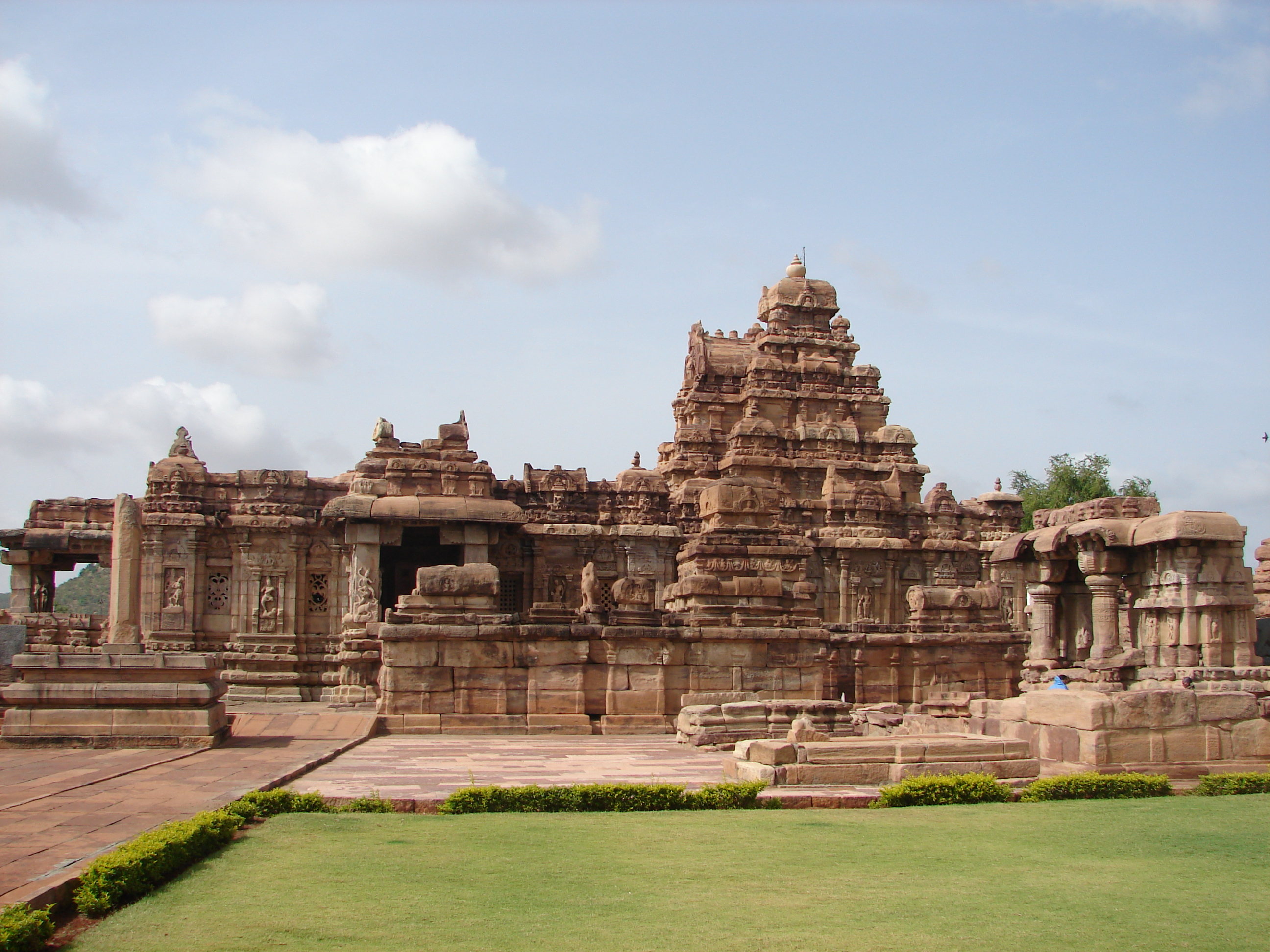
Virupaksha temple at Pattadakal

Sri Gundan Anivaritachari was the chief architect of the Virupaksha temple, the most famous and centerpiece at world heritage temple complex at Pattadakal. According to inscriptions he held such titles as "Anikapuravastu Pitamaha" and "Tenkanadesiya Sutradhari".

The temple was built at the orders of Lokamahadevi, the senior queen of Vikramaditya II to commemorate his victory over the Pallavas. It has many features similar to the Kailasanatha temple of Kanchi.
