= Savitri Jayasinghe =

Banking executive

Savitri Jayasinghe (née Vitarana; died 2024) was a banking executive from Sri Lanka.

== Biography ==
Jayasinghe's parents were Percy and Celia Vitarana. She was educated at Kalutara Balika Vidyalaya and later at Holy Family Convent, Bambalapitiya. She studied economics at the University of Peradeniya in Kandy. She was appointed general manager of the Bank of Ceylon in 1996.

Jayasinghe was an Associate and Fellow of the Chartered Institute of Banking, London.

== Personal life ==
Jayasinghe was married to Edmund Jayasinghe, a government official in the foreign service.
