= Satyamev Jayate (disambiguation) =

Satyamev Jayate or Satyameva Jayate is the national motto of India.

Satyamev(a) Jayate may also refer to:

== Film ==
- Satyamev Jayate (film), a 1987 Indian Hindi-language film directed by Raj N. Sippy
- Sathyameva Jayathe, a 2000 Indian Malayalam-language film directed by Viji Thampi
- Satyameba Jayate, a 2008 Indian action thriller film directed by Milan Bhowmik
- Satyameva Jayate (2009 film), an Indian Telugu-language film directed by Jeevitha
- Satyameva Jayate (2018 film), an Indian Hindi-language action directed film by Milap Zaveri

== Other uses ==
- Satyamev Jayate (talk show), a 2012–2014 Indian talk show hosted by Aamir Khan
- "Satyameva Jayathe" (song), a 2011 song by SuperHeavy
