= Jeevuba =

Devotee from Swaminarayan sect

Jeevuba, otherwise known as Motiba, Poonamatiba (name given since she was born on Poonam), and Jaya, was born in 1785 (Samvat (calendars) year 1841). Her father's name was Abhel Khachar and she had many siblings including a younger sister named Lalita. She was a very staunch devotee of Swaminarayan.

== Biography ==
As legend goes, Jeevuba offered food to the idol of Swaminarayan and he accepted the food. Abhel Khachar wondered who this "Swaminarayan" was and sought after to see if he was actually a God. He threatened Jeevuba, who was praying to this 'God', and said that Swaminarayan must come and accept the food given or else he would kill her with his sword. Jeevuba peacefully served Swaminarayan and a miracle occurred. Swaminarayan actually came and accepted her food. Abhel Khacher was left speechless.

Another time, Abhel Khachar wanted to get his daughter, Jeevuba, married. Jeevuba didn't want to get married and wanted to live life as a worshiper of Swaminarayan. Abhel forced her to marry and thus she married Hathia Patgar. Though, Jeevuba told Hathia that she wanted to only worship Swaminarayan and therefore, with his consent, left him.

== Life in Renunciation ==
Abhel Khachar hadn't noticed, but Jeevuba invited Swaminarayan, who was disguised as a buttermilk saleswoman, in their house for a month. When Abhel Khachar found out, he went to go beat up Swaminarayan. After seeing his glory, he refrained. He had found out that it was Swaminarayan that his daughter had been worshiping the entire time.

Once Jeevuba saw the saint, Akhandanand Swami suffer from diarrhea sitting under a tree. Jeevuba, at once, came, seated him on the chariot that she used to get there, and took the saint to a safe place. Swaminarayan heard of this and was greatly pleased. In return for doing this favor, Swaminarayan gave Jeevuba his darshan (appearance) as Krishna, Rama, and other gods. Finally, Jeevuba died in 1860 (Samvat year 1916 on the bright half of the month of Jeth). She had been a great person in the Swaminarayan Sanstha (organization).
