= Izzy Jayasinghe =

Researcher in New Zealand

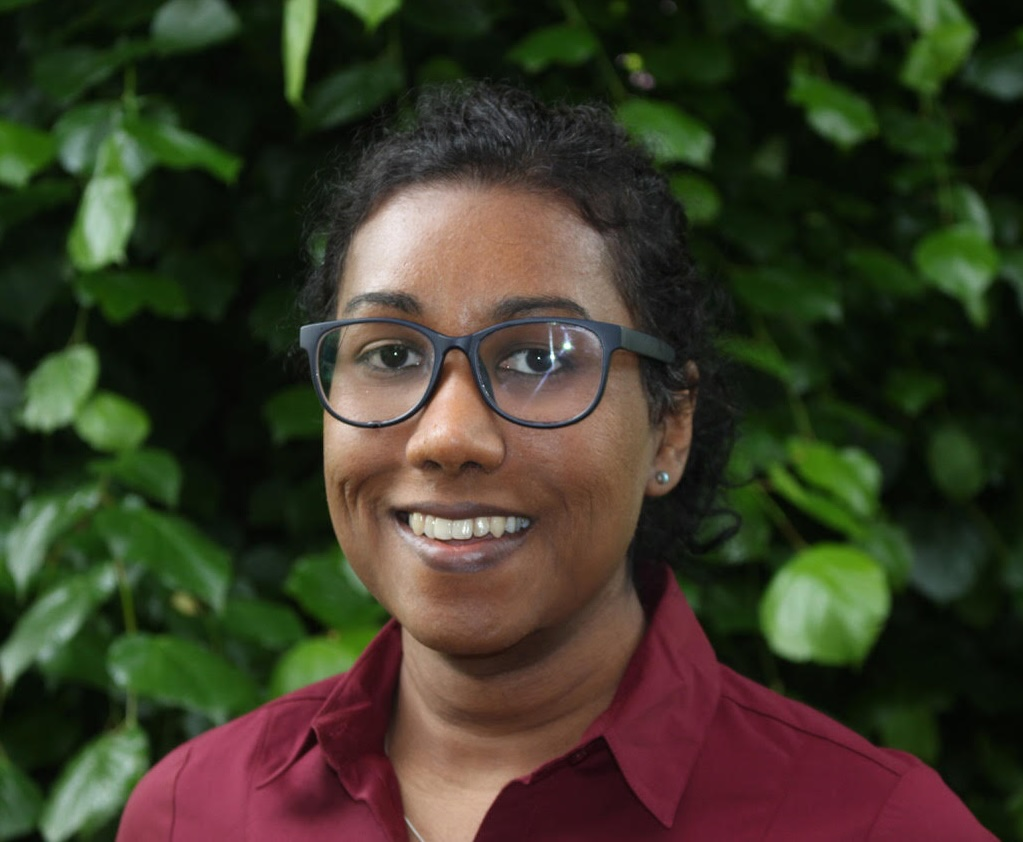
- Born: Sri Lanka
- Education: University of Auckland
- Known for: Microscopy, Calcium Signalling, Single Molecule Biophysics
- Scientific career
- Workplaces: University of New South Wales; University of Sheffield
- Website: sms.unsw.edu.au/izzy-jayasinghe

Izzy Jayasinghe is the Head of the Department of Molecular Medicine in the School of Biomedical Sciences at the University of New South Wales, and a Visiting Fellow at the University of Sheffield, where she was previously a UKRI Future Leader Fellow. Her research focuses on super resolution microscopy, biophysics, cardiac muscle and microscopy instrument development. In addition to her scientific research and teaching, she is a strong advocate for gender equality and diversity in academia.

== Education ==
Jayasinghe received a Bachelor of Science (BSc) with a major in cardiovascular sciences from the University of Auckland in 2007. She completed her doctor of philosophy (PhD) in physiology at the University of Auckland in 2010. In 2018, Jayasinghe became a Fellow of the Higher Education Academy receiving accreditation as a higher education provider approved by the UK Professional Standards Framework.

== Research and career ==
From 2010 to 2011, Jayasinghe was an assistant research fellow in the Department of Physiology in the University of Auckland. She was a post-doctoral research fellow in the School of Biomedical Sciences at the University of Queensland from 2011 to 2013. She then joined the College of Engineering, Mathematics and Physical Sciences at the University of Exeter as an associate research fellow from 2013 to 2015.

Jayasinghe was a lecturer in cardiovascular sciences in the Faculty of Biological Sciences at the University of Leeds from 2015 to 2020. In 2020, she joined the University of Sheffield as a UKRI Future Leader Fellow with the topic of "Taking super resolution microscopy beyond the laboratory" in the Department of Molecular Biology and Biotechnology.

== Equality, diversity and inclusion ==
Jayasinghe is a strong advocate of equality, diversity and inclusion. In 2019, she joined TigerinSTEMM, a group dedicated to champion equality, diversity and accessibility in the UK Science, technology, engineering, and mathematics education system. She also champions the rights of the LGBT+ community in academia and beyond. Jayasinghe gave a keynote talk entitled "Finding solace in STEM" at the fourth LGBT+ STEMinar in 2019 which gave a powerful account of her personal journey from her origins in Sri Lanka during civil war, her formative years in New Zealand where her passion for science started and experiences of the changing attitudes to LGBT+ rights throughout her career.

== Awards and honors ==
Jayasinghe is an elected member of the Women in Physics committee in the Institute of Physics.
