= Gavali, Karnataka =

Gavali Gawali
- Village
- Country: India
- State: Karnataka
- District: Belgaum

Government
  - Type: Panchayat raj

Population (2011)
  - Total: 373 (94 households)

Languages
  - Official: Kannada
- Time zone: UTC+5:30 (IST)
- ISO 3166 code: IN-KA
- Nearest city: Belgaum

Belgaum district, Karnataka state in India

Gavali (also Gawali) is a small village located in the Belgaum district, Karnataka state in India, southwest of the city of Belgaum. The village is surrounded by forests, waterways and falls, which are subject to illegal mining, removal of medicinal plants and deforestation.

A proposed Mandovi River (Mahadayi River) water diversion and hydroelectric power plant project would result in the submersion of some or all of Gavali.

== Geography ==
Sitting on a large plateau, the village is about 810 metres (2,660 ft) above sea level. It is surrounded by forests of the Western Ghats, one of the 18 global ecological hotspots, known for its dense forests, medicinal plants and trees, agricultural lands and mining resources that are at risk due to illegal mining, smuggling of medicinal plants and trees and deforestation. Over 500 acres of farmland was bought from Gavali village farmers by one person.

Gavali village is one of the identified Medicinal Plants Conservation Areas requiring eco-restoration.

Between the village of Gavali and Chapoli, the Mandovi River that flows to the beautiful 200 metres (660 ft) Vajrapoha Falls (also Vajrapoya waterfalls), best seen after the monsoon season (June–October). The falls are about 1.5 hours southwest of the city of Belgaum.

The Mandovi River (also called the Mahadayi River) is fed by streams near the villages of Gavali, Hemmadaga, Jamboti, Kankumbi, and Talawade. Lying in the mountainous Western Ghats (also called Sahyadris), the region may receive up to 3,800 to 5,700 millimetres (150 to 220 in) of rainfall per year. During the summer months (March–May) the stream and river water levels can become low, resulting in water shortages. The Gavali village temple area is thought by some to be the birthplace of the Mandovi river.

=== Proposed Mandovi River Dam project ===
A proposed Mandovi River (also Mahadayi River) water diversion and hydroelectric power project would result in submersion of 1,000 acres of agricultural land and 4,300 acres of forest. Some or all of Gavali would be submerged with other neighbouring towns. Under the project,

- the main Kotni dam would divert water above Khanapur and produce power
- five additional dams would be built to produce hydroelectric power
- six more dams would be built to divert water to the Malaprabha River.

The governmental plan, on hold for various reasons, to build the Kotni dam has been recently revived. While geologists determine whether the area can support a dam, Paryavarni, an environmental group, and the Goa government seek to stop the dam from being built and protect the regions delicate environment.

== Languages ==
Languages spoken in the area are Marathi, Kannada and in towns English is commonly spoken.

== Education ==
Baburao Thakur, a Gaud Saraswat Brahmin (GSB), was a noted journalist, freedom fighter and social worker who led the establishment of the Belgaum Jilha Prathamik Shikshan Samiti on 1 October 1937. The Samiti established its second primary school in the remote village of Gavali and 206 schools were established and managed by the Samiti by 1939. Although the teachers faced housing issues, poor sanitation, inadequate water supply and low wages, the schools became a model for the Government of Bombay (now Mumbai). In the course of the work in the remote communities, the Samiti developed adult education courses, built roads, advised on agricultural issues and developed programs for sanitation — all of which raised the local standard of living.

== Prehistoric rock art ==
Rock engravings are found at Gavali, Udupi made during the megalithic period of a side view of a humped bull.
