= Vajrapoha Falls =

Waterfall in Karnataka, India

Coordinates: 15°37′13″N 74°19′58″E

Vajrapoha Falls (also Vajrapoya waterfalls) is a waterfall in the Belgaum district of Karnataka in India. It is situated in a mountainous forest 8.5 kilometres (5.3 mi) in south west direction from the village of Jamboti. Between the village of Gavali and Chapoli on an elevated hillock, the Mandovi River that flows to the beautiful Vajrapoha Falls that fall for up to 200 metres (660 ft) and are best seen after the monsoon season (June–October). The falls are about 1.5 hours southwest of Belgaum.

The Mandovi River (also called the Mahadayi River) is fed by streams near the villages of Gavali, Hemmadaga, Jamboti, Kankumbi, and Talawade villages. Lying in the Western Ghats (also called Sahyadris) mountainous area, the region may receive up to 3,800 to 5,700 millimetres (150 to 220 in) of rainfall per year. During the summer months (March–May) the stream and river water levels can become low.

== See also ==
- List of waterfalls
- List of waterfalls in India
