= Talawade =

Talwawade may refer to:

- Talawade, Belgaum, a village in Karnataka, India
- Talawade, Pune, a village in Maharashtra India
- Talawade, Vikramgad, a village in Maharashtra, India
