= Kagganagi =

- Village
- Country: India
- State: Karnataka
- District: Belgaum
- Talukas: Khanapur

Languages
  - Official: Kannada
- Time zone: UTC+5:30 (IST)

Kagganagi is a village in Belgaum district in Karnataka, India.

Kagganagiis a small and multi cultural village on the bank of Malaprabha River. It is located in Western Ghats at 40 km from Belgaum district of Indian state Karnataka. Like most of the Indian villages it is not densely populated, approximately it is populated with around 3000 people. This village has not had a Tea Hotel (chai angadi) since it was settled (may be found in the 17th century), which makes it distinct from the other surrounding villages.

== Contents ==
- 1 Attractions
- 2 Education
- 3 Living
- 4 Weather
- 5 Transportation

== Living ==
Like other Indian villages, the primary occupation is farming. It is wet place (monsoon area) and is ideal place for paddy field cultivation. Paddy is the primary crop.

== Weather ==
Summer season spans from the months March to June. During summer weather is moderately hot with temperature ranging from 30 to 37 C. Mornings and evenings of summer season are very busy as all people come out of their houses and work in the farms to ready the farms to sow the paddy.

During the monsoon season which is usually from month of June to September, rain pours heavily. Entire farming land is covered with green paddy. This season is regarded as the people's favourite as they get leisure time to spend in playing with friends, kids and family.

Winter season starts from the month of November and lasts until February. Weather during this season is considerably chilly. Since it is harvesting time this is busiest of all three seasons. During the month of October and November Paddy changes to golden color.

== Transportation ==
In recent times transportation is not a big concern in this small place. It is very well connected to surrounding villages, Belgaum district and Khanapur Taluk since Government of Karnataka laid the JMR (Jilla Main Road) in the 1990s. A few years before like other Indian villages this tiny place was suffering from transportation problems. Since there were few government buses, people needed to travel for an entire day to reach destinations as near as 20 km away. People bought mini buses and started shuttles to main places. Nowadays there are a number of buses there to provide transportation.
