= NH 4A =

NH 4A may refer to:

- National Highway 4A (India)
- New Hampshire Route 4A, United States
