= Pattadakal =

World Heritage site with 7th- and 8th-century temples in India

Pattadakallu
- Pattadakallu (Kannada)
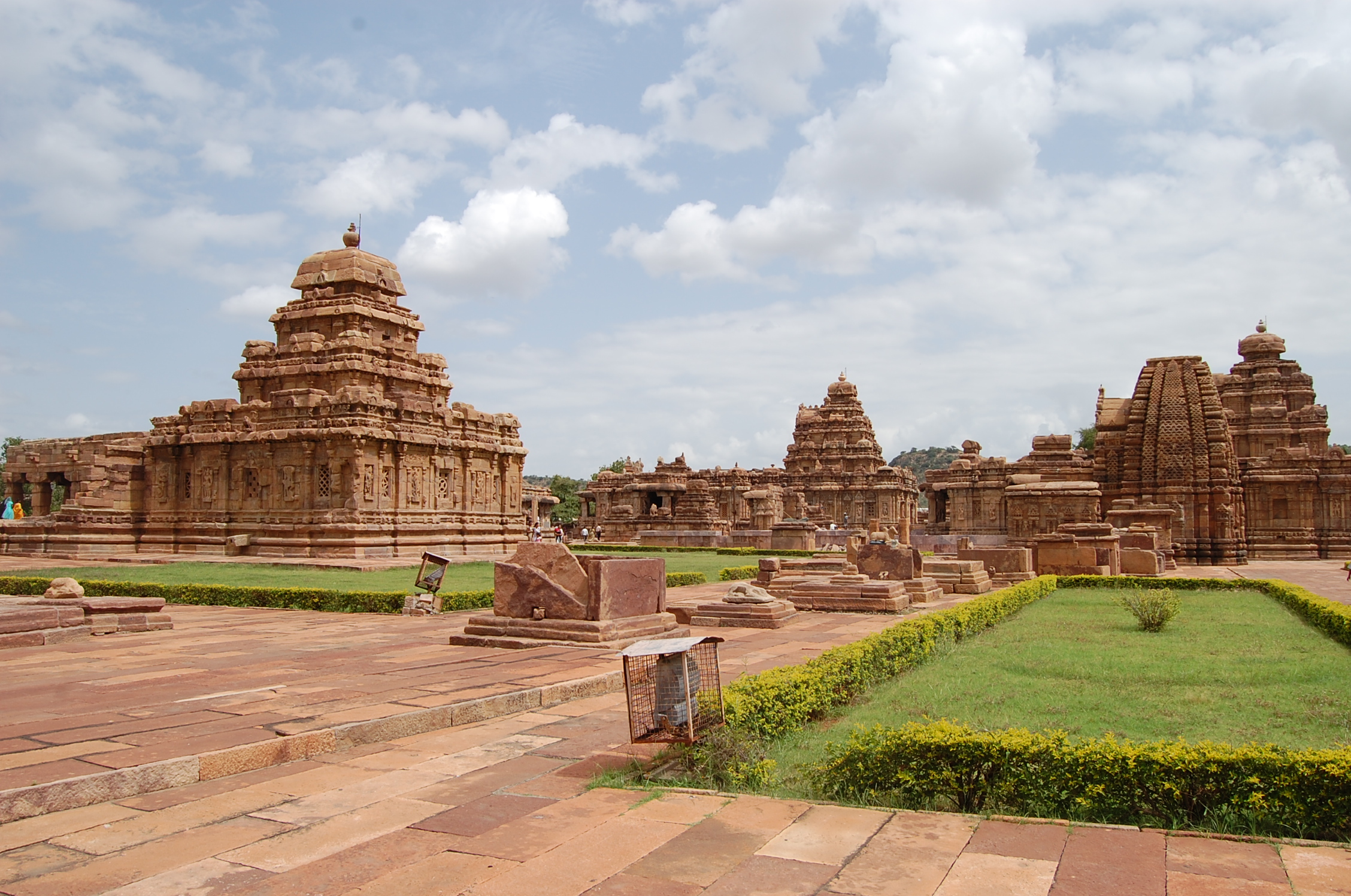
- Temples of Pattadakal

- Location within Karnataka Location within India
- 15°57′05″N 75°48′53″E
- Location: Bagalkot district, Karnataka, India

UNESCO World Heritage Site
- Type: Cultural
- Criteria: iii, iv
- Designated: 1987 (11th session)
- Reference no.: 239
- Region: Asia-Pacific

Pattadakal (Pattadakallu), also called Raktapura, is a complex of 7th and 8th century CE Hindu and Jain temples in northern Karnataka, India. Located on the west bank of the Malaprabha River in Bagalkot district, this UNESCO World Heritage Site is 23 kilometres (14 mi) from Badami and about 9.7 kilometres (6 mi) from Aihole, both of which are historically significant centres of Chalukya monuments. The monument is a protected site under Indian law. It is managed by the Archaeological Survey of India (ASI).

UNESCO has described Pattadakal as "a harmonious blend of architectural forms from northern and southern India" and an illustration of "eclectic art" at its height. The Hindu temples are generally dedicated to Shiva, but elements of Vaishnavism and Shaktism theology and legends are also featured. The friezes in the Hindu temples display various Vedic and Puranic concepts, depict stories from the Ramayana, the Mahabharata, the Bhagavata Purana, as well as elements of other Hindu texts, such as the Panchatantra and the Kirātārjunīya. The Jain temple is only dedicated to a single Jina. The most sophisticated temples, with complex friezes and a fusion of Northern and Southern styles, are found in the Papanatha and Virupaksha temples. The Virupaksha temple is an active house of Hindu worship.

The Malaprabha River, a tributary of the Krishna River cutting across the valley of mountains surrounded by the plains, has great importance and place in the history of South India. The origin of this river is from Kanakumbi, Belagavi district, in the Western Ghats region, and it flows towards the eastern side. Just one kilometre (0.62 mi) before reaching Pattadakal, it starts flowing from south to north. As per the Hindu tradition, a river that flows in the north direction is also called Uttarvahini Ganga.

== Location ==
The Pattadakal monuments are located in the Indian state of Karnataka, about 165 kilometres (103 mi) northeast of Belgaum, 265 kilometres (165 mi) northeast of Goa, 14 miles (23 km) from Badami via Karnataka state highway SH14, and about 6 miles (9.7 km) from Aihole, set amid sandstone mountains and the Malaprabha river valley. In total, there are over 150 Hindu, Jain, and Buddhist monuments, and archaeological discoveries, dating from the 4th to 10th century CE, in addition to prehistoric dolmens and cave paintings that are preserved at the Pattadakal-Badami-Aihole site.

Nearby airports to Pattadakal

- Sambra Belgaum Airport (IATA Code: IXG), a 3-hour drive to the west, which operates daily flights to Mumbai, Bangalore and Chennai.
- Hubballi airport is also a 3-hour drive from Pattadkal. Hubballi airport is well connected to Bengaluru, Mumbai, Chennai, Kochi, Delhi

Access to the site by train is also possible via an Indian Railways service that stops at Badami on the Hubballi-Solapur line.

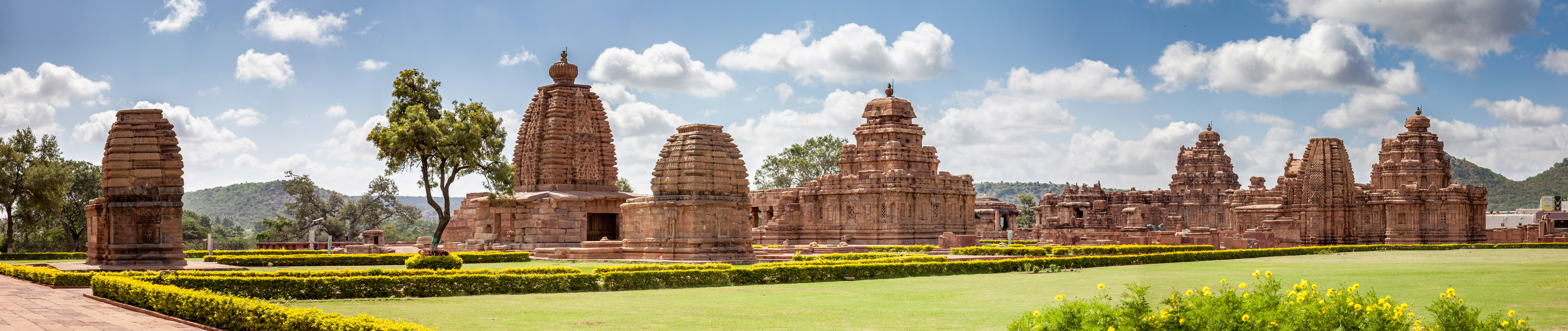
View of the main group at Pattadakal.

== History ==
Pattadakal ("Stone of coronation") was considered a holy place, being where the Malaprabha River turned northwards towards the Himalayas and the Kailasha mountain (uttara-vahini). As its name implies, it was used during the Chalukya dynasty for coronation ceremonies, such as that of Vinayaditya in the 7th century CE. Other names this place was known by were Kisuvolal meaning "valley of red soil", Raktapura meaning "city of red", and Pattada-Kisuvolal meaning "red soil valley for coronation". The site, states Archaeological Survey of India, is mentioned in texts by Srivijaya and is referred to by Ptolemy as "Petirgal" in his Geography.

The early rulers of the Chalukya during the 5th – 6th century were Vaishnavites (a community that believes and offers prayers to Lord Vishnu, followers of Vaishnavism) and then converted themselves into Shaivaites (a community that believes and offers prayers to Lord Shiva and followers of Shaivism). Hence, the temples in and around this compound are dedicated to Lord Shiva.

Pattadakal became, along with nearby Aihole and Badami, a major cultural centre and religious site for innovations in architecture and experimentation of ideas. The rule of the Gupta Empire during the 5th century brought about a period of political stability, during which Aihole became a locus of scholarship. The experimentation in architecture extended into Badami over the course of the next two centuries. This culture of learning encompassed Pattadakal in the 7th century, which became a nexus where ideas from northern and southern India fused. It was during this latter period that the Chalukya empire constructed many of the temples in Aihole-Badami-Pattadakal region.

After the fall of the Chalukya Empire, the region was annexed by the Rashtrakuta kingdom, who would rule over the region into the 10th century. In the 11th century, and into the 12th century, the region came under the rule of the Late Chalukyas (Western Chalukya Empire, Chalukyas of Kalyani), an offshoot of the Early Chalukya Empire. Although the area was not a capital region, nor in proximity to one, numerous sources such as inscriptions, contemporaneous texts and the architectural style indicate that, from the 9th to 12th centuries, new Hindu, Jain and Buddhist temples and monasteries continued to be built in the Pattadakal region. Historian George Michell attributes this to the presence of a substantial population and its burgeoning wealth.

In the advent of the 14th century, Pattadakal, the Malaprabha valley, as well as much of the Deccan region, was subject to raids and plunder by the Delhi Sultanate armies that devastated the region. This period ended with the rise of the Vijayanagara Empire. It was responsible for the construction of forts for the protection of the monuments, as evidenced by inscriptions in the fort at Badami. Pattadakal was a part of the border region that witnessed wars between Vijayanagara and the Sultanates to its north. Following the collapse of the Vijayanagara Empire in 1565, Pattadakal was annexed by the Sultanate of Bijapur, which was ruled by the Adil Shahi dynasty. In the late 17th century, the Mughal Empire, under Aurangzeb, gained control of Pattadakal from the Sultanate. After the collapse of the Mughal Empire, Pattadakal came under the control of the Maratha Empire. It later changed hands, yet again, when Haider Ali and Tipu Sultan wrested control of it in the late 18th century, but would lose it when the British defeated Tipu Sultan and annexed the region.

The monuments at Pattadakal are evidence of the existence, and the history, of interaction between the early northern and southern styles of Hindu arts. According to T. Richard Blurton, the history of temple arts in northern India is unclear as the region was repeatedly sacked by invaders from Central Asia, particularly during the Muslim incursions from the 11th century onward. The subsequent "warfare has greatly reduced the quantity of surviving examples". The Pattadakal monuments, completed in the 7th and 8th centuries, are among the earliest surviving examples of these early religious arts and ideas.

Prehistoric Monuments

Based on some recent findings by Archeologist and prehistorian Prof. Ravi Korisettar, published in works for the National Institute of Advanced Studies, India, the Early Chalukyan artisans were not the first to build monuments in the Malaprabha Valley. At Bachinnagudda, just a couple of kilometres west of Pattadakallu, along the road leading to Badami, is a rough-looking monument believed to date back to the Iron Age (approximately 1200 BCE – 500 BCE). This monument, called a dolmen, belongs to a class of structures called megaliths, which were erected all over southern India mostly during the Iron Age and the succeeding Early Historic period.

== Description ==
=== Site layout ===
There are ten major temples at Pattadakal, nine Hindu and one Jain, along with numerous small shrines and plinths. Eight of the major temples are clustered together, a ninth one about half a kilometer south of this cluster, and the tenth, a Jain temple, located about a kilometer to the west of the main cluster. The Hindu temples are all connected by a walkway, while the Jain temple has road access.

=== Style ===
The Pattadakal monuments reflect a fusion of two major Indian architectural styles, one from north India (Rekha-Nagara-Prasada) and the other from south India (Dravida-Vimana). Four temples were built in the Chalukya Dravida style, four in the Nagara style of Northern India. In contrast, the Papanatha temple is a fusion of the two. The nine Hindu temples are all dedicated to Shiva, and are on the banks of the Malaprabha River. The oldest of these temples is Sangameshwara, which was built during the reign of Vijayaditya Satyashraya, between 697 and 733 CE. The largest of these temples in Pattadakal is the Virupaksha Temple, which was built between 740 and 745 CE.

The last temple built in the Group of Monuments is the Jain temple, known locally as the Jain Narayana temple, which was likely built in the 9th century during the reign of Krishna II of Rashtrakutas. Its style is patterned on the lines of the Kailasanatha temple at Kanchipuram.

The temple structures were built using the sandstones found abundantly locally at Pattadakkal. Some of the sculptures are carved from polished black granite.

=== Kadasiddheshwara temple ===
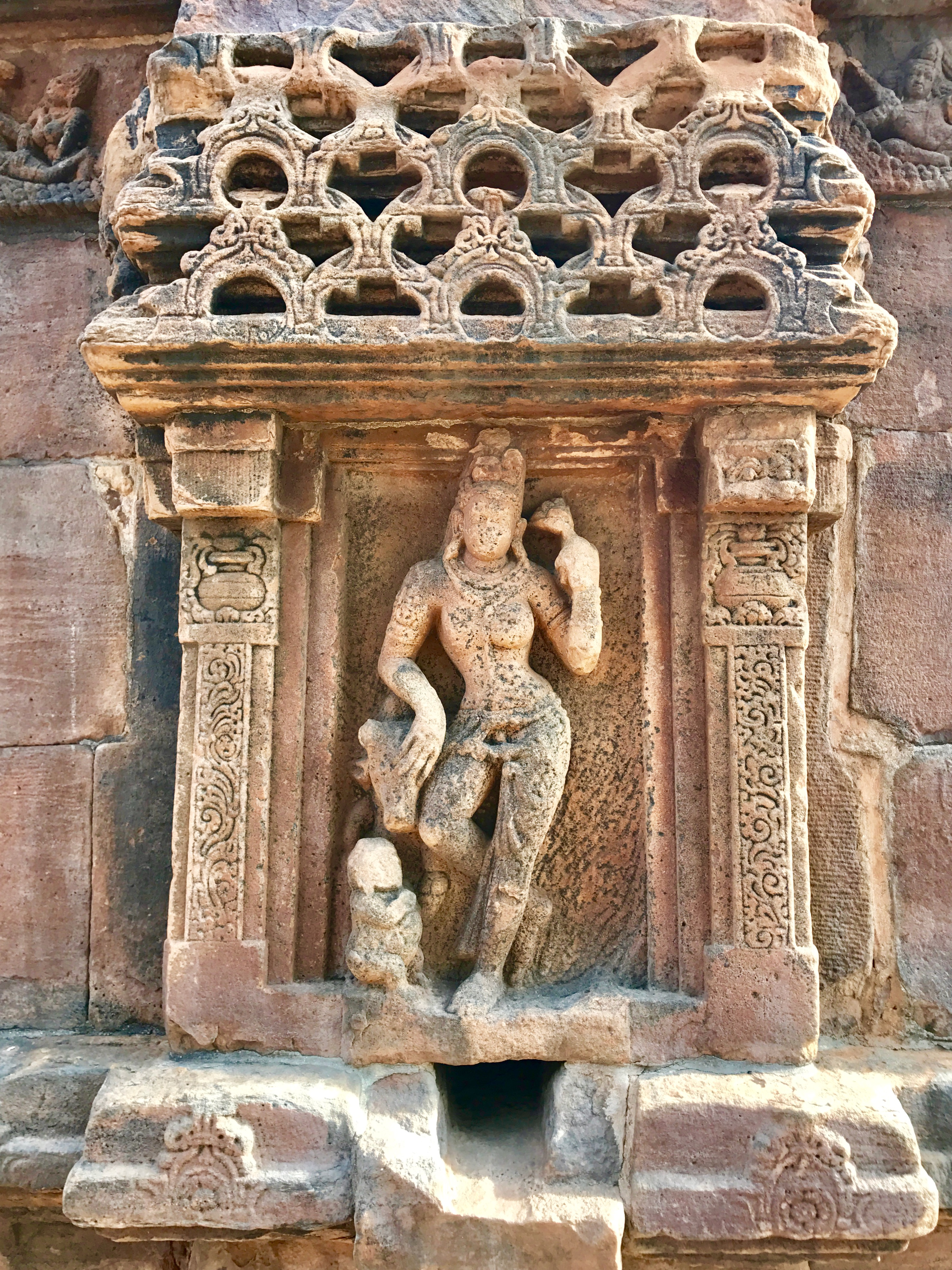
Ardhanarishvara (left half Shiva, right half Parvati) at the Kadasiddheswara temple.

A relatively small temple, the Archaeological Survey of India has dated it to around the mid-7th century CE, but George Michell dates it to the early 8th century. The temple faces east and is built around a square garbha griha (sacrum sanctum). It houses a linga on a peetha (platform); there is a mantapa around the sacrum center. Much of the temple has been eroded or was damaged in the following centuries. The Shikhara (spire) is a northern Nagara style (Rekhanagara) with a sukanasa projection on the east. The sukanasa has a damaged Nataraja accompanied by Parvati.

The outer walls of the Kada Siddheshwara sanctum feature images of Ardhanarishvara (half Shiva, half Parvati) on its north, Harihara (half Shiva, half Vishnu) to its west and Lakulisha to the south. Mounted on a lintel at the sanctum entrance is Shiva and Parvati flanked by Brahma and Vishnu on either side. The steps at the sanctum entrance are flanked by the river goddesses Ganga and Yamuna, with attendants.

=== Jambulingeshwara temple ===
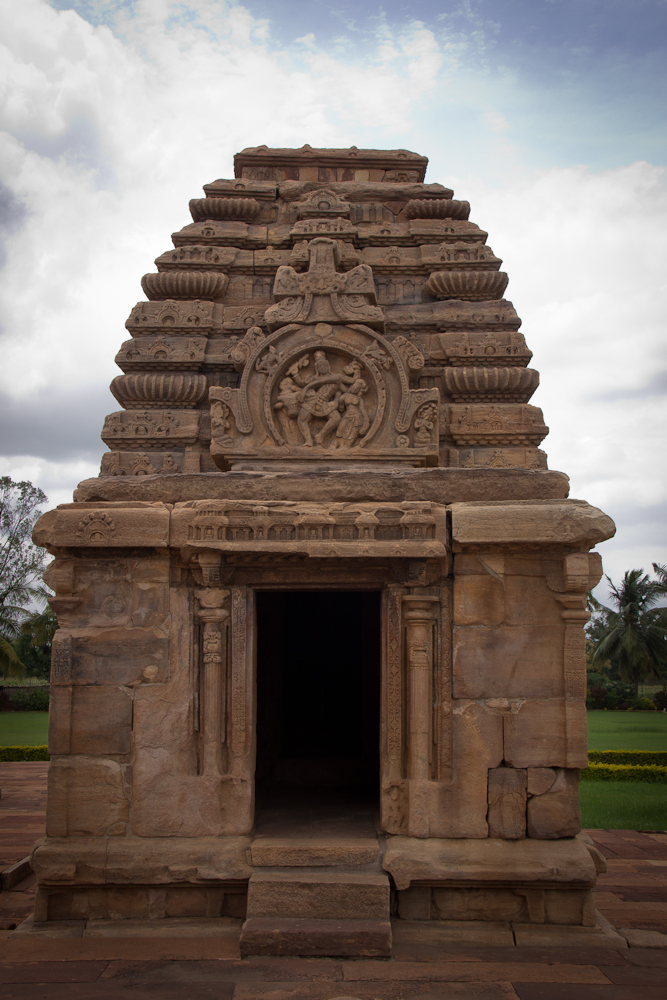
The Nataraja sukanasa on Jambulingeshwara temple spire.

Another small temple, the Jambulingeshwara Temple, also called the Jambulinga Temple, is variously estimated by ASI and Michell to have been completed between the mid-7th and early 8th centuries, respectively. The temple is built around a square garbha griha (sacrum sanctum), whose outer walls feature intricate devakoshtha (linteled niches with decorated frames with Hamsa and mythical makaras). Inside the frames are images of Vishnu on its north, Surya (Sun god) to its west, and Lakulisha to the south. The temple also experiments with the idea of projecting sukanasa from the shikhara in front, over the mandapa. The temple still faces east, greeting the sunrise. The Nandi too is provided with a raised platform, which is in ruins, and the Nandi image shows signs of erosion. The dancing Shiva Nataraja with Parvati and Nandi by his side on the frontal arch sukanasa is better preserved.

The style of the temple is northern rekha-nagara with a curvilinear profile of squares diminishing as they rise towards the sky. The amalaka and kalasha of the northern style, however, are damaged and not in place. The entrance of the Jambulingeshwara mandapa is decorated with three shakhas, each with purnakumbhas below their capitals. A swan-themed frieze covers the passageway with the faint remains of the carvings of swans, kutas and salas.

=== Galaganatha Temple ===
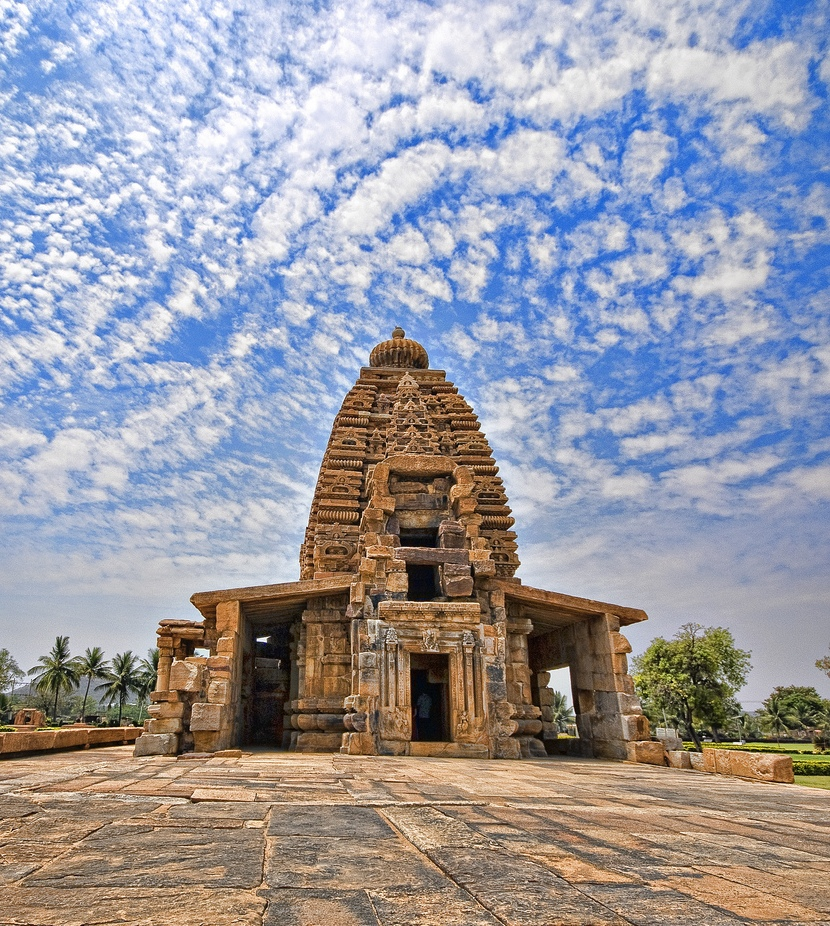
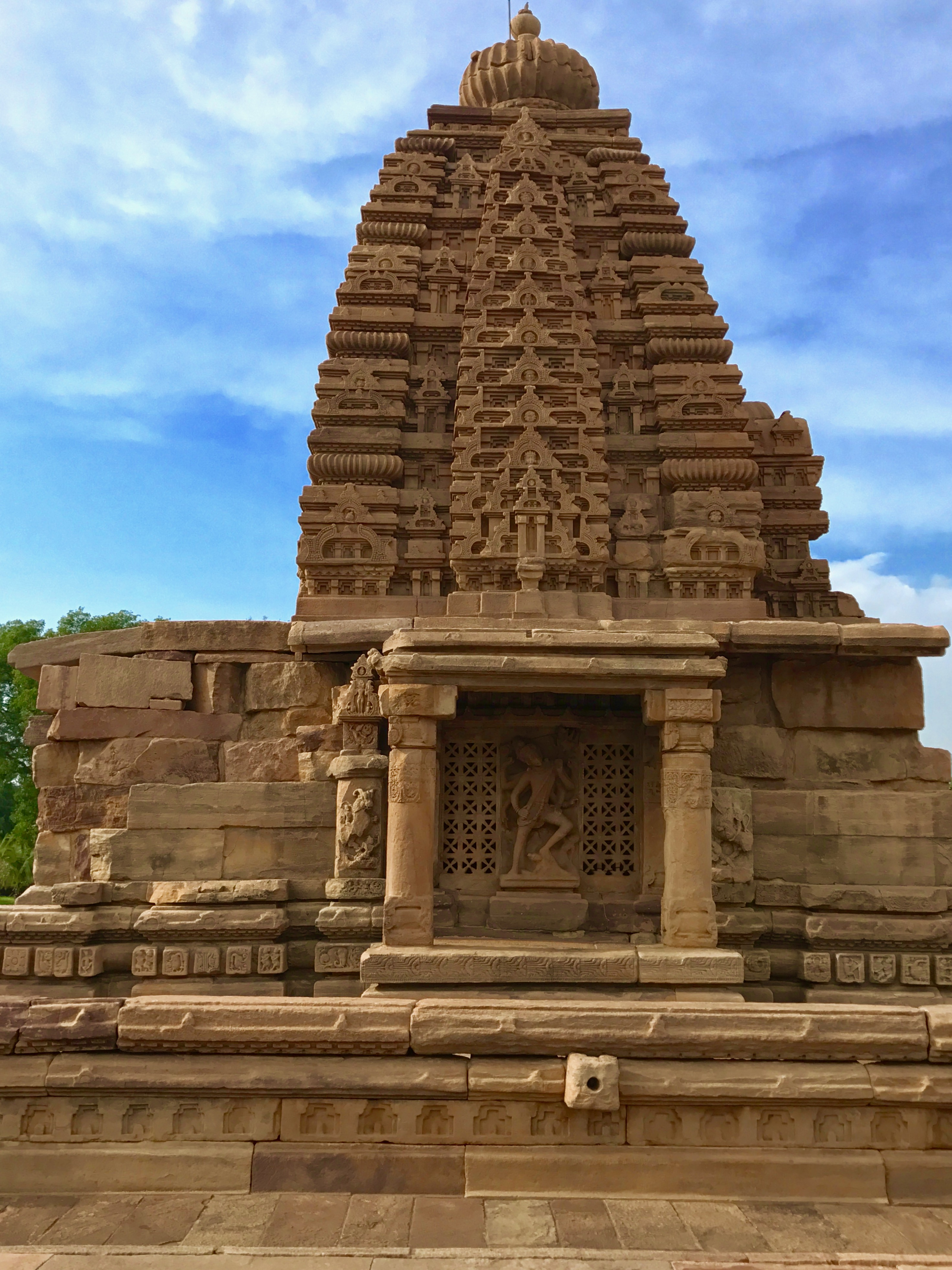
Left: Galaganatha Temple's sabha mandapa floor and covered pradakshina patha; Right: Shiva carving.

The Galaganatha temple lies to the east of the Jambulingeshwara temple. Unlike the previous two temples, ASI estimates this temple to be from the mid-8th century, whereas Michell states that it is likely from the late 7th century. The temple is a northern rekha-nagara style with a linga and a vestibule (antarala) within the temple sanctum (garbha griha). Outside the temple is a seated Nandi that faces the sanctum.

The sanctum has a covered circumambulatory path (pradakshina patha), indicating that this Hindu tradition was well established by the 7th to 8th century. Various mandapas exist in this temple, such as a social or community hall (sabha mantapa), used for ceremonial functions, and a mukha mantapa, of which only the foundation remains. The entrance to the mantapa is flanked by the river goddesses Ganges and Yamuna.

The Galagatha temple is mostly in ruins, except for the southern part, which contains a carved slab showing an eight-armed Shiva killing the demon Andhaka, while wearing a garland of skulls as a yajnopavita (sacred thread across the chest).

According to Michell, the Galaganatha temple is notable for being almost an exact copy of the Svarga Brahma temple of Alampur in Andhra Pradesh, a temple that is dated to 689 CE. Given that both Alampur and Pattadakal were a part of the Badami Chalukya kingdom, an exchange of ideas is likely. The basement of the eastern molding is notable for depicting friezes of Panchatantra fables, such as that of the mischievous monkey and the fable of the two-headed bird.

=== Chandrashekhara Temple ===
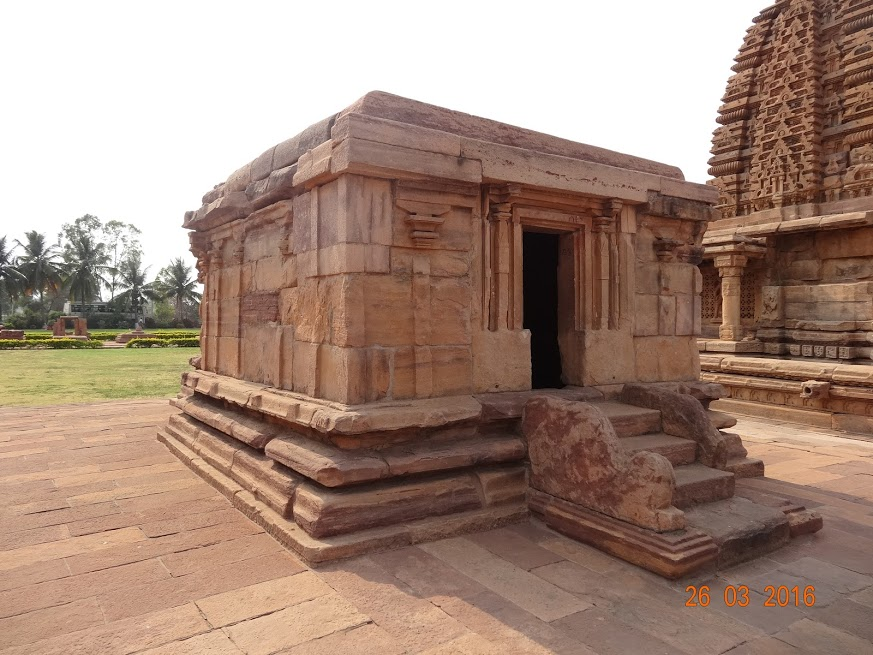
Chandrashekhara temple.

Chandrashekhara temple is a small east-facing temple without a tower. It is situated on the south side of the Galaganatha temple. This temple has been dated by Michell to the late 9th or early 10th century, whereas the ASI dates it to the mid-8th century.

The temple has a garbha griha with a Shiva linga and a closed hall; a Nandi sits on a platform to the east facing the linga. It is laid out within a space 33.33 feet in length and 17.33 feet in breadth, on an adhishthana (platform based on certain design rules in Hindu texts). Detailed Pilasters, yet lacking in ornamentation, decorate the exterior walls of the temple. There is a devakostha (niche) in the walls on either side of the Chandrashekhara temple sanctum. The temple lacks a lintel, but features a dvarapala (guardian) on each side of the entrance; the door frames are carved with shakhas.

=== Sangameshwara Temple ===
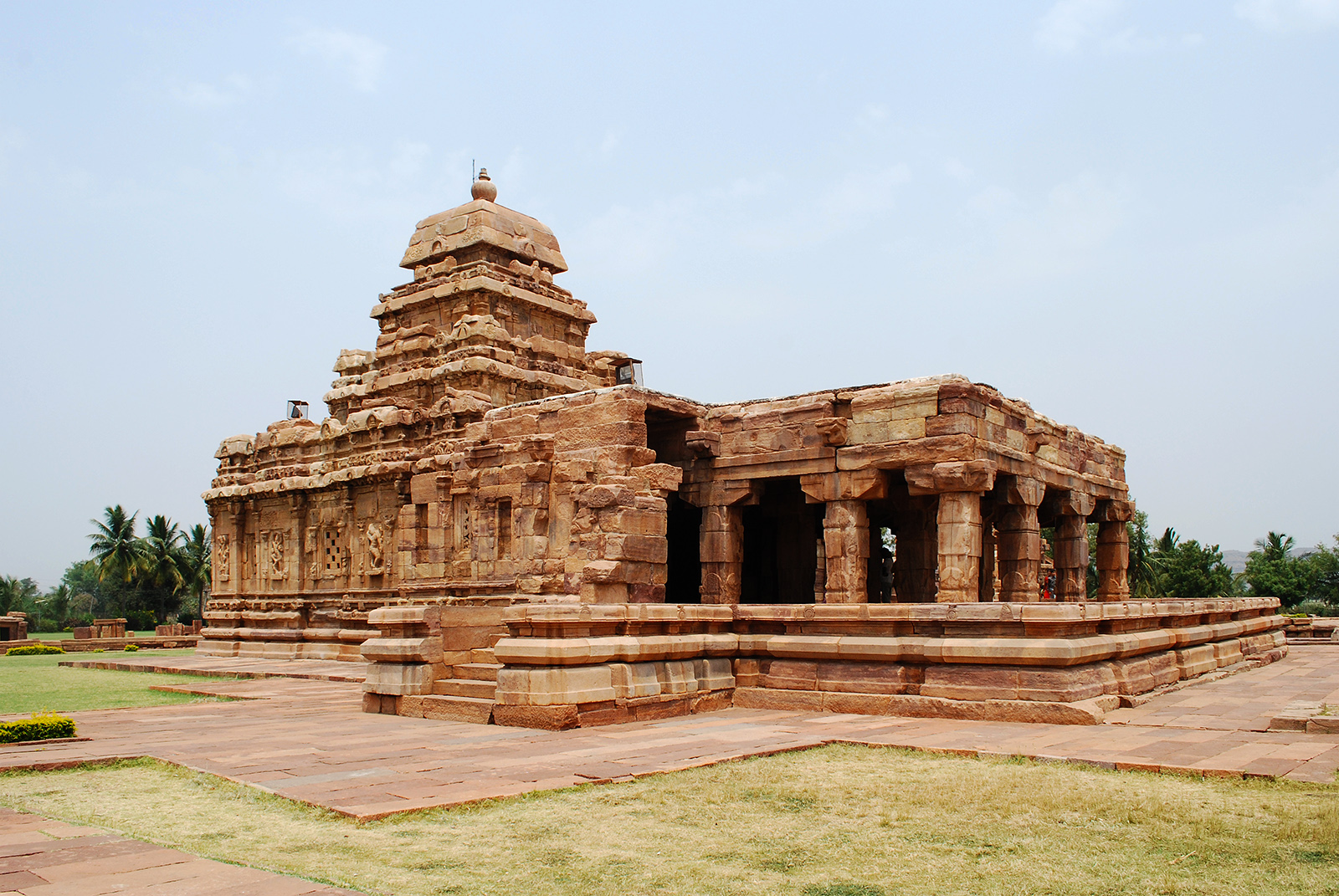
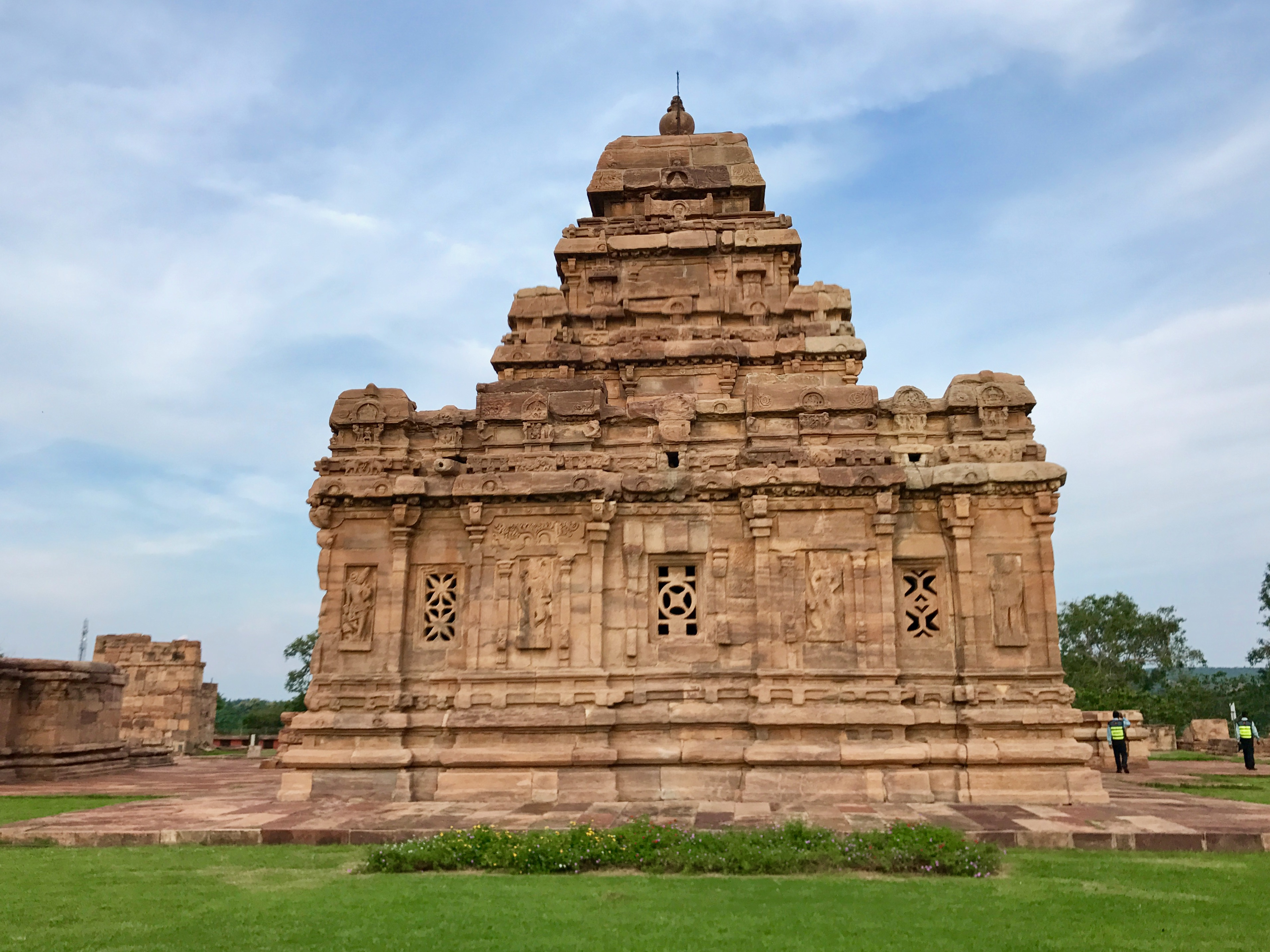
Left: Sangameshwara Temple's pillared entrance; Right: A side showing experimentation with window styles and wall carvings.

Sangameshwara temple, also called the Vijayeshvara temple, is a large, Dravida-style east-facing temple located on the south side of the Chandrashekhara temple. Inscriptions at the temple, and other evidence, date it to between 720 CE and 733 CE. The death of its patron king, Vijayaditya, in 734 CE resulted in the temple being left unfinished, although work continued intermittently in later centuries. During the Badami Chalukya reign, between 543 and 757 CE, other important Sangameshwara temples were built, such as the one at KuDavelli; in modern times, this temple was relocated to Alampur, after extensive restoration work. The inscriptions found in this and other temples mention sponsor names from different centuries, including those of Hindu queens, suggesting they actively supported the temple architecture and arts.

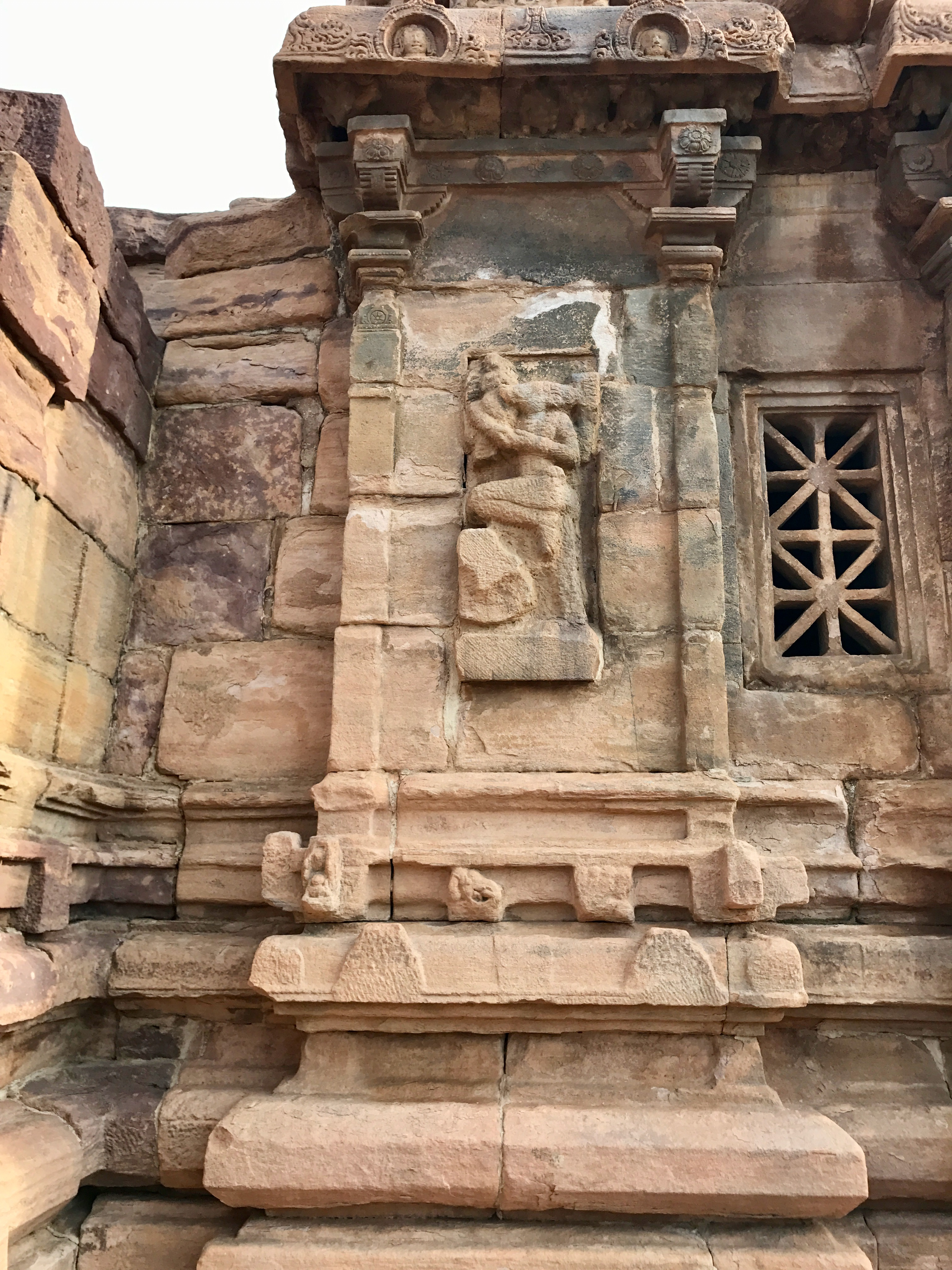
Incomplete Vishnu avatar Varaha relief on Sangameswara Shaiva temple wall.

Although the temple is not the largest among those at Pattadakal, it is nonetheless of imposing proportions. The temple has a square layout, with an east facing sanctum. The sanctum is surrounded by a covered pradakshina patha (circumambulatory path) lit by three carved windows. Inside the sanctum is a Shiva Linga. In front of the sanctum is a vestibule that is flanked on each side by smaller shrines. These shrines once contained carvings of Ganesha and Durga, but the carvings have since gone missing. Further east of the hall is a seated Nandi. Past the vestibule is a mandapa within which are sixteen massive pillars set in groups of four, which may have been added after construction of the temple was completed.

The vimana superstructure above the temple and the outer walls of the temple are well preserved. The vimana is a two-tiered structure, crowned with a square kuta-sikhara and kalasha. The temple walls contain many devakostha (niches) carved with images of Vishnu and Shiva, some of which are in various stages of completion. The temple is built on a raised molded base, with decorative friezes of elephants, yali, and makara, mythical creatures. Above the kapota (eaves) are detailed friezes of ganas (playful dwarfs), who are portrayed as if they are struggling to hold the weight of the temple structure. The parapet displays hara (various kinds of string in Hindu temple texts) of various styles, including karnakutas (square), and salas (oblong), which flow with the design below them and are decorated with kudus.

Shaivism, Vaishnavism, and Shaktism themes are presented in the carvings at the temple. The Shaiva iconography includes a dancing Nataraja, Ardhanarishvara (half Shiva, half Parvati as essential halves of each other), Shiva with Bhringi, Shiva spearing the demon Andhaka, and the yogi, Lakulisha. The Vaishnava iconography includes avatars of Vishnu such as Varaha lifting goddess earth (Bhudevi).

Excavations into the foundations of its ruined hall, in 1969 and 1971, revealed the archaeologically significant discovery of a brick temple structure beneath the hall. This discovery led to the proposal that Sangameshwara had been built over an older temple, possibly dating to the 3rd century CE.

=== Kashi Vishwanatha Temple ===
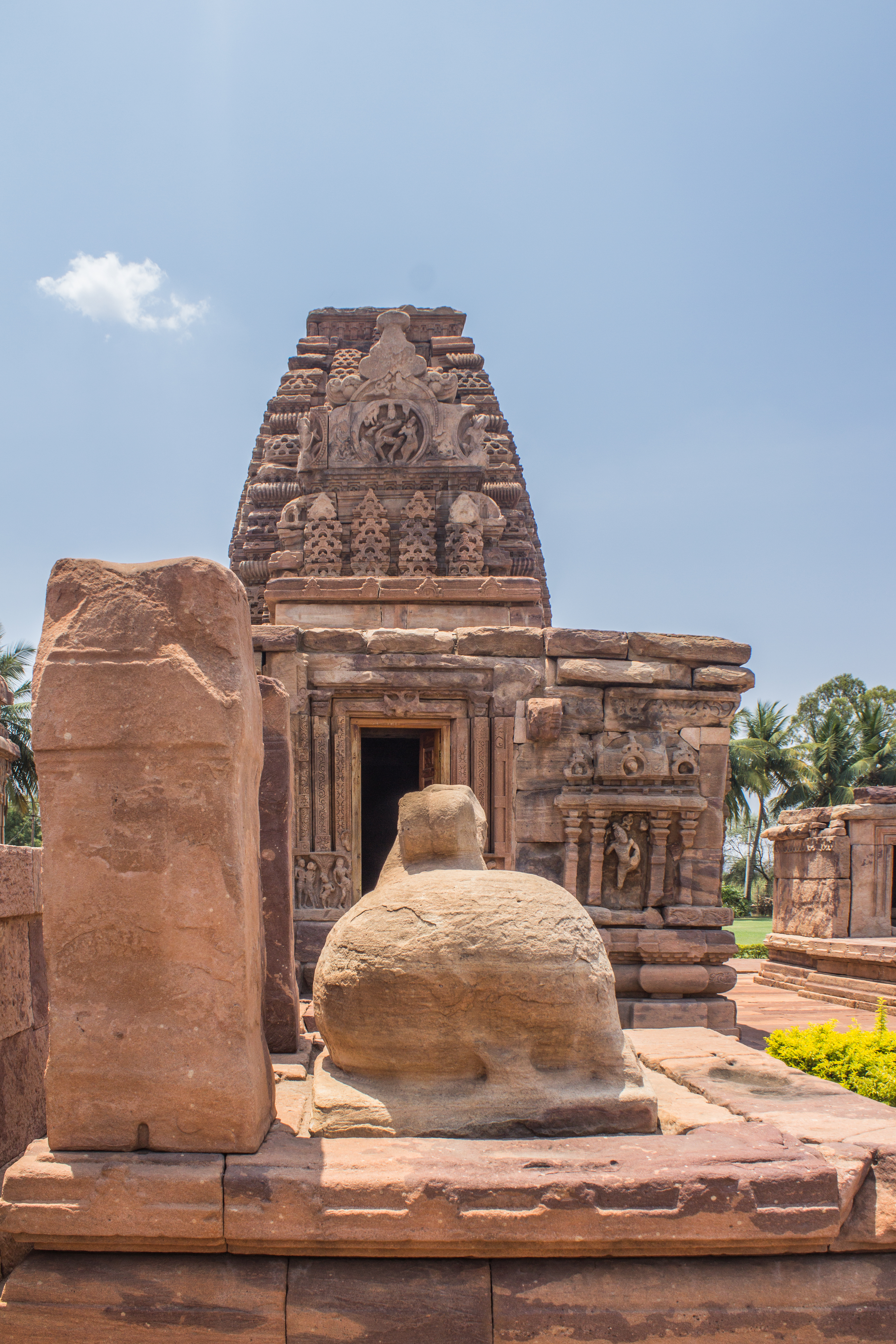
Kashi Vishwanatha temple with Nandi facing the sanctum.

Also known as Kashivishweswara, the Kashi Vishwanatha temple is another of the smaller temples at Pattadakal. The temple has been variously dated to the late 7th century, early 8th century, or the mid-8th century.

Much like the other temples, the core of the Kashi Vishwanatha temple is the square garbha griha (sanctum), which houses a linga. To the east of the garbha griha is the moulded platform of a Nandi-mantapa, featuring the image of a seated Nandi. The temple also features a pranala, a stone structure used to drain out water used during devotional activities, and an antarala, or foyer, connecting to a mantapa with a ruined entrance porch. The river goddesses Ganga and Yamuna are still visible at the entrance to the mantapa. The temple sits on a raised platform, with five layers of mouldings, decorated with 8th-century carvings of horses, elephants, lions, peacocks, and flowery vine designs. The wall surfaces have pilaster pairs supporting chaitya-style arches. The entrance door features a Shaiva dvarapala (guardian) on each side.

Sculptures of Ardhanariswara (half-Shiva, half-Parvati) and Lakulisha are carved into the northern wall of the temple mantapa, but these have been damaged and defaced. The kapota (cornice) are decorated with motifs and carved with ganas (playful dwarfs) carrying garlands; brackets show flying couples and kirtimukhas.

The superstructure, displaying a well-developed North Indian Rekha-Nagara style, is a rising five-stage projection of centered squares with a complex pattern of interlocking gavakshas, but the amalaka and kalasha are now missing. The sukanasa, mounted on a spire in front of the temple, is of a dancing Uma-Maheshwara (Parvati-Shiva) set inside a chaitya-arch.

Inside the temple are pillars and pilasters intricately carved with friezes depicting the Bhagavata Purana (Vaishnavism), the Shiva Purana (Shaivism) and the Ramayana. One frieze shows the demon Ravana lifting mount Kailasha, others show the playful pranks of Krishna. At the same time, another narrates the Kalyansundarmurti (marriage of Shiva and Parvati). One relief in particular shows Shiva coming out of the cylindrical linga. The mandapa ceiling has carvings of Shiva, Nandi, and Parvati holding Kartikeya. This image is concentrically surrounded by the ashta-dikpalas (eight directional guardians).

=== Trailokeshwara Temple ===
Trillokeshwara temple is a mid-8th-century Shiva temple sponsored by queen Trailokyamahadevi. It is located south of the Kashi Vishwanatha temple, southwest of the Sangameshwara temple and in proximity to Virupaksha. The temple was built about the same time as the Virupaksha temple, with a similar design and layout, but is somewhat smaller and has a few important differences.

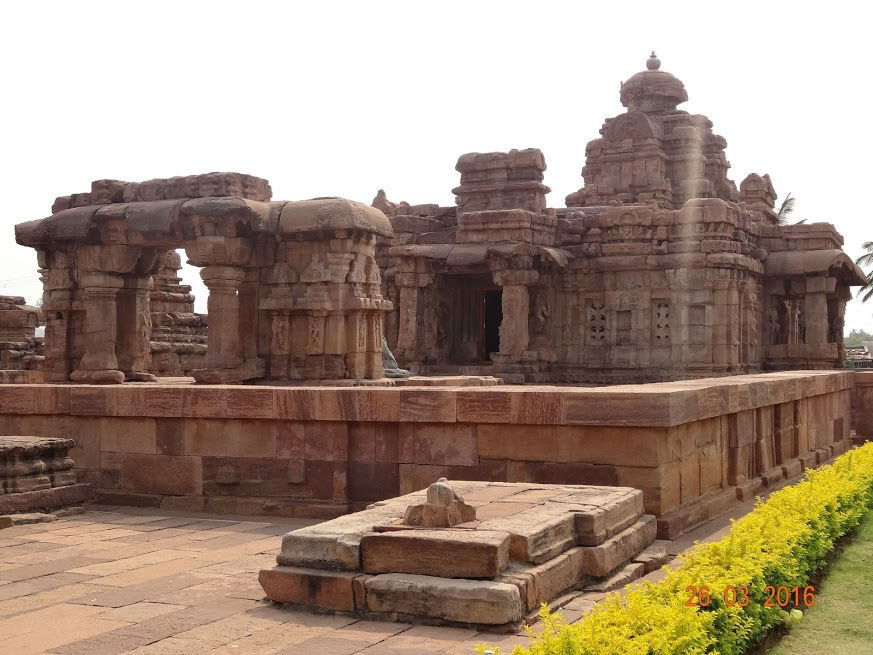
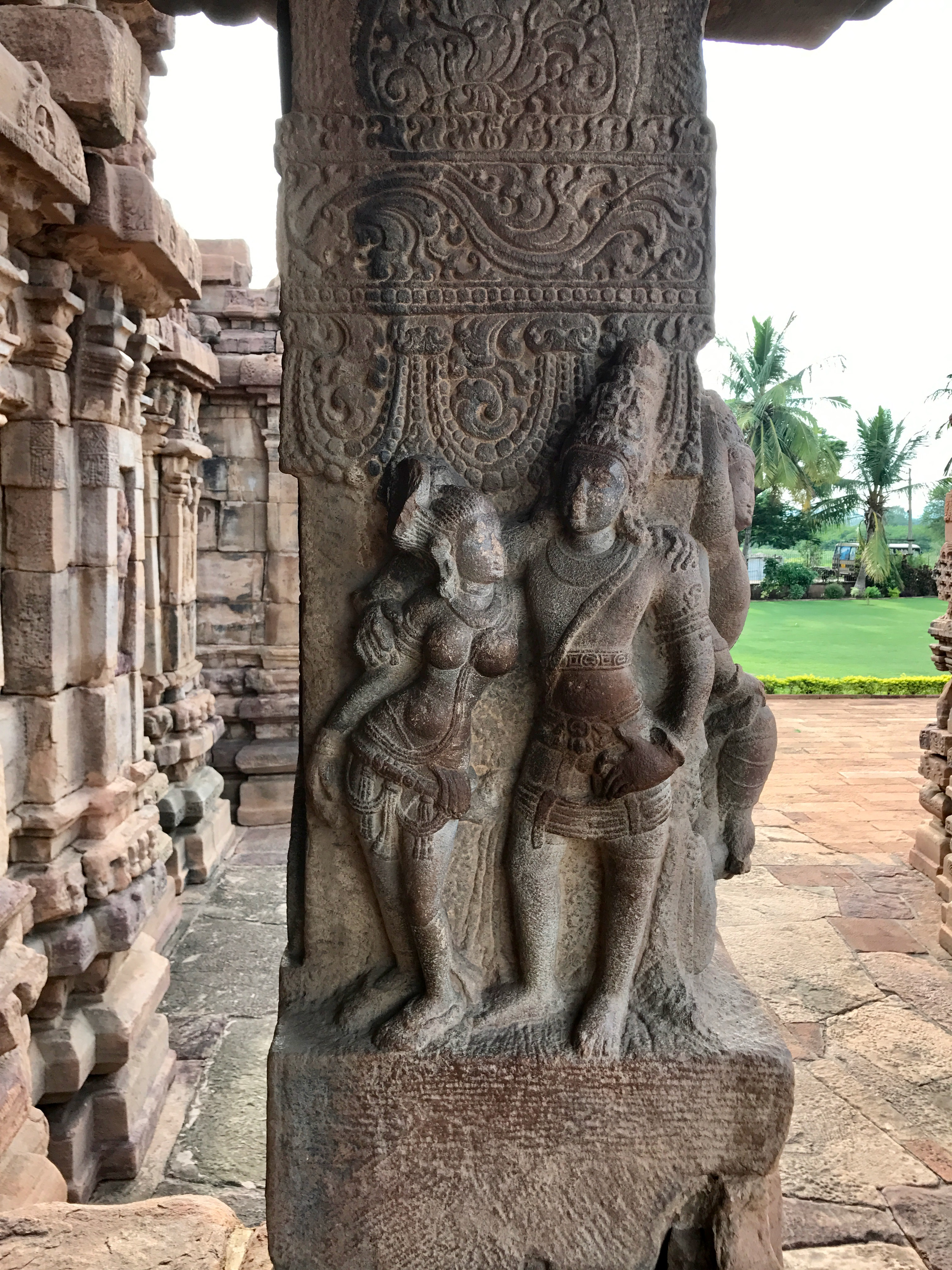
Left: Mallikarjuna Temple walled entrance; Right: A wall carving.

The temple reflects a fully developed South Indian vimana-style architecture. Its garbha griya (sanctum) has a Shiva linga, and features a circumambulatory path (pradakshina patha). In front of the sanctum is an antechamber (antarala) with small shrines for Durga as Mahishasuramardini killing the buffalo demon and another for Ganesha on each side, both currently empty. A Nandi-mantapa is included in the temple wherein Nandi faces the sanctum. Access to the sanctum is through a pillared sabha-mantapa (community hall) with entrance porches, enclosures (prakara) and a gateway (pratoli).

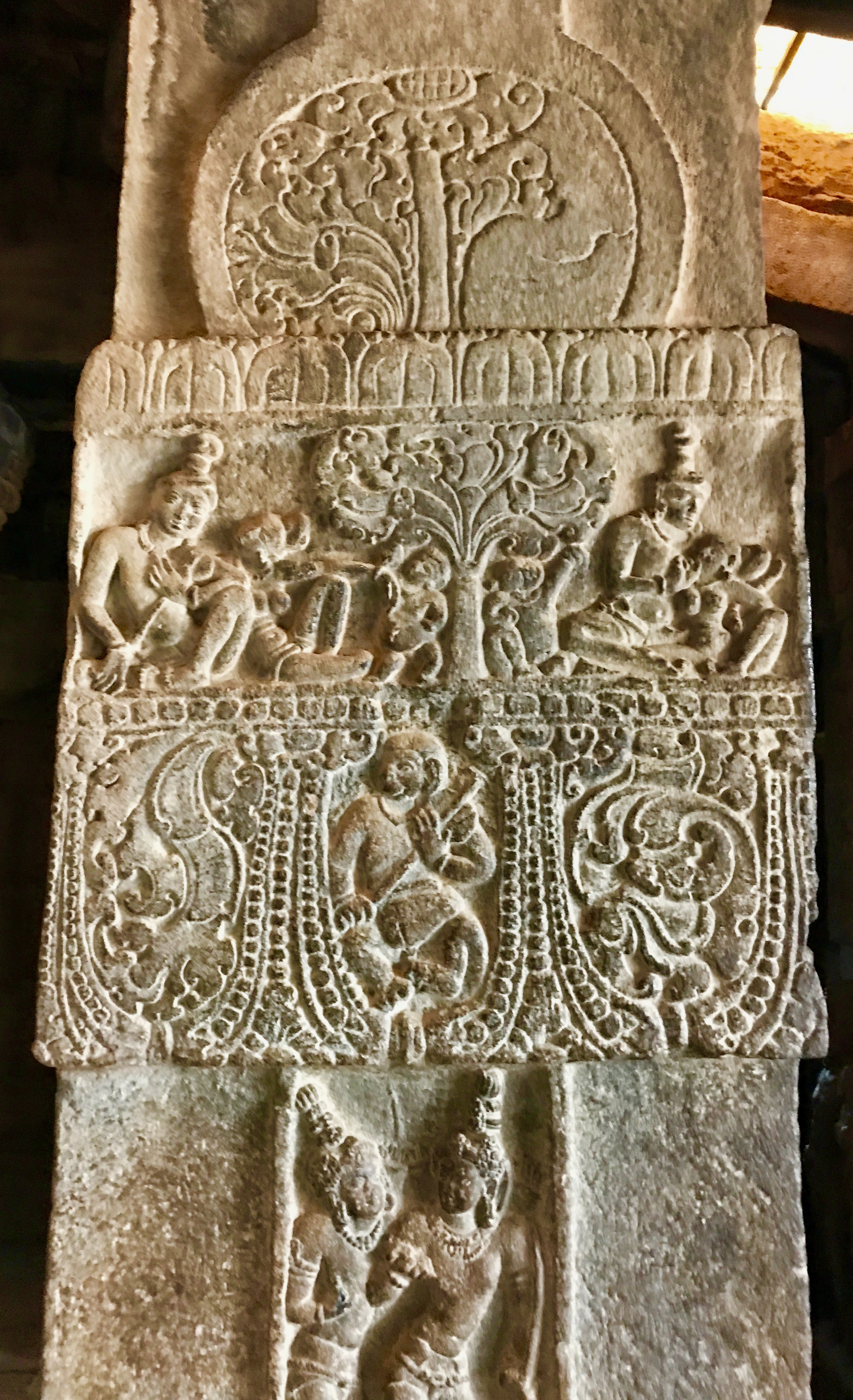
Lovers inside Mallikarjuna temple.

The temple, though similar to the Virupaksha temple, experiments with new architectural ideas that make it distinct. The depiction of a dancing Shiva, as Nataraja, in the Mallikarjuna temple is set in the shallow arch of the sukanasa. As another example, the topmost storey of the shikara superstructure of this temple lacks hara elements (threads), while its roof is hemispherical, unlike the square roof of the Virupaksha temple.

The use of stone carvings for storytelling is prevalent throughout the temple. The legends of Hindu epics and the Puranas are depicted on the temple pillars in the community hall. These stories span all major traditions within Hinduism, including Shaivism, Vaishnavism, and Shaktism. The rasa lila of Krishna, whose stories are found in the Bhagavata Purana, are shown on friezes as are Hindu fables from the Panchatantra. Like other Hindu temples, the friezes of the Mallikarjuna temple show kama and mithuna scenes of amorous couples. In other places, artha scenes such as a worker walking with an elephant carrying a log and single women with different emotional expressions are carved into stone; one of these women carries an 8th-century musical instrument.

=== Virupaksha Temple ===
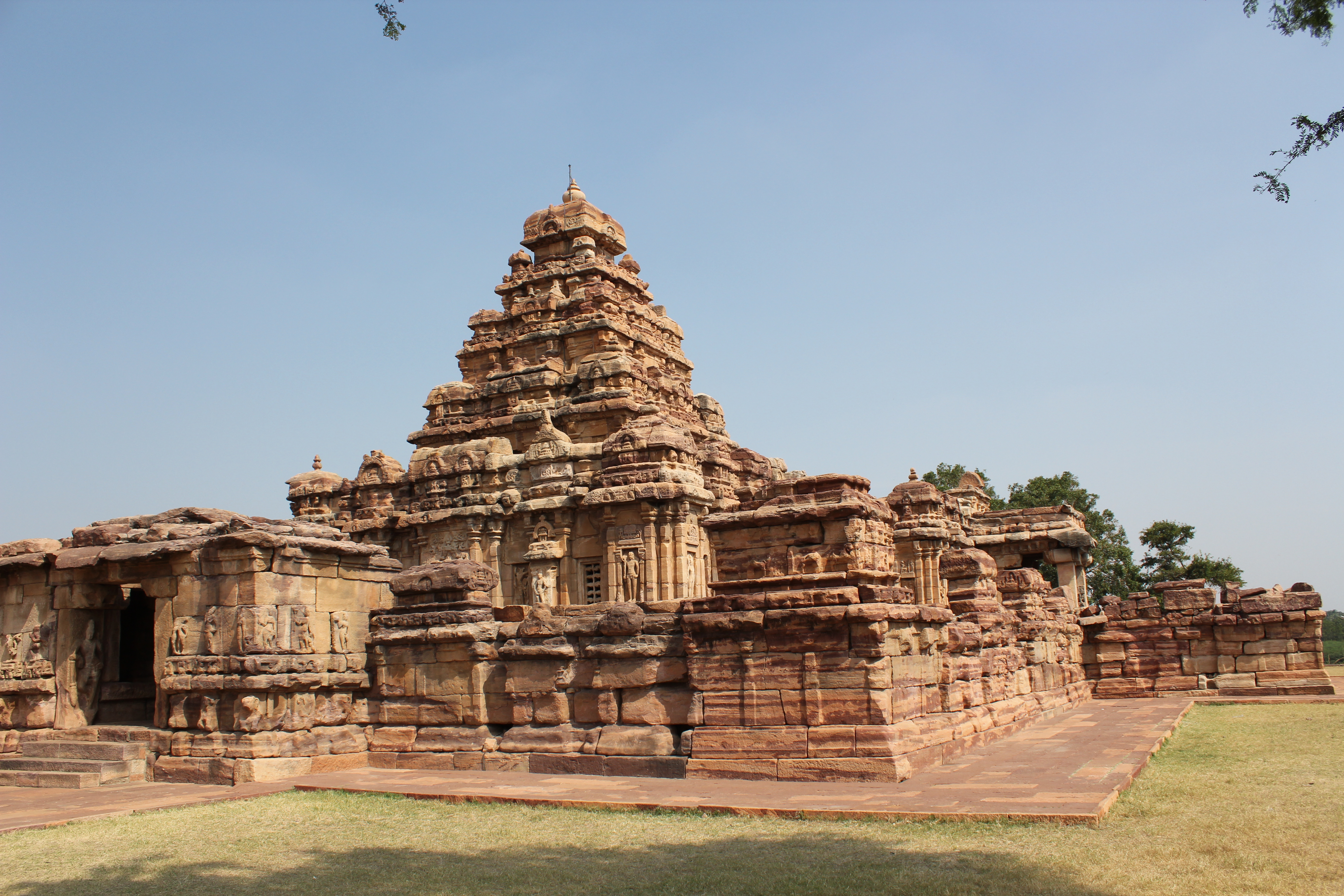
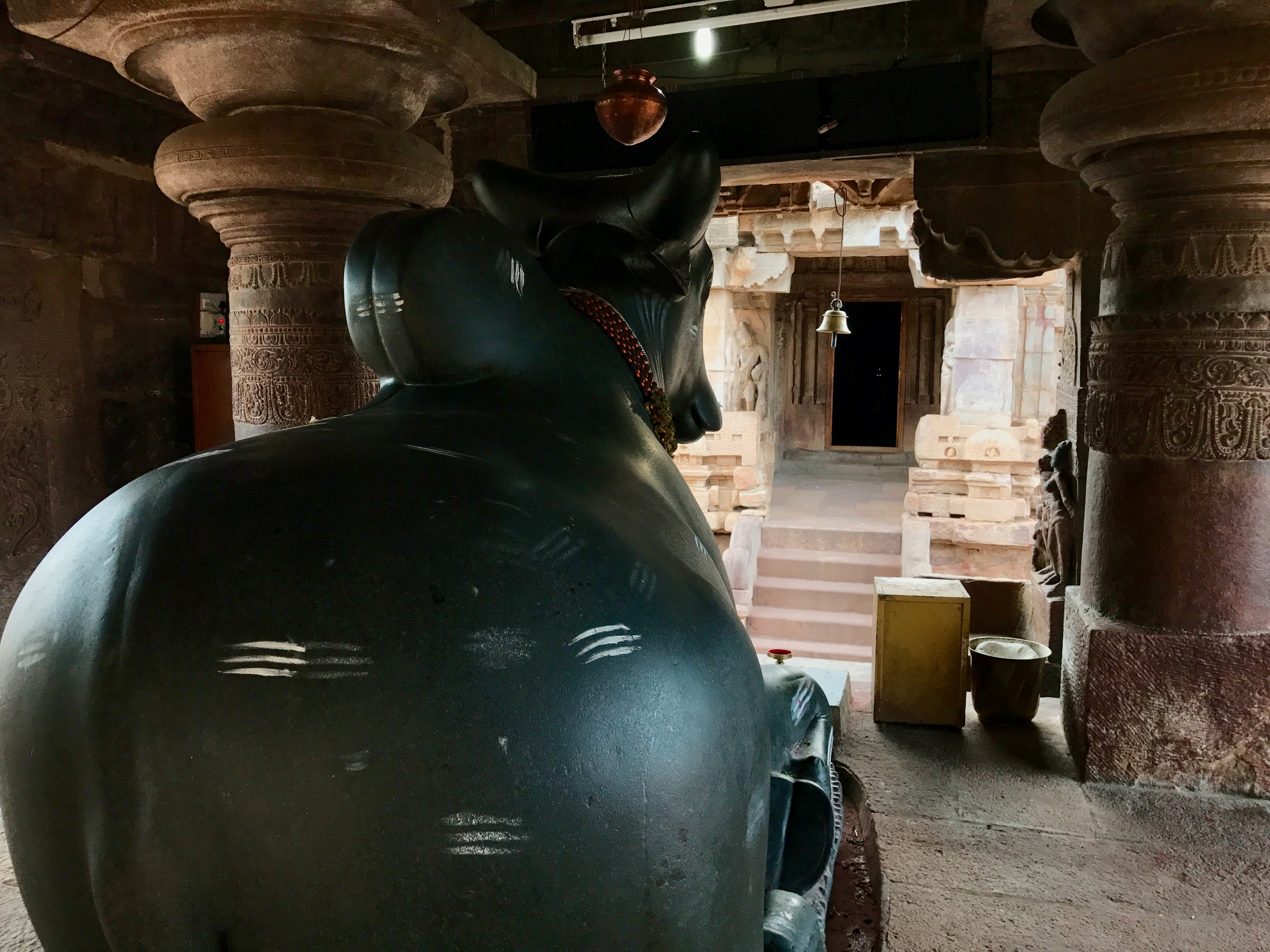
Left: Virupaksha Temple from southwest corner; Right: A Nandi shrine (active temple).

The Virupaksha temple, located to the immediate south of the Mallikarjuna temple, is the largest and most sophisticated of the monuments at Pattadakal. In inscriptions, it is referred to as "Shri Lokeshvara Mahasila Prasada", after its sponsor Queen Lokmahadevi, and is dated to about 740 CE. It was constructed after the successful military campaigns of King Vikramaditya II against the Pallavas (4th-9th centuries CE) and the inscription mentions grant to the "musicians of the temple" by the Queen and also disclosing the identity of the chief architect "Gunda Anivaritacharya" to the architect and by giving him honour of perijereppu patta by king Vikramaditya-II. The temple is notable for its range, and quality, of construction exemplifying a well developed Dravidian architectural style, as well as the inscribed names of the artists beneath the panels they worked on.

As is common with other temples at Pattadakal, the Virupaksha temple was built facing east, centred around a square garbha griha (sanctum), with a Shiva Linga, surrounded by a covered circumabulatory path (pradakshina patha). In front of the sanctum is an antarala with two small shrines within which are facing images of Ganesha and Parvati, in her Durga aspect as Mahishasuramardini killing the buffalo demon. The external Nandi pavilion is aligned on an east–west axis, as are the mantapa and antechamber. The temple site forms a rectangle consisting of fused squares bounded by walls, which are decorated with carvings. Within the compound are smaller shrines, of which there were once 32, based on the foundation footprint layout, but most have since been lost. The entrance leads to a mantapa with 18 columns (4-5-aisle-5-4, with a 4x4 set forming the inner mantapa and two leading to the darshana space).

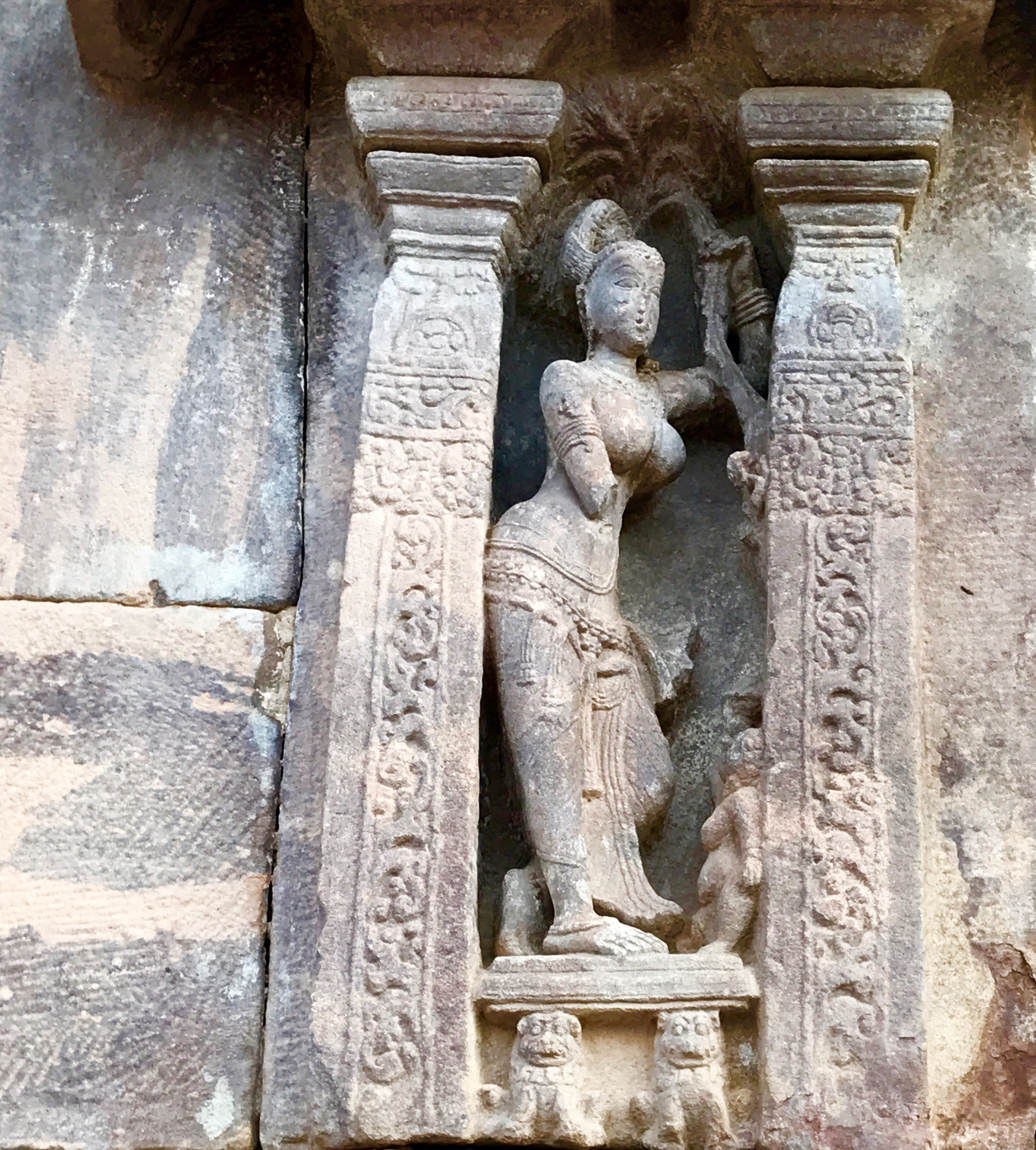
A relief at Virupaksha temple

The tower above the sanctum is a three-storey pyramidal structure, with each storey bearing motifs that reflect those in the sanctum below. However, for clarity of composition, the artisans had simplified the themes in the pilastered projections and intricate carvings. The third storey is the simplest, having only parapet kutas, a kuta roof with each face decorated with kudus – a structure common in later Dravidian architecture Hindu temples. A kalasha-like pot, found in festivals, social ceremonies and personal rituals such as weddings, crowns the temple. The top of this pot is 17.5 metres (57 ft) above the temple pavement, the highest for any pre-9th century South Indian temple. The sukanasa on the tower is large, exceeding half the height of the superstructure, to aid visibility from a distance.

The sanctum walls, and also those of the nearby mantapa space, are decorated with intricately detailed carvings. These carvings depict images of Shaivism, Vaishnavism, and Shaktism deities, and themes, such as Narasimha and Varaha (Vaishaivism), Bhairava and Nataraja (Shaivism), Harihara (half Shiva-half Vishnu), Lakulisa (Shaivism), Brahma, Durga, Saraswati, Lakshmi, and others. According to George Michell, the carvings on the walls and porch of the Virupaksha temple exterior are "vehicles for diverse sculptural compositions, by far the most numerous found on any Early Chalukya monument". Other than Hindu gods and goddesses, numerous panels depict people either as couples, in courtship and mithuna, or as individuals wearing jewelry or carrying work implements.

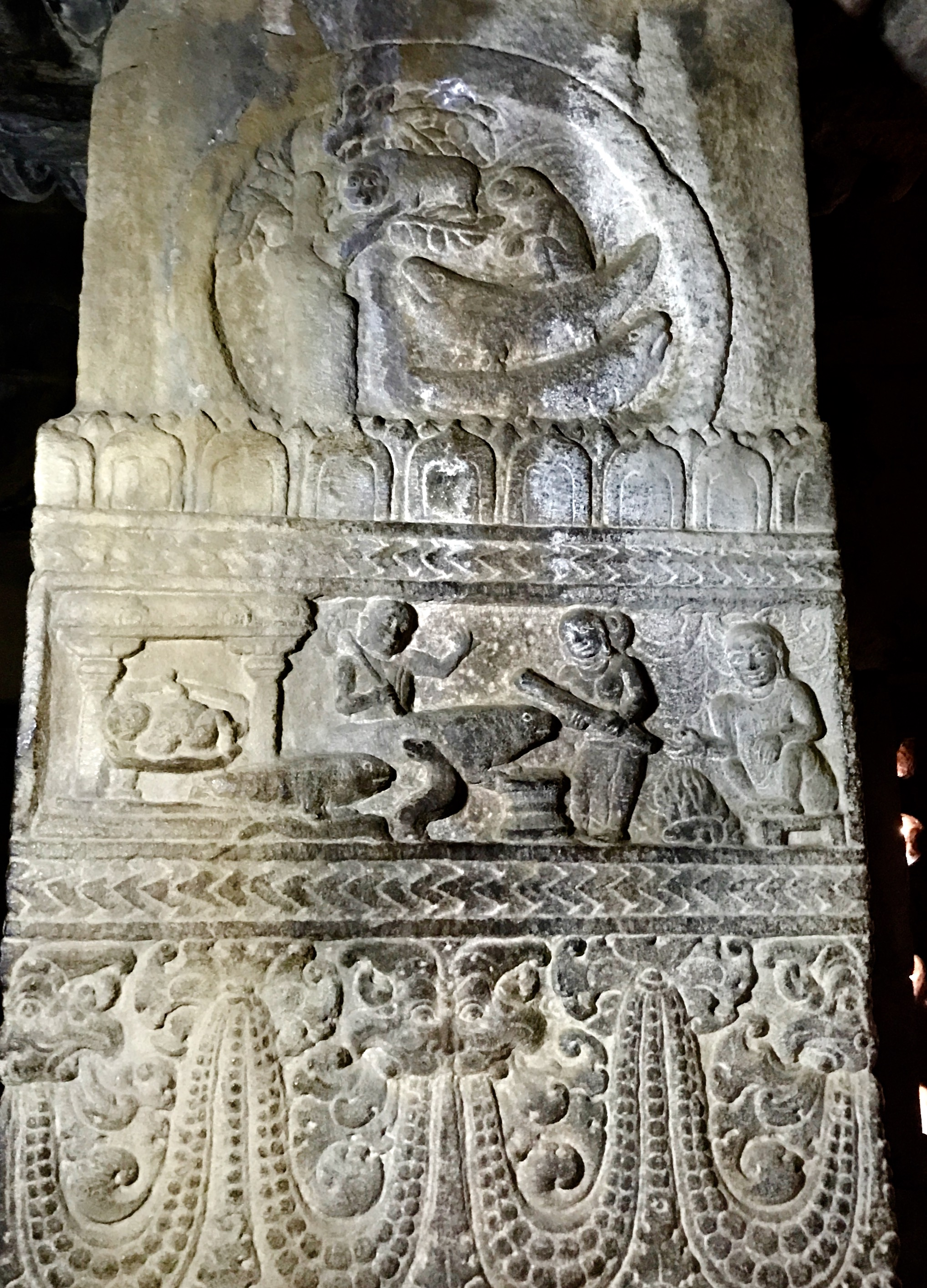
A Virupaksha frieze showing two Panchatantra fables.

The temple has numerous friezes spanning a variety of topics such as, for example, two men wrestling, a rishi with Vishnu, a rishi with Shiva, Vishnu rescuing the Gajendra elephant trapped by a crocodile in a lotus pond, scenes of hermitages, and sadhus seated in meditative yoga posture. Vedic deities such as Surya riding the chariot with Aruna, Indra on an elephant, and others are carved in stone. A few depict scenes from the Ramayana such as those involving Angada (Vali's Son from Kishkindha Kingdom)sitting on a high chair made of his own magic tail and higher than the height of the ravana's throne, golden deer, Hanuman, Sugriva, Vali, Ravana and Jatayu bird, Sita being abducted, the struggles of Rama and Lakshmana. Other friezes show scenes from the Mahabharata, Vasudeva jailed by Kamsa and the birth of Sr Krishna, Krishna's playful life story in the Bhagavata Purana and the Harivamsa as well as fables from the Panchatantra and other Hindu texts.

The temple contains historically significant inscriptions that provide hints about the society and culture of 8th-century India. For example, one inscription mentions a grant to the "musicians of the temple" by the queen.

The famous Kailasha temple at Ellora Caves was modeled after this temple. However, the Virupaksha temple was itself modeled after the Kailasanatha temple at Kanchipuram.

=== Papanatha temple ===
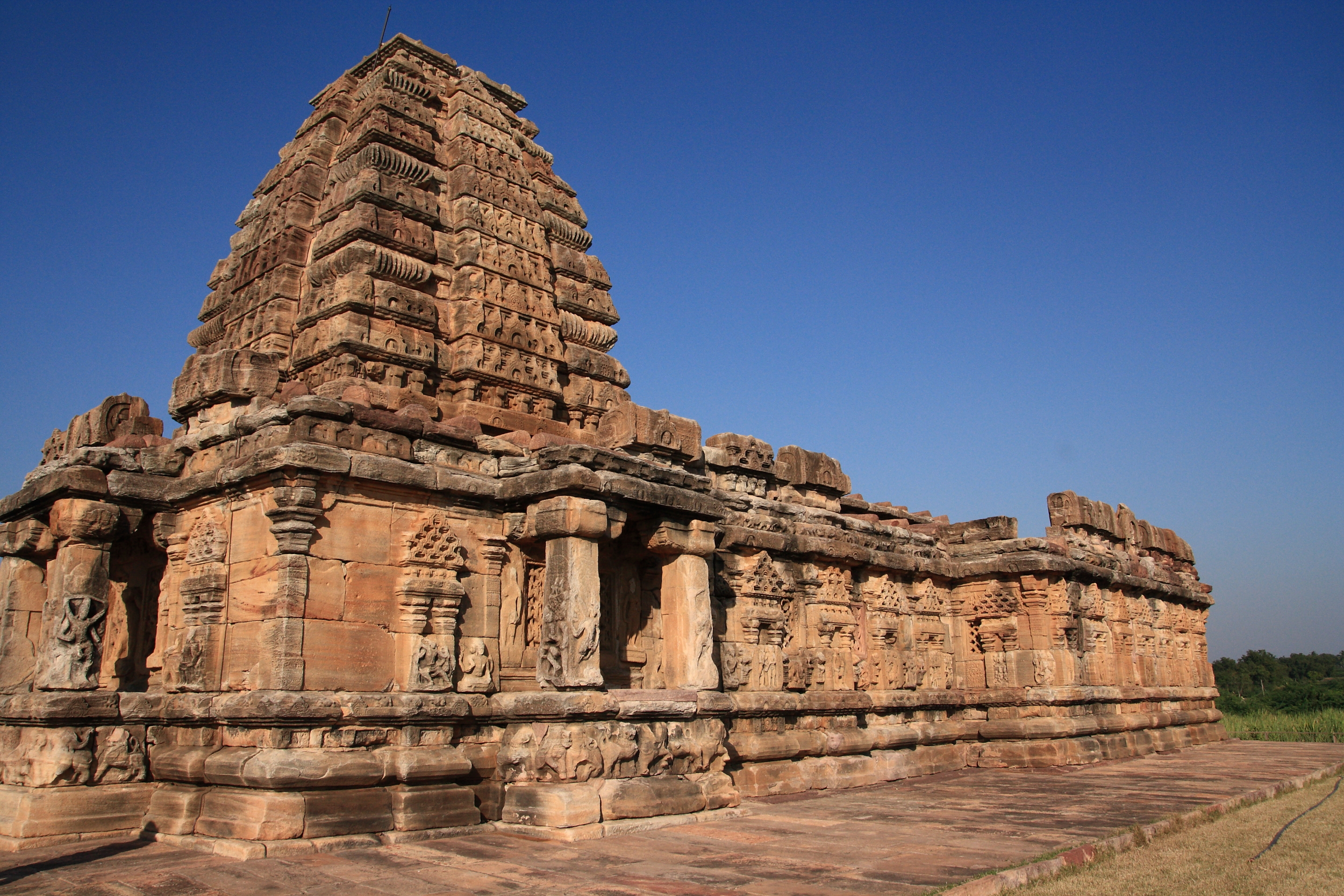
Papanatha temple

The Papanatha temple is situated apart from the main cluster of eight monuments. It is about half a kilometer to the south of Virupaksha and has been dated towards the end of the Early Chalukya rule period, approximately mid-8th century. The temple is noted for its novel mixture of Dravida and Nagara Hindu temple styles.

The unusual layout of the temple is possibly due to its construction, which occurred in three stages, but there is a lack of epigraphical evidence to support this hypothesis. Its architectural and sculptural details do show a consistent and unified theme, indicative of a plan. The temple is longer, incorporating two interconnected mantapas, one with 16 pillars and another with 4 pillars. The decorations, parapets, and some parts of the layout are Dravida in style, while the tower and pilastered niches are of the Nagara style.

Like the other temples, the Papanatha temple faces east towards the sunrise and has a Shiva linga in its garbha griya (sanctum), except that there is no Nandi-mandapa. Instead, there is an image of Nandi housed in the sabha mantapa facing the sanctum. The temple walls are notable for the carved deities and themes of Shaivism and Vaishnavism; Durga is depicted in one of the niches. Intricately carved panels are displayed on the walls, depicting legends such as the Ramayana and excerpts of the Kiratarjuniya.

The centre of the ceiling is decorated with an elaborate Shiva Nataraja, while other ceiling slabs show Vishnu; one panel shows him in a reclining Anantasayana pose. Outside, in the mandapas, are images of single women and couples, in courtship and different stages of mithuna. Many panels show musicians with different types of musical instruments.

=== Jain Narayana Temple ===
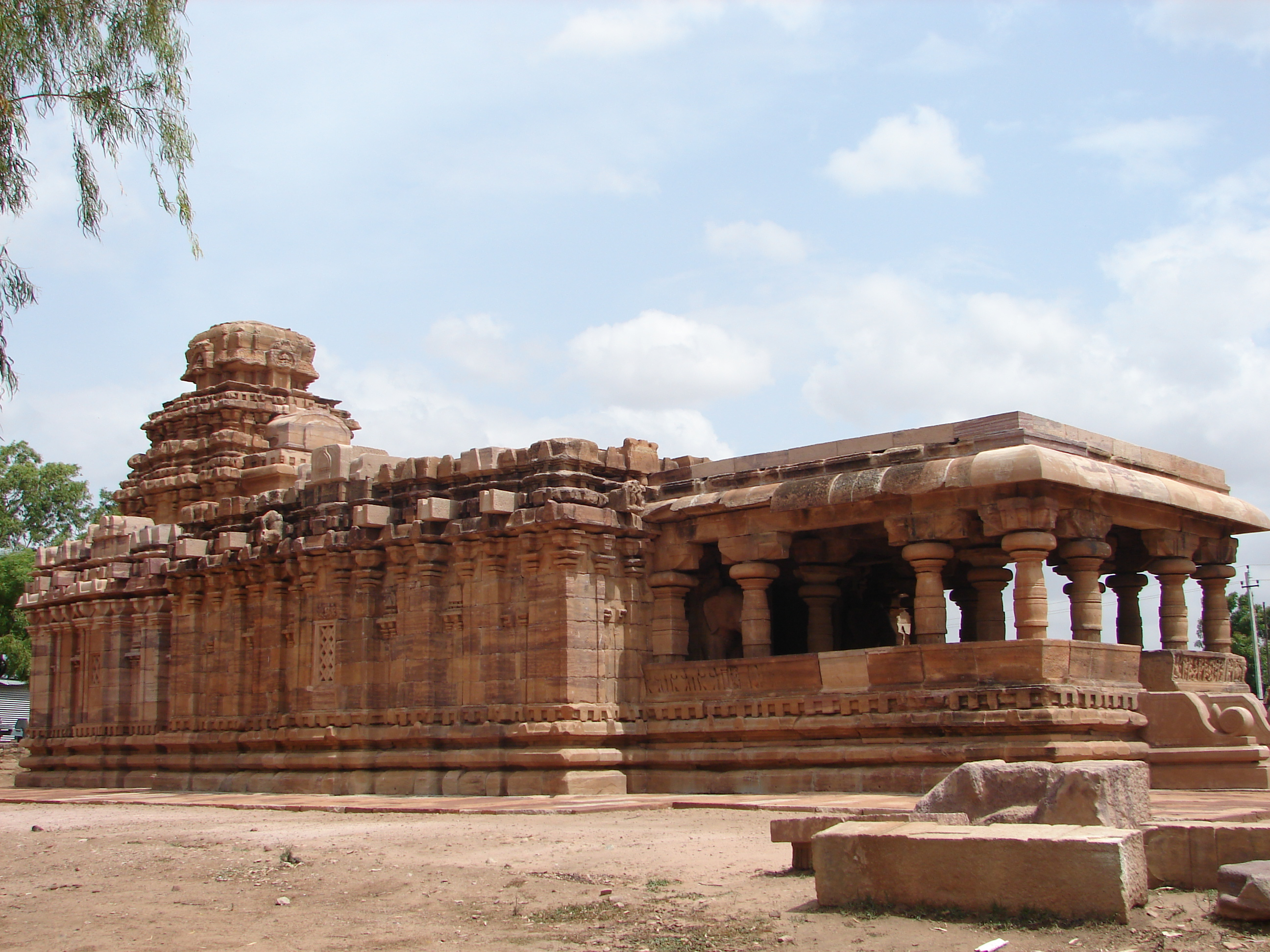
Jain Narayana temple

The Jaina temple at Pattadakal was built during the 9th century, possibly with sponsorship from the Rashtrakuta King Krishna II or the Kalyani Chalukyas. Unlike the other nine temples, the Narayana temple lacks Hindu deities and intricate panels like the other nine. Instead, it has a statue of a Jina carved into the north side kapota eave.

Like the Hindu temples, this temple also features a square sanctum, a circumambulatory path, an antechamber, a mantapa and a porch. The mantapa is divided into seven bays at the north and south walls, with narrow niches containing seated Jinas. The bays are in the North Indian style, and the tower storey has a carved square shikhara.

The mantapa has a row of lathe-turned sandstone pillars. The kakshasana are decorated with the figures of dancers, purna-ghata, nidhis, and vyalas, but some of the artwork is only partially finished. The entrance features carvings of a life-sized elephant torso with riders. According to Adam Hardy, the niches of this Jain temple mantapa may have previously featured images.

The Archaeological Survey of India has conducted excavations at the site yielding evidence of an older temple and Jaina presence. According to the ASI, the excavations uncovered "the remains of a large temple complex built in bricks and also a beautiful sculpture of Tirthankara standing in sama-bhanga indicating the existence of a temple, probably belonging to before or beginning of the early Chalukyan rule".

=== Other monuments and inscriptions ===
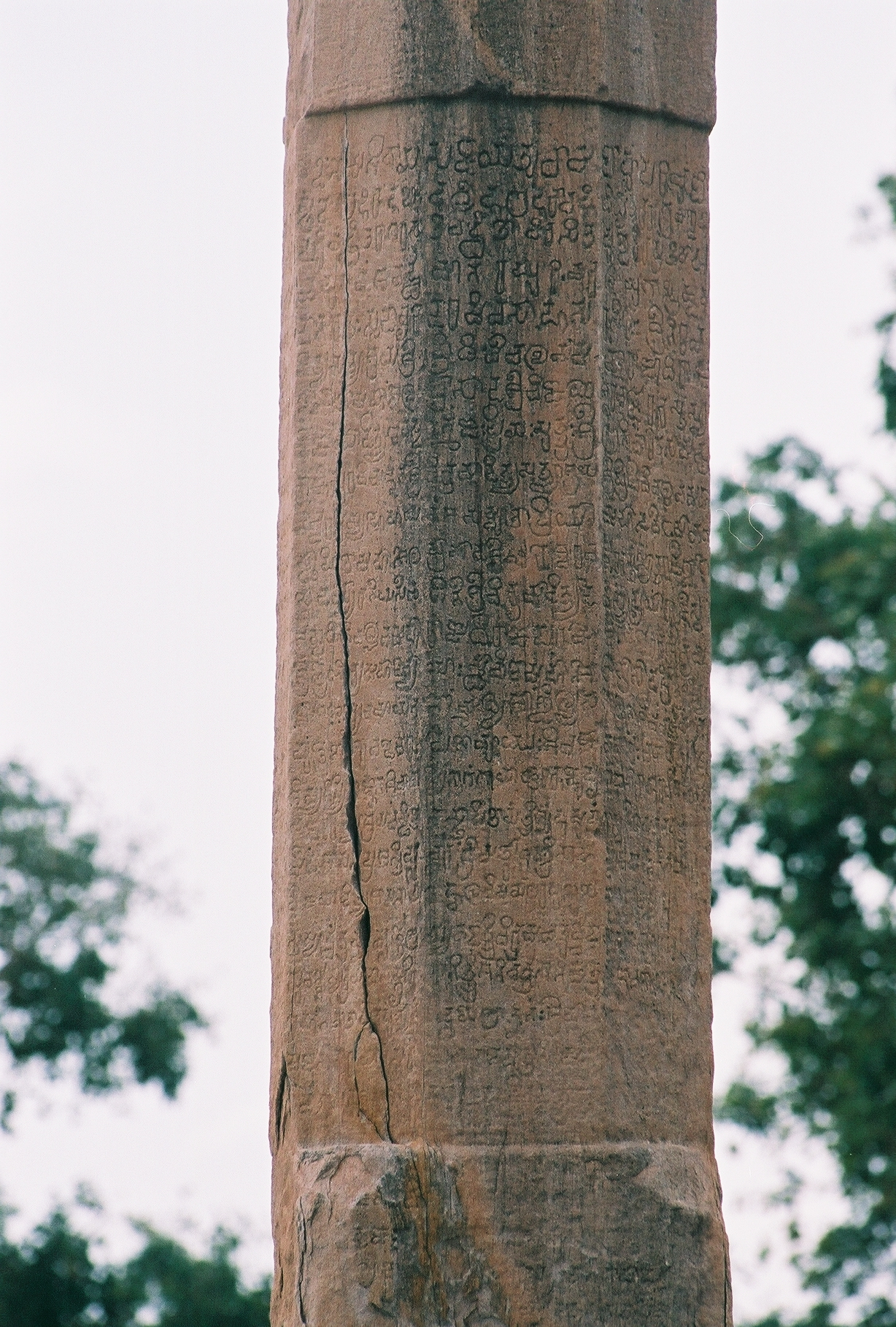
Old Kannada inscription of Chalukya emperor Vikramaditya II on victory pillar, Virupaksha Temple, Pattadakal, c.733–745.

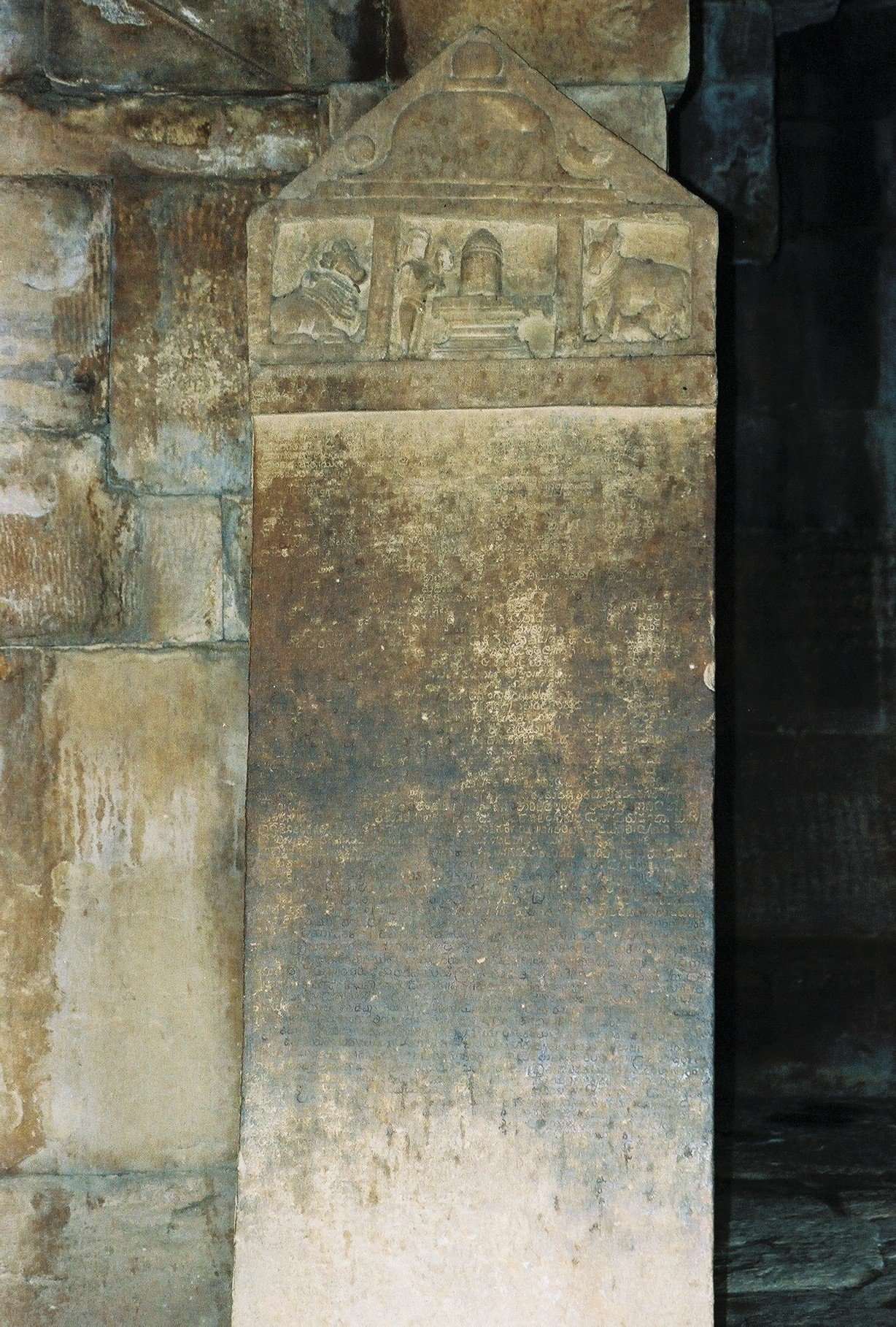
Old Kannada inscription describes the grant made for Sangameshwara temple by Chalukya King Vijayaditya c.1162

A number of inscriptions in the old Kannada language have been found at Pattadakal, notably in the Virupaksha, Sangameshwara and Papanatha temples. These inscriptions are an important source of information regarding the grants made by King Vikramaditya and Vijayaditya, various queens, and others, for the construction and operation of the temple. They have also provided valuable insight into the evolution of various written Indian scripts. As an example, one particular 8th-century column is inscribed in two Sanskrit scripts, the northern Indian Siddhamatrika script (Note: The script is also called "early Nagari", "Kutila", "Vikata" and "acute angled"; it is referred to as Siddham script in East Asian Buddhist texts.) and the southern Indian Kannada script.

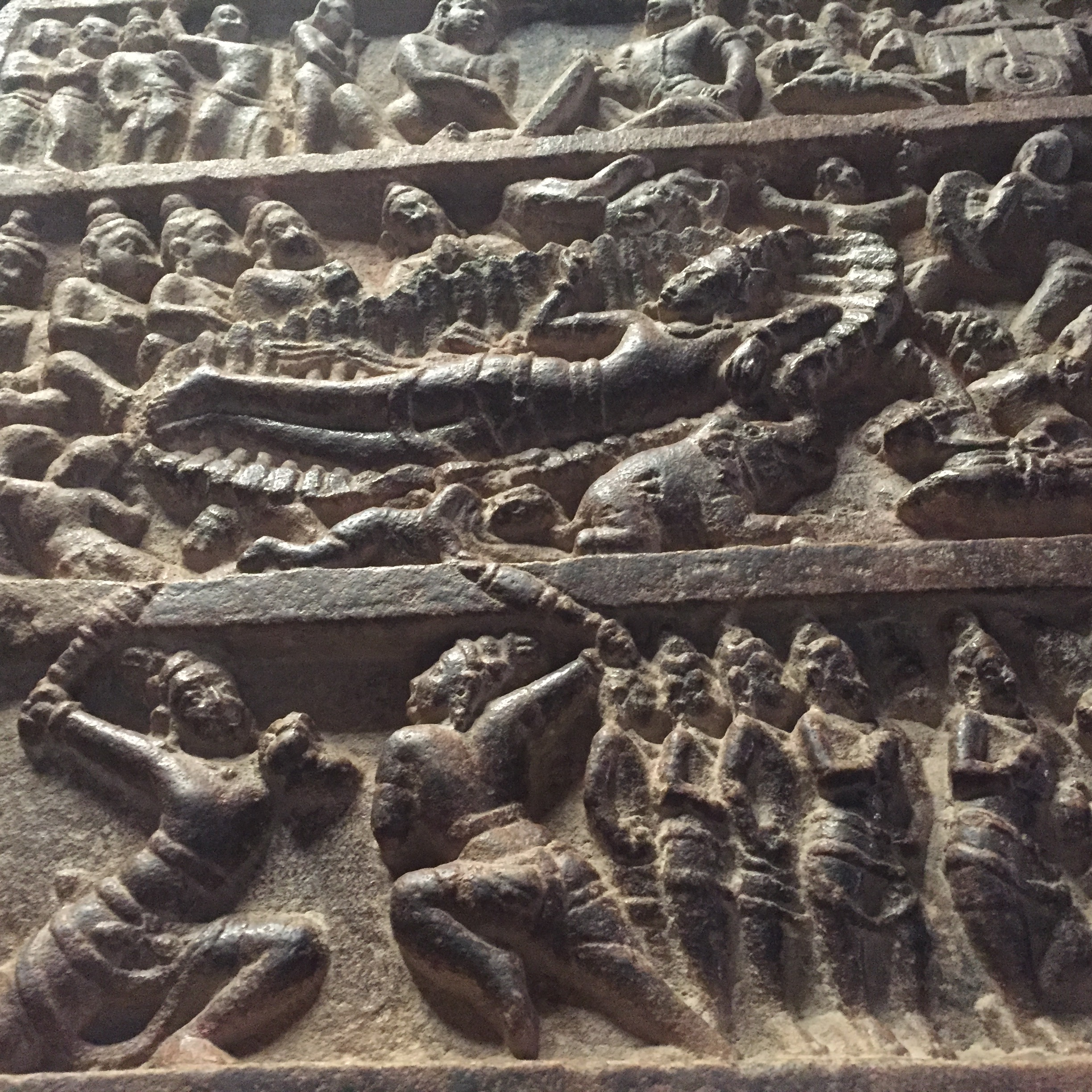
Mahabharata frieze

Other notable monuments at Pattadakal include a monolithic stone pillar bearing numerous inscriptions, the Naganatha temple, the Mahakuteshwara temple, which also bears numerous inscriptions, as well as several small shrines dedicated to Shiva. Near the Virupaksha, Sangameshwara and Mallikarjuna temples is a Shaiva stone pillar, featuring a trident emblem. The pillar bears inscriptions stating Jnana Shivacharya erected it from Mrigathanikahara, located on the north bank of the Ganges, and that he had gifted a parcel of land to Vijayeshwara.

In 2008, Upinder Singh wrote that S. Venkateshaiah, a senior archaeologist with the ASI, had located the quarry where the stones were sourced some 5 kilometers away from Pattadakal. The site is notable for sketches of Shiva, Nandi, Durga, Ganesh, trident, peacock, swastika, symbols and inscriptions. Some of these may be emblems of guilds (sanghata) that quarried and supplied the stones for temples.

== Significance ==
According to art historian Cathleen Cummings, the monuments at Pattadakal are a historically significant example of religion, society, and culture, particularly Hindu and Jain, in the Deccan region, and are an expression of Hindu kingship and the religious worldview of 8th-century India. She writes that the artisans express the conflicting concepts of Dharma (duty, virtue, righteousness) and Moksha (liberation) in Hindu theology, particularly Pashupata Shaivism. Furthermore, she states that the significance lies not just within individual images but also in their relative location and sequence, as well as how they express the historic tension in Hindu religious tradition between the stately life of the householder and the life of the renouncing monk.

The expression of Dharma, particularly raja-dharma (royal authority and duty) as exemplified by Rama, and Moksha are seen throughout the various temples at Pattadakal. The former is depicted in various friezes using examples of the life story of Rama from the Ramayan. At the same time, the latter is expressed with images of Lakulisha, Nataraja, Yoga, and numerous ascetics. Other imagery that is particularly prevalent at Pattadakal is that between Purusha and Prakriti, the soul and the matter, the masculine, and the feminine.

The temples at Pattadakal are symbolic of the Chalukya inclination towards integration and experimentation, resulting in a merging of the Northern and Southern Indian architectural styles. This is particularly evident when the architecture at Pattadakal, Aihole and Badami are viewed together. Aihole, in the 5th century, served as the incubator for the concepts that would lead to this integration of styles. These concepts were further refined in Badami during the 6th and 7th centuries. The culmination of this is, as described by UNESCO, "the apogee of an eclectic art which, in the 7th and 8th centuries, achieved a harmonious blend of architectural forms from the north and south of India".

=== Early medieval era music and arts ===
Among the sculptures at Pattadakal is one of a long-necked lute (Sitar-like) dated to the 10th century. The site also shows friezes with more conventional musical instruments, but the long-necked lute suggests there was a tradition of musicians innovating with new instrument designs. Another example are the 7th-century stick zithers found carved in the bas-relief at Mahabalipuram in Tamil Nadu.

== See also ==
- Aihole
- Alampur group of temples, Telangana
- Badami cave temples
- Ellora Caves
- Gajendragad
- Lakkundi
- List of State Protected Monuments in Karnataka
- Mahadeva Temple (Itagi)
- Mahakuta group of temples
- Sirpur Group of Monuments
- Sudi
