= National Highway 748AA (India) =

National Highway in India

National Highway 748AA
- Map of National Highway 748AA in red

Route information
- Auxiliary route of NH 48
- Length: 82 km (51 mi)

Major junctions
- East end: Machhe
- West end: Sanquelim

Location
- Country: India
- States: Karnataka, Goa

Highway system
- Roads in India; Expressways; National; State; Asian
← NH 748	→ NH 748AA

National Highway 748AA, commonly referred to as NH 748AA is a national highway in India. It is a spur road of National Highway 48. NH-748AA traverses the states of Karnataka and Goa in India.

== Route ==
Karnataka

Machhe, Piranvadi, Navage, Kinaye, Bailur, Kusamalli, Jamboti, Kalmani, Kankumbi - Goa border.

Goa

Karnataka border - Poriem, Matnee, Sanquelim.

== Junctions ==
State	Location	km	Junction	Destinations	Notes
Karnataka	Machhe	0	—	NH 748	Terminal near Machhe.
1.000 mi = 1.609 km; 1.000 km = 0.621 mi

== See also ==
- List of national highways in India
- List of national highways in India by state
