= Talawade, Vikramgad =

Village in Maharashtra

Talawade
- village
- Location in Maharashtra, India Talawade (India)
- Coordinates: 19.9062515°N 73.0080576°E
- Country: India
- State: Maharashtra
- District: Palghar
- Taluka: Vikramgad
- Elevation: 72 m (236 ft)

Population (2011)
  - Total: 3,582
- Time zone: UTC+5:30 (IST)
- 2011 census code: 551757

Talawade is a village in the Palghar district of Maharashtra, India. It is located in the Vikramgad taluka.

== Demographics ==
According to the 2011 census of India, Talawade has 641 households. The effective literacy rate (i.e. the literacy rate of population excluding children aged 6 and below) is 64.54%.

Demographics (2011 Census)
| | Total | Male | Female |
|---|---|---|---|
| Population | 3582 | 1820 | 1762 |
| Children aged below 6 years | 500 | 264 | 236 |
| Scheduled caste | 1 | 1 | 0 |
| Scheduled tribe | 3411 | 1735 | 1676 |
| Literates | 1989 | 1142 | 847 |
| Workers (all) | 1775 | 896 | 879 |
| Main workers (total) | 813 | 429 | 384 |
| Main workers: Cultivators | 226 | 103 | 123 |
| Main workers: Agricultural labourers | 445 | 227 | 218 |
| Main workers: Household industry workers | 4 | 4 | 0 |
| Main workers: Other | 138 | 95 | 43 |
| Marginal workers (total) | 962 | 467 | 495 |
| Marginal workers: Cultivators | 354 | 169 | 185 |
| Marginal workers: Agricultural labourers | 555 | 272 | 283 |
| Marginal workers: Household industry workers | 3 | 1 | 2 |
| Marginal workers: Others | 50 | 25 | 25 |
| Non-workers | 1807 | 924 | 883 |
