= Jamboti =

Jamboti Zambotim
- Village
- Location in Karnataka, India Jamboti (India)
- Coordinates: 15°41′35″N 74°21′57.4″E
- Country: India
- State: Karnataka
- District: Belagavi
- Talukas: Khanapur

Government
  - Body: Gram panchayat

Area
  - Total: 13.81 km^{2} (5.33 sq mi)
- Elevation: 850 m (2,790 ft)

Population (2011)
  - Total: 2,482
  - Density: 179.7/km^{2} (465.5/sq mi)

Languages
  - Official: Kannada
- Time zone: UTC+5:30 (IST)
- PIN: 591345
- ISO 3166 code: IN-KA
- Vehicle registration: KA-22
- Nearest city: Khanapur
- Climate: Cool Temperate climate (Köppen)
- Website: karnataka.gov.in

Jamboti (Konkani: Zambotim) is an area located 28 kilometres (17 mi) south-west of Belgaum and 18 kilometres (11 mi) west of Khanapur in the Belgaum District of Karnataka, India.

Mandovi River, the longest river in Goa, has its origin in the Jamboti hills. Most of the area is agricultural land, and agriculture is the main source of employment. Parwad and Kankumbhi are the hill stations, with hilltop forests surrounding the area. As per census 2011, the location code number of Jamboti village is 597826.

== Transport ==
Belagavi Airport is 39 km north-east from Jamboti. Khanapur Railway Station is the nearest railhead. NH-748AA and State Highway 31 passes through Jamboti.

== Rainfall ==
Jamboti is the highest rainfall receiving station in the Belagavi district. In 2024, it received 3,825.7 millimetres (150.62 in) of annual rainfall, with 106% of excess downpour. In 2025, Jamboti hobli received 3,632.7 millimetres (143.02 in) of annual rainfall.
