= Malaprabha River =

River in Karnataka, India

Location
- Country: India
- State: Karnataka
- Region: Belgaum

Physical characteristics
- Source
  - location: Kanakumbi, Belagavi District
  - elevation: 792.4 m (2,600 ft)
- Mouth
  - location: Krishna River, Kudalasangama

The Malaprabha River is a tributary of the Krishna River and flows through the state of Karnataka in India. It rises in the Western Ghats at an elevation of 792.4 m (2,600 ft) in the state's Belagavi district. The Malaprabha joins Krishna River at Kudalasangama in Bagalkot district.

== Geography ==
Malaprabha River originates in the Sahyadri mountains at an elevation of 792.4 metres (2,600 ft) at Kanakumbi village 16 km (9.9 mi) west of Jamboti village, Khanapur taluka, Belgaum District, Karnataka. At the origin of the Malaprabha an ancient temple has been constructed dedicated to Shree Mauli Devi. The temple is in R.S. No. 127 of Kankumbi village. Malaprabha birthplace is a pilgrimage site with mythological origins.

A hand‑carved symbol in the rock near the source of the Malaprabha River represents the river’s origin and reflects the belief that its waters provide protection and well‑being for humankind. The source has highly stable mineral water. The presence of discontinuities has major influence on properties of contours at source of river. Permeability is dependent on orientation of the region.

Malaprabha flows for 304 km (189 mi) from Kanakumbi-Khanapur-Soundatti-(Malaprabha Dam)-Ramdurg-Nargund-Pattadkal-Kudalasangam before joining river Krishna at an elevation of 488 metres (1,601 ft) at Kudala Sangama in Bagalkot district.

== Tributaries ==
Bennihalla, Hirehalla and Tuparihalla are the major tributaries to the Malaprabha of Dharwad district.

== Reservoir ==
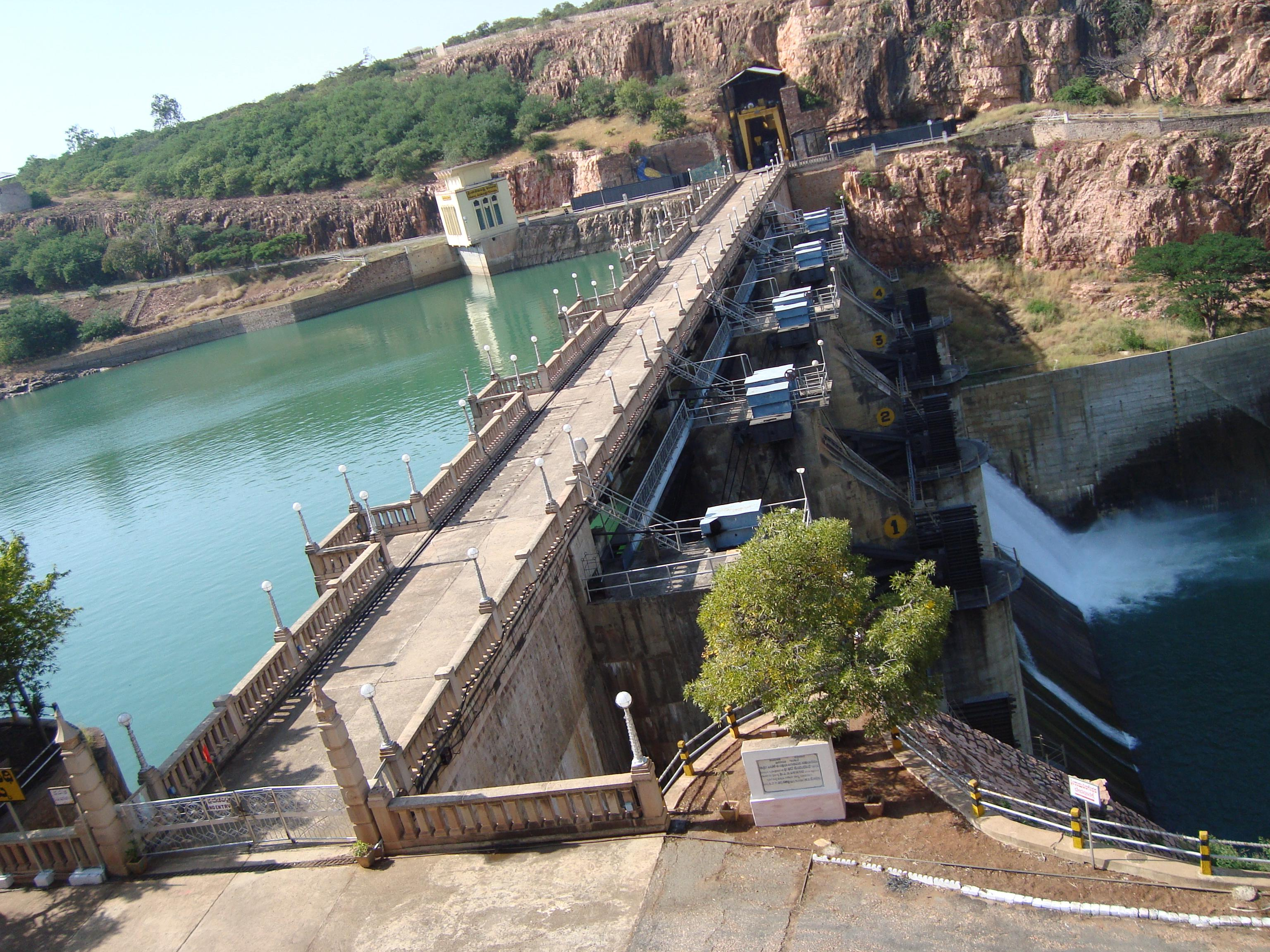
Navilateertha Dam, near Saundatti, Belgaum District, North Karnataka

Navilatirtha Dam (Navilu in Kannada means peacock) is between Saundatti and Munavalli in Belgaum District. The reservoir created by the dam is called Renukasagara. Its catchment area is 11,549 km^{3} (2,771 cu mi). This reservoir irrigates more than 2,000 km^{2} (770 sq mi) of agricultural land.

=== Pilgrimage centre ===
There is an ancient temple of the deity Yellamma on a nearby hill. This is a pilgrimage centre for thousands of devotees. Also the temples of Aihole, Pattadakal and Badami are on the banks of the Malaprabha. These are listed as World Heritage Sites by UNESCO.

== See also ==
- The Kalasa-Banduri Nala project
- Mahakuta
