= Kankumbi =

Coordinates: 15°42′N 74°13′E

Kankumbi is a village in Belgaum district of Karnataka, India, near the north-eastern part of the Goa-Karnataka border. It is situated in the cradle of the Western Ghats, lying to the east of Valpoy, Goa. Konkani and Marathi languages are spoken here.

== History ==
There are a few Chardo families in this area as they had migrated due to the persecution of the Portuguese in Goa. Shree Mauli Devi Temple is situated in R.S. No 127 of village of Kankumbi and it is known as a pilgrimage center from the times of mythological origins. The Malaprabha river flows past Kanakumbi village. The town has more than 5,000 people. There are five hotels, including Malaprabha Megharaj.

The big festivals celebrated in the village are Shigmo, Divali, Chavathi, and other Hindu festivals.
