= Chapoli =

- Village
- Location in Karnataka, India Chapoli (India)
- Coordinates: 15°39′20″N 74°20′15″E
- Country: India
- State: Karnataka
- District: Belgaum
- Talukas: Khanapur

Population (2001)
  - Total: 600

Languages Marathi, Konkani, Kannada
  - Official: Kannada
- Time zone: UTC+5:30 (IST)

Chapoli is a village in Belgaum district in the southern state of Karnataka, India. It is located amid the thick and dense Western Ghats forest which provides habitat for leopards, bears and other wild animals.
