= Talawade, Belgaum =

Talawade
- Village
- Country: India
- State: Karnataka
- District: Belgaum
- Talukas: Khanapur

Languages
  - Official: Kannada
- Time zone: UTC+5:30 (IST)

Talawade is a village in Belgaum district of Karnataka, India. The Mandovi River (also called the Mahadayi River) is fed by streams near the village.
