= Kedareshvara Temple, Balligavi =

Kedareshvara Temple
- Hindu temple
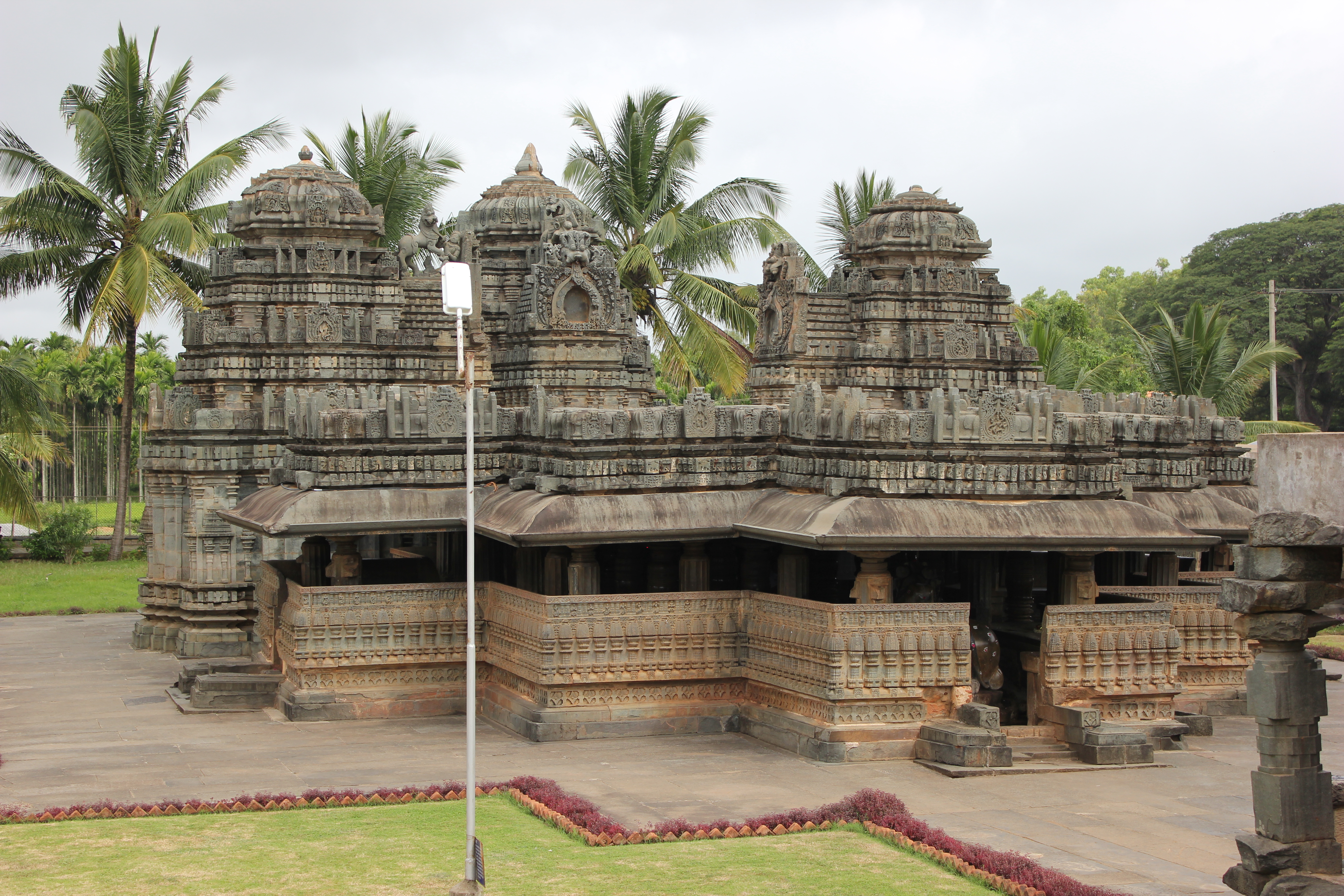
- Kedareshvara temple (1070) at Balligavi in Shimoga district
- Interactive map of Kedareshvara Temple
- Country: India
- State: Karnataka
- District: Shimoga District

Languages
  - Official: Kannada
- Time zone: UTC+5:30 (IST)

The Kedareshvara temple (also spelt Kedareshwara or Kedaresvara) is located in the town of Balligavi (known variously in ancient inscriptions as Belagami, Belligave, Ballagamve and Ballipura), near Shikaripura in the Shimoga district of Karnataka state, India. Dotted with centres of learning (agrahara), Balligavi was an important city during the 11th - 12th century Western Chalukya rule. The term Anadi Rajadhani (ancient capital) used in medieval inscriptions to describe this town tells a tale of great antiquity. Art historian Adam Hardy classifies the style involved in the construction of the temple as "Later Chalukya, non mainstream, relatively close to mainstream". He dates the temple to late 11th century, with inscriptional evidence of additions made up to 1131, by the Hoysalas during their control over the region. The building material used is soapstone. The Archaeological Survey of India classifies the style of architecture as distinctly Hoysala. The Hoysala ruling family was during this period a powerful feudatory of the imperial Western Chalukya Empire, gaining the trappings of independence only from the period of King Vishnuvardhana (1108-1152 A.D). The temple is protected as a monument of national importance by the Archaeological Survey of India.

== Deity ==
The cella (garbhagriha) in the shrines to the west and south contain the Shivalinga (the universal symbol of the Hindu god Shiva) and the cella to the north has an image of the god Vishnu. The temple is connected with the legend of demon Bali according to some lithic records. In its heyday, the temple attracted a large number of followers of the Kalamukha sect of Shaivism. A four faced image of the god Brahma, which at one time may have been inside the temple, is on display in a museum within the temple complex.

== Temple plan ==
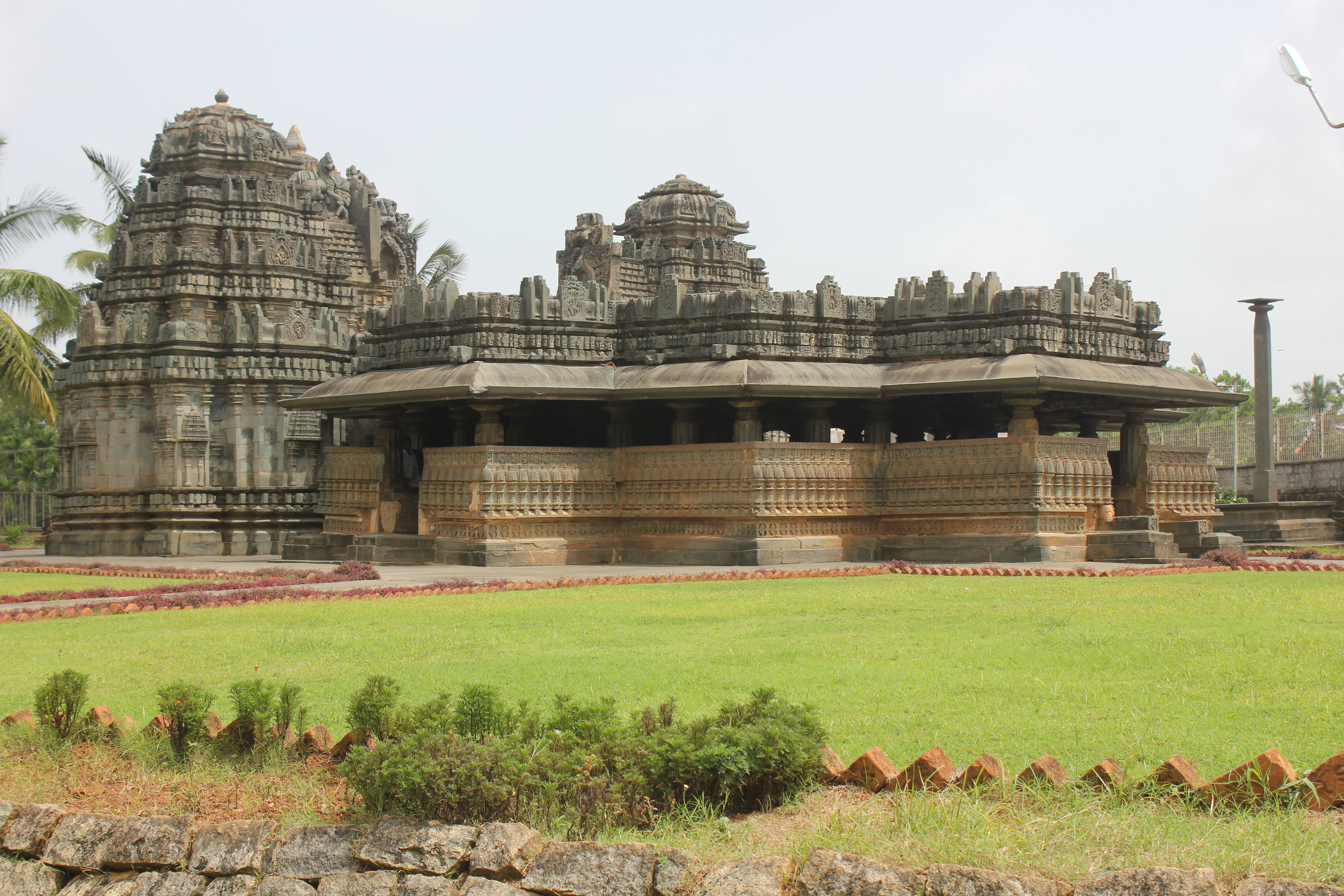
Profile of Kedareshvara temple at Balligavi

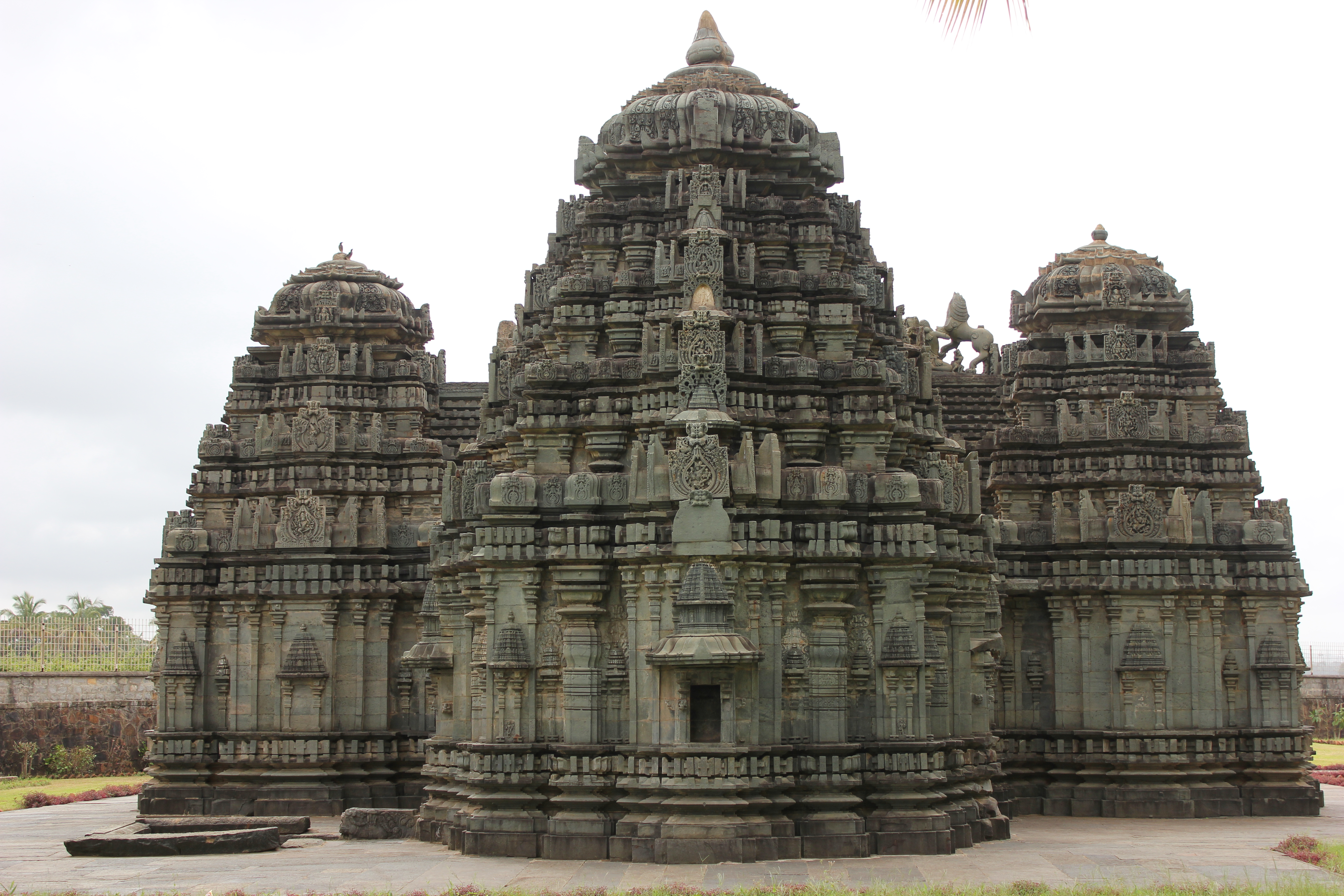
Rear view of trikuta (three shrines with three towers) in Kedareshvara temple at Balligavi

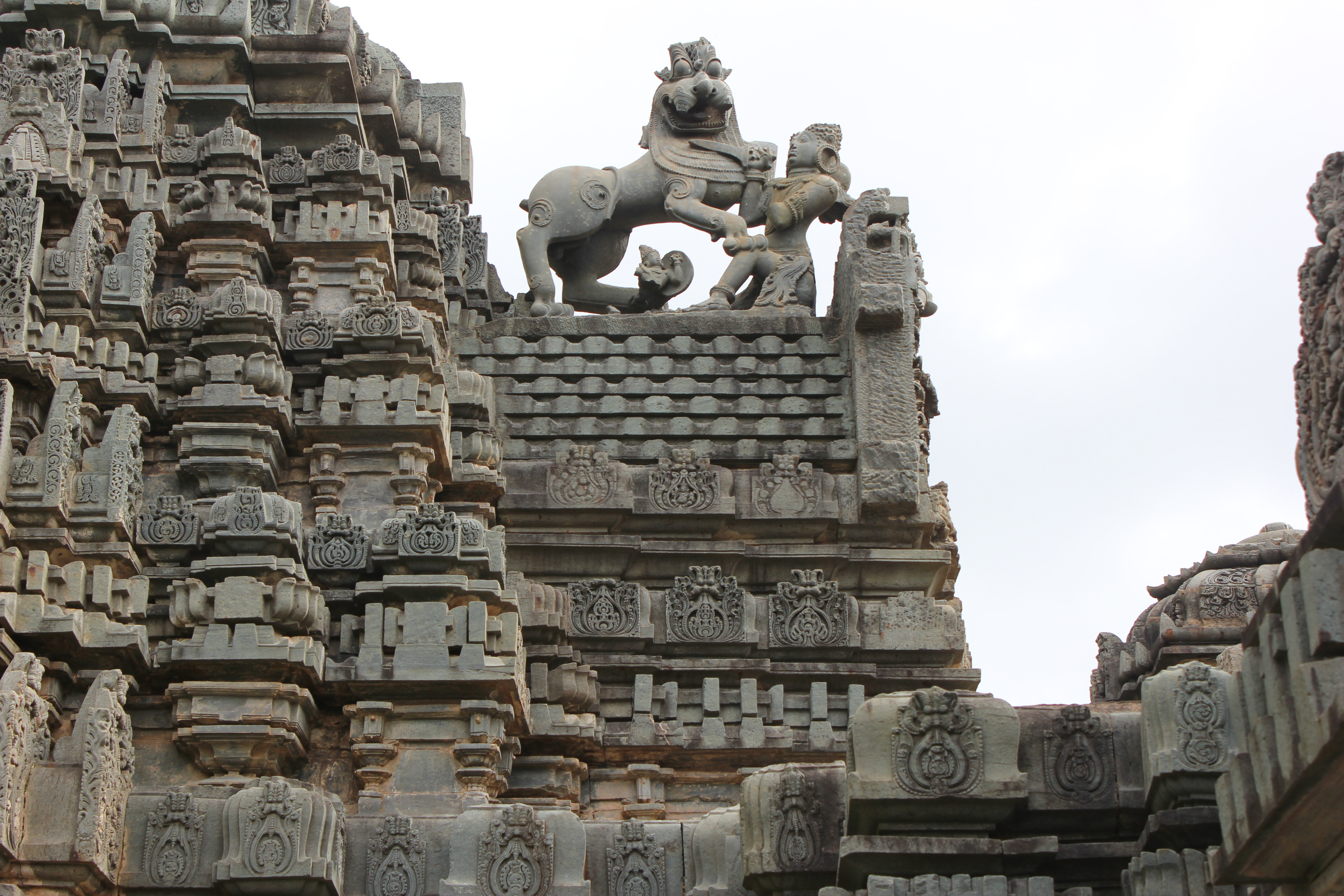
The Hoysala crest (warrior fighting the lion) is a 12th-century addition in Kedareshvara temple at Balligavi

The temple is in trikuta style (three shrined, each with a superstructure or shikhara) with the shrines facing east, north, and south. The western shrine has a vestibule where as the other two shrines have a "half hall" (ardhamantapa). All shrines open up to a six-pillared hall called mahamantapa which is preceded by a large ornate open "gathering hall" called sabhamantapa. The layout of the gathering hall is "staggered square" which has the effect of creating projections and recesses. Each projection of the wall has a complete "architectural articulation" (achieved by repetitive decoration). The gathering hall has entrances from the north, south and eastern directions.

== Decoration ==
The outer walls of the shrines are quite austere save for the pilasters that are capped by miniature decorative towers (aedicula). The superstructures over the shrines are 3-tiered (tritala arpita) vesara (combination of south and north Indian style) with the sculptural details being repeated in each tier. The temple exhibits other standard features present in a Hoysala style temple: the large decorative domed roof over the tower; the kalasha on top of it (the decorative water-pot at the apex of the dome); and the Hoysala crest (emblem of the Hoysala warrior stabbing a lion) over the sukhanasi (tower over the vestibule). The dome is the largest sculptural piece in the temple with ground surface area of about 2x2 meters and is called the "helmet" or amalaka. Its shape usually follows that of the shrine (square or star shape). The tower over the vestibules of the three shrines appear as low protrusions of the main tower and is hence called the "nose".

== Gallery ==
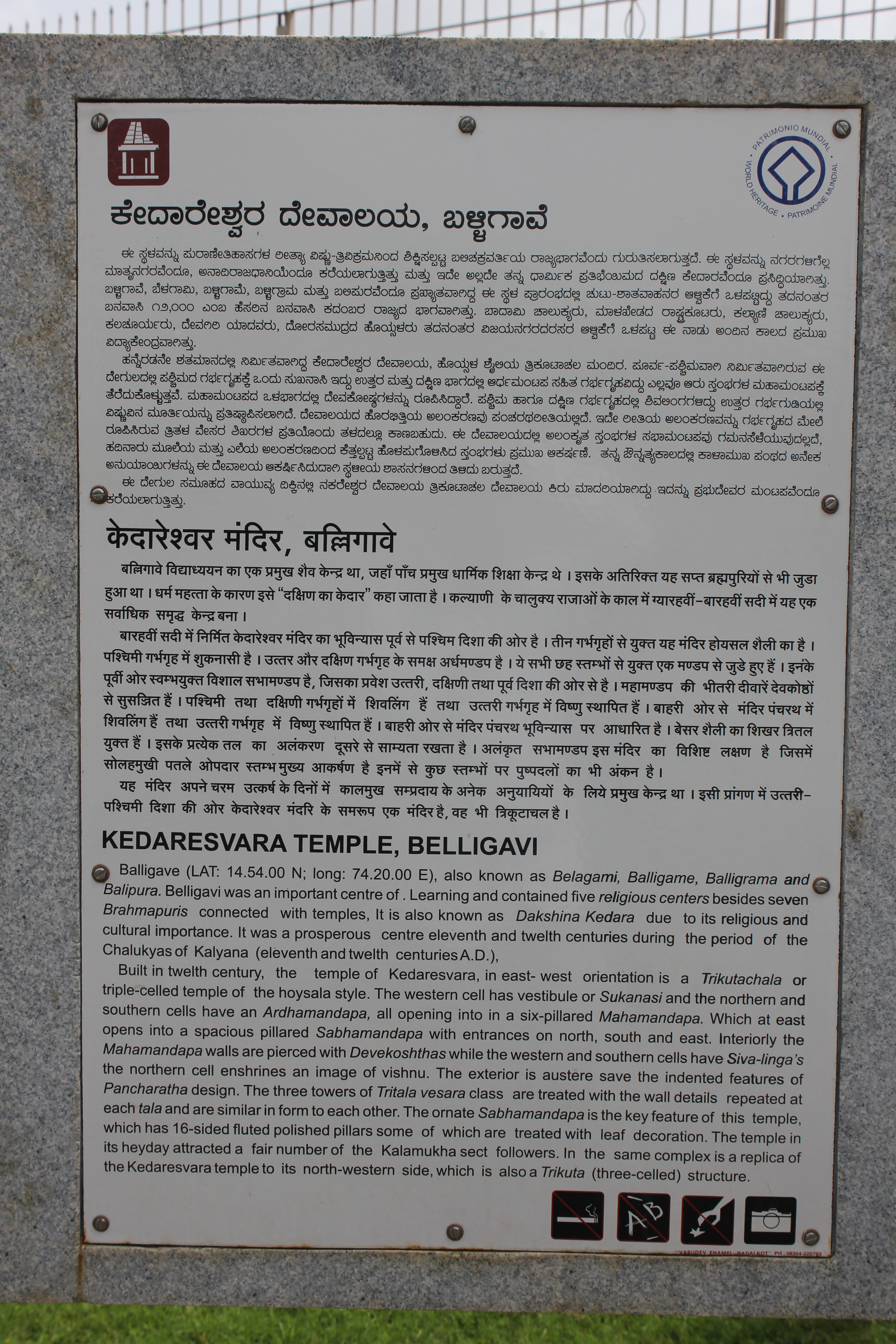
About Kedaresvara temple, Balligavi

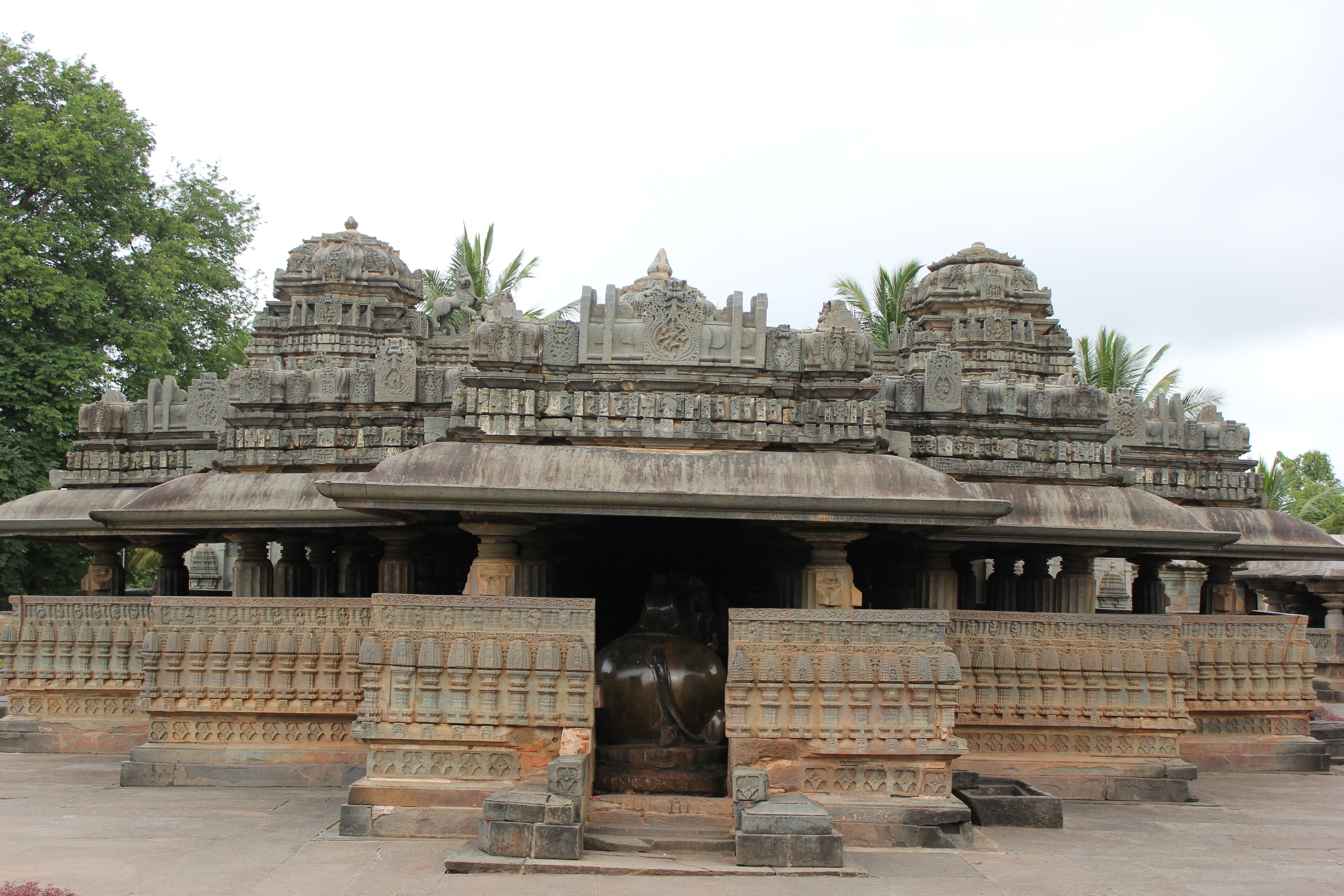
A frontal view displays the staggered square layout of mantapa (hall) in Kedareshvara temple at Balligavi

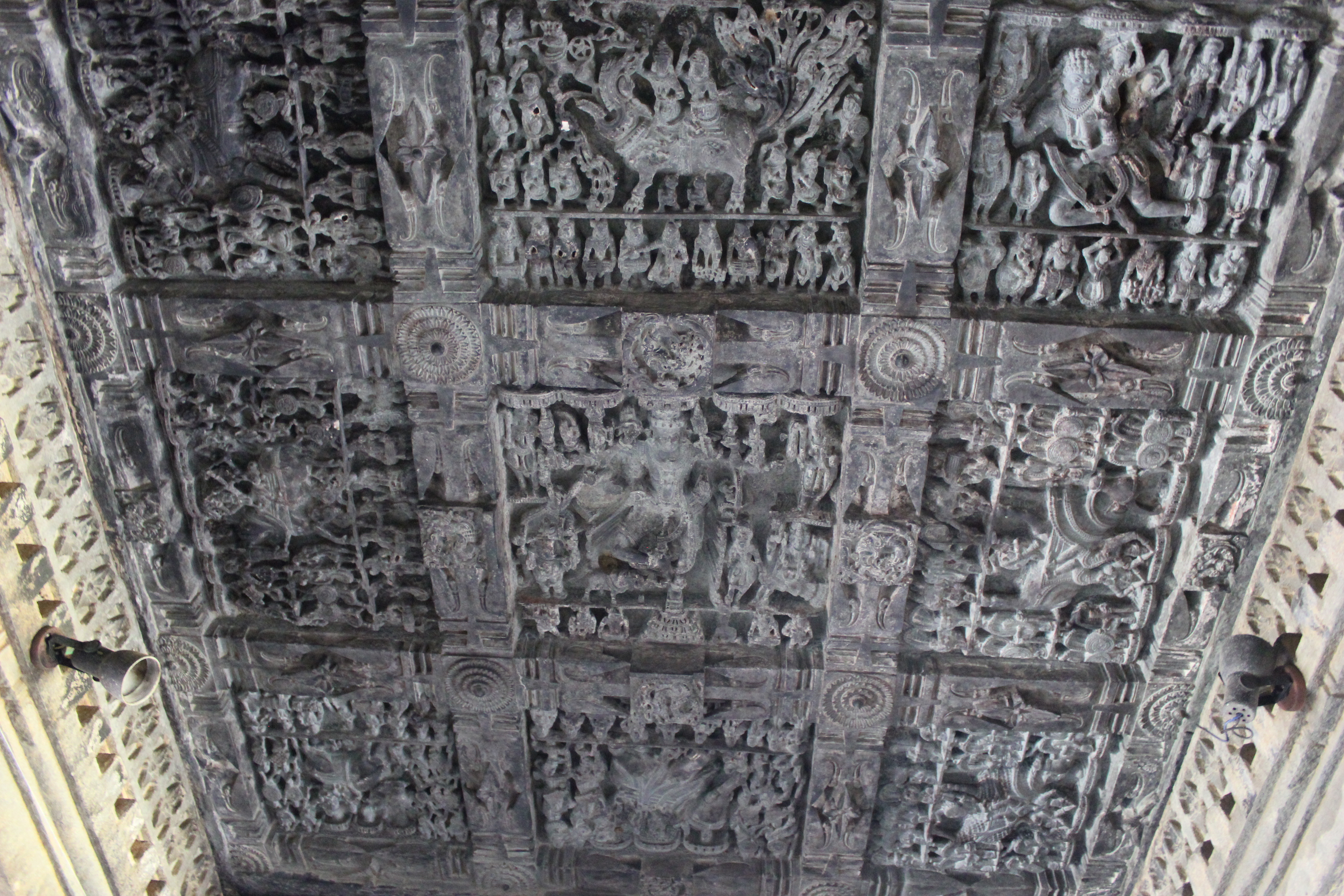
Ornate bay ceiling in Kedaresvhara temple at Balligavi

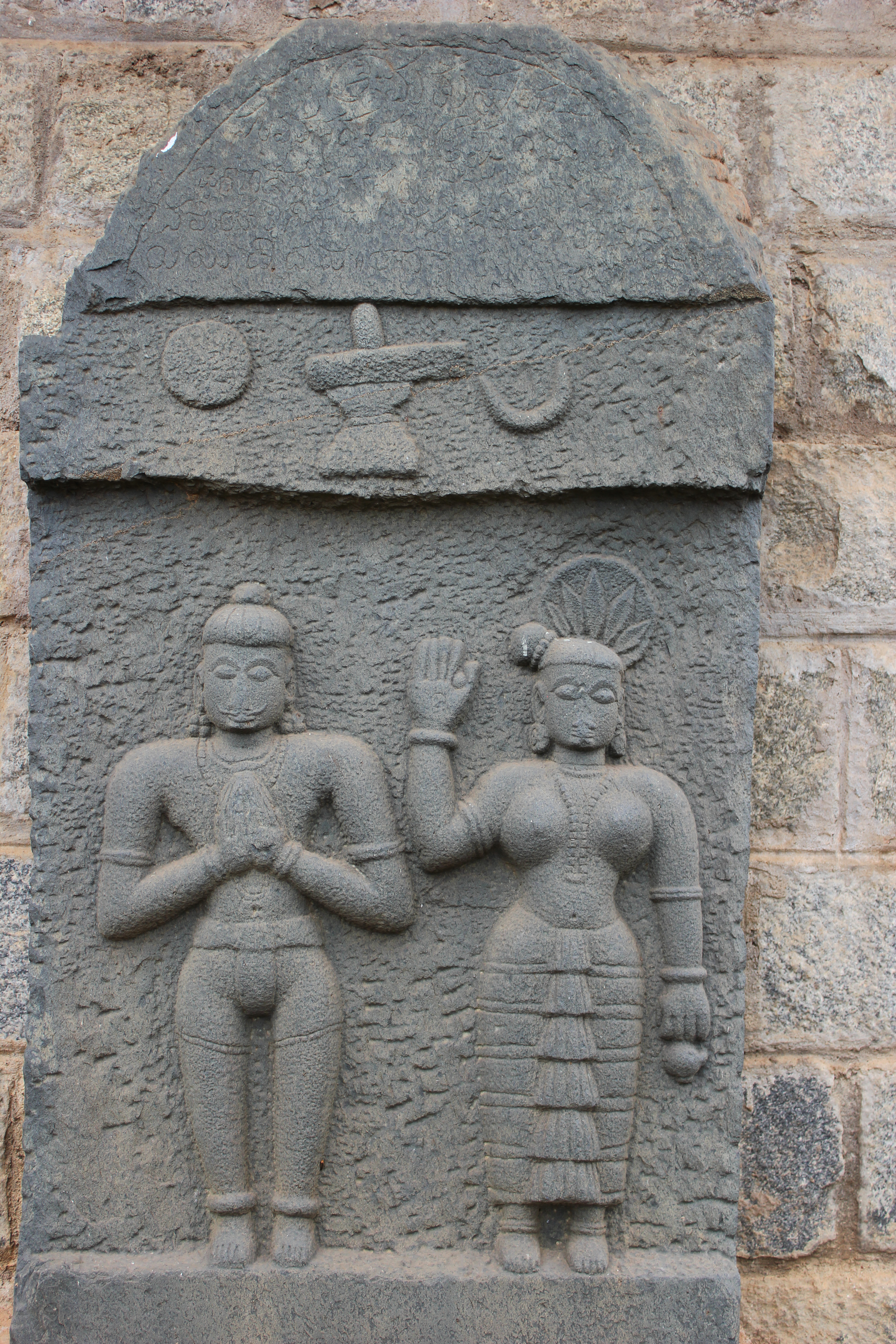
A Sati stone (satigal) with old Kannada inscription of 1206 in Kedareshvara temple at Balligavi

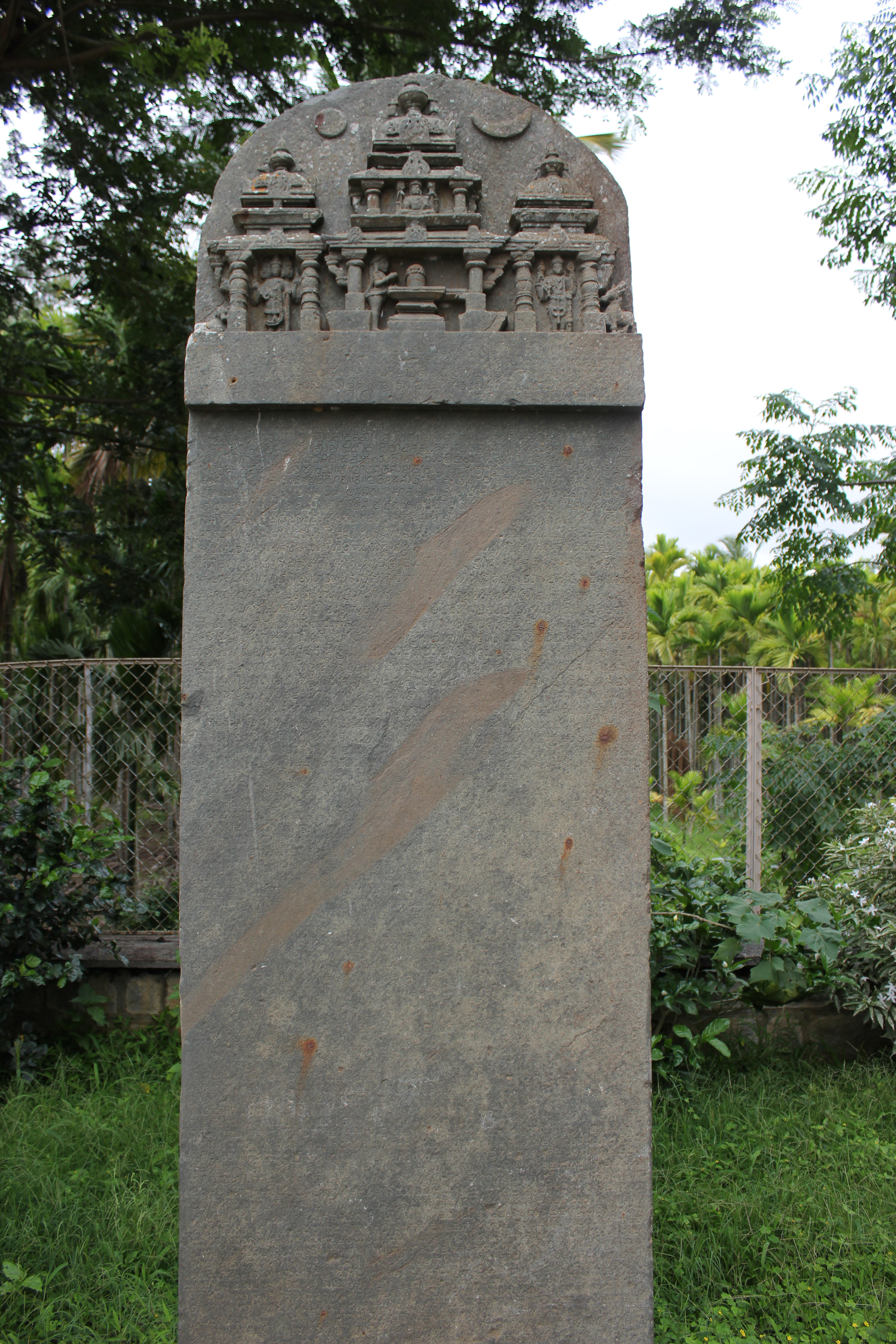
Old Kannada inscription (1161) of Southern Kalachuri King Bijjala at the Kedareshvara temple at Balligavi

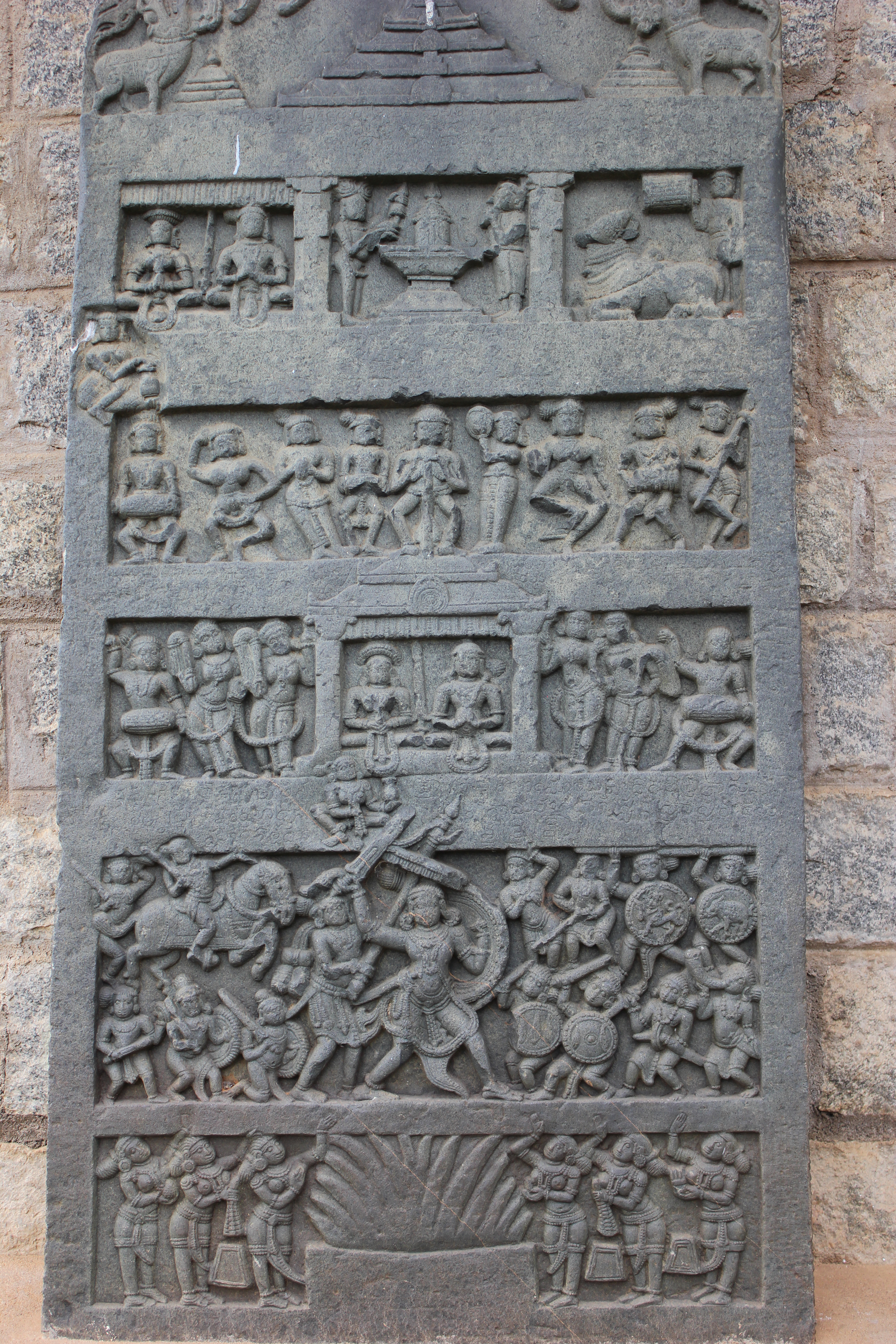
Hero stone (virgal) with old Kannada inscription of 1263 from the rule of Yadava King Ramachandra in Kedareshvara temple at Balligavi

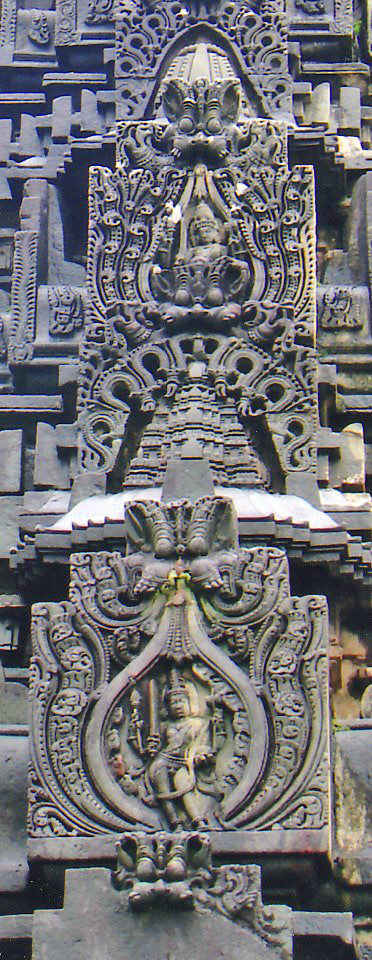
Kirtimukha (demon face) on shikhara (tower) of Kedareshvara temple at Balligavi

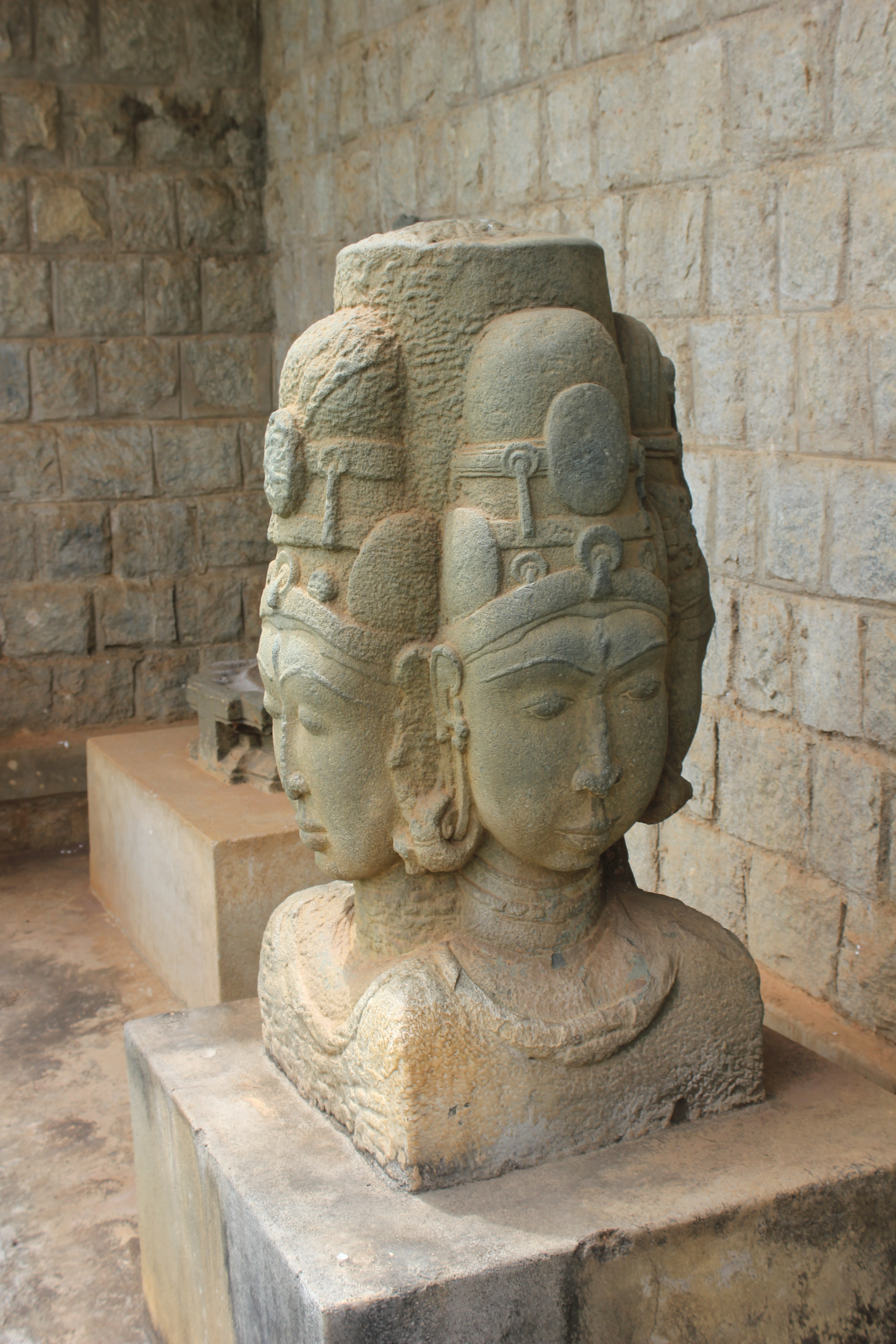
Chaturmukha Brahma image at museum on temple premises

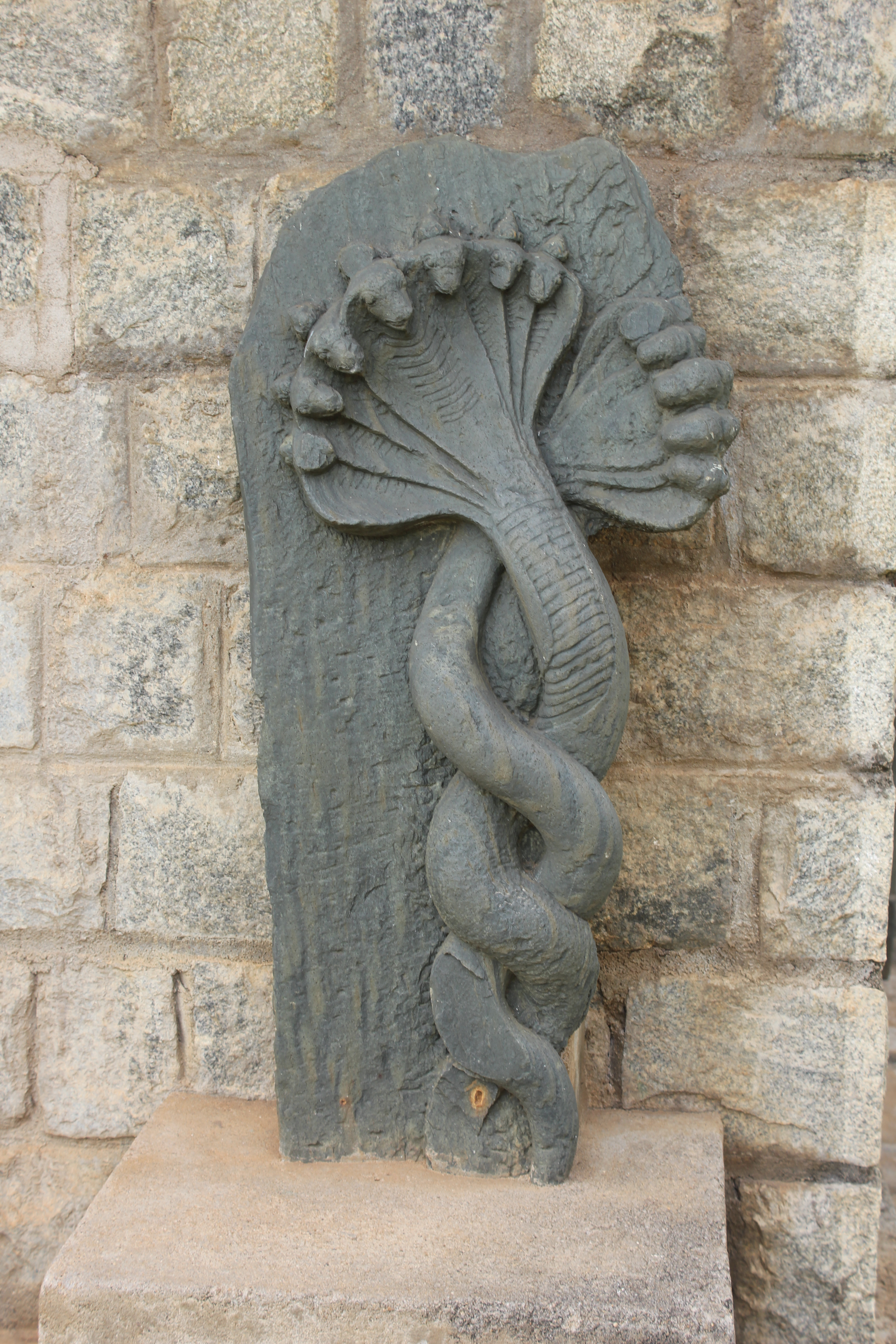
Dev Naga (god snake) image at museum on temple premises

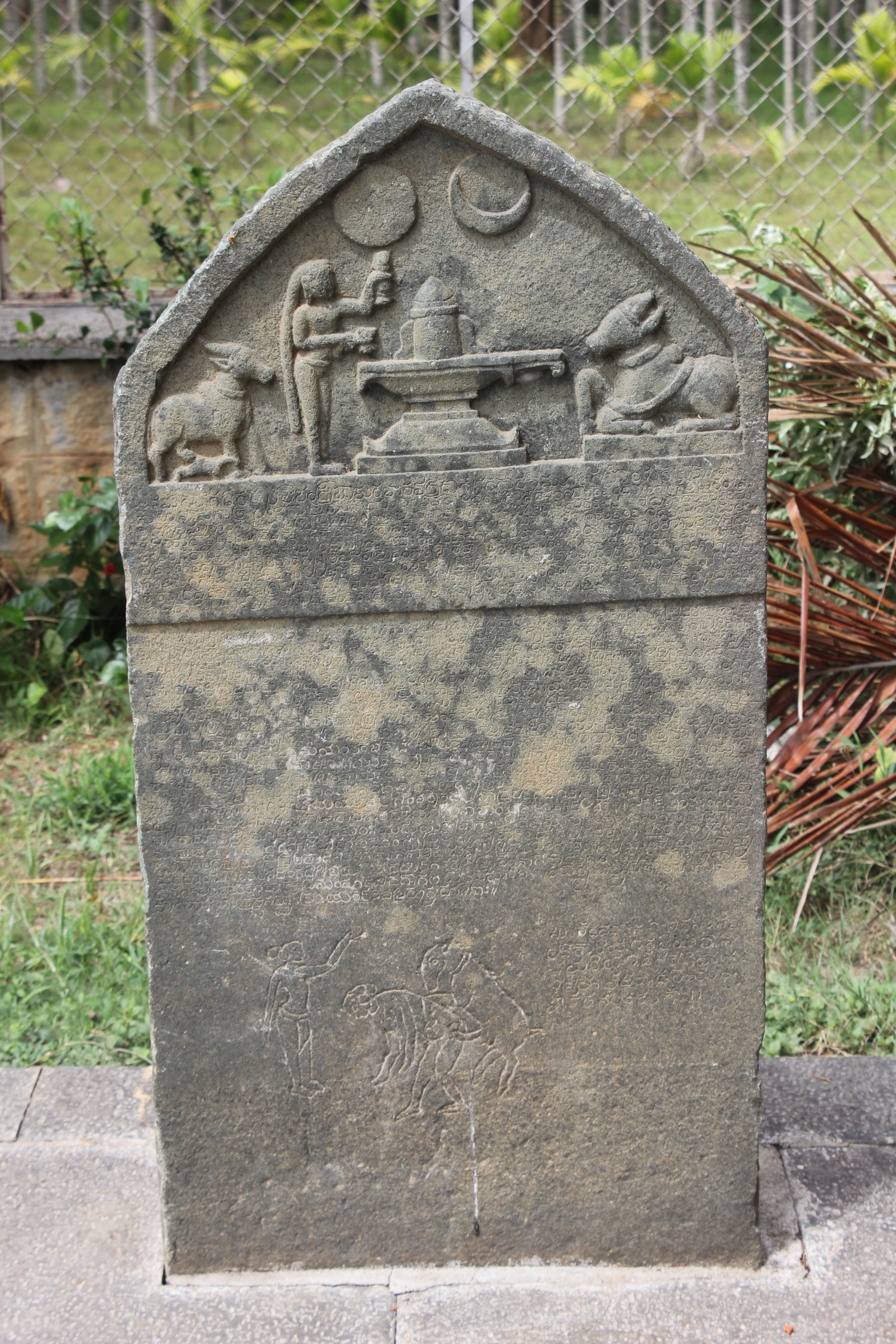
Old Kannada inscription

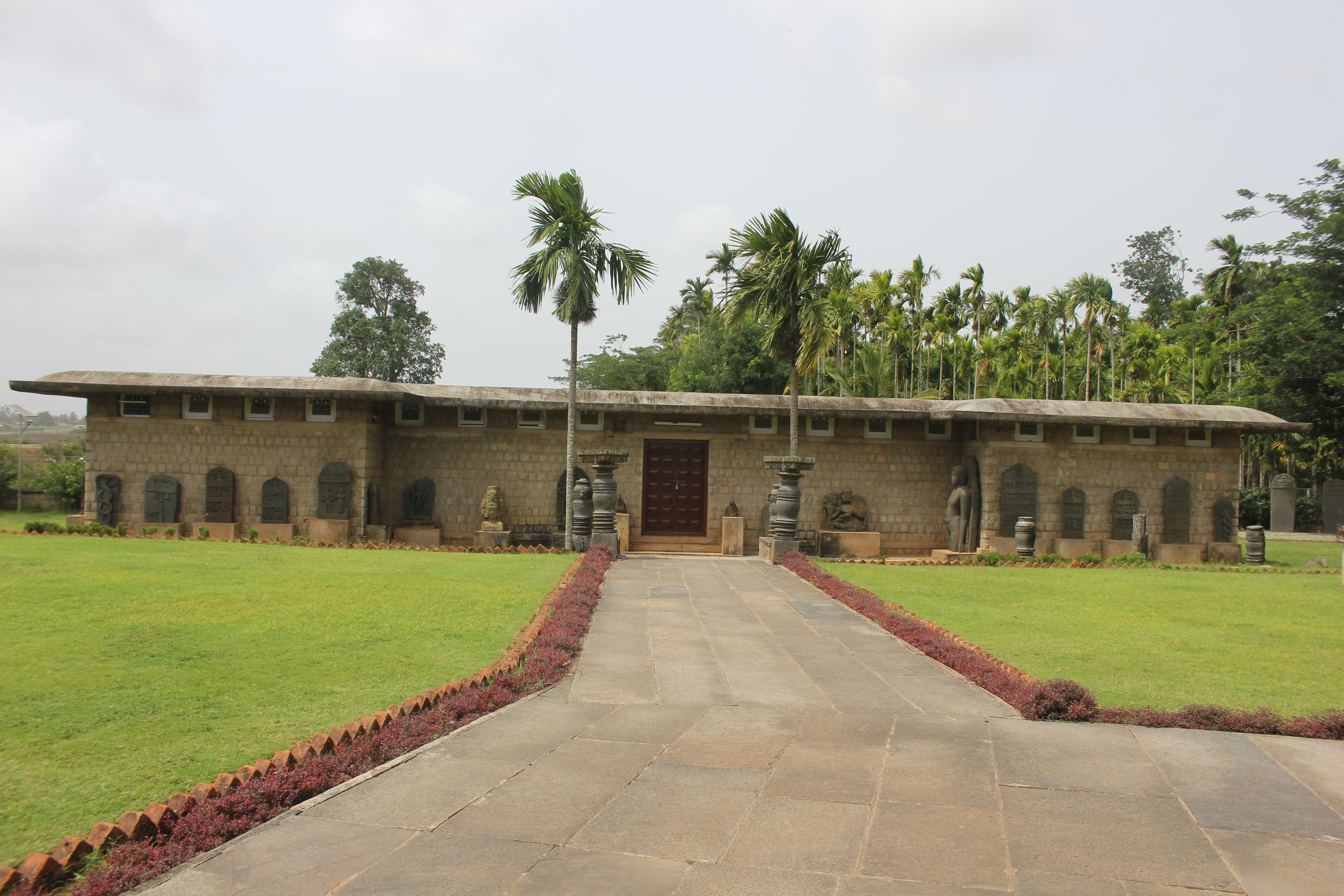
Museum at Kedareshvara temple premises, Balligavi
