= Vesara =

Indian architectural style

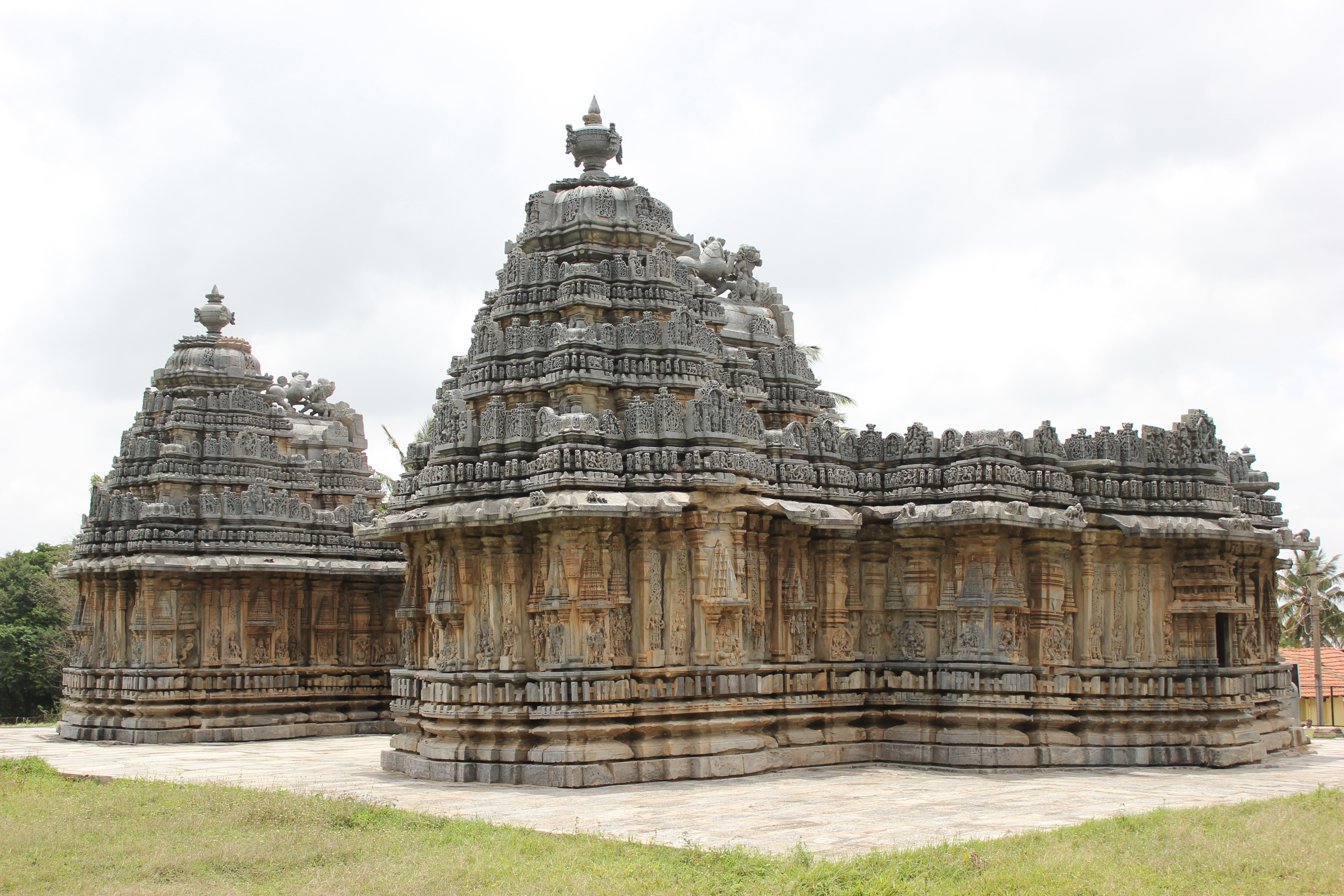
Negeshvara (near) and Chennakeshava (far), Hoysala dynasty, 11th century.

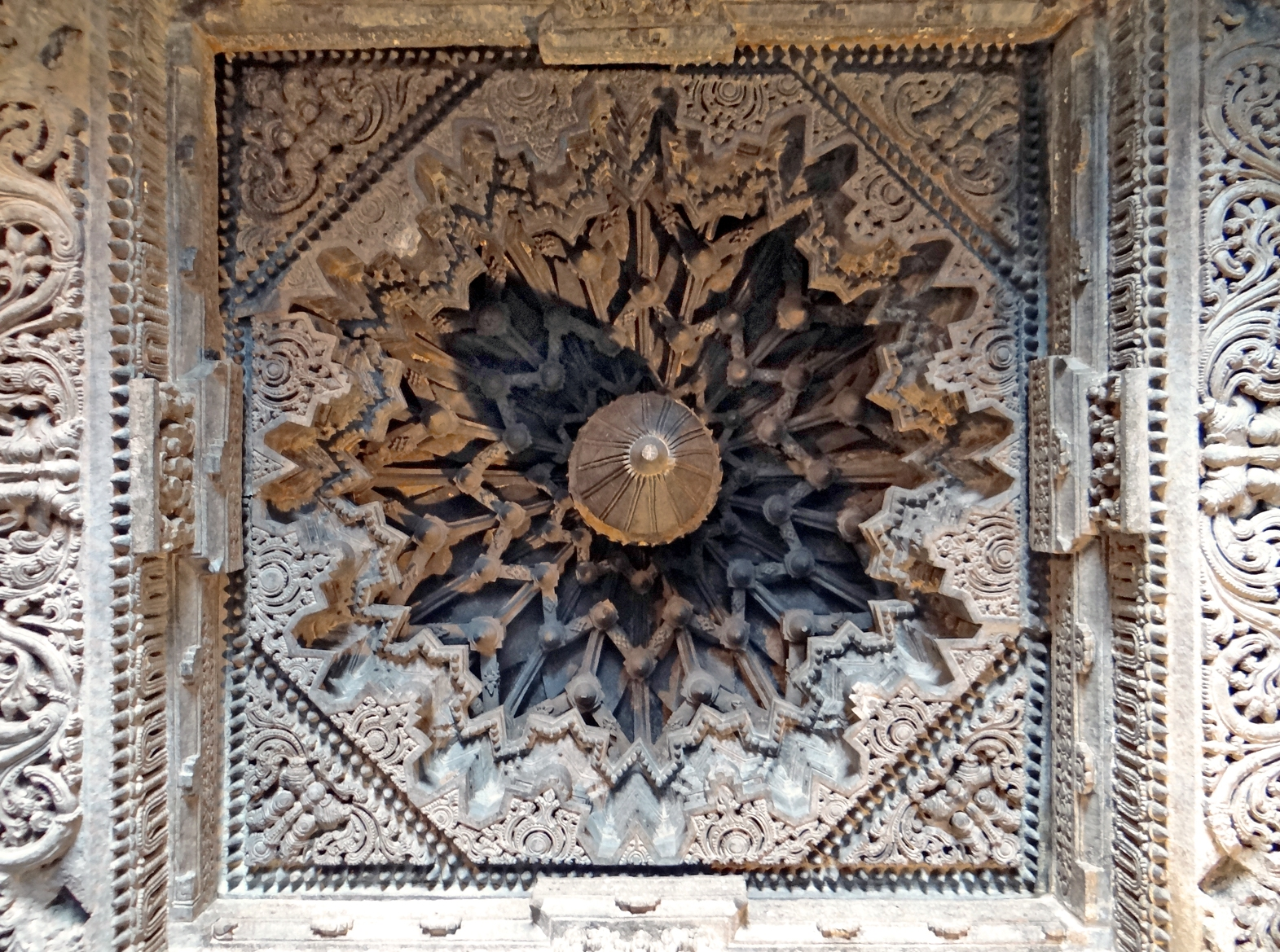
Ornate ceiling in Chennakesava temple, 11th century.

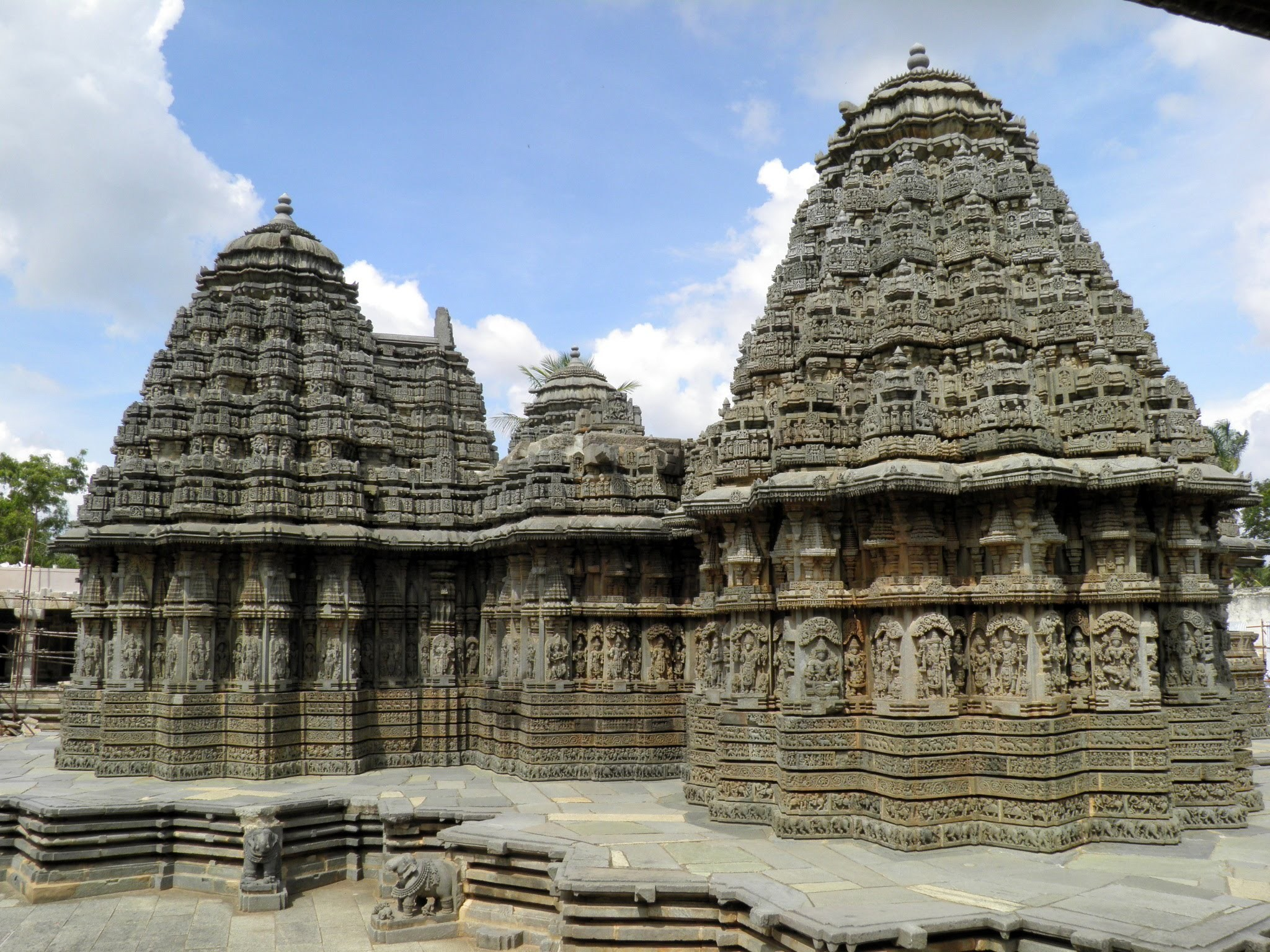
Keshava temple, 11th century

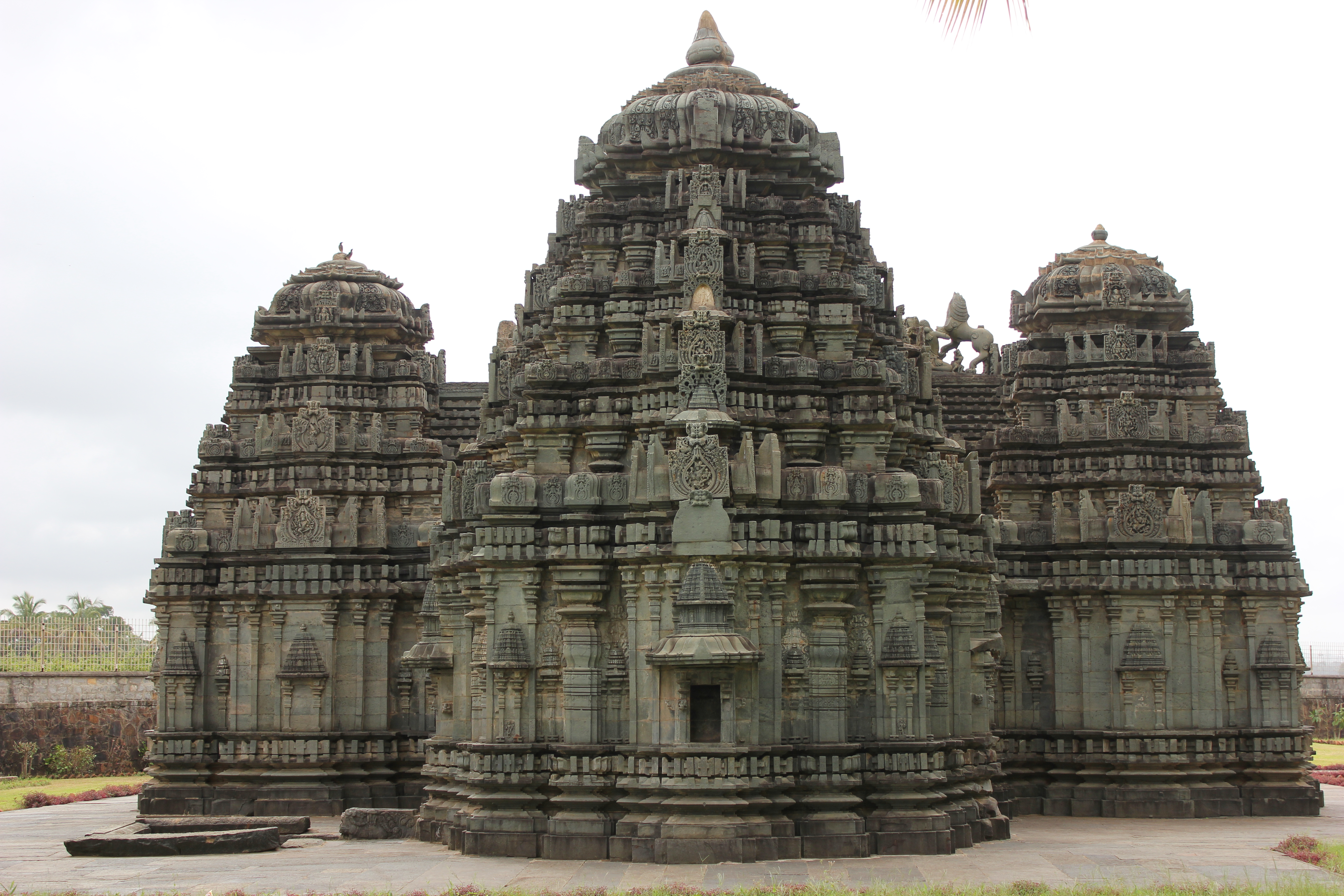
Kedareshvara temple, Hoysala dynasty, 11th century.

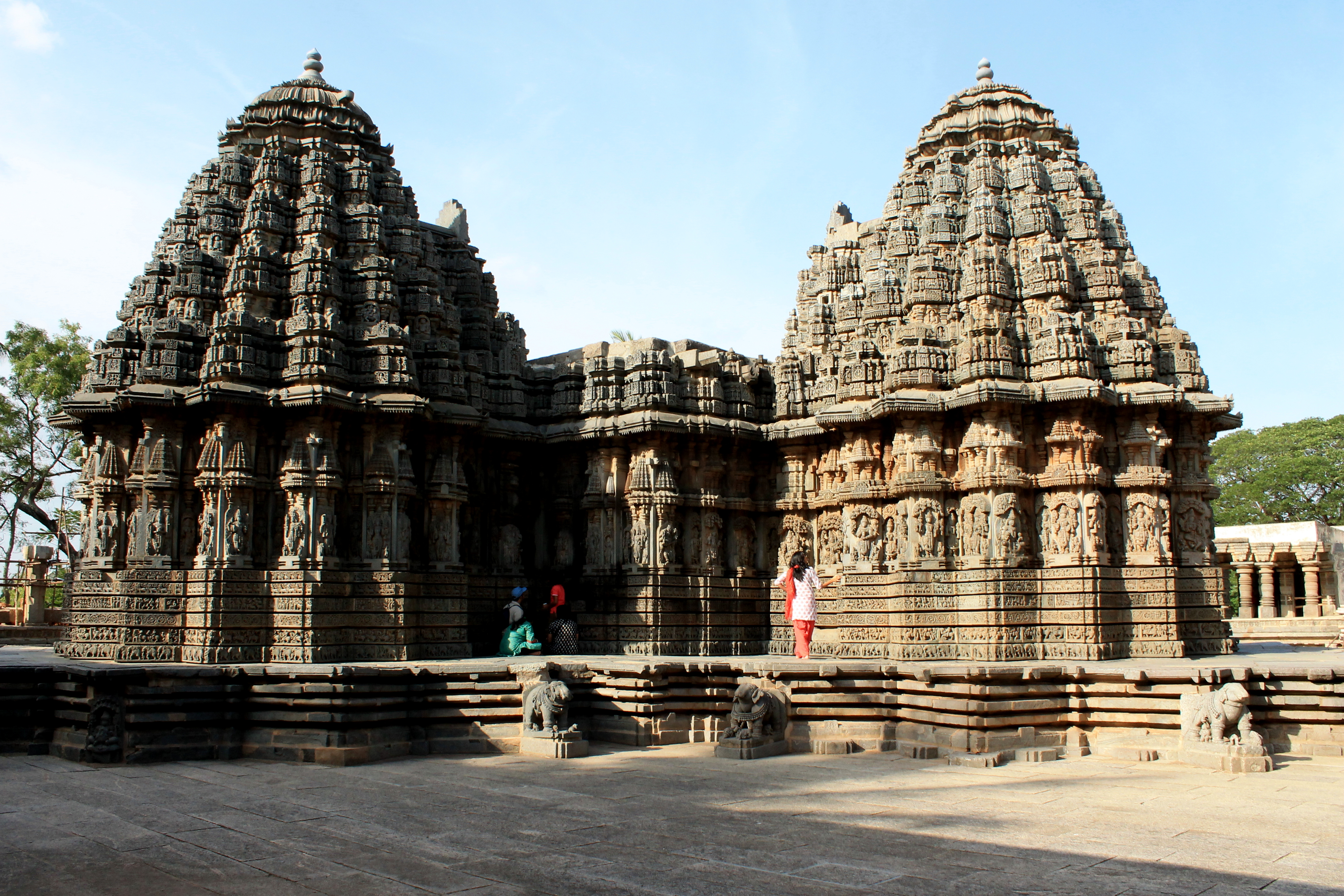
Chennakeshava temple, 11th century.

Vesara is a hybrid form of Indian temple architecture that combines Dravidian Southern Indian site layouts with shape details characteristic of the Nagara style of North India. This fusion style likely originated in the historic architecture schools of the Dharwad region. It is common in the surviving temples of the later Chalukyas and Hoysalas in the Deccan region, particularly Karnataka. According to Indian texts, Vesara Style was popular in central India, particularly in between the Vindhya Range and the Krishna River. It is one of six major types of Indian temple architecture found in historic texts, the others being Nagara, Dravida, Bhumija, Kalinga, and Varata.

Some scholars like Adam Hardy avoid using the term "Vesara" because although ancient writers used the word, they may have intended different meanings from its modern usage. Alternative terms for the tradition's whole timespan, from the 7th to the 13th century CE, include "Karnata Dravida" (Hardy's choice), "Central Indian temple architecture style", "Deccan architecture", or for shorter periods, terms referring to local dynasties, such as "Chalukyan architecture". Increasingly precise alternatives might include "Early Chalukya" or "Badami Chalukya architecture", "Later" or "Kalyana" or "Western Chalukya architecture", and "Hoysala architecture", depending on dynastic and regional specifics.

Among those who do use "Vesara", there is some disagreement as to the periods to which it applies. Such disagreements are largely restricted to matters of the term's usefulness and extent. There is general agreement about most aspects of the actual surviving buildings.

== Etymology ==
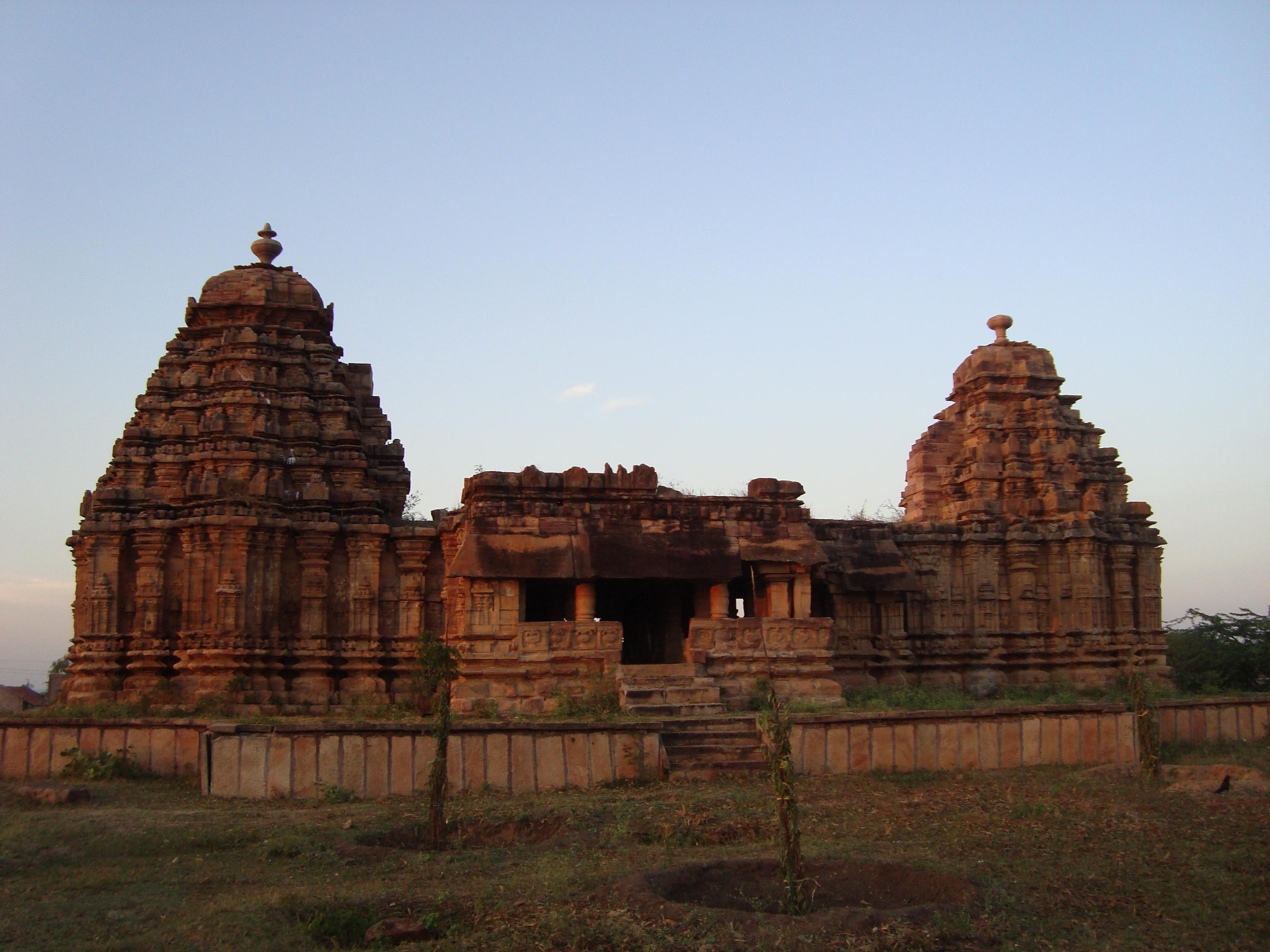
Joda-kalasha temple, Sudi, Karnataka – another early innovator of the Vesara-style (c. 1060 CE).

Vesara means mule. The south Indian text Kamika-agama explains that this name is derived from its mixed nature, as its plan is Dravidian, yet its shape is Nagara in the details. The same text says that Vesara is also called Sankara (hybrid) for the same reason.

== Texts ==
The Vesara style is not mentioned by name in north Indian texts on architecture, according to contemporary architectural scholars. In contrast, it is a term found in most South Indian texts on architecture alongside Dravida and Nagara. This pattern suggests that the Vesara style originally emerged and grew in the south of the subcontinent. The Manasara regionally categorizes Nagara in the north, Dravida in the south and Vesara in the middle. It goes on to state that Nagara emphasizes the four sides, Dravida a polygon (octagon), while Vesara compliments both with circular or elliptical forms. Given the many post-10th-century Hindu and Jain temple structures and ruins in Vesara form that have survived in Karnataka, the Vesara style has been linked to Karnataka and texts composed there.

In general, many South Indian texts state that Vesara is a building that is "circular or round" in plan above its karna (base) or kantha (neck). Some examples of this definition for Vesara are found in verse 50.15–17 of the Svayambhuva-agama, verse 7.117 of the Karana-agama, verse 12.68 of the Ajita-agama, verse 30.41 of the Suprebheda-agama and others. On the other hand, verse 7.15 of the Dipta-agama, verse 9.3 of the Padma-samhita, and verse 30.44–45 of Ishana-Sivagurudeva-Paddhati state that a Vesara may be circular, elliptical or apsidal in plan. A third view is proffered in the section 6 of the Marichi samhita, verses 18.47–48 of the Manasara, and verses 19.36–38 of the Mayamata, namely that a Vesara can be circular or it can be a square up to prastara and then is circular from the griva (neck) onwards. (Note: The Manasara states that the Vesara can be circular or elliptical all the way from base to stupi, or square below and round above, or an apsidal temple.)

There are other theoretical classifications of Hindu temple architecture, with South Indian texts using the plan and North Indian texts using the overall shape and form, in particular of the superstructure. However, the realized temples built before the 17th century show such an abundance of experimentation, innovations and overlapping varieties that scholars generally avoid adhering to strict theoretical terms. For example, while the theory in Manasara states that Dravida temples are those south Indian temples that have an octagonal (or polygonal) plan, historic Dravidian temples with octagonal plans either were never built or have not survived into the modern age. Similarly, even on the walls of Hindu and Jain temples of Karnataka, there is no depiction of any elliptical temple. This may be because the sthanpati (architect) and silpins (artisans) in 9th to 11th century Karnataka were deliberately ignoring traditional texts and experimenting with novel and innovative approaches.

== History ==
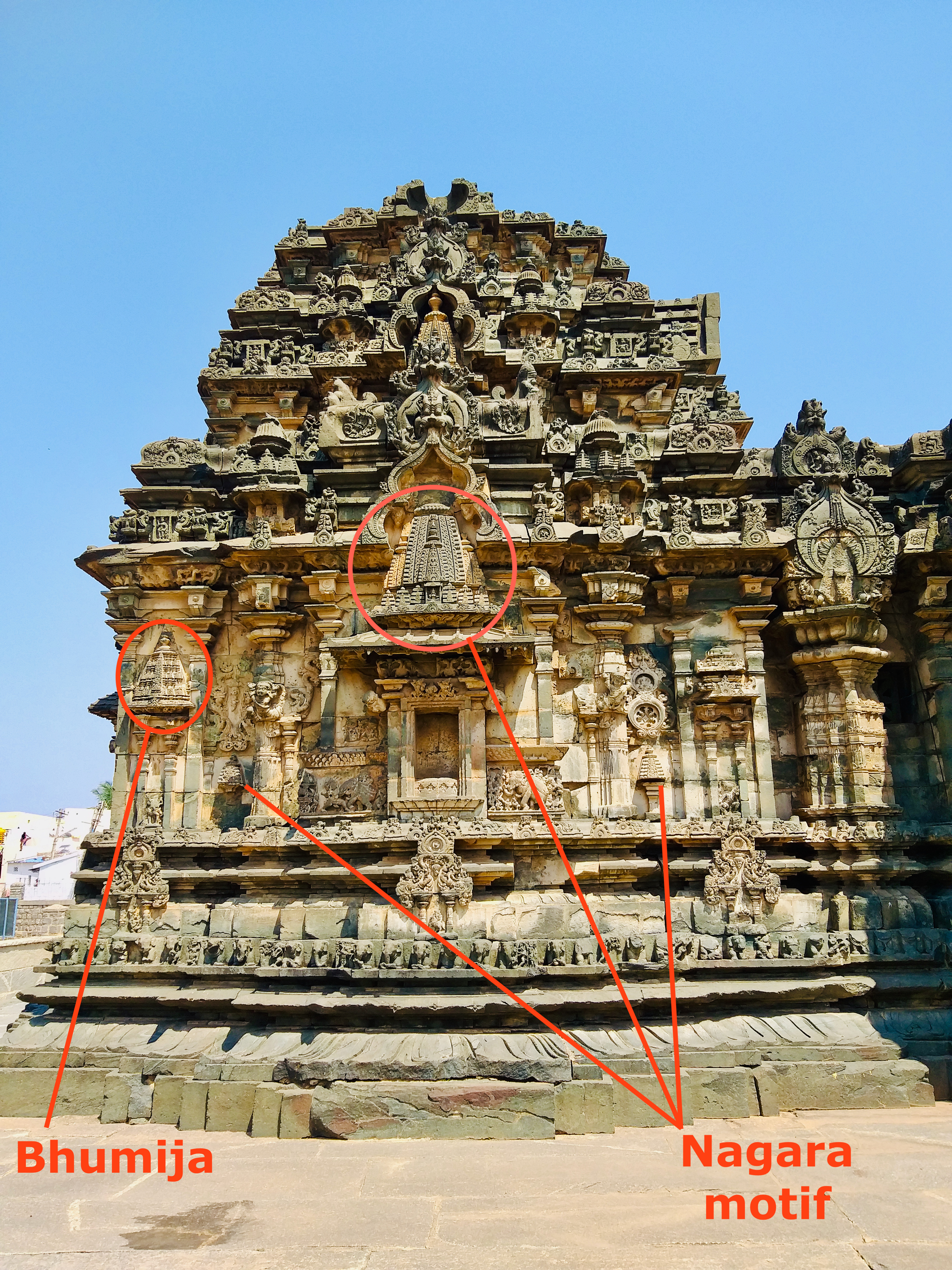
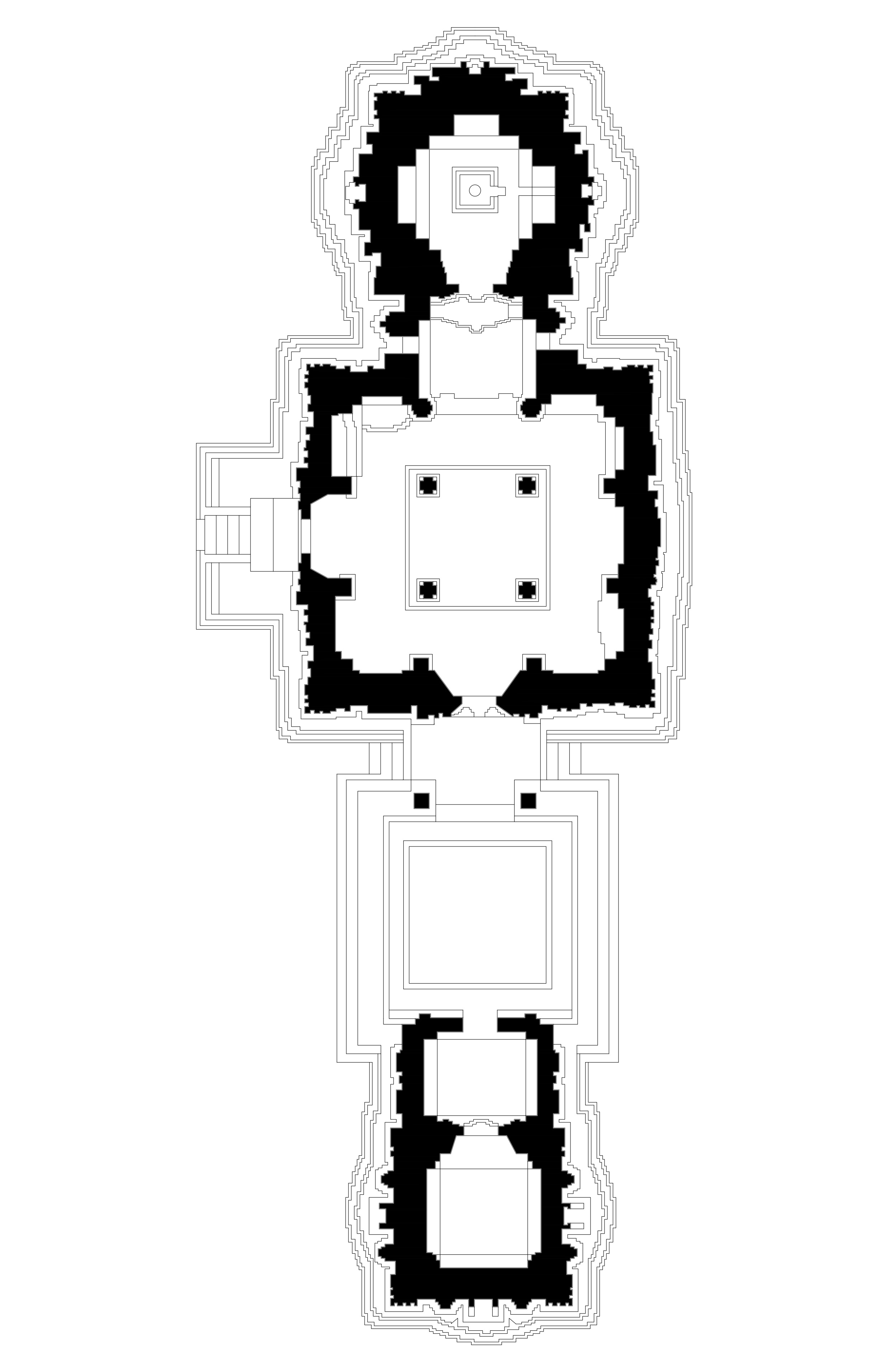
Kasivisvesvara temple at Lakkundi (1075 CE) fully illustrates the Vesara architecture. Left: On the pronounced bhadra are Nagara and Bhumija motifs; Right: in the floor plan, the bhadra bulge helps fuse Dravida-Nagara ideas, harmonizing the aesthetics outside and inside the temple. In the 19th-century, the British scholar Burgess remarked, this temple has "one of the finest surviving illustration of Hindu decorative artwork in India".

The Vesara style originated in the region between the Krishna and Tungabhadra rivers that today is northern Karnataka. According to some art historians, the roots of Vesara style can be traced to the Chalukyas of Badami (500 – 753 AD) whose Early Chalukya or Badami Chalukya architecture featured temples in a style that mixed some features of the Nagara and the Dravida styles. For example, they used both the northern shikhara and southern vimana type of superstructure over the sanctum in different temples of similar date, such as at Pattadakal. This style was further refined by the Rashtrakutas of Manyakheta (750 – 983 AD) in sites like Ellora. Though there is clearly a good deal of continuity with the Badami or Early Chalukya style, some writers only date the start of Vesara to the later Western Chalukyas of Kalyani (983 – 1195 AD), whose sites include Lakkundi, Dambal, Itagi, and Gadag, and the later Hoysala empire (1000 – 1330 AD).

Other art historians such as Sinha state that experimentation and innovations in Hindu temple architecture began quite early in Karnataka at sites such as Aihole, Pattadakal, Badami and Mahakuta where both Nagara and Dravida temples were built close to each other. However, each of these temples more or less retained their historic identity. Vesara, states Sinha, should not be treated as a simple mixture of Nagara and Dravida, but as a deliberate architectural synthesis grounded in the available materials and construction methods in India from the 7th to 12th centuries. This view is supported by inscriptions discovered in the north Karnataka region. For example, at the mid-11th-century Joda Kalasha Hindu temple in Sudi – an early Vesara example – an inscription is visible in a mix of Sanskrit and Kannada below Shaiva iconography. It mentions Somesvara I and saka 981 (circa 1060 AD). After mentioning Hindu dynasties all over the Indian subcontinent, successful public works, ascetics and the schools of the silpins, it states in verses 16–17:

Shankararya constructed in the middle of the town of Shundi (Note: now spelled Sudi) a dwelling for Nagesvara [Shiva] so that the finials were completed in a manner that none could possibly imagine.

— Translated by Lionel Barnett, quoted by Ajay Sinha (Note: For the complete inscription and the context, see Epigraphia Indica, Vol. 15 Part 1, pp. 85–94.)

The Joda Kalasha temple thus was a challenging innovation on a trend whose earliest surviving sample is in what is now the Kukkanur village of Karnataka, the Kallesvara (Shiva) temple (1000 – 1025 AD). The Kukkanur temple shows mostly Dravidian features, particularly in the superstructure. The sanctum and mandapa, however, introduce a projecting bhadra with rhythmically placed thin pilasters. This thereby incorporates Nagara style and takes an initial step in harmonizing the relationship between how the viewer aesthetically experiences the temple from the outside and from the inside. This bhadra innovation required changes in temples' construction methods and superstructure layouts. These changes were further perfected as the 11th century progressed in Karnataka. The Sudi temple was a significant step forward. The Kasivisvesvara temple in Lakkundi marked a high point of architectural and artistic accomplishment in the Vesara style. Thereafter, many more innovations were introduced and increasingly sophisticated Kalayana Chalukya and Hoysala temples were built in the emerging Vesara style through the 13th century.

== Description ==
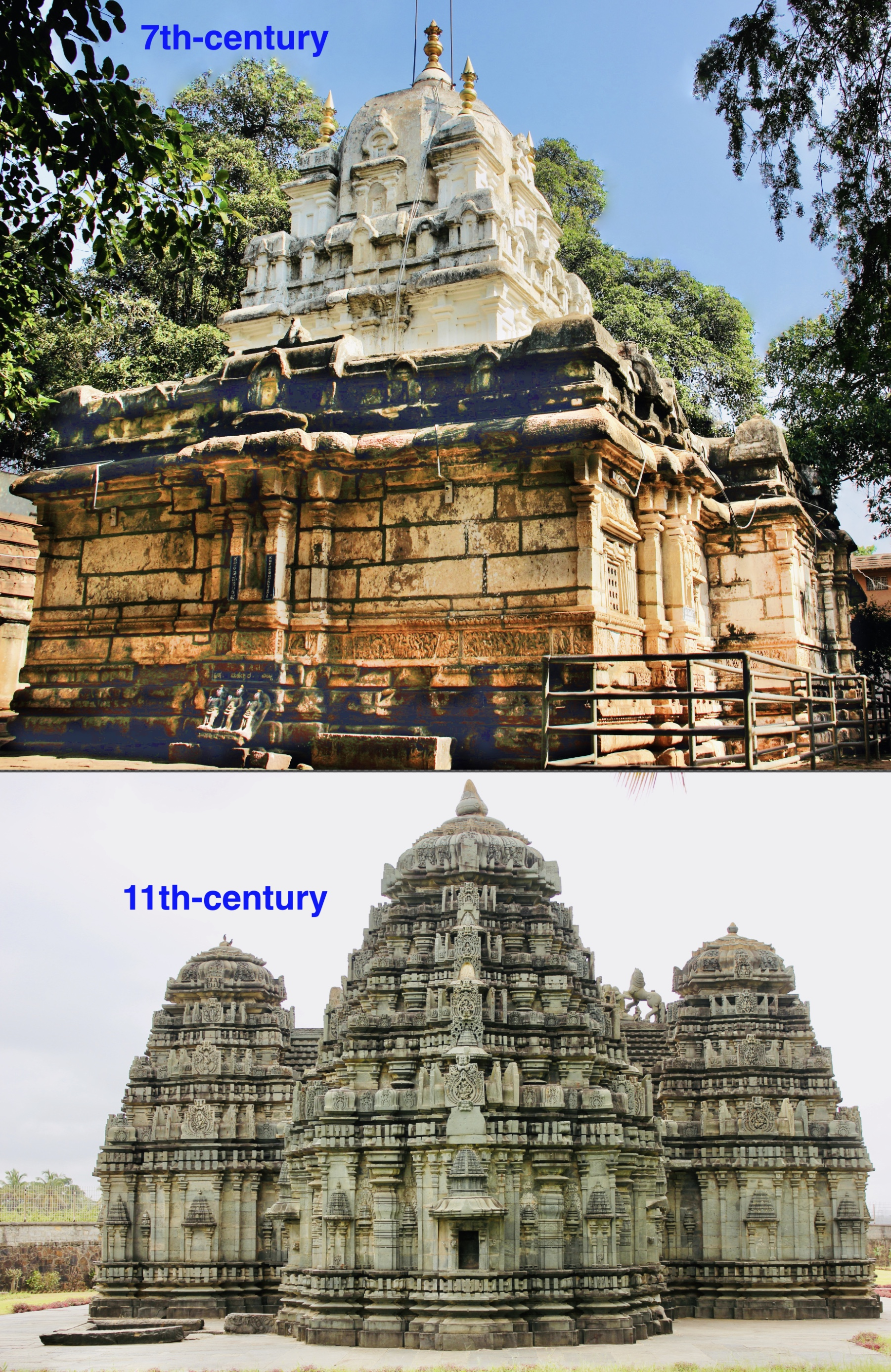
Upper: 7th-century Mahakutesvara temple with Dravida architecture (Mahakuta complex of Hindu temples, east of Badami); Lower: 11th-century Kedareshvara Temple, Balligavi in developed Vesara form (highly evolved bhadra, with miniature northern shikharas as motifs).

The Vesara architecture departs from the Dravida architecture in several key conceptual and experiential ways: it projects the bhadra; widens the sanctum (and mandapa); takes it ever closer to a rounded form; adds motifs and decoration to the outer walls; and changes how the temple aesthetically appears both outside and inside to the pilgrims. The Vesara form allowed the architect and artisans to add more narrative panels about the Epics, the Puranas, the Vedic legends, scenes of artha, kama, dharma (divine iconography). These accompanied illustrations of different types of temple shikaras as aedicules to the outside and inside. This ornamentation sharply contrasts with the plain structures found in the Dravida temples of earlier centuries.

The Vesara style (if defined as beginning only with the Western Chalukyas in the late 10th century) contains elements of both Dravida and Nagara styles. In particular the shape of the superstructure over the sanctum is usually pyramidal in profile, and shorter than the northern shikhara tower. The walls and superstructure are broadly circular or a straight-sided cone, though the geometry is based on rotating a square imposed on a circle. Vesara also contains unique decorative motifs. A common motif is miniature shikharas, often of the Bhumija type, showing that the architects were well aware of northern styles. Like the southern vimana superstructure, the Vesara equivalent is strongly divided into storeys or steps, but there are more of them, and the kapota roof motif is less dominant than in contemporaneous southern vimanas.

George Michell describes a characteristic feature as "the obscuring of the outer profile of the building by multiplying the projections of the walls and superstructure; these move restlessly from one plane to another, relying upon effects of light and shade to lend the building its solidity and shape."

There are generally prominent sukanasa projections from the tower on the roof over an antarala antechamber to the sanctum. The mandapa is generally larger than the sanctum and its vimana, while further open mandapas may be larger still. Some shrines have multiple temples, especially three. These are usually with three entrances off the same mandapa, as at the Chennakesava Temple, Somanathapura and Kedareshvara Temple, Balligavi; the two side shrines are at 90° angles to the central, main one.

Comparisons with Bhumija and Varata architectures

According to Dubey, there is no consensus in pre-13th-century Indian tradition as to how Vesara should be described or identified. The conditions and "mixed" features for Vesara are also found in Bhumija and Varata architecture, where synthesis and innovation drives the North Indian and South Indian towards being variants of each other. The discovery of early examples of elliptical, circular, apsidal Hindu temples, states Dubey, may correspond to the Vesara as they once existed, and as such what the South Indian texts were referring to when they were composed. Adam Hardy states that these inventive forms are better understood in terms of the architecture schools and their geographical context, bearing in mind that those schools shared and competed in their ideas. Vesara evolved in Karnataka, Varata in the Vidarbha-Berar region, Kalinga in Odisha, and Bhumija in Malwa.

== Examples ==
The early Vesara temples are primarily near and between the Tungabhadra River and the Krishna River before they merge. These sites include:

- Kallesvara temple, Kukkanur
- Ramalingesvara temple, Gudur
- Mahadeva temple, Ittagi
- Kasivisvesvara temple, Lakkundi (and several other temples at Lakkundi)
- Brahmadeva temple, Savadi – notable for being fully stellate
- Mallikarjuna temple, Sudi (and Joda Kalasha temple)

Later Vesara temples include the Hoysala temples at Belur, Halebidu and Somanathapura. Three temples among these (Hoysaleswara Temple at Halebidu, Chennakesava Temple at Belur, Chennkesava temple at Somanathapura) have been added to the UNESCO World Heritage Site List as Sacred Ensembles of Hoysalas in 2023.

== Gallery ==
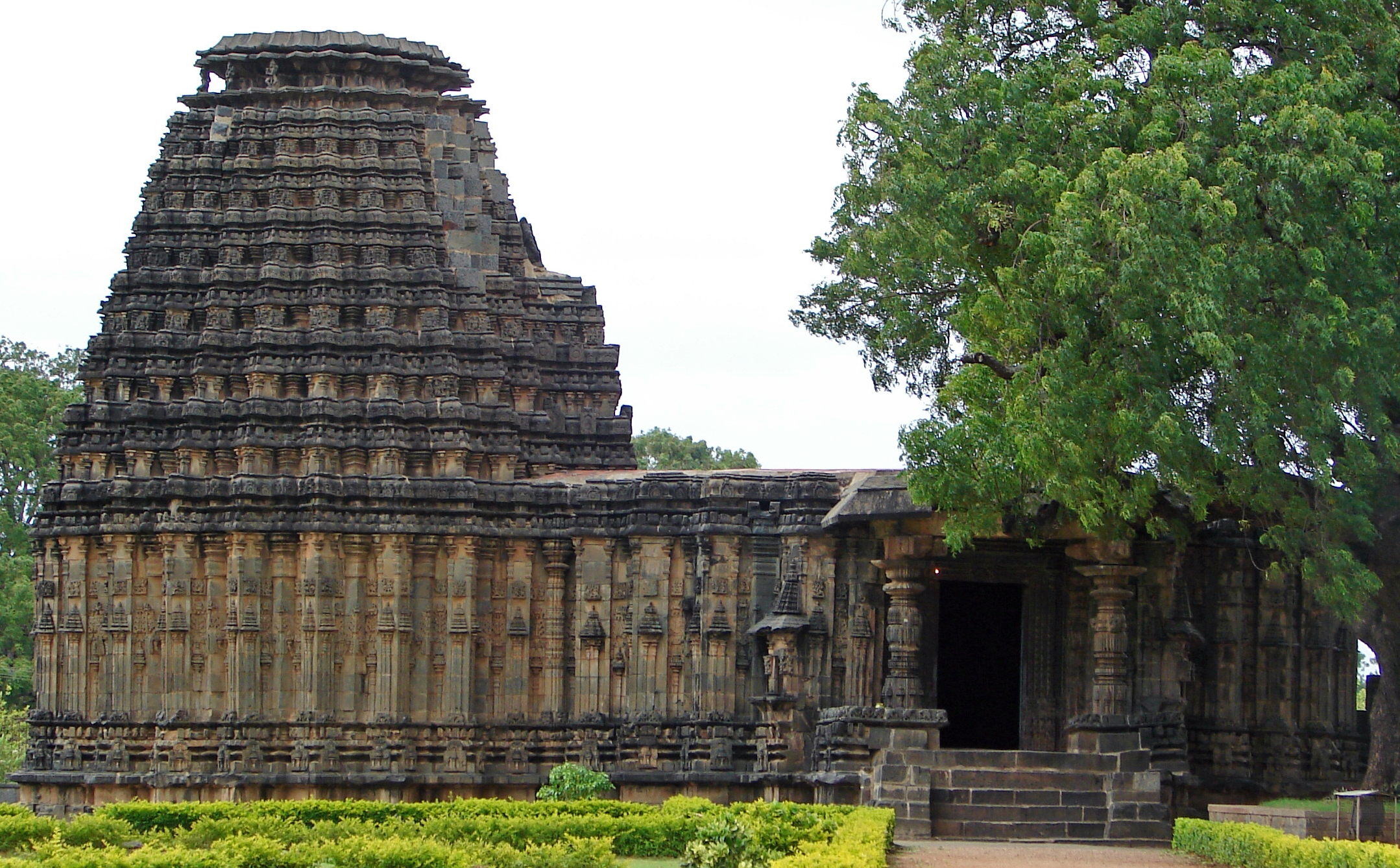
Dodda Basappa Temple at Dambal, a unique 24-pointed, uninterrupted stellate (star-shaped), 7-tiered dravida plan, 12th century

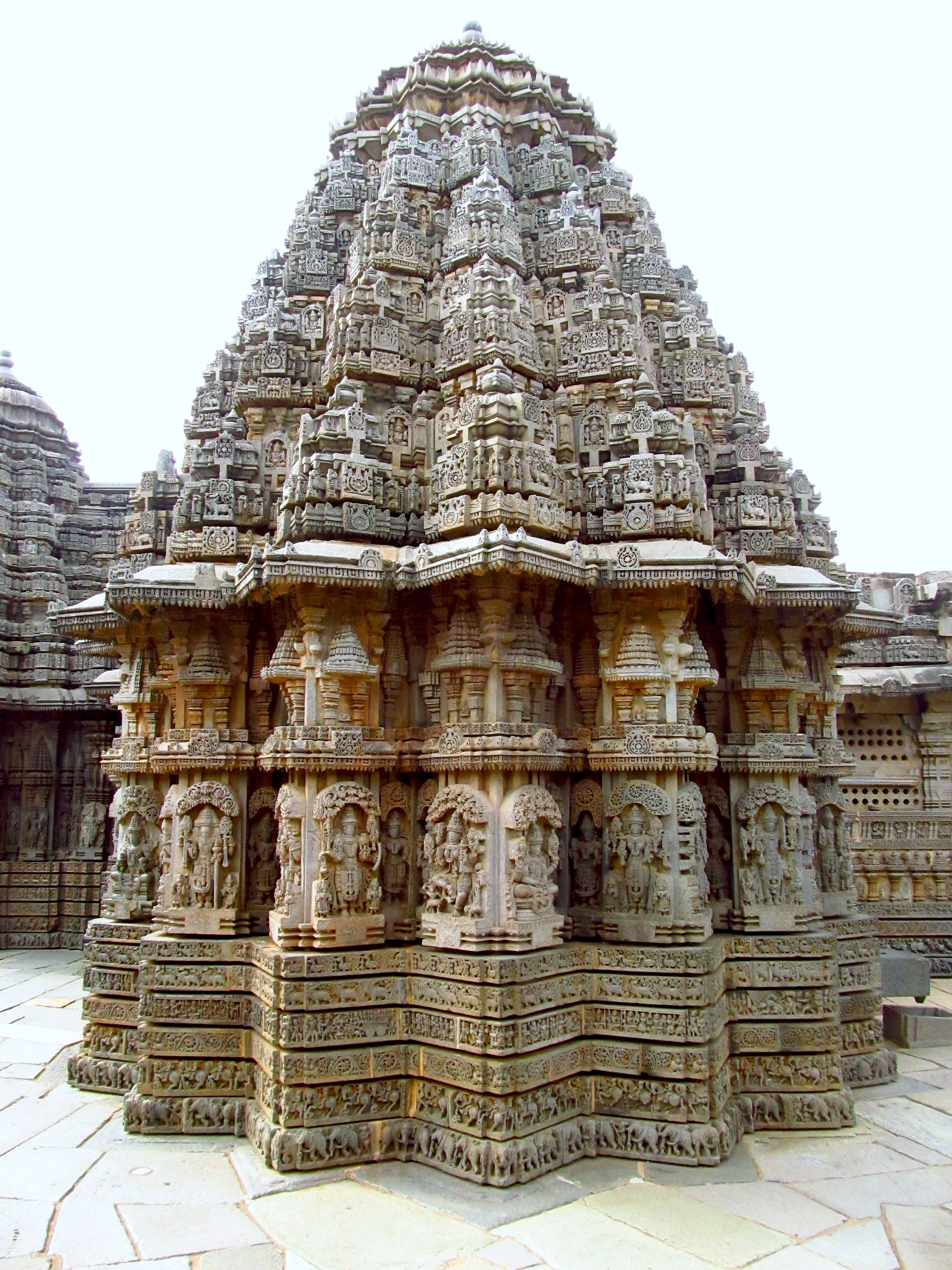
Chennakesava Temple, Somanathapura, 1258

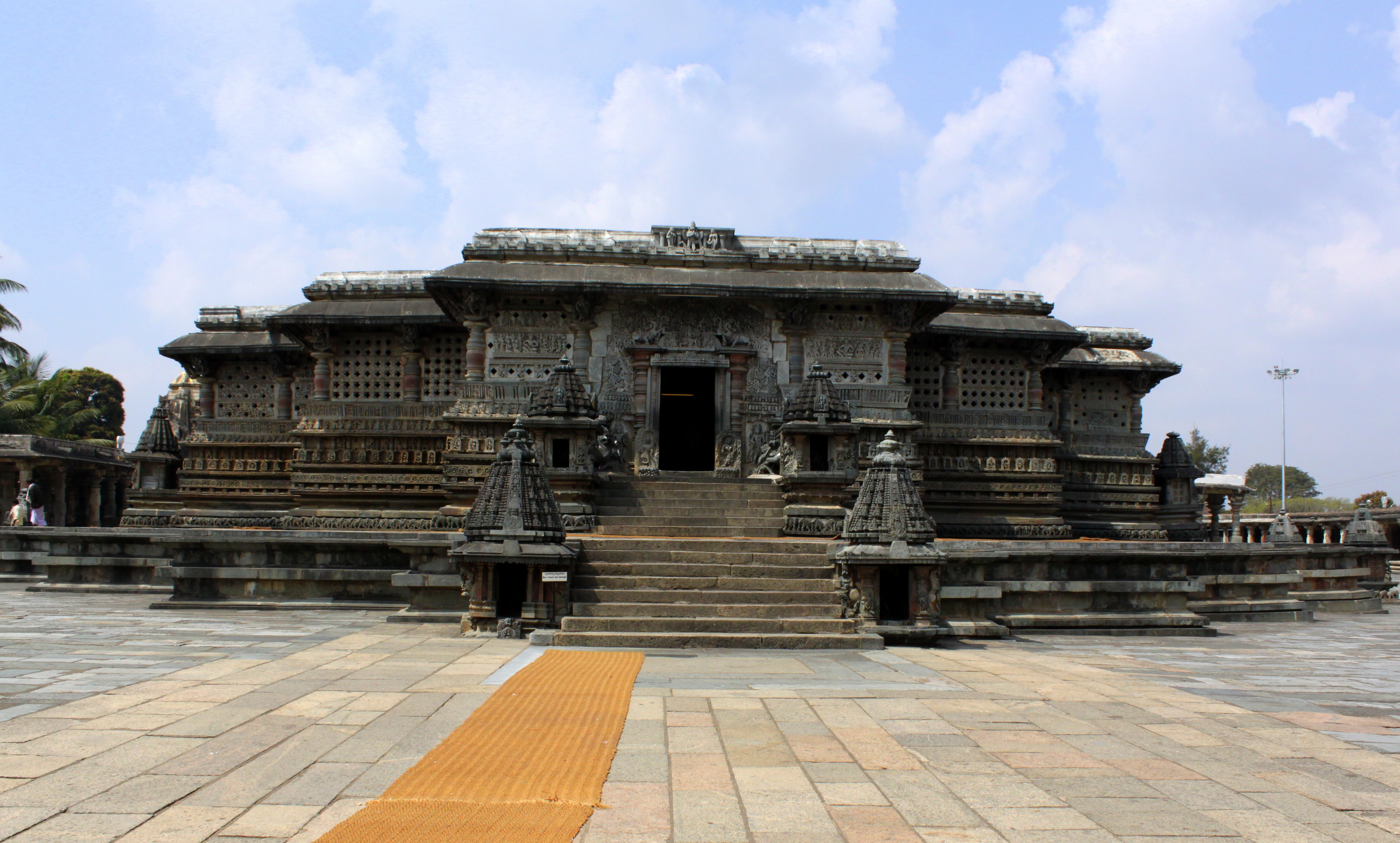
The Kesava shrine at the Chennakeshava Temple, Belur
