= Badami Chalukya architecture =

Style in Hindu temple architecture

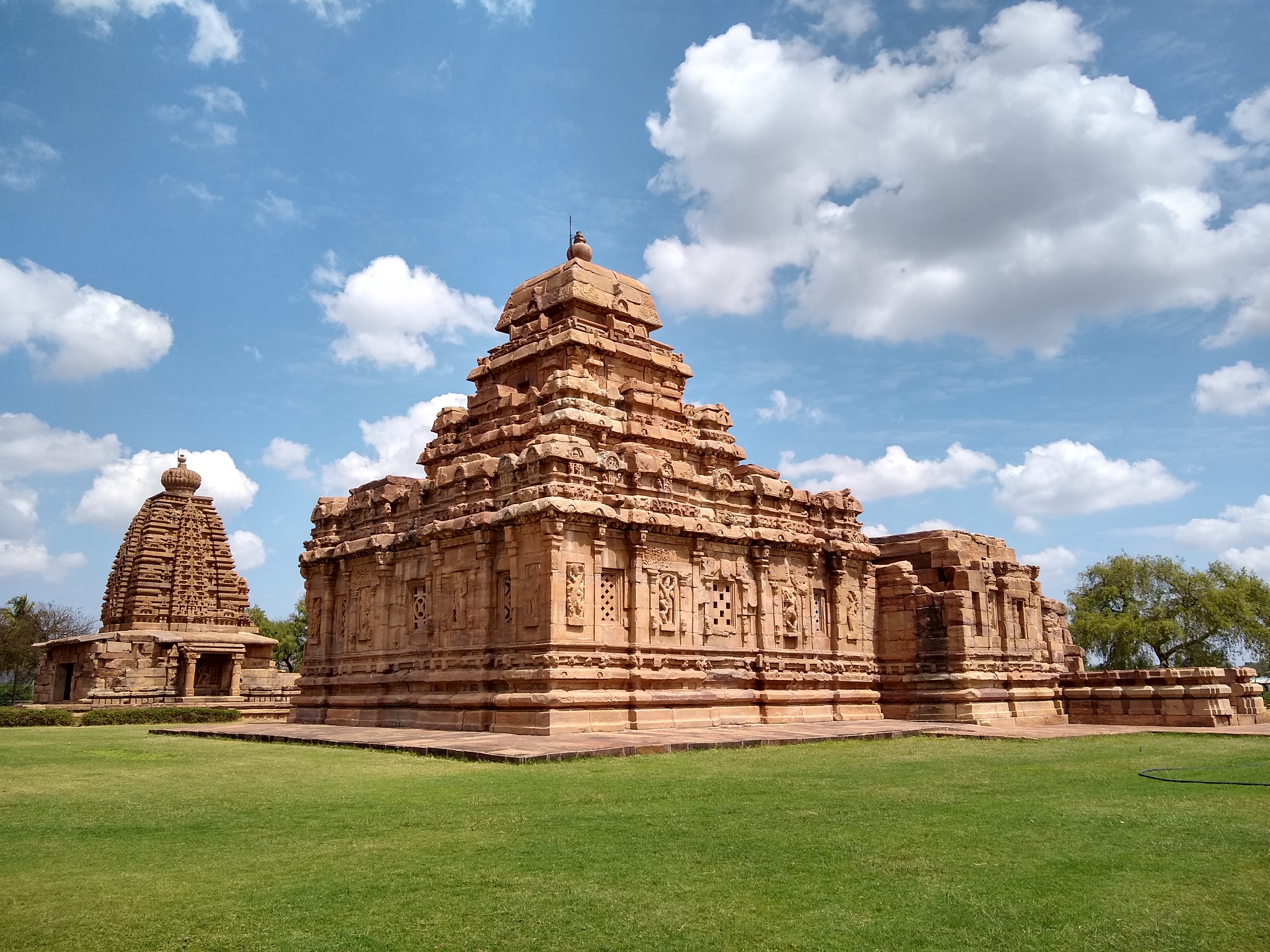
Sangameshvara temple, Pattadakal built in 725

Badami Chalukya architecture is a style in Hindu temple architecture that evolved in the 5th – 8th centuries CE in the Malaprabha river basin, in the present-day Bagalkot district of Karnataka state of India, under the Chalukya dynasty; later it spread more widely. This style is sometimes called the Vesara style and Chalukya style, a term that also includes the much later Western Chalukya architecture of the 11th and 12th centuries. Early Chalukya architecture, used by George Michell and others, equates to Badami Chalukya.

The earliest Badami Chalukya temples date back to around 450 in Aihole when the Badami Chalukyas were vassals of the Kadambas of Banavasi. The Early Chalukya style was perfected in Badami and Pattadakal, both in Karnataka.

The unknown architects and artists experimented with different styles, blended the Nagara and Dravidian styles. The style includes two types of monuments: rock cut halls or "cave temples", and "structural" temples, built above ground.

== Badami cave temples ==
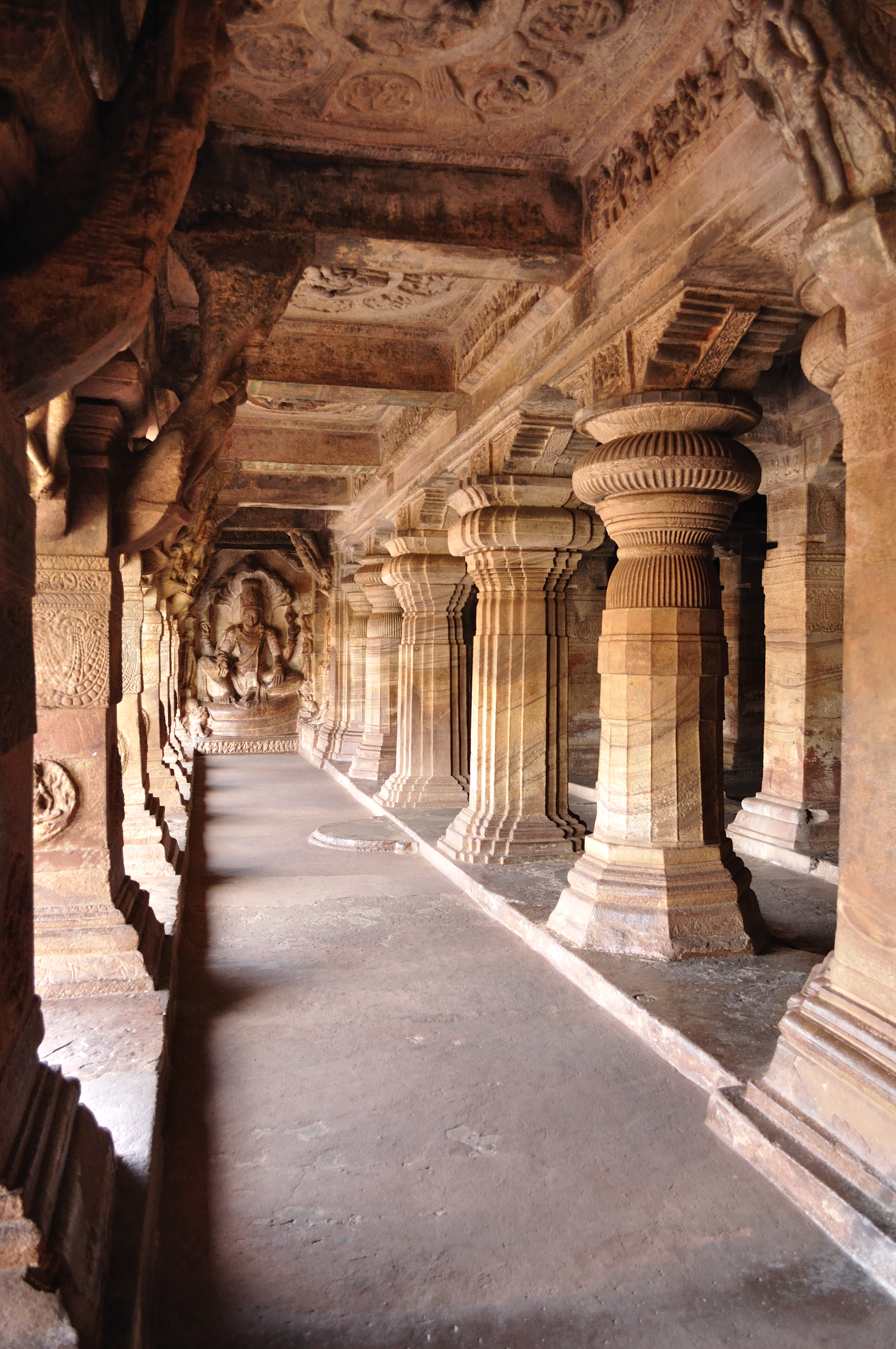
Cave temple at Badami Karnataka

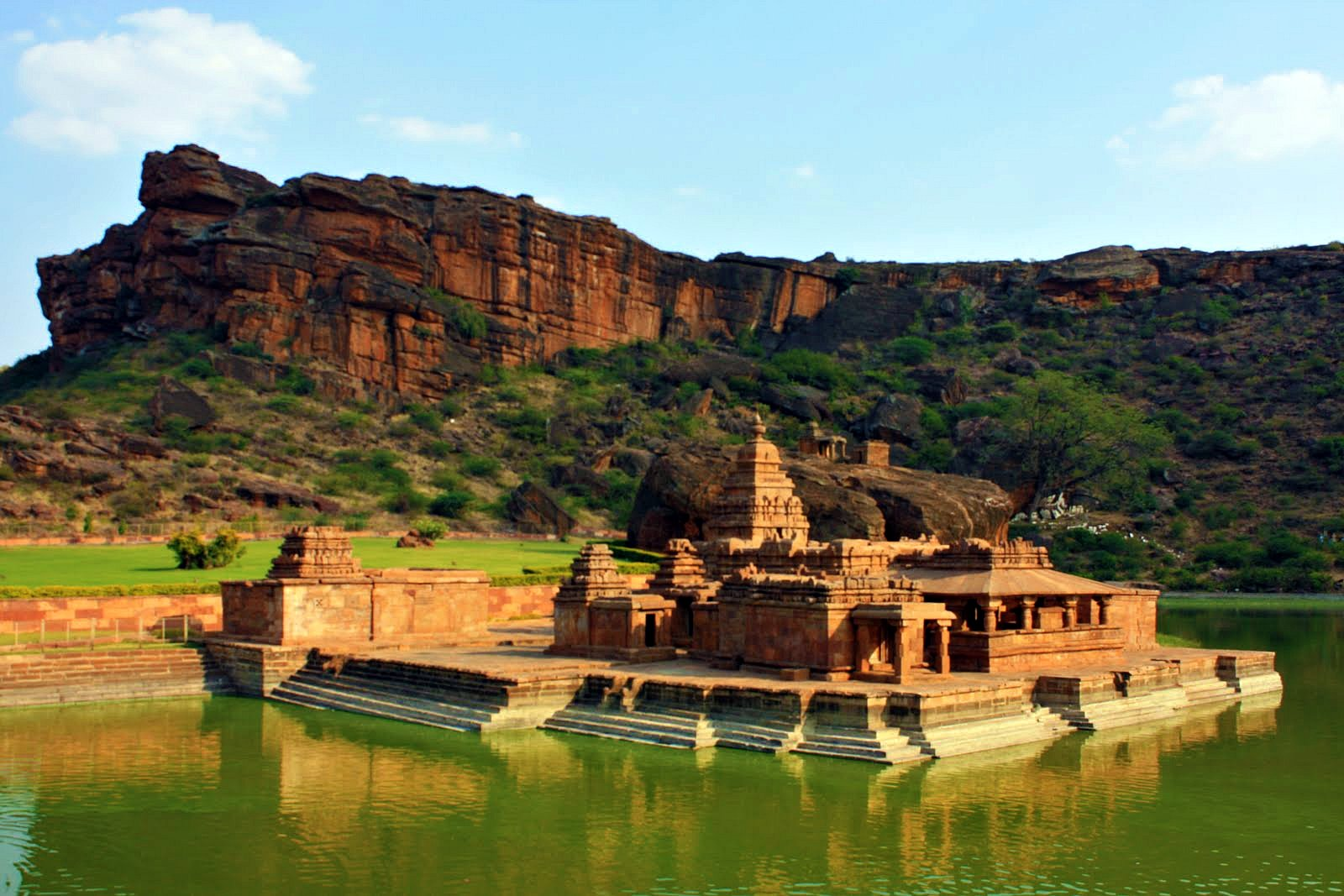
Bhutanatha temple complex

Badami cave temples have rock-cut halls with three basic features: pillared veranda, columned hall and a sanctum cut out deep into rock.

Early experiments in rock-cut halls were attempted in Aihole where they built three cave temples, one each in Vedic, Buddhist and Jaina styles. Later they refined their style and cut out four marvellous cave temples at Badami. One noteworthy feature of these cave temples is the running frieze of Ganas in various amusing postures caved in relief on each plinth.

The outside verandas of the cave temples are rather plain, but the inner hall contains rich and prolific sculptural symbolism. Art critic Dr. M. Sheshadri wrote of the Chalukya art that they cut rock like Titans but finished like jewellers. Critic Zimmer wrote that the Chalukya cave temples are a fine balance of versatility and restrain.

The finest structural temples are located in Pattadakal. Of the ten temples in Pattadakal, six are in Dravidian style and four in Rekhanagara style. The Virupaksha temple in many ways holds resemblance to the Kailasanatha temple in Kanchipuram which came into existence a few years earlier.

This is a fully inclusive temple, it has a central structure, nandi pavilion in front and has a walled enclosure that is entered by a gateway. The main sanctum has a Pradakshinapatha and mantapa. The mantapa is pillared and has perforated windows (pierced window screens). The external wall surface is divided by pilasters into well-spaced ornamental niches filled with either sculptures or perforated windows. Art critic Percy Brown says about the sculptures that they flow into the architecture in a continuous stream. It is said that the Virupaskha temple is one of those monuments where the spirit of the men who built it, still lives.

Many centuries later, the serene art of the Badami Chalukya reappeared in the pillared architecture of the Vijayanagar Empire. Their caves include finely engraved sculptures of Harihara, Trivikrama, Mahisa Mardhini, Tandavamurthi, Paravasudeva, Nataraja, Varaha, Gomateshvara and others. Plenty of animal and foliage motifs are also included.

Some important sculptors of their time were Gundan Anivaritachari, Revadi Ovajja and Narasobba.

=== Important Badami Chalukya temples ===
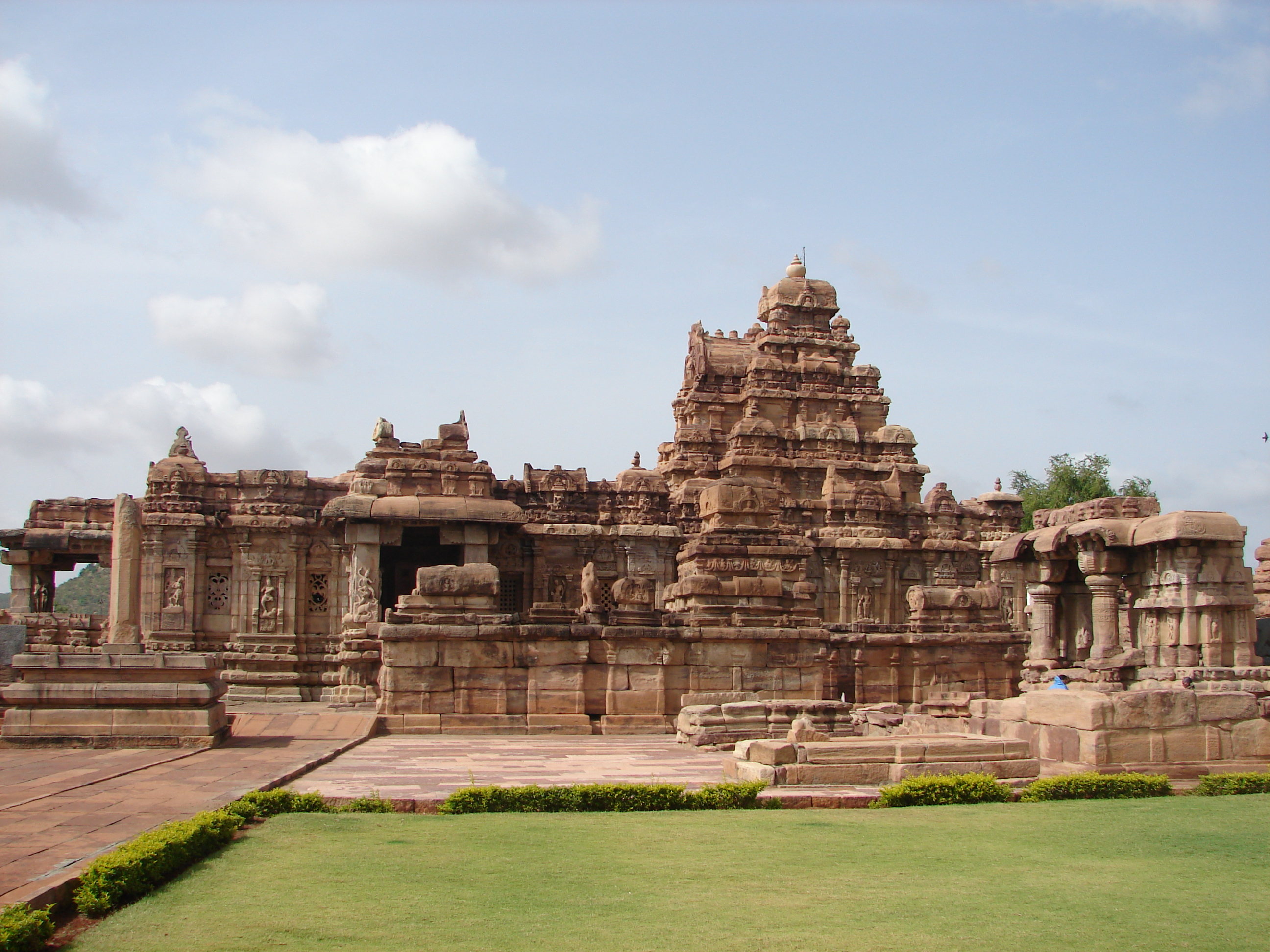
Virupaksha temple at Pattadakal

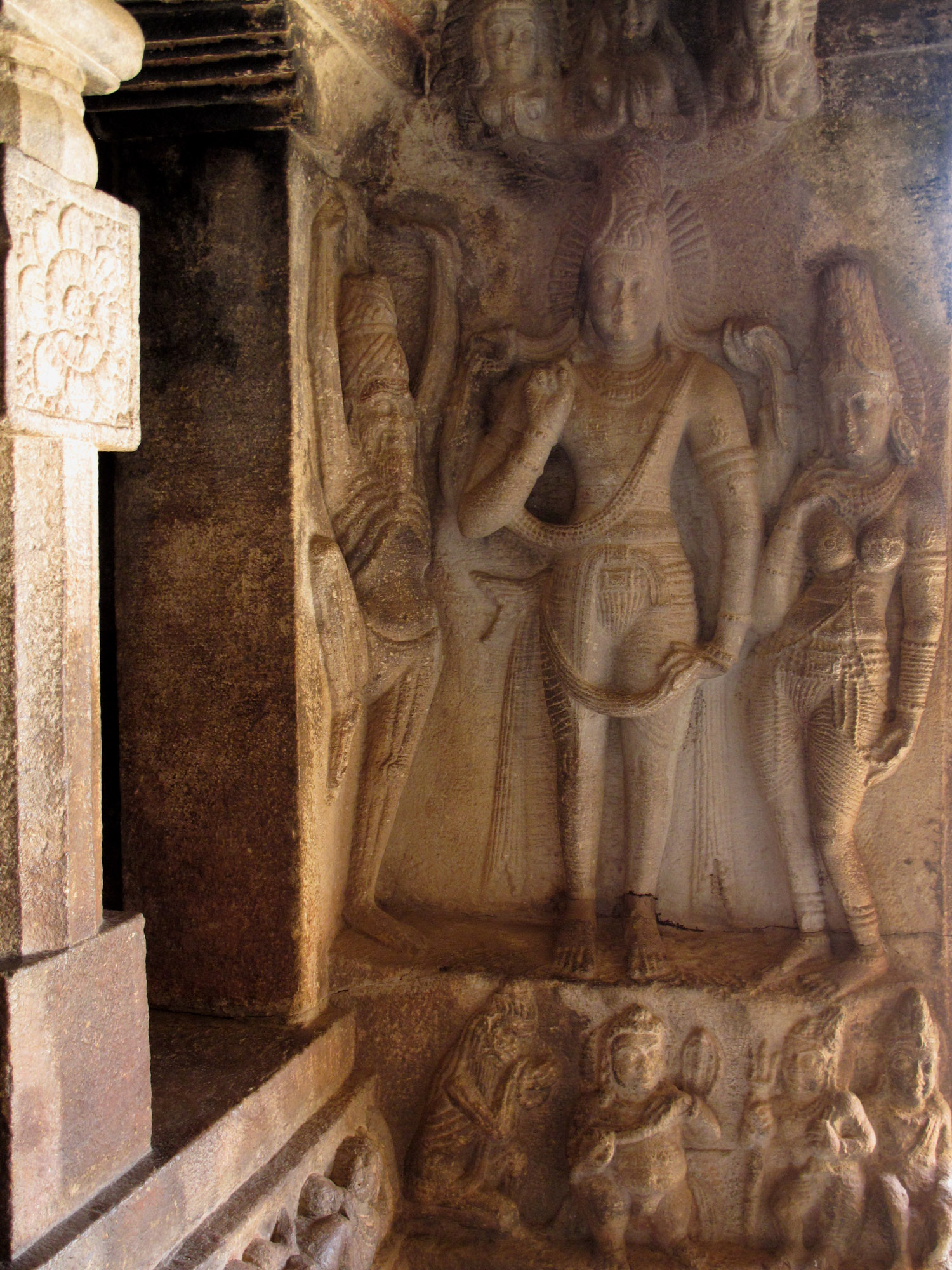
Ravana Phadi cave, Aihole

Pattadakal

- Virupaksha Temple
- Sangameswarar Temple
- Kashivisvanatha Temple (Rashtrakuta)
- Mallikarjuna Temple
- Galganatha Temple
- Kadasiddeshvara Temple
- Jambulinga Temple
- Jain Narayana Temple (Rashtrakuta)
- Papanatha Temple
- Museum of the Plains and Sculpture gallery
- Naganatha Temple
- Chandrashekara
- Mahakuteshwara Temple
- Sun Temple

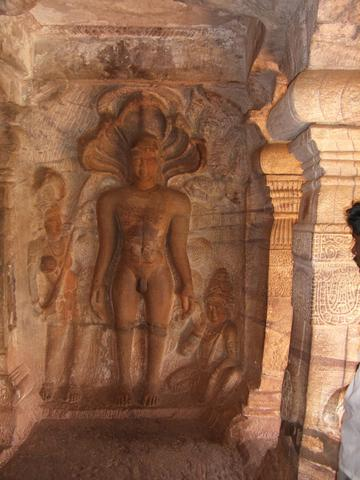
Jain tirthankara Parshvanath, cave No. 4, Badami cave temples

Aihole

- Durga Temple
- Meguti Jain Temple
- Jain cave (Mena Basti)
- Lad Khan Temple
- Huchiappayyagudi Temple
- Huchiappayya math
- Ravanaphadi Temple
- Gowda Temple
- Museum & Art Gallery
- Suryanarayana Temple

Badami

- Cave 1 (Shiva)
- Cave 2 (Vishnu as Trivikrama or Vamana, Varaha and Krishna)
- Cave 3 (Vishnu as Narasimha, Varaha, Harihara and Trivikrama.)
- Cave 4 (Jain Tirthankara Parsvanatha)
- Bhutanatha group of temples (Badami and Kalyani Chalukya)

Gerusoppa

- Vardhamanaswamy Temple

Sanduru

- Parvati temple

Alampur, Andhra Pradesh

- Navabrahma temples
- Kudavelly Sangameshwara Temple

== Notes ==
- Nilakanta Sastri, K.A. (1955). A History of South India, From Prehistoric times to fall of Vijayanagar, OUP, New Delhi (Reprinted 2002).
- Dr. Suryanath U. Kamat (2001). Concise History of Karnataka, MCC, Bangalore (Reprinted 2002).
- History Of Karnataka, Mr. Arthikaje © 1998-00 OurKarnataka.com
