= Chalukya Shiva Temple =

Hindu temple in Karnataka, India

- Chalukya Shiva Temple
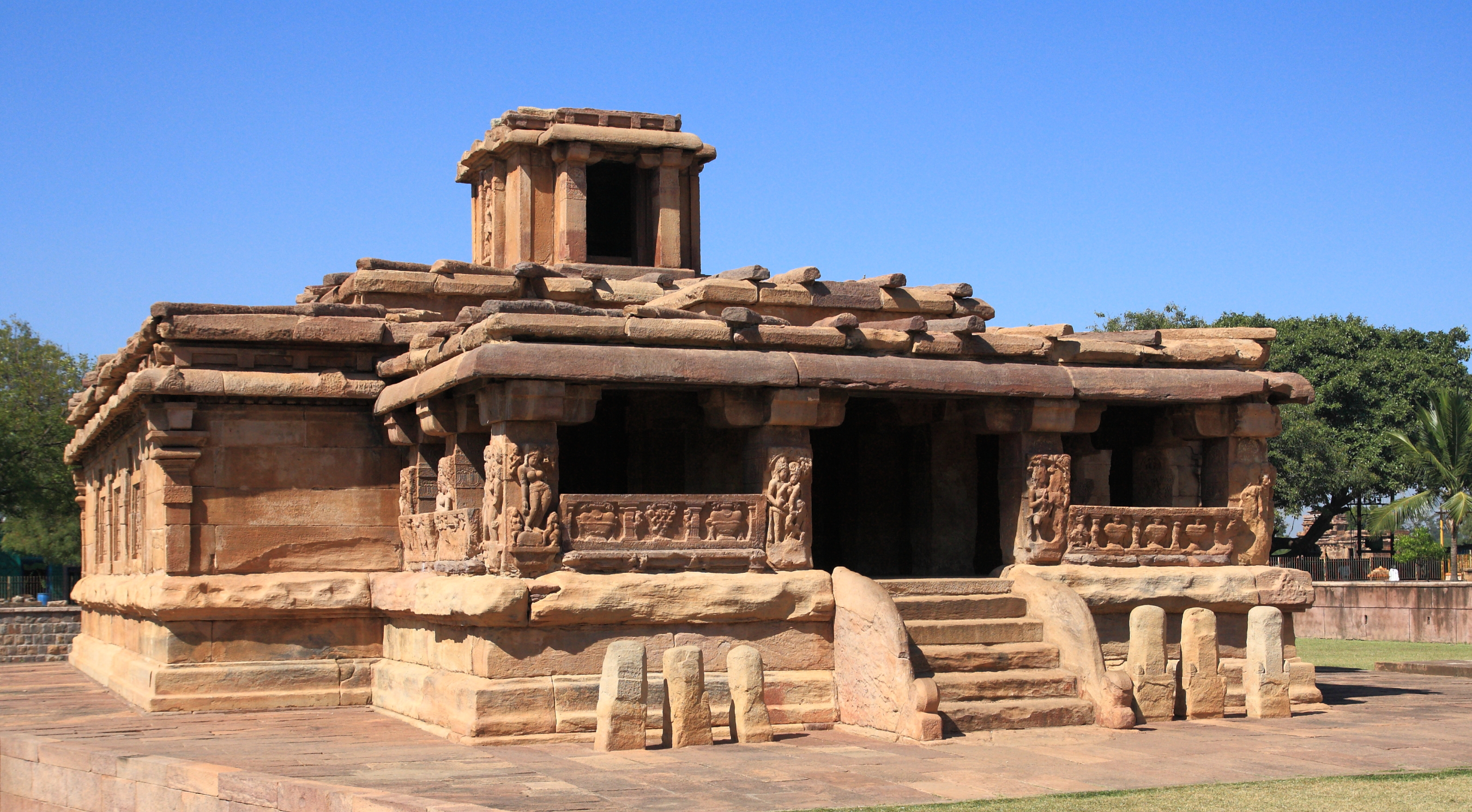

- Location in Karnataka

Religion
- Affiliation: Hinduism
- District: Bagalkot
- Deity: Shiva

Location
- Location: Aihole
- State: Karnataka
- Country: India
- Coordinates: 16°1′11.68″N 75°52′52.46″E

Architecture
- Creator: Chalukya dynasty
- Completed: 6th century

The Chalukya Shiva Temple, also known as Lad Khan Temple, dedicated to Shiva, is one of the oldest Hindu temples and is located in the group of monuments at Aihole in the state of Karnataka, India. Formerly dated to the 7th or 8th century, it is now dated to about the 5th century. It is located to the south of the Durga temple, Aihole.

== Structure ==
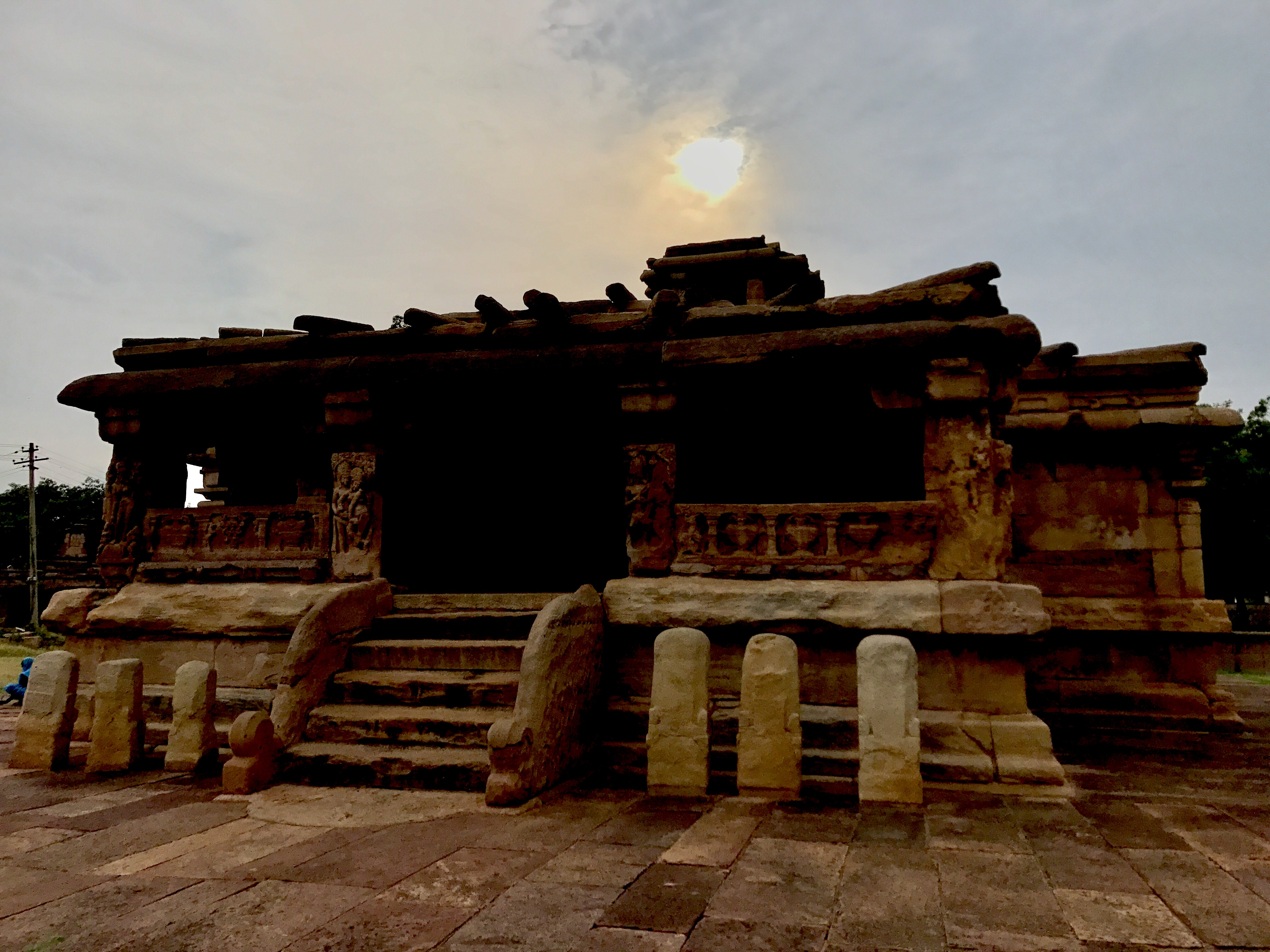
Chalukya Shiva temple during sunset

The temple shows clear signs of following early timber models, none of which have survived. This is seen for example in the construction of the roof of the mandapa. The temple consists of a shrine (garba griha) with a mandapa in front of it, and a covered path for circumambulating the sanctuary, seen in other very early temples. The mukha mandapa is situated in front of the sanctum and consists of a set of 12 carved pillars. The sabha mandapa leads to the maha mandapa and the pillars are arranged to form two concentric squares. The walls have floral patterns on them and the windows have lattice work done in the northern style. Facing the sanctum, a second smaller sanctum is situated above the center of the hall whose outer walls have many carved images.

Originally dedicated to Vishnu, now the main shrine houses a Shiva Linga with a Nandi. The temple was built in a Panchayatana style, indicating a very early experiment in temple construction. The special feature of this temple is that it starts with a rectangular structure and ends with a square structure. Based on a wooden construction design, the square and rectangular plan has a steep roof, which is an adaptation of wooden styles in stone.

The maha mandapa is open to exterior by large windows between the pillars. The roof above the maha mandapa shows a turret as a first version of the future forms of tower: shikharas in north India and vimanas in the south.

== Name ==
The temple is also referred to as Lad Khan Temple, named after a person named Lad khan, who turned this temple into his residence for a short period and this is the oldest temple of Aihole.
