= Durga temple, Aihole =

8th-century Hindu temple in Aihole, Karnataka, India

Durga temple
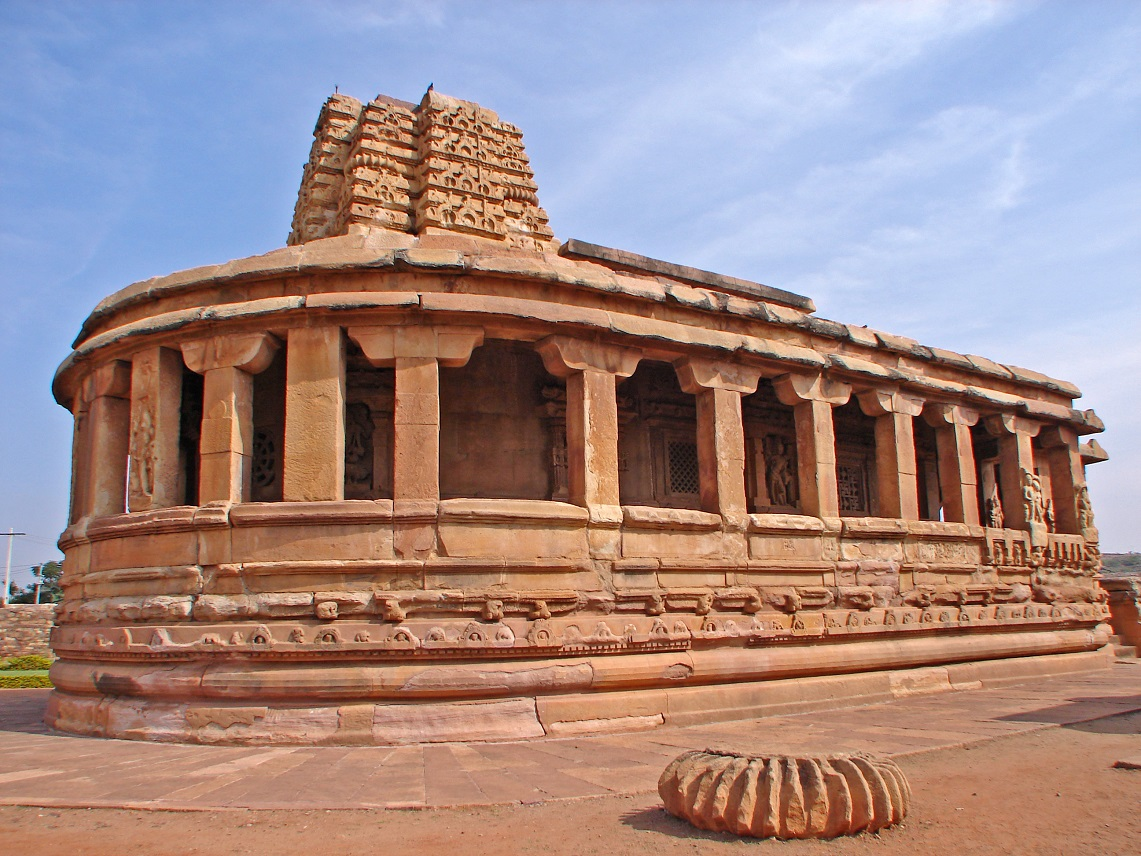

- Location in Karnataka Durga temple, Aihole (Karnataka)

Religion
- Affiliation: Hinduism
- District: Bagalkot

Location
- Location: Aihole
- State: Karnataka
- Country: India
- Interactive map of Durga temple
- Coordinates: 16°1′14.4″N 75°52′55″E

Architecture
- Creator: Chalukya dynasty
- Completed: late 7th - early 8th century

The Durga temple is an early 8th-century Hindu temple located in Aihole, Karnataka, India. Originally dedicated to Sūrya, it has the most embellished and largest relief panels in Aihole depicting artwork of Shaivism, Vaishnavism, Shaktism and Vedic deities. Apart from its fine carvings, it is notable for its apsidal plan – a rare example among early Chalukya architecture.

Though dedicated to Surya, the temple is now named Durga because a durg or fortified lookout was constructed on top of it after the 13th century during the wars between Hindu kingdoms and Islamic Sultanates. This rubble lookout survived through the 19th century when this site was rediscovered (it is now gone, temple has been restored). The Durga temple is the most prominent attraction in Aihole for tourist and scholars. It is a part of a pending UNESCO World Heritage Site application.

== Date ==
The temple has been dated between the late 7th century and the early 8th century of the early Chalukya dynasty. According to Dhaky and Meister – scholars of Indian temple architecture, an inscription discovered in the 1970s confirms that this temple was originally dedicated to Surya, built by someone named Kumara, but does not include a date. On paleographic grounds, the inscription cannot be later than c. 700 CE. (Note: The Durga temple of Aihole has quite a few short inscriptions as well, which has caused some confusion and some early speculations that has been discarded. For example, one short inscription reads "Jinalayan". This led early speculations that this was a Jain temple with Hindu deities, or a Jain temple that was converted into a Hindu temple. But, with no evidence of anything Jaina, nor any signs of re-carving in the numerous artwork panels here, the "Jinalayan" is treated as the name of one of the artists or architects who worked on this temple. Such signatures are common in Badami Chalukyan temples.)

=== Historiography ===
The Durga temple at Aihole has been a subject of much debate and several wrong theories since it discovery. Gary Tartakov, a scholar of Architecture and Archaeology, has published a lengthy and detailed historiographic review of how it has baffled scholars, been misidentified and how some have wrongly accused early Hindus of appropriating a temple that did not belong to them.

The ruins of Durga temple were re-discovered by Briggs – a British artillery officer in early 1860s. Briggs sensed the significance of its art and structure, took the earliest photographs and published them as "Shivite temple in Iwullee". Shortly thereafter, James Fergusson announced it was "a Buddhist monument" because of its apsidal shape. Fergusson further speculated that it is an example of "inglorious, structural version of a Buddhist caitya hall" that was "appropriated by Brahmanical Hindus". Thus began the long presumed exclusive association of apsidal plan architecture as Buddhist. As other scholars visited and examined other evidence such as the extensive reliefs and panels, the understanding and theories about the Durga temple evolved. James Burgess posited that this must have been a Vishnu temple from the start, as there was no evidence of any Buddhist temple or of appropriation by the Hindus. Henry Cousens was the first to link to it Surya, but through Surya-Narayana (Vishnu). As the Aihole site was further explored, excavated, more thoroughly cleaned up and restored in the 1960s and 1970s, new inscriptions were among the discoveries. In particular, in the cleaned sections of the Durga temple in the 1970s, a new inscription, from c. 700 CE, was found. It was accurately translated by K.V. Ramesh in 1976, later by Srinivas Padigar. This inscription confirmed that the temple was built by Kumara for Hindu deity Aditya (Surya).

According to Tartakov's detailed review of the Durga temple, the inertia of the historic interpretations and the repetition of "stereotyped information" from colonial era scholarship has perpetuated the misunderstandings. According to Sinha – a scholar of Indian architecture and history, instead of the evidence and science on the Durga temple, the original orientalist framework has continued its influence on the Indian authors. Tartakov states that the writing of history of Durga temple as Buddhist or Buddhist-inspired has become a folklore and received truth, no matter what the evidence in the temple and the site says.

According to some scholars such as George Michell, writing before Tartakov's book was published, this 8th-century temple plan derives from rock-cut chaitya hall tradition that existed about a 1000 years earlier in 2nd to 1st-century BCE Buddhist caves. This view has been contested by other scholars who have published their studies after the publication of the Tartakov's book. For example, Himanshu Prabha Ray questions the process of continuity over the ten centuries gap, quotes earliest Sanskrit texts on temple architecture and archaeological discoveries of ancient and medieval apsidal Hindu temples in many states of India.

According to Philip Harding, Durga temple takes the "form of an apsidal temple with inner and outer ambulatories — a form early researchers considered a derivative of Buddhist chaitya halls, but is now generally recognized as a traditional Brahmanical form".

== Description ==
=== Architecture ===
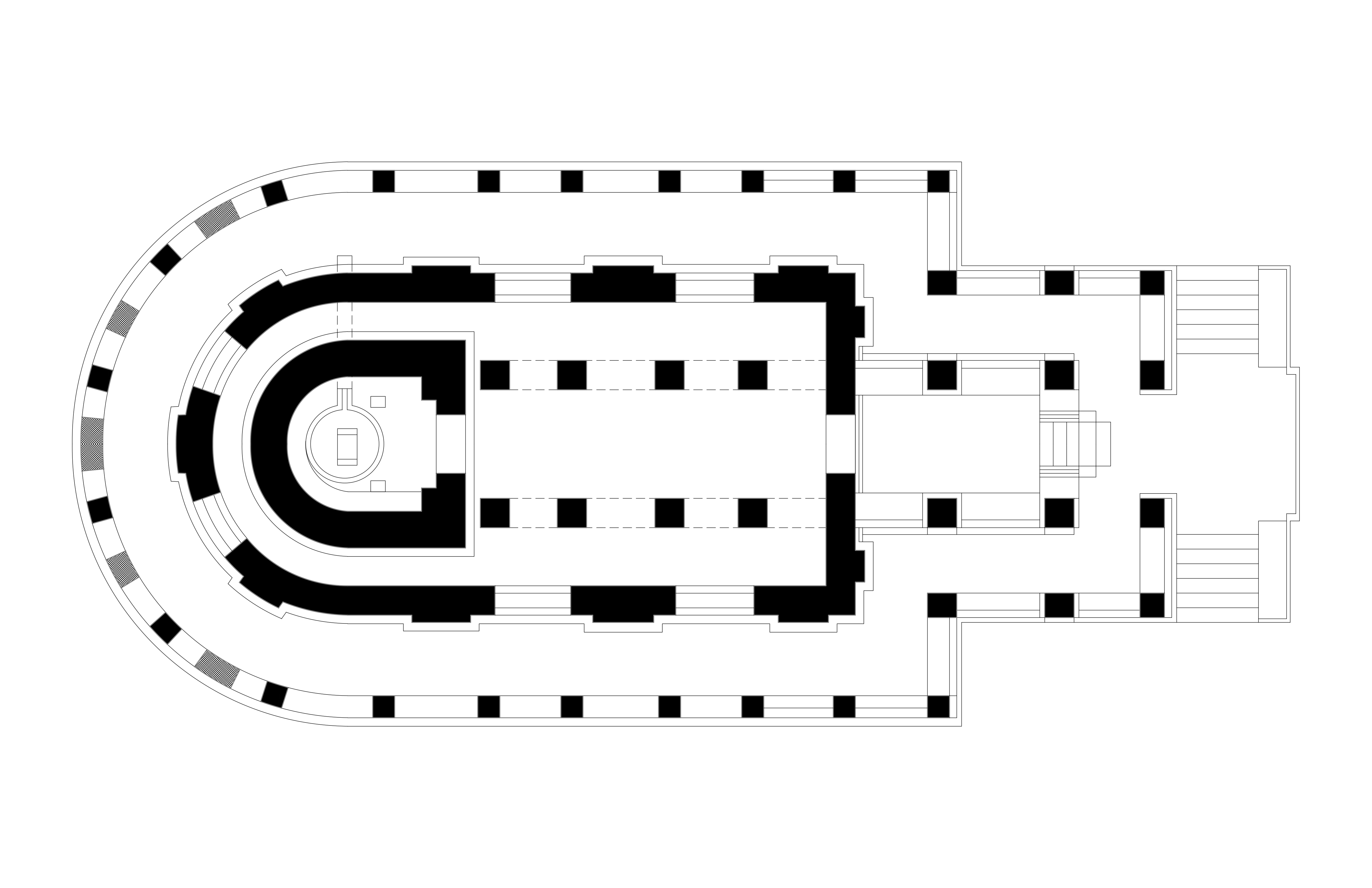
Floor plan of the Durga temple, Aihole (Note: According to Philip Harding, this plan has geometric proportions embedded in it, one that integrates with the doorway near this temple. He also elaborates how the architect may have constructed the temple using principles of geometry and late 7th-century tools.)

The Durga temple has an apsidal plan for its sanctum, one that fuses with a square plan for the mandapa. This design seems to have borrowed influences from early apsidal Buddhist Chaitya Caves such as the Karla Chaitya.

It is the largest of a group of over 120 temples at Aihole and illustrates a mature example of the Badami Chalukya architecture. The architecture of the temple is sophisticated as it combines an apsidal plan for the sanctum (garbhagriya) with a non-apsidal Nagara-Latina shikhara with roots in North Indian architecture. In other parts such as the mandapa, it uses a mix of rectangular and square plans, all fronted by a mukhacatuski-style entrance. It integrates an ambulatory passage within. This fusion of north and south Indian ideas on architecture is not disjointed, but one well integrated. For example, the adhisthana is formulated by a Nagara khura-kumbha, and the decoration with it is Dravida.

The most original feature of the temple is a peristyle delimiting an ambulatory around the temple itself and whose walls are covered with sculptures of different gods or goddesses. The rounded ends at the rear or sanctuary end include a total of three layers: the wall of the sanctuary itself, the main temple wall beyond a passageway running behind this, and a pteroma or ambulatory as an open loggia with pillars, running all round the building. Stone grilles with various geometrical openwork patterns ventilate the interior from the ambulatory. The heart of the shrine (garba griha) is surmounted by a tower which announces the future higher towers shikharas and vimanas. The amalaka that once crowned the shikara is on the ground nearby (visible in top picture).

From the front the temple appears much more conventional; two staircases provide access to the porch, with many richly carved relief panels, including roundels with groups of lovers. The sober and square pillars are decorated with characters around the porch and the entrance to the peristyle. The parapet is carved with niches and small animals. The porch gives access to rooms with pillars ('mukhamantapa' and "sabhamantapa") to get into the sanctuary, the heart of the shrine (garba griha). The sanctum is empty.

=== Artwork ===
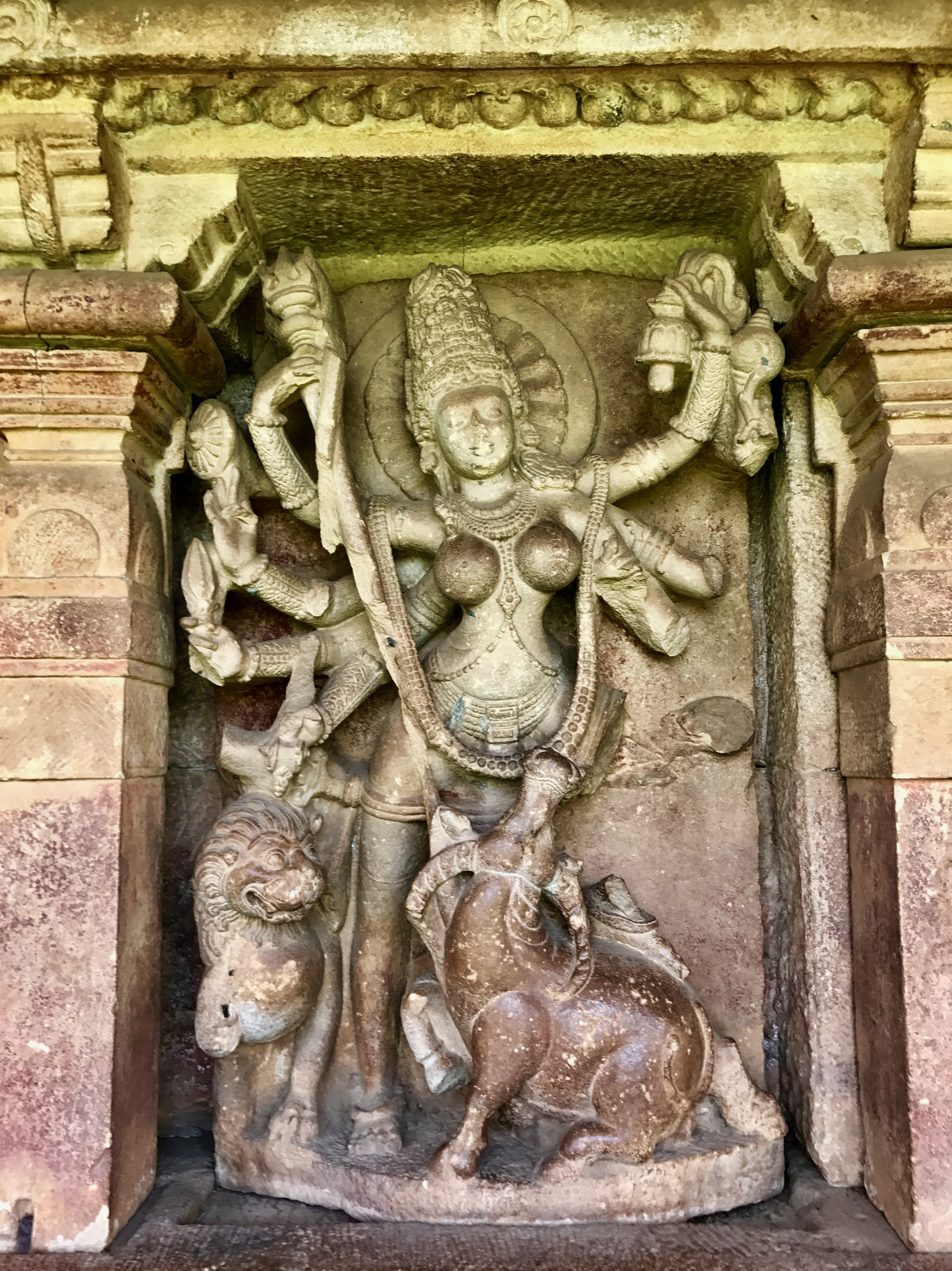
Goddess Durga as Mahishasuramardini.

Parts of the Durga temple have been damaged, including the artwork it had originally. Some panels are missing, for others the iconography helps identify the identity of the deity or depicted theme. The major artworks are found on the entrance pillars, mukhamandapa pillars, first two bays of the ambulatory and some of the panels around the apsidal ambulatory. The outermost pillars towards the apsidal section are plain.

As the devotee enters the temple, she or he witnesses dvarapalas, along with scenes of artha and kama (mithuna, erotic happy couples) from the everyday life on pillars and pilaster through the mukhamandapa. Below, near the base of the porch and mandapas are smaller panels that contain scenes from the Hindu epic Ramayana.

The gudha-mandapa's doorframe has six shakhas – concentric bands of artwork. These are Naga, Valli, Stambha, Mithuna, Valli and Bahya-style decoration bands. At the base of this doorframe are goddess Ganga and Yamuna, with their traditional attendants. As one gets closer to the sanctum, the artwork shows deities, and legends associated with dharma themes and scenes. The major dharma panels are in the ambulatory passage. These include (along the traditional Hindu-style clockwise circumambulation):

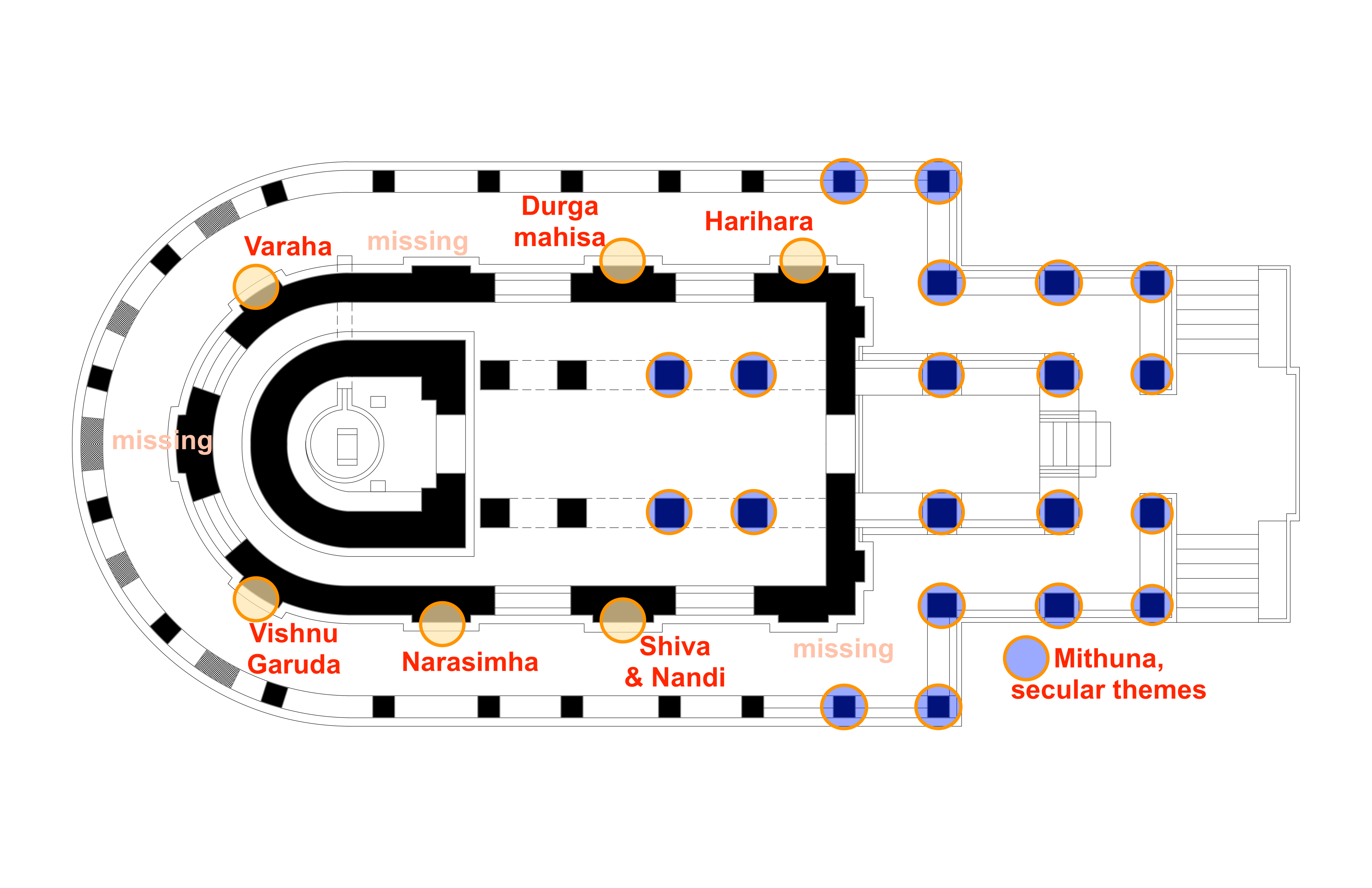
The location of major art works, Durga temple

- missing panel
- Vrishavahana (Shiva with vahana Nandi)
- Narasimha (Man-lion avatar of Vishnu)
- Vishnu with vahana Garuda
- missing panel
- Varaha (boar avatar of Vishnu, the rescued earth is shown as a tiny Bhudevi nuzzling at his tusk)
- missing panel
- Durga as Mahisasuramardini
- Harihara (half-Shiva, half-Vishnu)

According to Dhaky and Meister, some of the "niche figures are of very superior quality".

The ceiling of the Durga temple had carved panels. These were removed and are now a feature item in the National Museum, New Delhi.

== Gallery ==
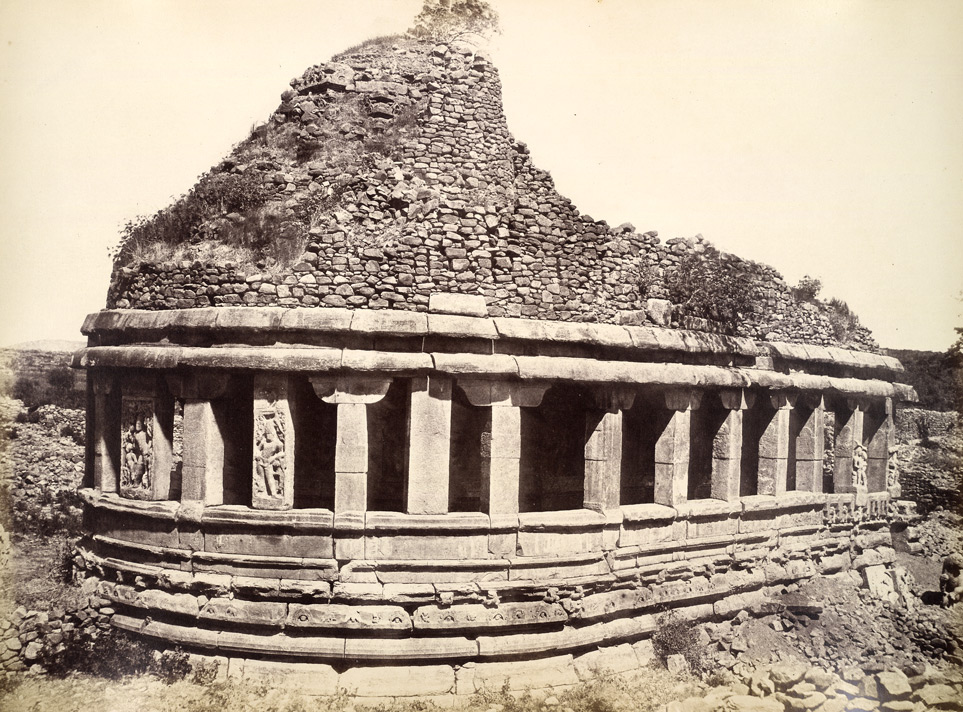
The temple in 1855, when the roof had been used as a fort or look-out post

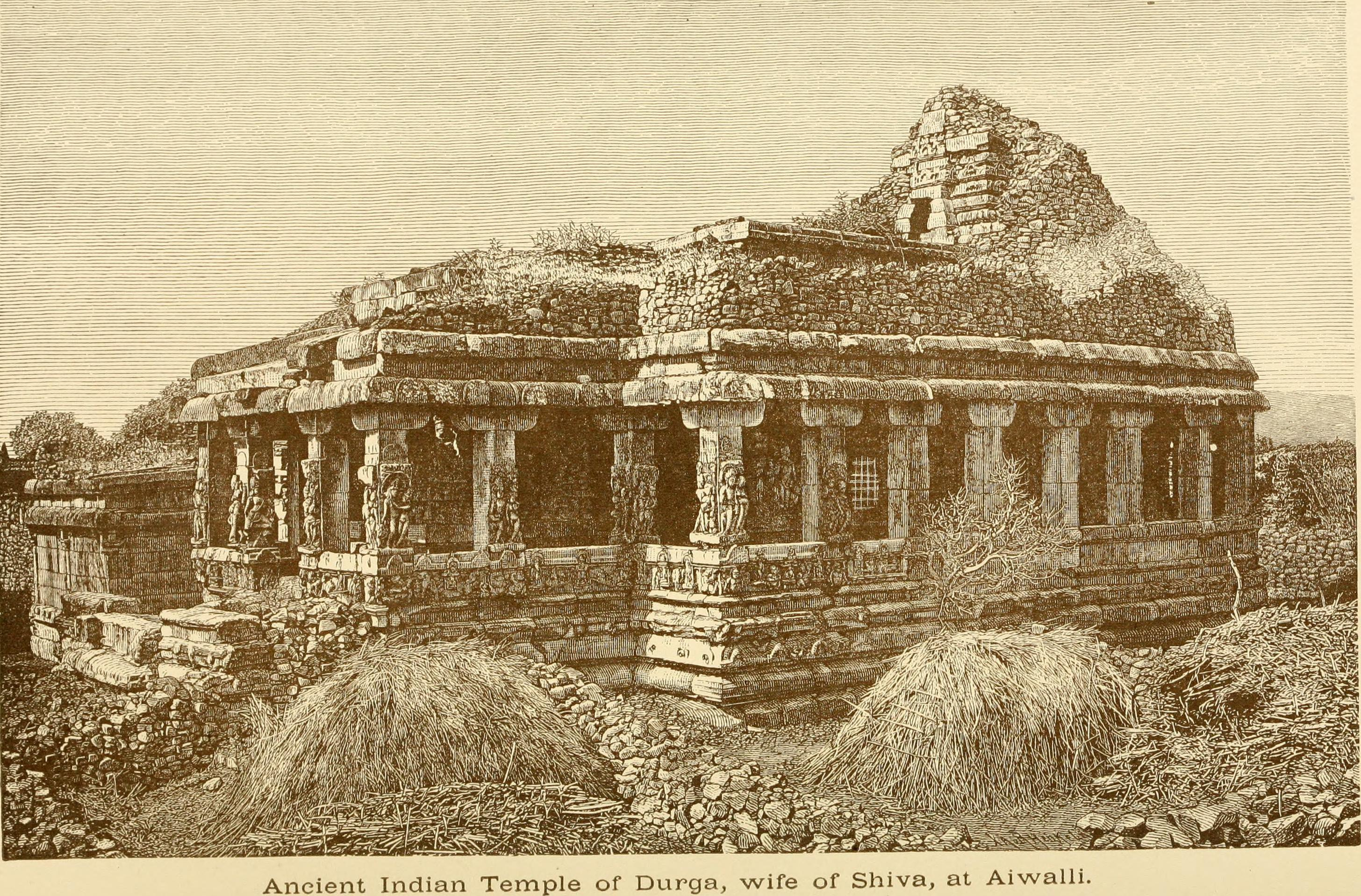
View late-1890s

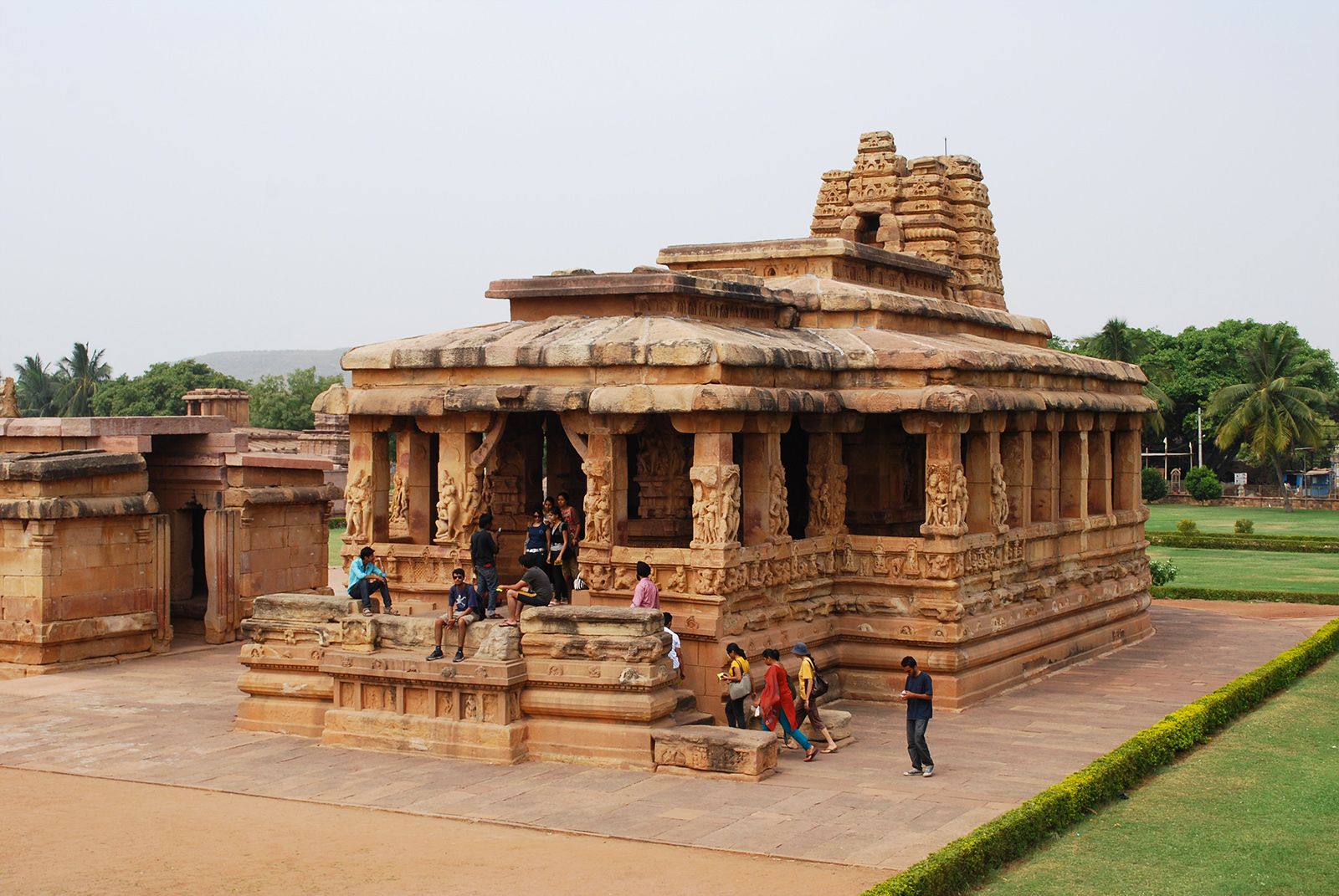
The temple from the front

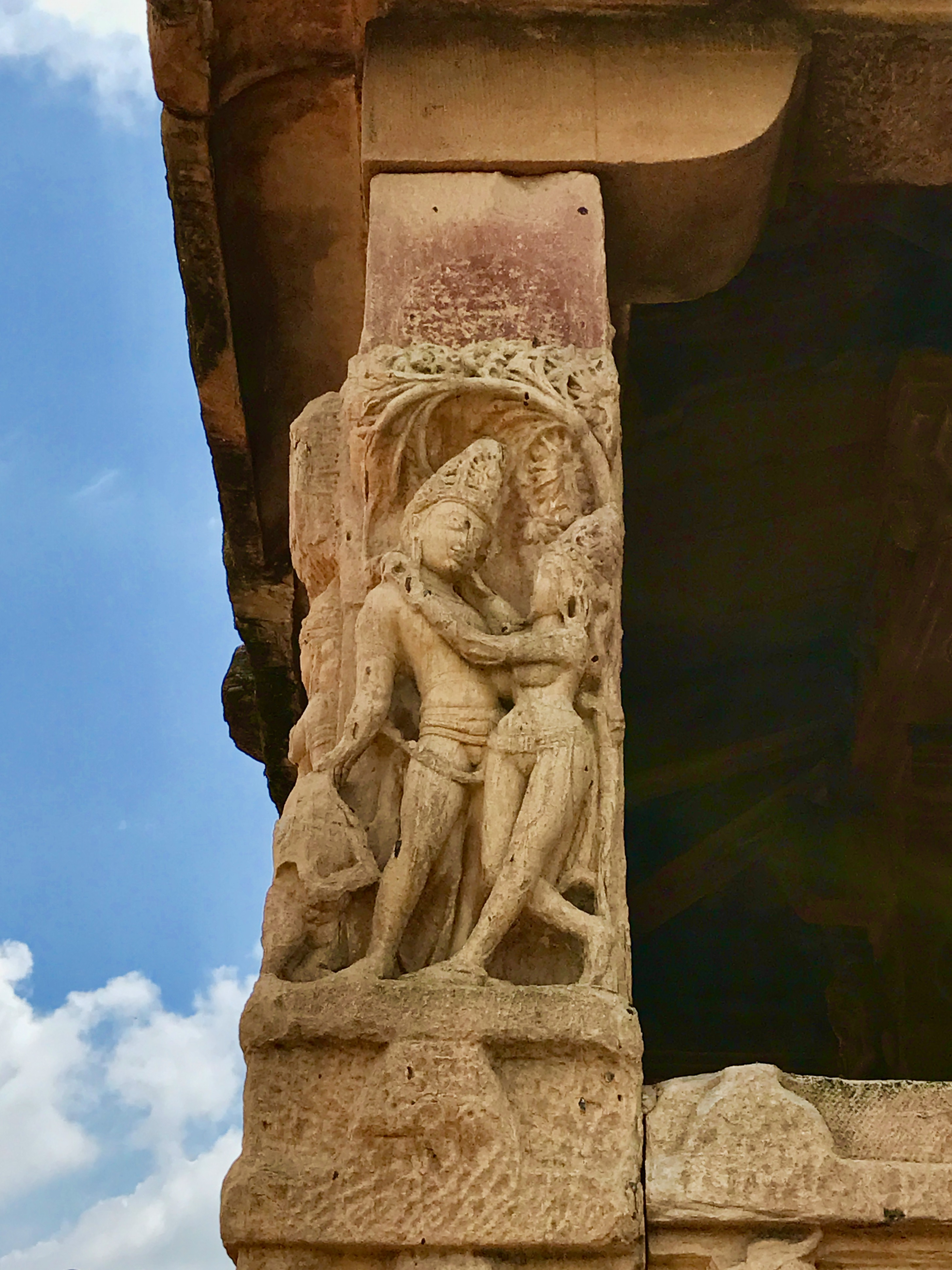
Relief on the exterior

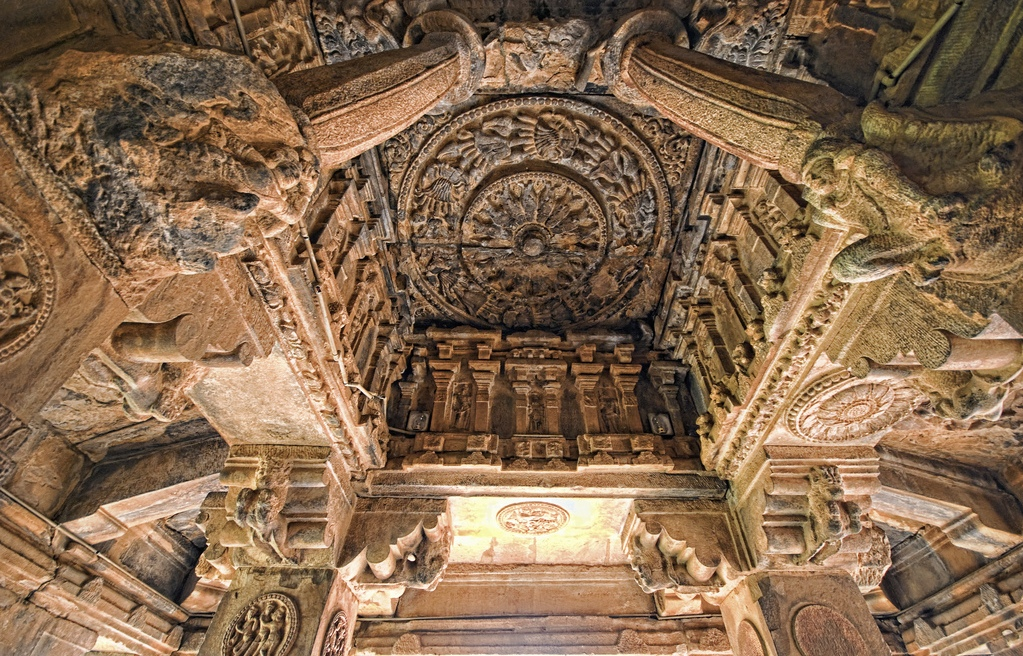
Roof inside

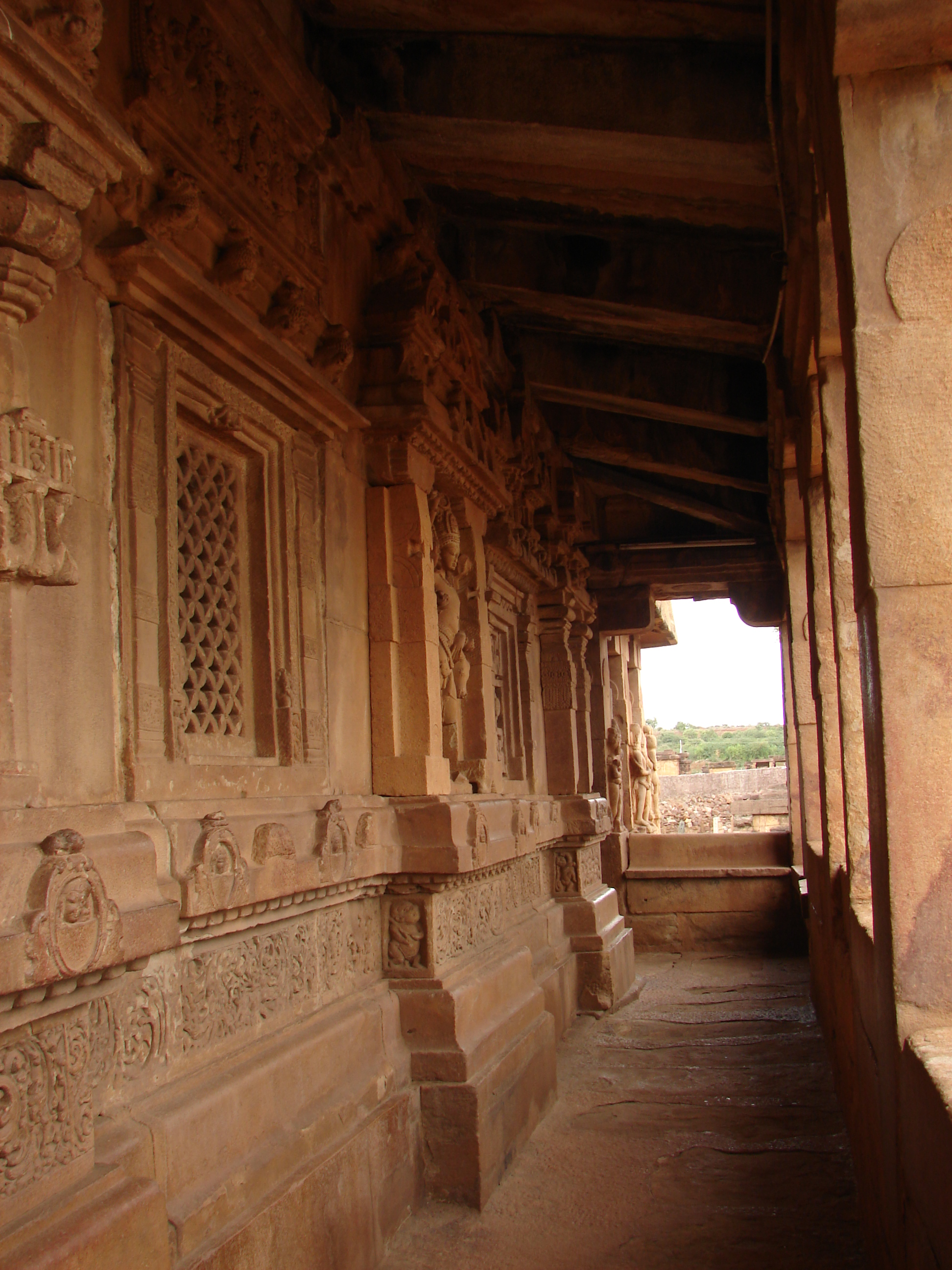
The ambulatory around the temple

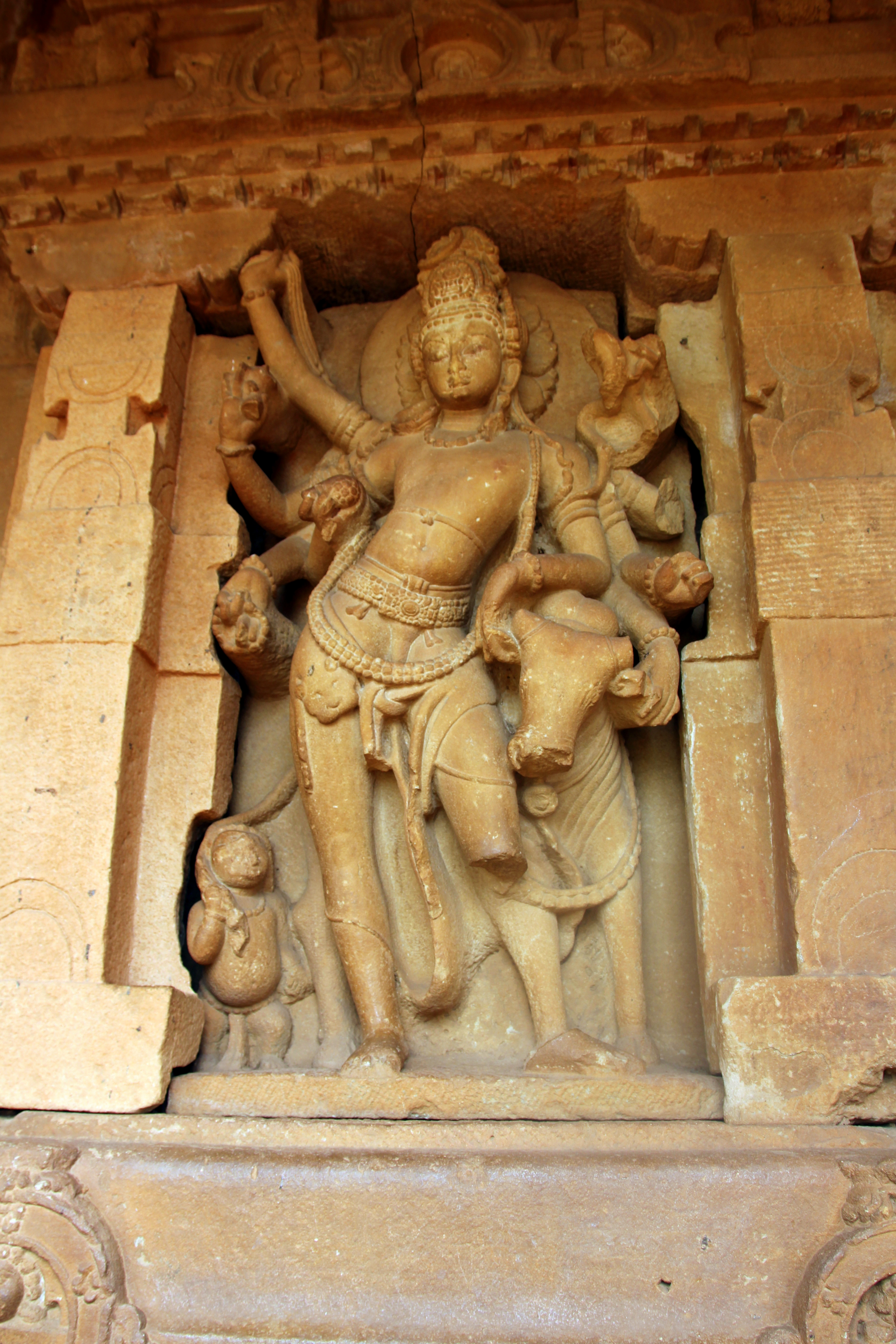
Shiva with Nandi

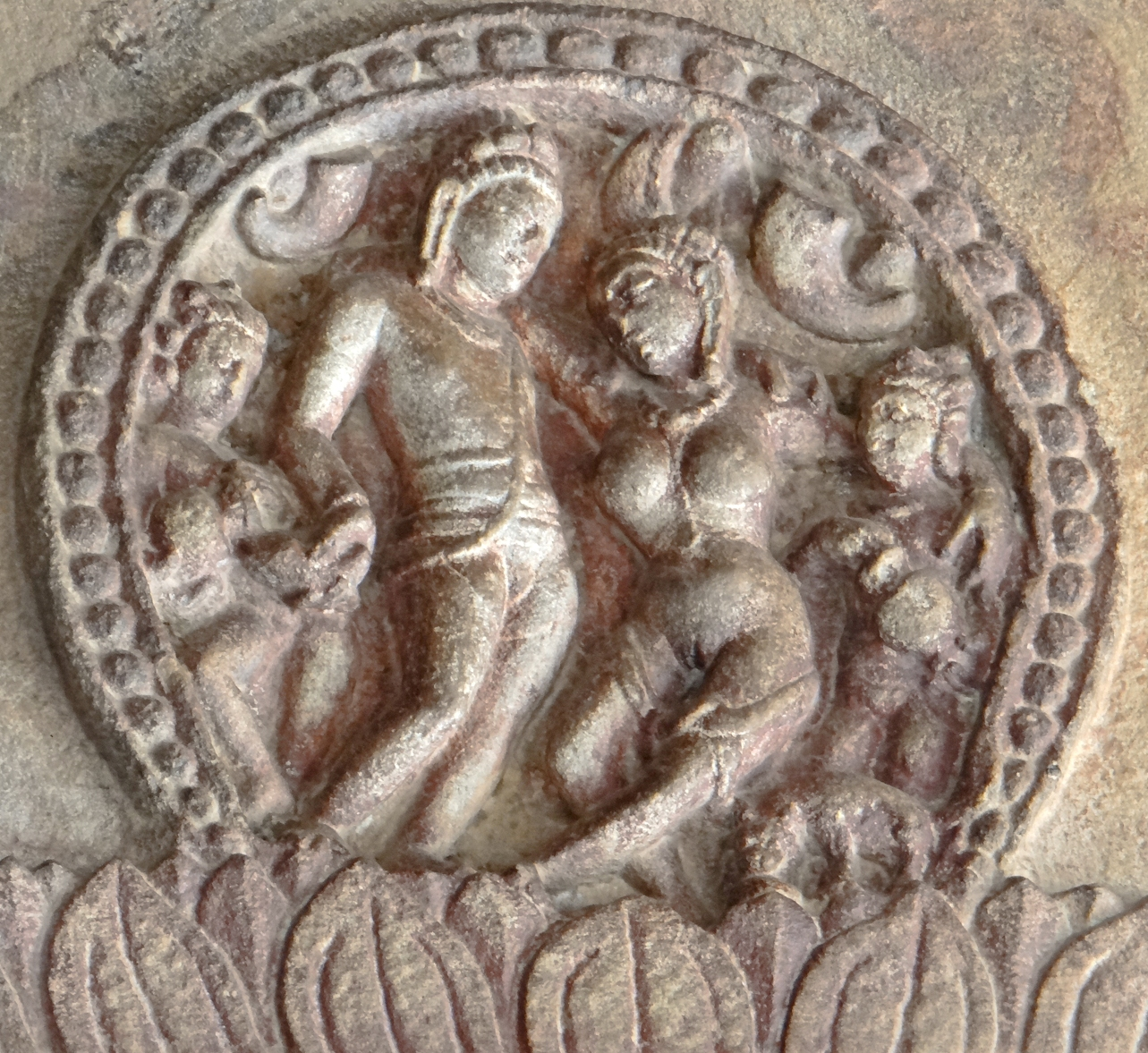
Porch roundel with lovers. Mithuns
