= Aihole =

Historic site in Karnataka, India

Group of monuments at Aihole
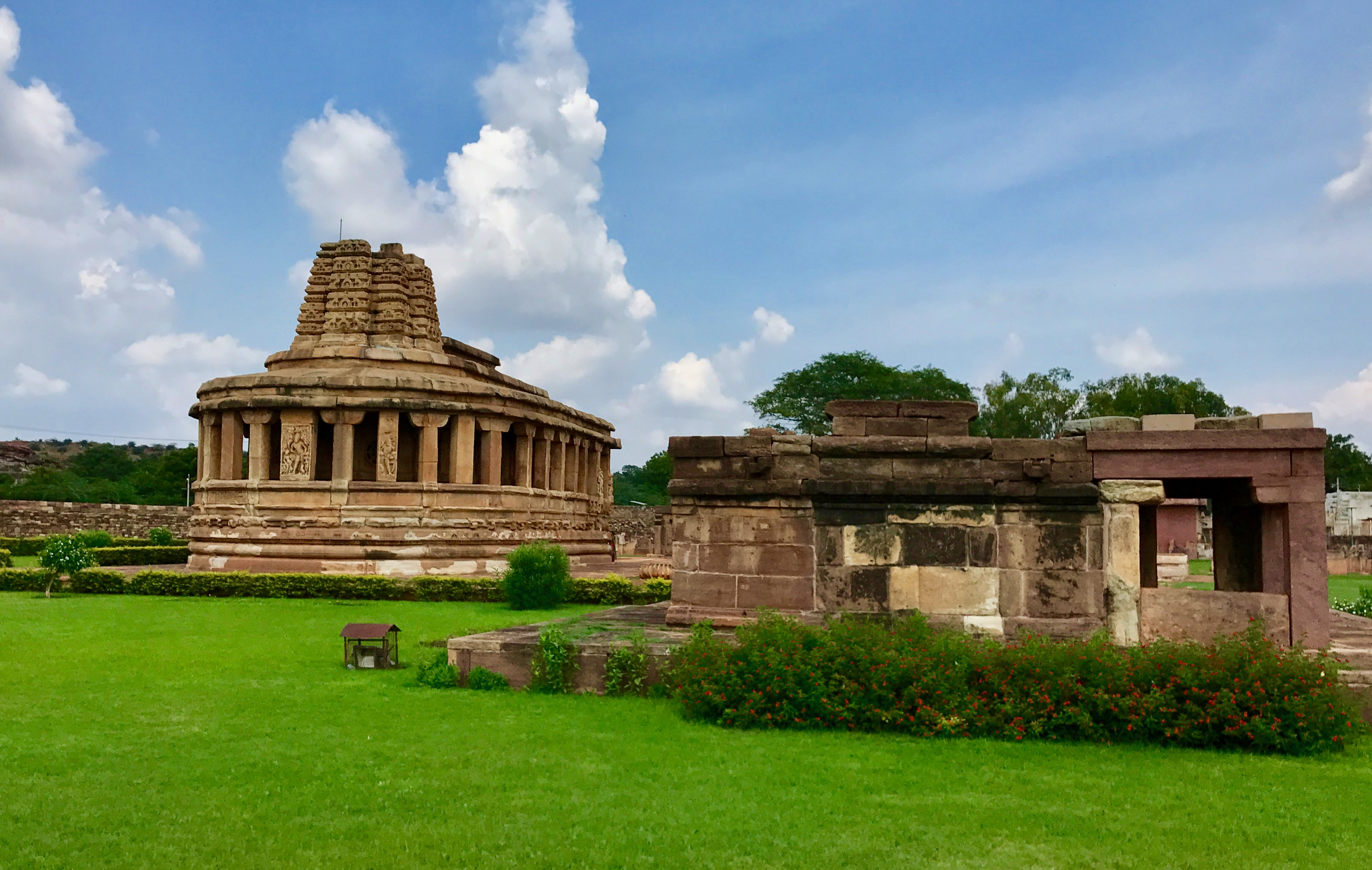
- Durga temple cluster at Aihole

- Location of Aihole Aihole (Karnataka)
- 16°1′08″N 75°52′55″E
- Location: Bagalkot, Karnataka, India
- Nearest city: Hunagunda

History
- Built: 4th–12th century CE

Site notes
- Elevation: 810 m (2,657 ft)
- Area: 5 square kilometres (1.9 sq mi)
- Architectural styles: Hindu, Jain, Buddhist temples and monasteries
- Governing body: Gram panchayati Archaeological Survey of India

Aihole (ಐಹೊಳೆ), also referred to as Aivalli, Ahivolal or Aryapura, is a historic site of ancient and medieval-era Buddhist, Hindu and Jain monuments in Karnataka, India that dates from the sixth century through the twelfth century CE. Most of the surviving monuments at the site date from the 7th to 10th centuries. Located around an eponymous small village surrounded by farmlands and sandstone hills, Aihole is a major archaeological site, featuring over 120 stone and cave temples spread along the Malaprabha river valley, in Bagalakote district.

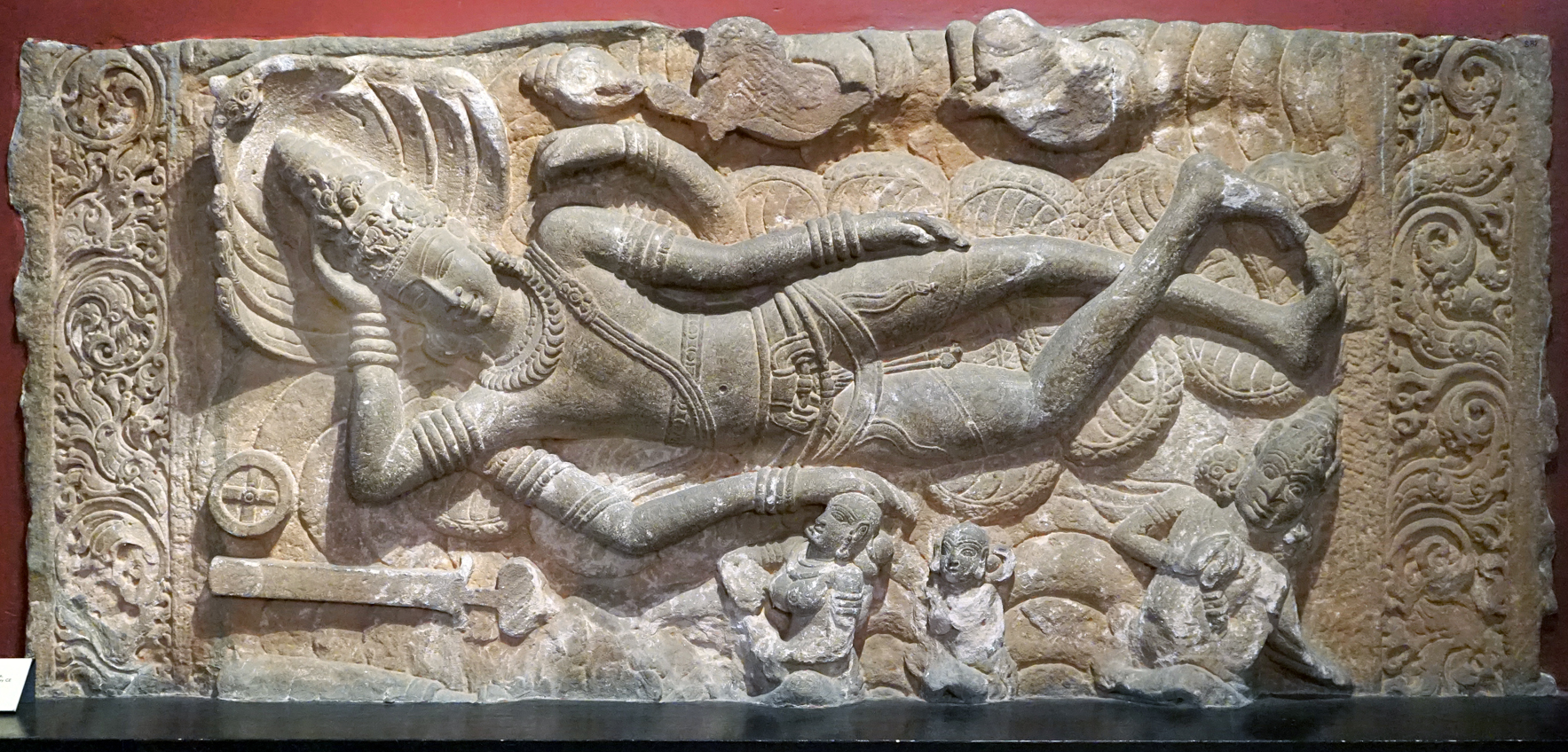
Relief of sleeping Vishnu, now in Mumbai

Aihole is 35 kilometres (22 mi) from Badami and about 9.7 kilometres (6.0 mi) from Pattadakal, both of which are major centres of historically important Chalukya monuments. Aihole, along with nearby Badami (Vatapi), emerged by the 6th century as the cradle of experimentation with temple architecture, stone artwork, and construction techniques. This resulted in 16 types of free-standing temples and 4 types of rock-cut shrines. The experimentation in architecture and arts that began in Aihole yielded the group of monuments at Pattadakal, a UNESCO World Heritage Site.

Over 100 Aihole temples are Hindu, a few are Jain and one is Buddhist. These were built and coexisted in close proximity. The site covers about 5 square kilometres (1.9 sq mi). The Hindu temples are dedicated to Shiva, Vishnu, Durga, Surya and other Hindu deities. The Jain Basadi temples are dedicated to Mahavira, Parshvanatha, Neminatha and other Jain Tirthankaras. The Buddhist monument is a temple and small monastery. Both Hindu and Jain monuments include monasteries, as well as social utilities such as stepwell and water tanks with artistic carvings near major temples.

== Location ==
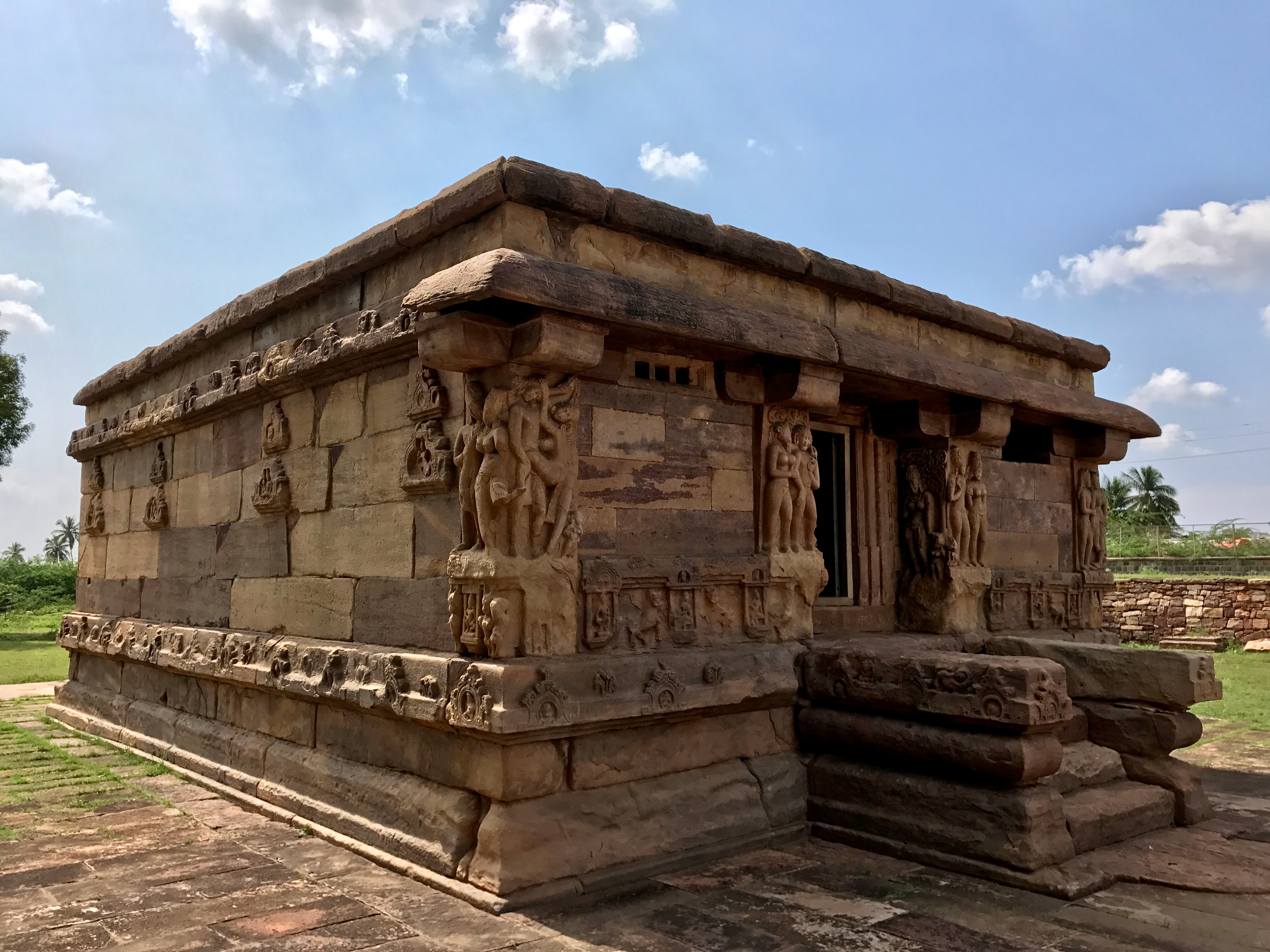
7th - 8th century Huchappaya matha temple

The Aihole monuments are located in the Indian state of Karnataka, about 190 kilometres (118 mi) southeast of Belgaum and 290 kilometres (180 mi) northeast of Goa. The monuments are about 14 miles (23 km) from Badami and about 6 miles (9.7 km) from Pattadakal, set amidst rural villages, farms, sandstone hills, and the Malprabha river valley. The Aihole site preserves over 120 Hindu, Jain, and Buddhist monuments from the 4th to 12th centuries CE. The region is also a site for prehistoric dolmens and cave paintings.

Aihole has no nearby airport, and is about 4 hours drive from Sambra Belgaum Airport (IATA Code: IXG), with daily flights to Mumbai, Bangalore and Chennai. Badami is the closest town connected by railway and highway network to major cities of Karnataka and Goa. It is a protected monument under the laws of the Indian government, and managed by the Archaeological Survey of India (ASI).

== History ==
Aihole is referred to as Ayyavole and Aryapura in its inscriptions and Hindu texts from 4th to 12th century CE, as Aivalli and Ahivolal in colonial British era archaeological reports.

A rock shaped like an axe on the Malaprabha river bank north of the village is associated with the legend of Parashurama, the sixth Vishnu avatar, who is said to have washed his axe here after killing abusive Kshatriyas who were exploiting their military powers, giving the land its red colour. A 19th-century local tradition believed that rock footprints in the river were those of Parashurama. A place near the Meguti hillocks show evidence of human settlement in the pre-historic period. Aihole has historical significance and has been called a cradle of Hindu rock architecture.

The documented history of Aihole is traceable to the rise of the Early Chalukya dynasty in 6th century. It became, along with nearby Pattadakal and Badami, a major cultural centre and religious site for innovations in architecture and experimentation of ideas. The Chalukyas sponsored artisans and built many temples in this region between the 6th and 8th centuries. Evidence of wooden and brick temples dating to 4th-century have been unearthed. Aihole started the experimentations with other materials such as stone around the 5th century when the Indian subcontinent saw a period of political and cultural stability under the Gupta Empire rulers. Badami refined it in 6th and 7th centuries. The experimentations culminated in Pattadakal in the 7th and 8th centuries becoming a cradle of fusion of ideas from South India and North India.

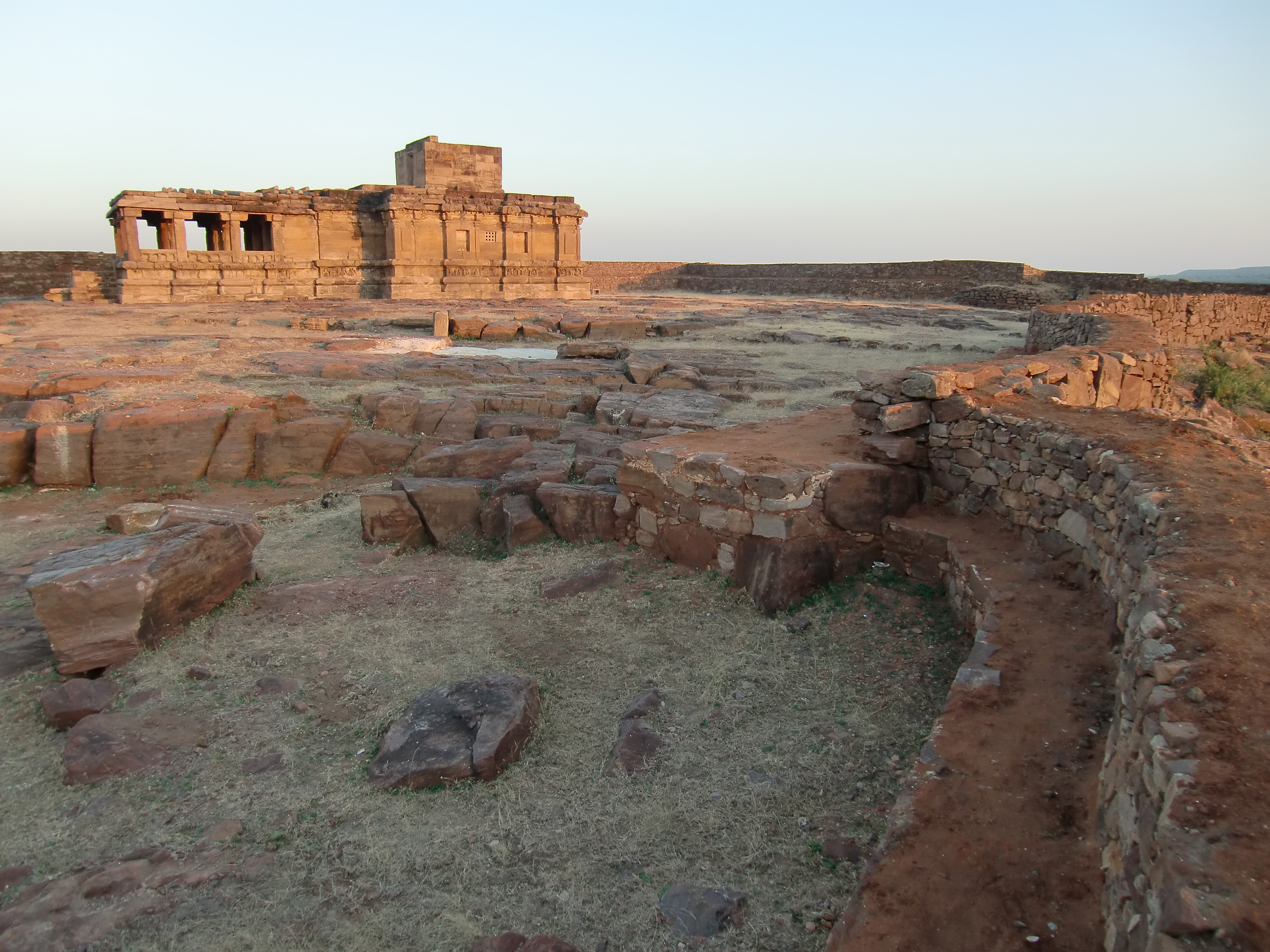
The Aihole fort rubble walls on Meguti hill enclosing the Jain temple, which is dated to 634.

After the Chalukyas, the region became a part of the Rashtrakuta kingdom who ruled in the 9th and 10th century from the capital of Manyakheta. In the 11th and 12th century, the Late Chalukyas (Western Chalukya Empire, Chalukyas of Kalyani) ruled over this region. Even though the area was not the capital or in immediate vicinity from 9th to 12th centuries, new temples and monasteries of Hinduism, Jainism and Buddhism continued to be built in the region based on inscriptional, textual and stylistic evidence. This likely happened, states Michell, because the region was prosperous with a substantial population and surplus wealth.

Aihole was fortified by Late Chalukya kings in the 11th and 12th centuries, in an approximate circle. This indicates the strategic and cultural importance of Aihole to the kings whose capital was far away. Aihole served as a hub of Hindu temple arts in this period with guild of artisans and merchants called the Ayyavole 500, celebrated for their talent and accomplishments in the historical texts of the Deccan region and South India.

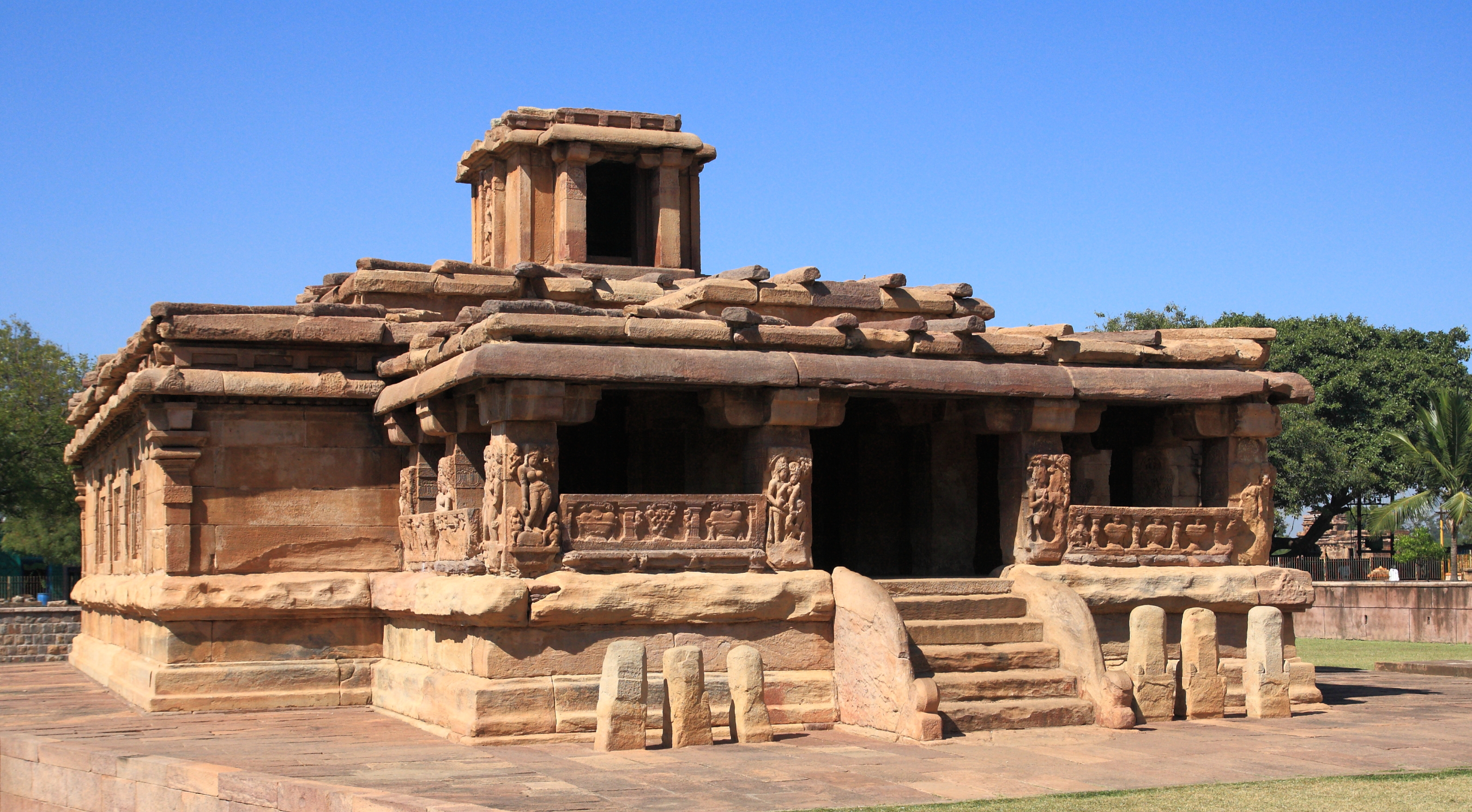
An 8th-century Shiva temple was renamed Lad Khan Temple after a Muslim commander of Bijapur Sultanate who briefly lived here.

In the 13th century and thereafter, the Malprabha valley along with much of Deccan became a target of raids and plunder by the Delhi Sultanate armies devastating the region. From the ruins emerged the Vijayanagara Empire which built forts and protected the monuments, as evidenced by inscriptions in the fort at Badami. However, the region witnessed a series of wars between Vijayanagara Hindu kings and Bahmani Muslim sultans. After the defeat of the Vijayanagara Empire on 23 January 1565 at Talikota, Aihole became a part of the Adil Shahi rule from Bijapur, with some of the Muslim commanders using the temples as residence and their compounds as garrison for storing weapons and supplies. A Hindu temple dedicated to Shiva came to be called Lad Khan temple, named after the Muslim commander who used it as his operational hub, and a name that has been used ever since. In late 17th-century, the Mughal Empire under Aurangzeb gained control of the region from Adil Shahis, after which Maratha Empire gained control of the region. It again changed hands with Haider Ali and Tipu Sultan conquering it in late 18th century, followed by the British that defeated Tipu Sultan and annexed the region.

The monuments at Aihole-Badami-Pattadakal show the existence and a history of interaction between the early northern style and early southern style of Hindu arts. According to T. Richard Blurton, the history of temple arts in north India is unclear as the region was repeatedly sacked by invaders from Central Asia, particularly the Muslim incursion into the subcontinent from 11th-century onwards, and "warfare has greatly reduced the quantity of surviving examples". The monuments in this region are amongst the earliest surviving evidence of these early religious arts and ideas.

=== Archaeological site ===
Aihole became a significant archaeological site and attracted scholarly attention after the British India officials identified and published their observations. The colonial era scholars hypothesized that the Apsidal shape Durga temple in Aihole may reflect the adoption by Hindus and Jains of the Buddhist Chaitya hall design and the influence of early Buddhist arts. They also identified historically significant 7th-century inscriptions.

For much of the 20th-century, Aihole remained a neglected site. Until the 1990s, the site consisted of houses and sheds built up to and in some cases extending into the historical monuments. The walls of the ancient and medieval temples were shared by some of these homes. Investments in infrastructure, land acquisition and relocation of some residences has allowed limited excavations and created a few dedicated archaeological parks including one for the much-studied Durga temple at Aihole. Excavated ancient and medieval era artifacts and broken temple pieces, including a complete life-size nude Lajja Gauri in birthing position and with a lotus head, now resides in an ASI museum next to the Durga temple in Aihole. Many temples and monasteries continue to be set amidst narrow streets and congested settlement.

The Aihole site and artwork are a major source of empirical evidence and comparative studies of Indian religions and art history in the Indian subcontinent. The Aihole's antiquity, along with four other major 5th to 9th century sites – Badami, Pattadakal, Mahakuteshvara and Alampur – is significant to scholarship relating to archaeology and religions. These states George Michell, display a "meeting and fragmentation of different temple styles and the creation of local variants". This fusion and exploration of arts and ideas later became a part of northern and southern Indian architectural repertoires.

== Chronology ==
Aihole monuments preserve evidence of North Indian temple architecture styles that are missing elsewhere. The Gaudar Gudi (Note: Gudi means "shrine" in Kannada, and regionally used to connote a Hindu temple.) temple mimics a wooden temple design with stone, with no superstructure but a flat temple raised on a plinth with stairs, square sanctum, a circumambulatory path and southern style columned hall with northern style shrine niches. The roof mimics sloping wooden version and has log-like stone strips. The Chikki temple is another such example, that innovates by adding stone screens for light inside the temple. The stone temples are dated to the first quarter of the 5th-century, suggesting the prior temples to centuries before.

Aihole was a meeting place of styles but one of several around the 6th century CE, that were on "their way to development elsewhere". They became preserved in Aihole probably because building and cultural activity stopped there around the 12th century. Though excavations have yielded evidence that scholars disagree in dating, states Harle, it is probable that the earliest surviving temples in Aihole are from the 6th century and later.

Gary Tartakov links the temples at Aihole to 2nd century CE style and arts found in the Ajanta Caves, adding that while the Ajanta and Aihole monuments share some organizational features, there are distinct differences that suggest a "leap in time" and parallel developments in cave-based Ajanta and Aihole stone temple designs.

According to Christopher Tadgell, the Aihole apsidal temples were influenced by the Buddhist chaitya-griha, but not directly. The immediate precedent for these is found in the mid-5th-century Hindu temple at Chikka Mahakuta, another place where artists and architects explored temple construction ideas.

== Hindu monuments ==
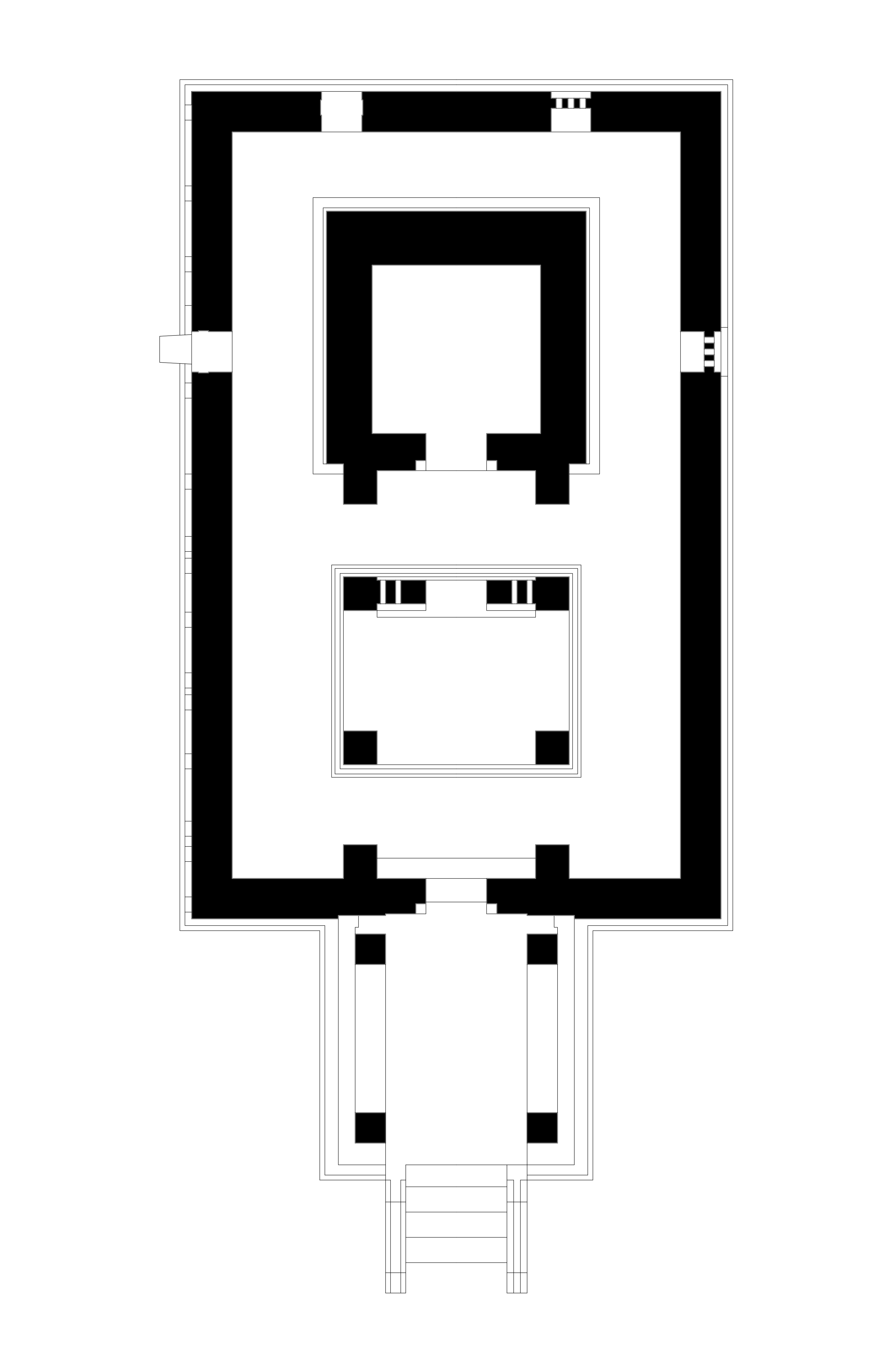
The floor plan of Huchimalligudi temple, Aihole.

Aihole was an early medieval era meeting place and a cradle for experimentation of Hindu arts, particularly temple architecture. The regional artisans and architects of Aihole region created prototypes of 16 types of free-standing temples and 4 types of rock-cut shrines to express in stone the theology of Hinduism. Though there is a sprinkling of Jaina monuments in Aihole, the temples and relief artworks are predominantly Hindu.

The Aihole temples experimented with two layouts: sandhara (with circumambulatory path) and nirandhara (without circumambulatory path). In terms of towers above the sanctum, they explored several superstructures: shikhara (tapering superstructure of discrete squares), mundamala (temple without superstructure, literally, garland with shaved head), rekhaprasada (smooth curvilinear superstructure also based on squares prevalent in northern and central India), Dravidian vimana (pyramidal style of southern India) and Kadamba-Chalukya Shikhara (a fusion style). The layout typically followed squares and rectangles (fused squares), but the Aihole artists also tried out prototypes of an apsidal layout (like a Buddhist or Church hall). In addition, they experimented with layout of mantapa within the shrines, the pillars, different types of windows to let light in, reliefs and statues, artwork on mouldings and pillars, bracket designs, ceiling, structure interlocking principles and styles of friezes. In some temples they added subsidiary shrines such as Nandi-mantapa, a prakara (wall) and styles of pratoli (gateway).

=== Durga temple complex ===
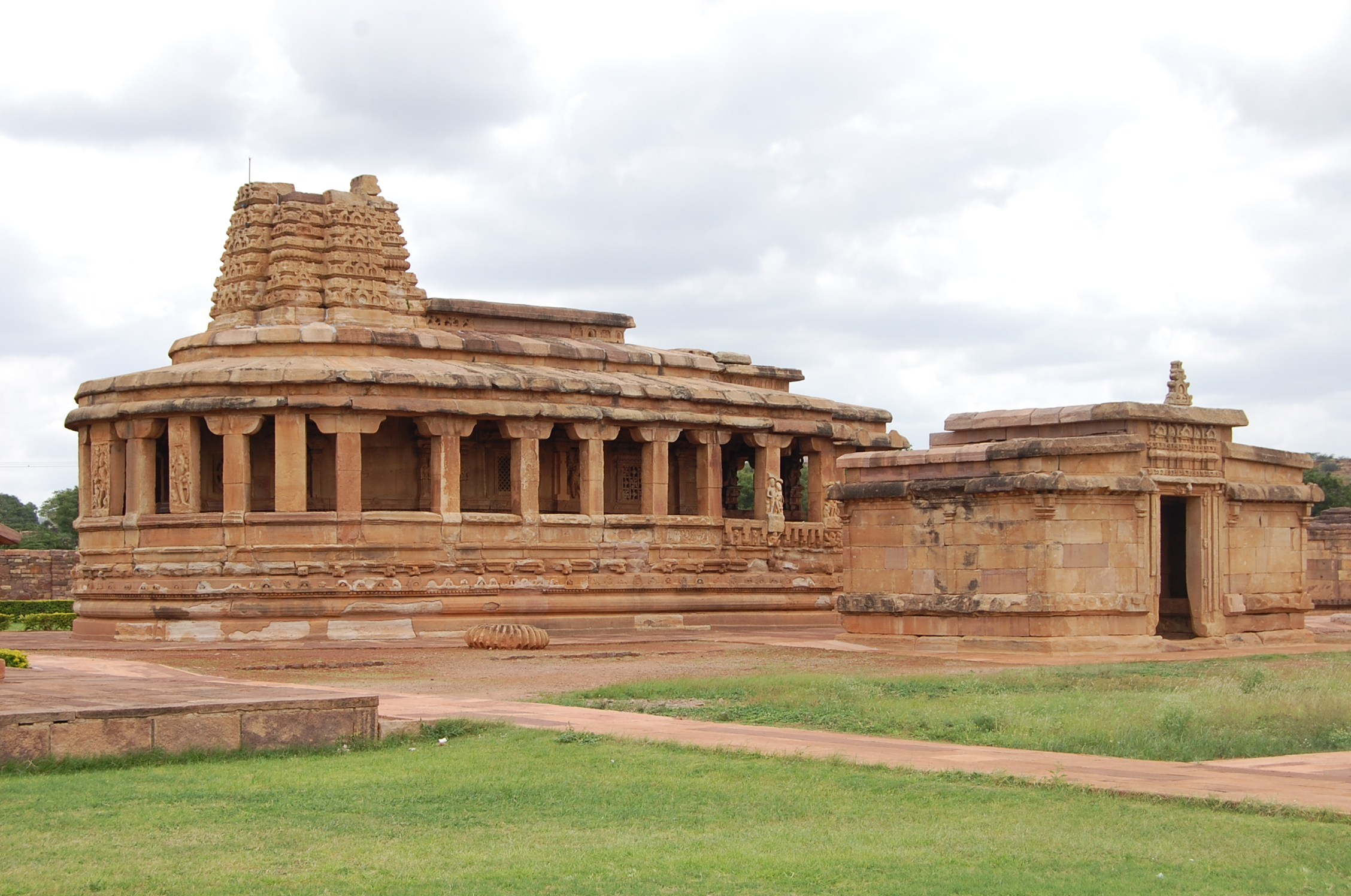
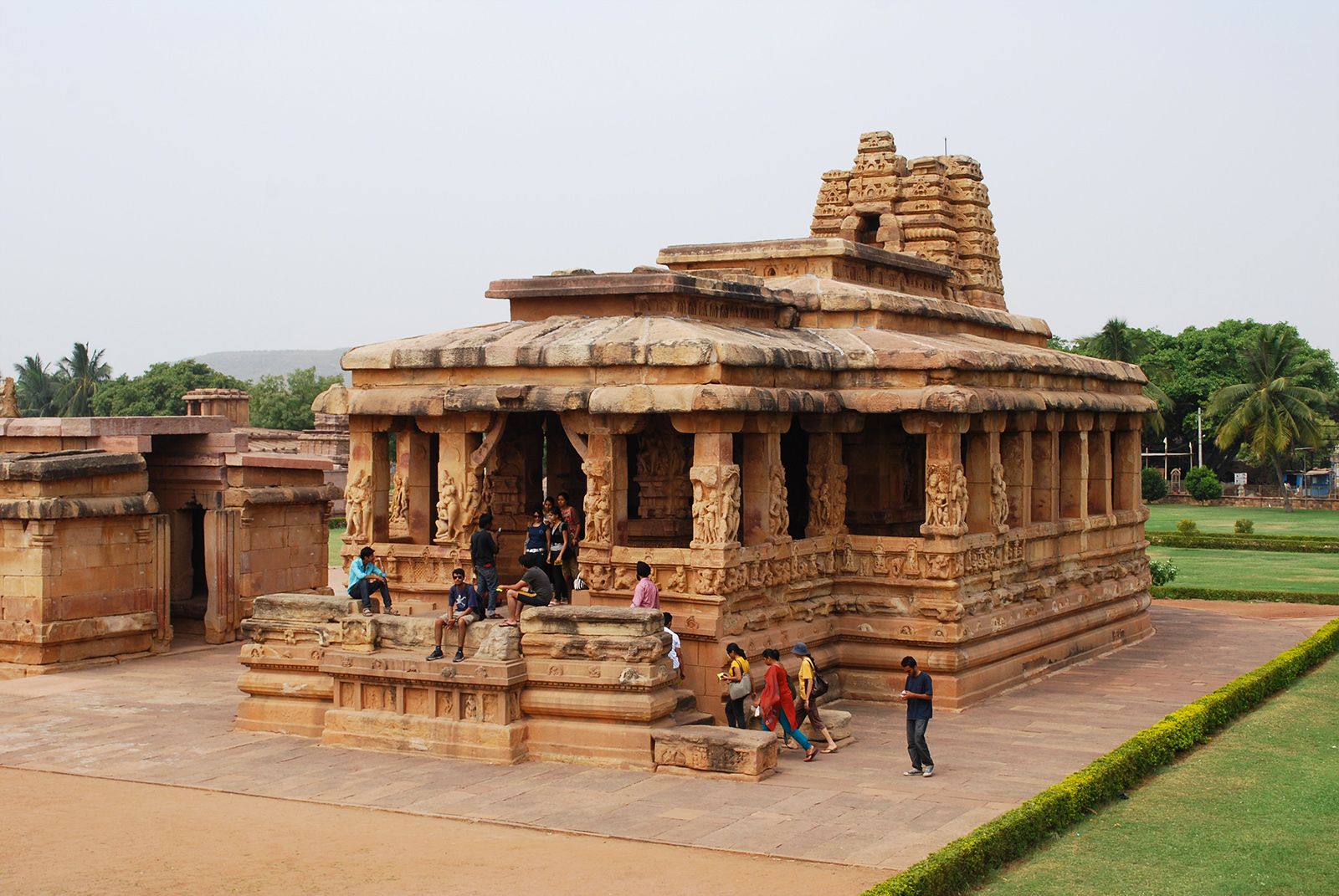
Two views of the Durga temple at Aihole.

The Durga temple is the best known and studied of the Aihole temples. It has a misleading name, because the temple is not named after goddess Durga. According to one theory, it stands near the ruins of a fort-like enclosure or durg during a time of late medieval era Hindu Muslim conflict in the region. According to another local tradition, a stone rubble durg and lookout was assembled on its flat roof and locals therefore began calling it the Durga temple. The temple was originally dedicated to Hindu gods Surya and Vishnu. The temple was dated by early scholars to the 5th century CE, but variously revised to be from between the late 6th and early 8th century.

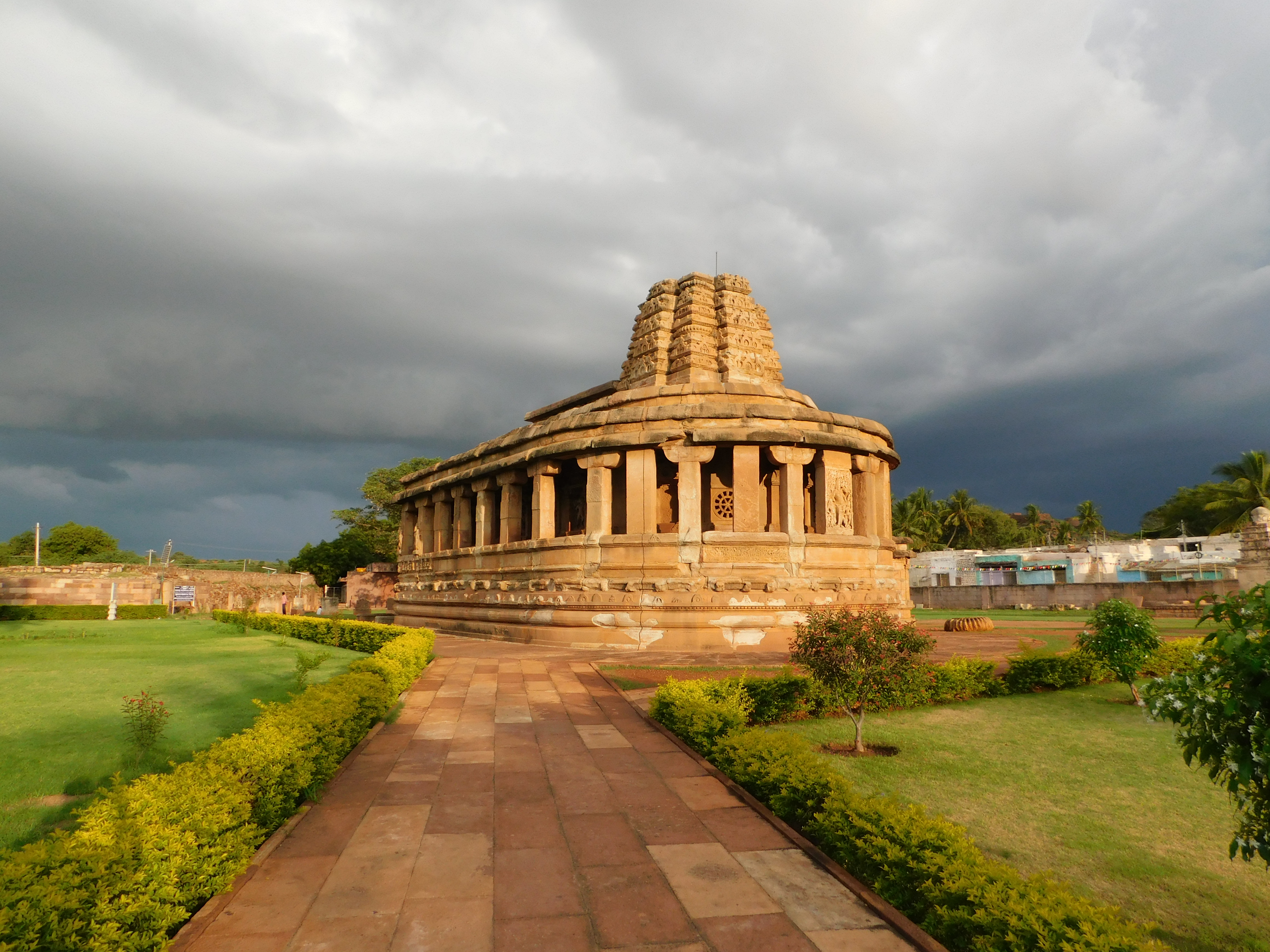
Durga temple Aihole - Another view

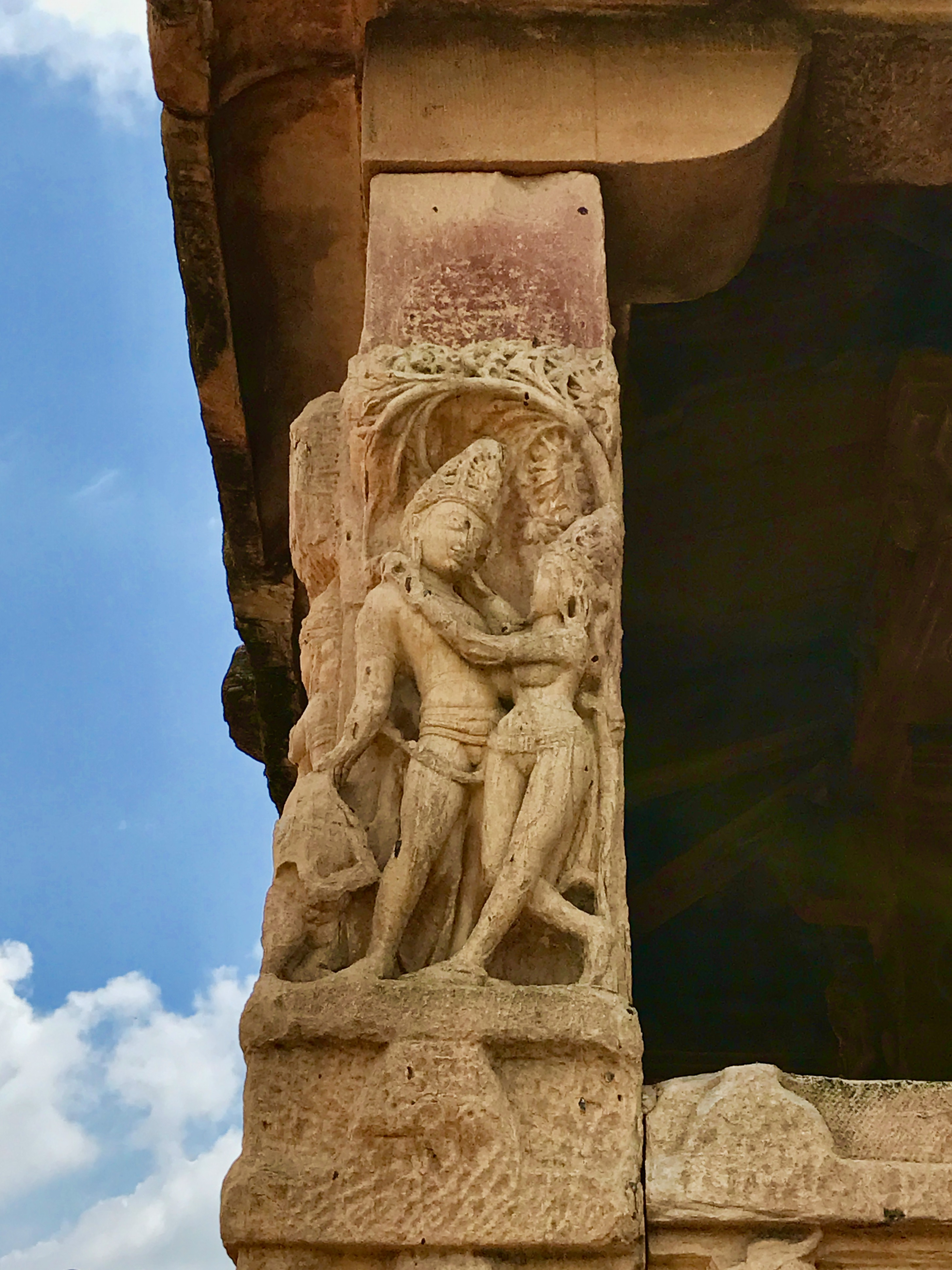
An amorous couple at the Durga temple.

The Durga temple is the principal attraction for Aihole visitors and iconic in its apsidal layout. (Note: For the temple's detailed schematic plan, see Vinayak Bharne and Krupali Krusche's Rediscovering the Hindu Temple, and Christopher Tadgell's The East.) This shape is similar to 2nd or 1st century BCE Buddhist chaitya halls found in Ajanta Caves. The Durga temple stands on a high moulded adhisthana and a damaged tower that had a curvilinear shikhara. The damaged tower's amalaka crown lies on the ground. A colonnaded and covered ambulatory passage with major carvings runs around the sanctum. The mukha mantapa (main hall) and the sabha mantapa (community hall for functions) show intricate carvings.

The Durga temple reverentially displays gods and goddesses from Shaivism, Vaishnavism and Shaktism traditions of Hinduism. The included near life-size statues include Shiva, Vishnu, Harihara (half Shiva, half Vishnu), Durga in her Mahishasuramardini form killing the buffalo demon, goddesses Ganga and Yamuna, Brahma, Surya, avatars of Vishnu such as Varaha and Narasimha. The temple has friezes to tell the story of the Ramayana and the Mahabharata. Further, the temple has artwork showing scenes of daily life and couples, including several amorous couples in various stages of courtship and mithuna.

The Durga temple complex consists of seven Hindu monuments. Next to the Durga temple is the Suryanarayana temple with a pyramidal shikara on top. It has a Surya statue with each hand holding a lotus flower in its garbha griya (sanctum), in a chariot and seven small horses carved at the bottom. The temple outline is intact, but most of the details are damaged.

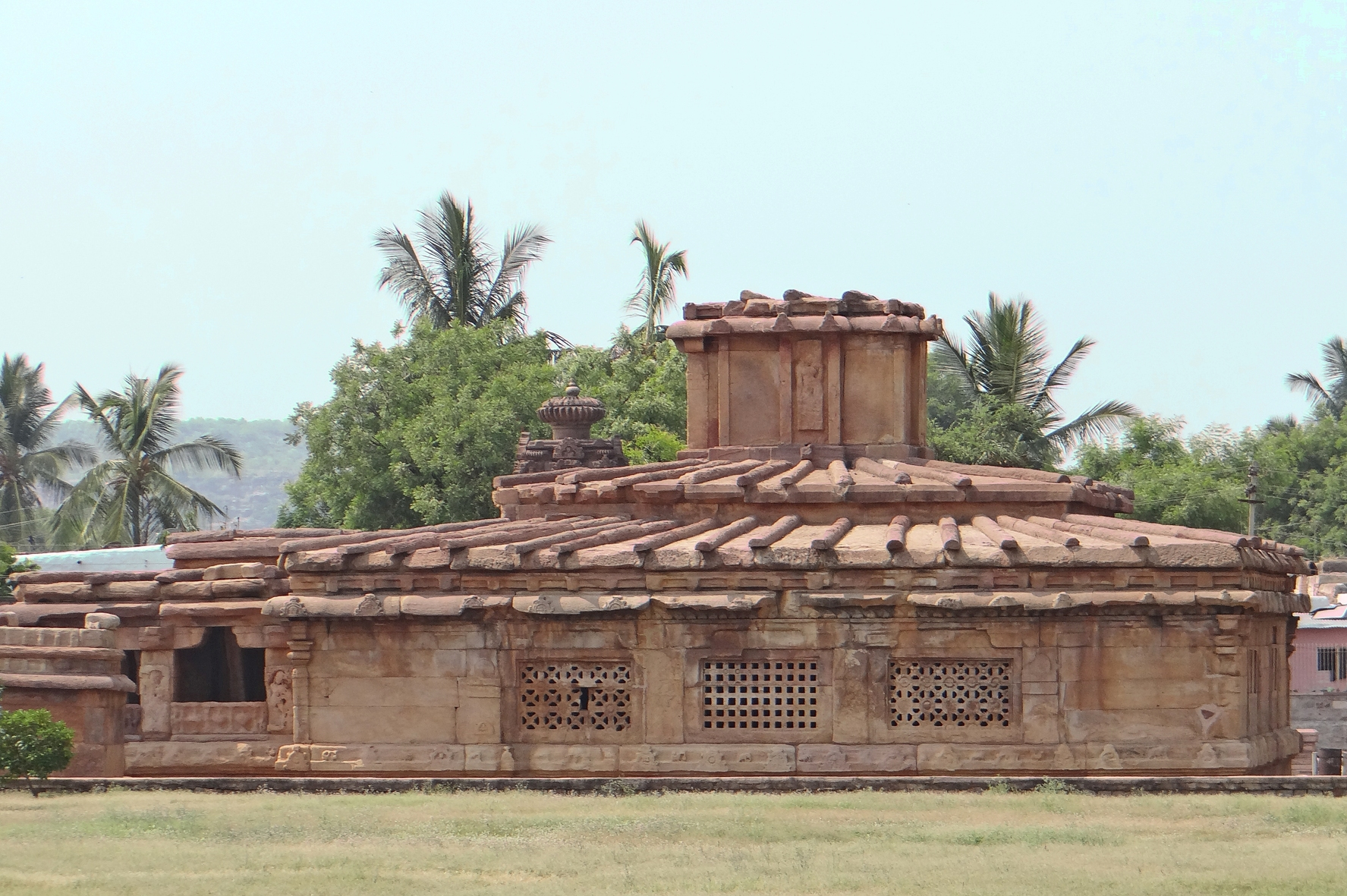
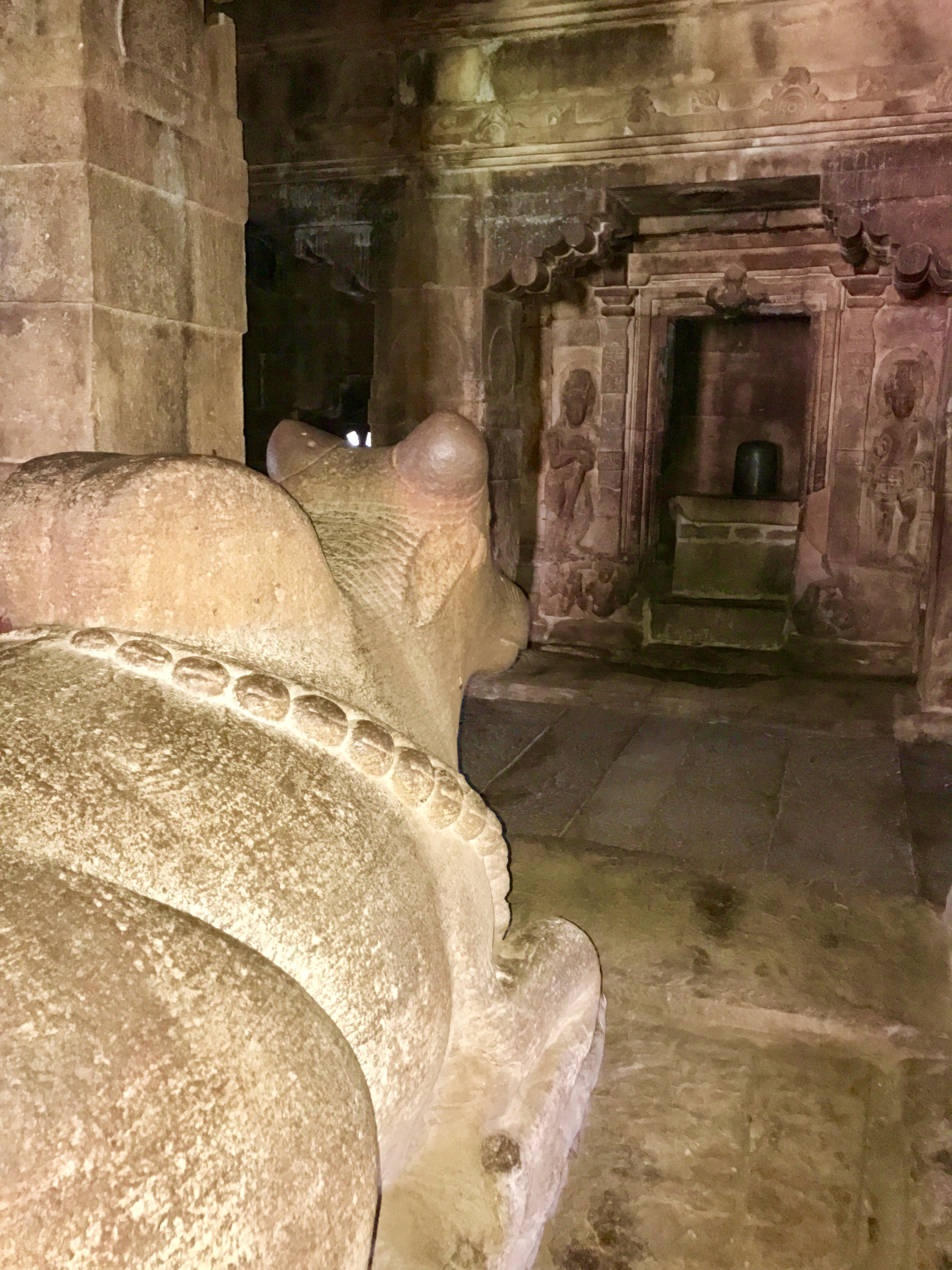
Stone beams mimicking logs on Chalukya Shiva Temple roof (left); Nandi facing the Shiva linga inside.

The Chalukya Shiva Temple Temple is near the Durga temple and has been variously dated to "about 450 CE", or from 6th to 8th centuries. The temple is named after the Muslim commander under Adil Shahi Sultan who briefly stayed here about a thousand years after it was built. He used it to coordinate his military campaign in the region. The temple embeds three concentric squares, facing the sanctum with a Shiva Linga. Inside the inner third square is a seated Nandi. The two square mantapas surrounding it create the sabha mantapa or community hall, providing ample space for devotees and community to gather for functions. The second concentric square is supported by a set of 12 intricately carved pillars. The wall has floral designs. The temple inside is lit with natural sunlight coming in from lattice windows of the north Indian style. The temple roof stones include log-shaped stone strips suggestive of an attempt to mimic more ancient timber temple construction.

The Ladkhan temple includes iconography from the Shaivism, Vaishnavism and Shaktism traditions of Hinduism. On the lintel of the sanctum with Shiva Linga, for example, is a Garuda image who carries Vishnu. The temple has reliefs showing goddesses Ganga and Yamuna, as well as other deities. A set of stone stairs connect the lower level to the second floor whereupon is a damaged square shrine. On three sides of this upper level are Vishnu, Surya and Ardhanareshvara (half Shiva, half Parvati). Like other Aihole Hindu temples, the temple includes scenes from daily life, including amorous couple in courtship and kama scenes.

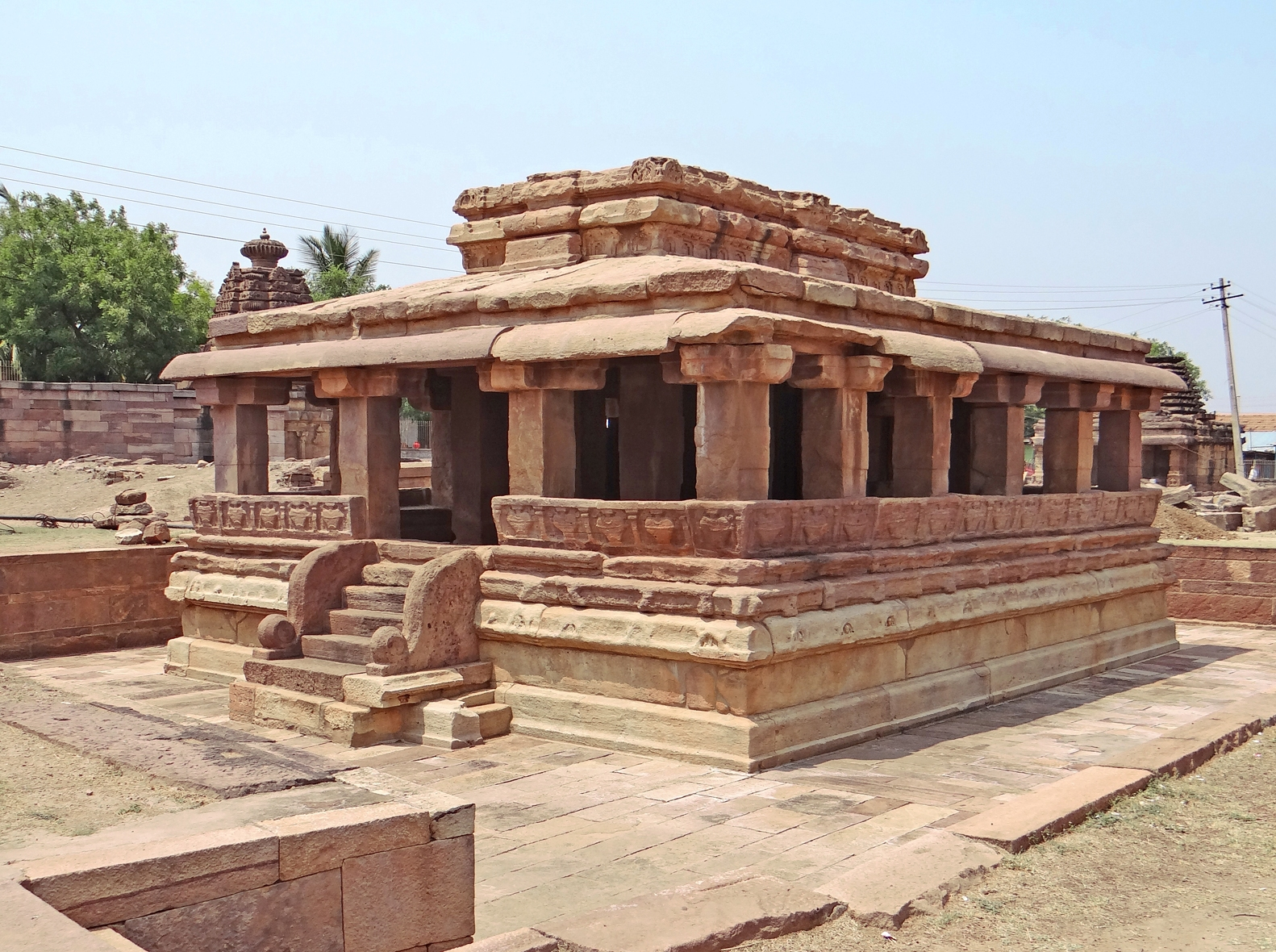
Gaudargudi temple experiments an open structure.

Gaudargudi temple stands next to the Ladkhan temple, built on the lines of Ladkhan temple but more open from all sides. According to George Michell, the temple is older than the Ladkhan temple. It too has log-shaped stones, where its timber like form is integrated to serve its structural function. The sanctum is empty but has a Gajalakshmi on its lintel. An inscription engraved on the lintel states that the temple has been dedicated to goddess Gauri (an aspect of Parvati). There is evidence that the sanctum, the inside mantapa, and niches on outer walls had carved statues, but these are now empty. Gaudargudi was among the earliest temples when architects included pradakshina patha (circumambulatory path) in Hindu temple design.

Next to the Gaudargudi (also spelled Gaudergudi) temple is a large stepwell for utility water storage whose walls have ancient carved sculptures. This stepwell is between the Gaudargudi and Chakragudi temple. According to Himanshu Ray, the stepwell with its Hindu shrine was likely added in the 10th or 11th century. The Chakragudi is notable for its preserved 7th or 8th century Nagara-style tower superstructure. The temple shows signs of later addition of a mantapa, whose style suggests 9th-century Rashtrakuta extension. To the southwest of the Durga temple complex is the Badigargudi (also spelled Badigergudi) temple with pyramidal tower that explores a squat and shrinking discrete squares-topped design with a large cubical sukanasa containing a Surya (Sun god) icon. Much of the Badigargudi relief artwork has been damaged and eroded.

The Durga temple complex houses the Aihole Museum and Art Gallery, managed by the Archeological Survey of India. The museum has outdoor display of excavated statues, artwork, hero stones, and temple parts demolished in past. It also has an indoor collection with best-preserved pieces of statues and temple parts found in the region. The collection includes images of Shiva, Parvati, Vishnu, Lakshmi, Brahma, Saraswati, Durga, Saptamatrika, Surya, Indra, and others. The life-size Lajja Gauri with lotus head, found in Aihole, is a part of the indoor collection.

=== Ravana Phadi cave ===
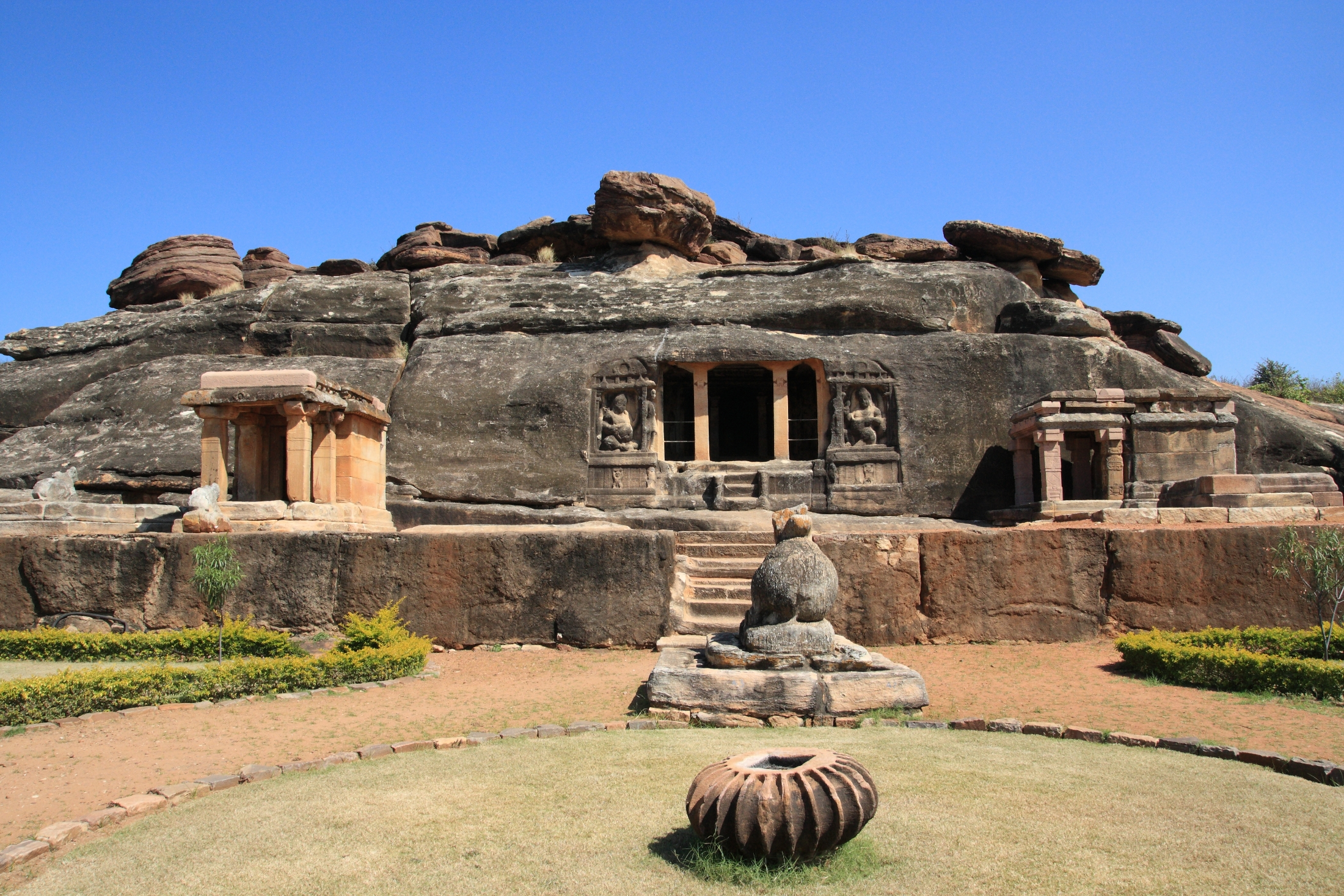
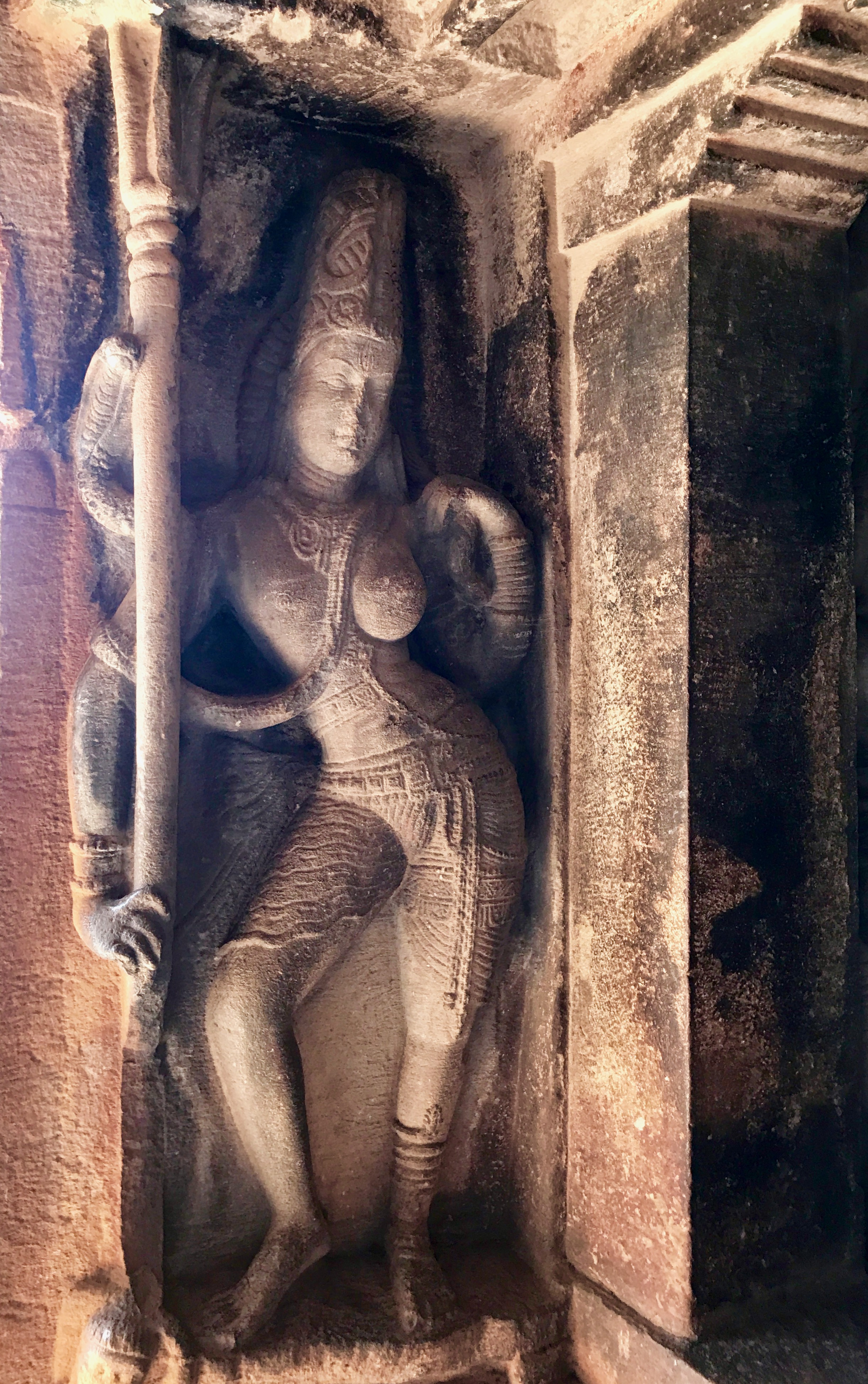
Ravanaphadi cave (left); One of the carvings inside: Ardhanarishvara (half Shiva, half Parvati)

Ravanaphadi is one of the oldest rock-cut cave temples in Aihole, located less than a kilometre uphill, northeast from the Durga temple complex. The temple dates to the 6th century. The entrance has an eroded fluted column and seated Nandi facing the temple sanctum, with several other small monuments. Inside the cave are three near square mandapas, the innermost featuring the Shiva linga and connected to the entrance mandapa by a rectangular space.

The entrance of the Ravanaphadi cave has a Nidhi and seated guardian on each side. Then, on left, is an image of Ardhanarishvara portraying the equivalence and essential interdependence of the masculine left Shiva and feminine right Parvati. Past this fused image, is the first mandapa to the left of which is a niche carved space. In it is 6th century artwork showing dancing Shiva (Nataraja) with Parvati, Saptamatrikas or seven mothers of Shaktism tradition, Ganesha and Kartikeya. On the right side of the main mandapa is Harihara portraying a fused image of Shaivism and Vaishnavism, with left Shiva and right Vishnu. On the opposite wall of Harihara is Shiva with three primary river goddesses of Hindu theology, and he stands with Parvati and the skeletal ascetic Bhringi.

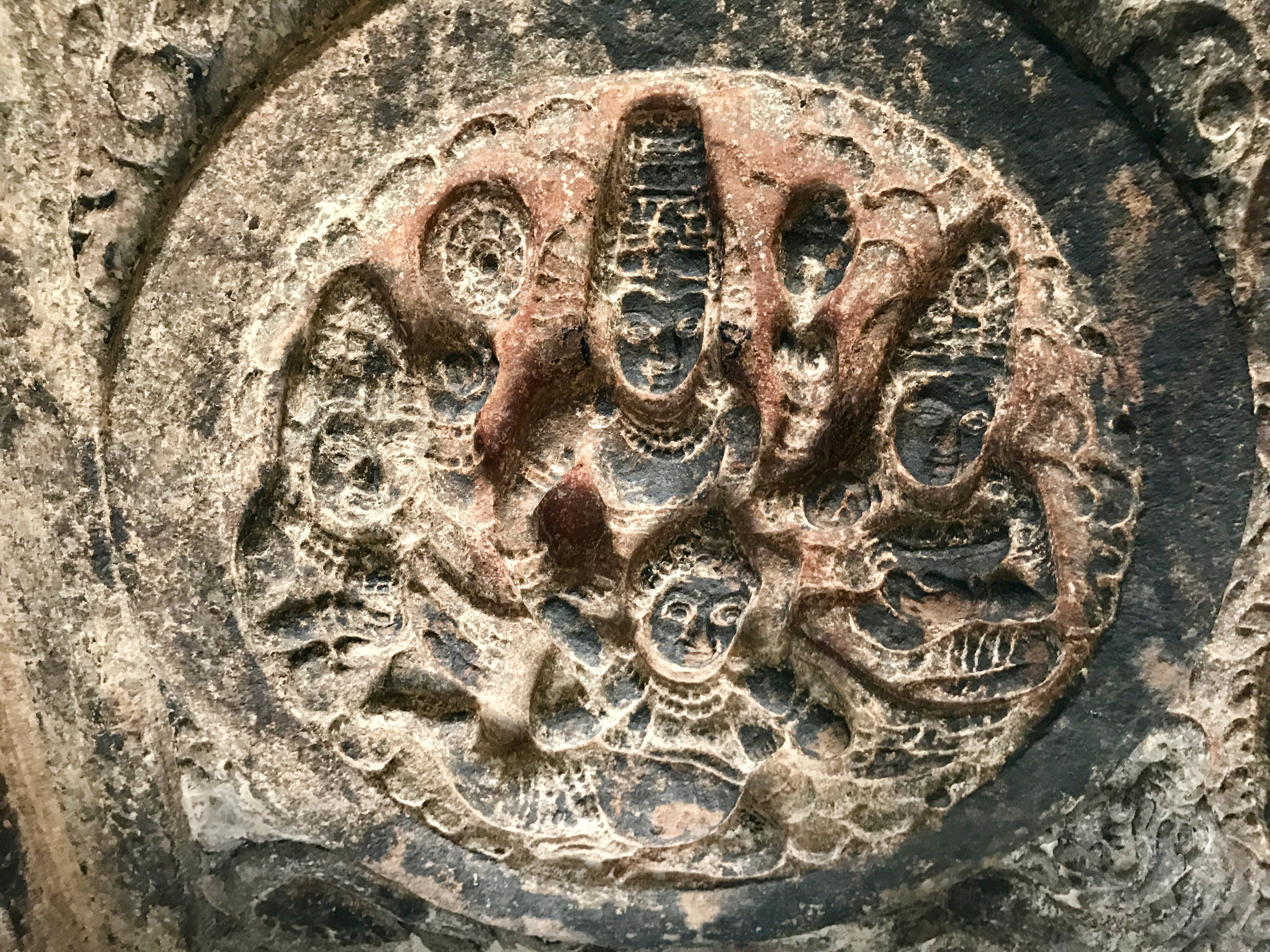
Vishnu and Lakshmi with Garuda on Ravanaphadi ceiling

The main mandapa connects to two other near square mandapas. To its north is the sanctum, flanked by Shaiva guardians at its entrance, then Vaishnava Varaha or Vishnu's boar avatar rescuing goddess earth on its left. To the right is a carved image of Shakti Durga as Mahishasuramardine spearing the buffalo demon. To the east of the main mandapa is an empty monastery like chamber. The ceiling of the cave has reliefs. One, for example, shows Vishnu with Lakshmi flying on winged Garuda, another shows the Vedic god Indra with Indrani on an elephant.

According to James Harle, the Ravanaphadi cave is stylistically unique in the Aihole region, and the closest artwork and style is found in the Rameshwara cave of Ellora in north Maharashtra. According to Pia Brancaccio, the Ravanaphadi cave bridges the style and design of "the rock-cut tradition of the Deccan with that of Tamil Nadu".

=== Hucchappayya matha ===
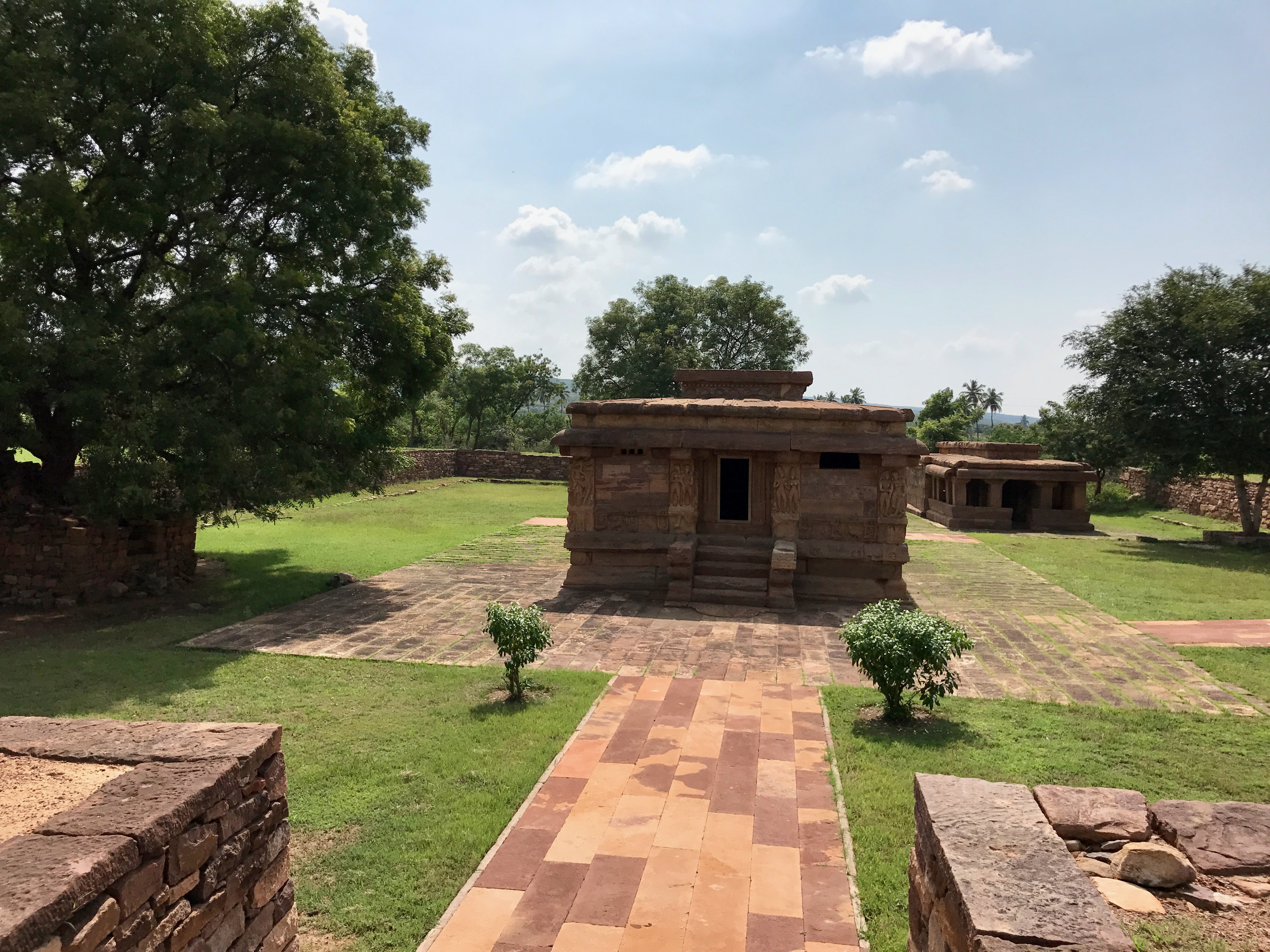
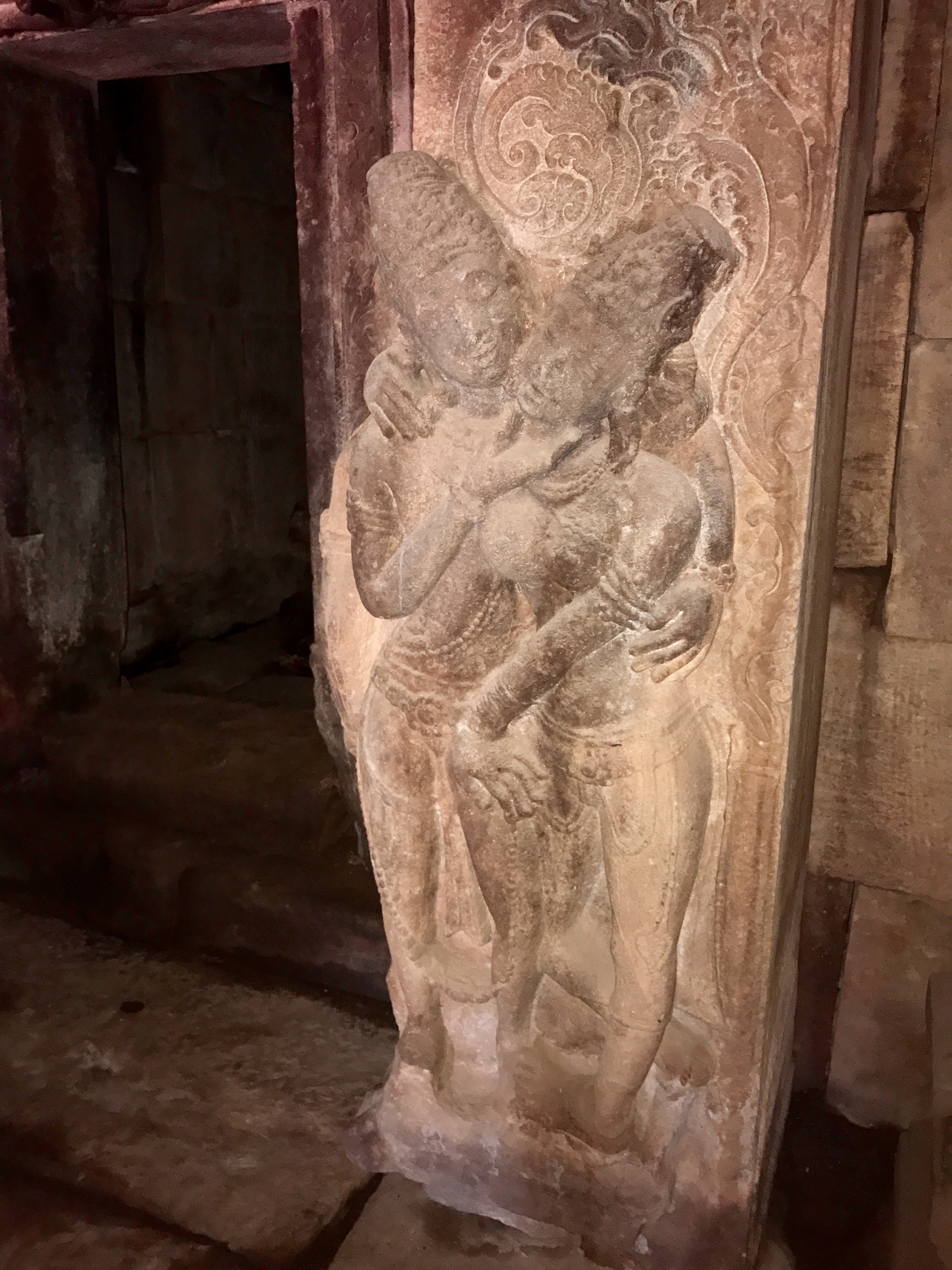
Hucchappayya matha (left); Amorous couple carving inside.

The Huchappayya matha temple is about a kilometre south of the Durga temple complex on the other side of the Aihole village, relatively isolated from other temple clusters. It consists of two Hindu monuments, the front larger one is a Shiva temple and the other a monastery no longer in use. The temple is walled on all sides with stone, has steps leading into a doorway of the mandapa. The temple faces east towards the sunrise, is mostly simple and blank, but has four columns with amorous couples on each. They are in various stages of courtship and mithuna. One of the couple carvings humorously places a horse-headed woman seeking the attention of a man, who carries a shocked expression on his face.

Inside the doorway is the mandapa whose ceiling has three large intricate and circular carvings, one each showing Brahma, Vishnu and Shiva on their respective vahanas. A Nandi sits in the middle of the mandapa floor facing the sanctum wherein is the Shiva Linga. The temple has two inscriptions in old Kannada, as well as a standing Shiva and standing Ganesha. The mandapa walls also show various friezes and reliefs, including more amorous couples. The temple is flat on the top, lacking a superstructure. The temple is likely from the 7th century.

=== Hucchappayya gudi ===
The Huchappayya gudi is a Hindu temple located few hundred meters southwest of the Huchappayya matha, in the farmlands towards the river, away from the village. It is simple east facing 2x2 square temple, with square front portico, a square sabha mandapa (main community ceremony hall, 24' × 24') and an almost-square sanctum. The portico has four pillars, as does the sabha mandapa. The main hall is supported by four pillars placed in a square of the same size as the portico. The temple has North Indian style Rekhanagara tower with rotating squares rising in a curvilinear smooth towards the sky. The tower is damaged, the top amalaka finial and kalasha missing.

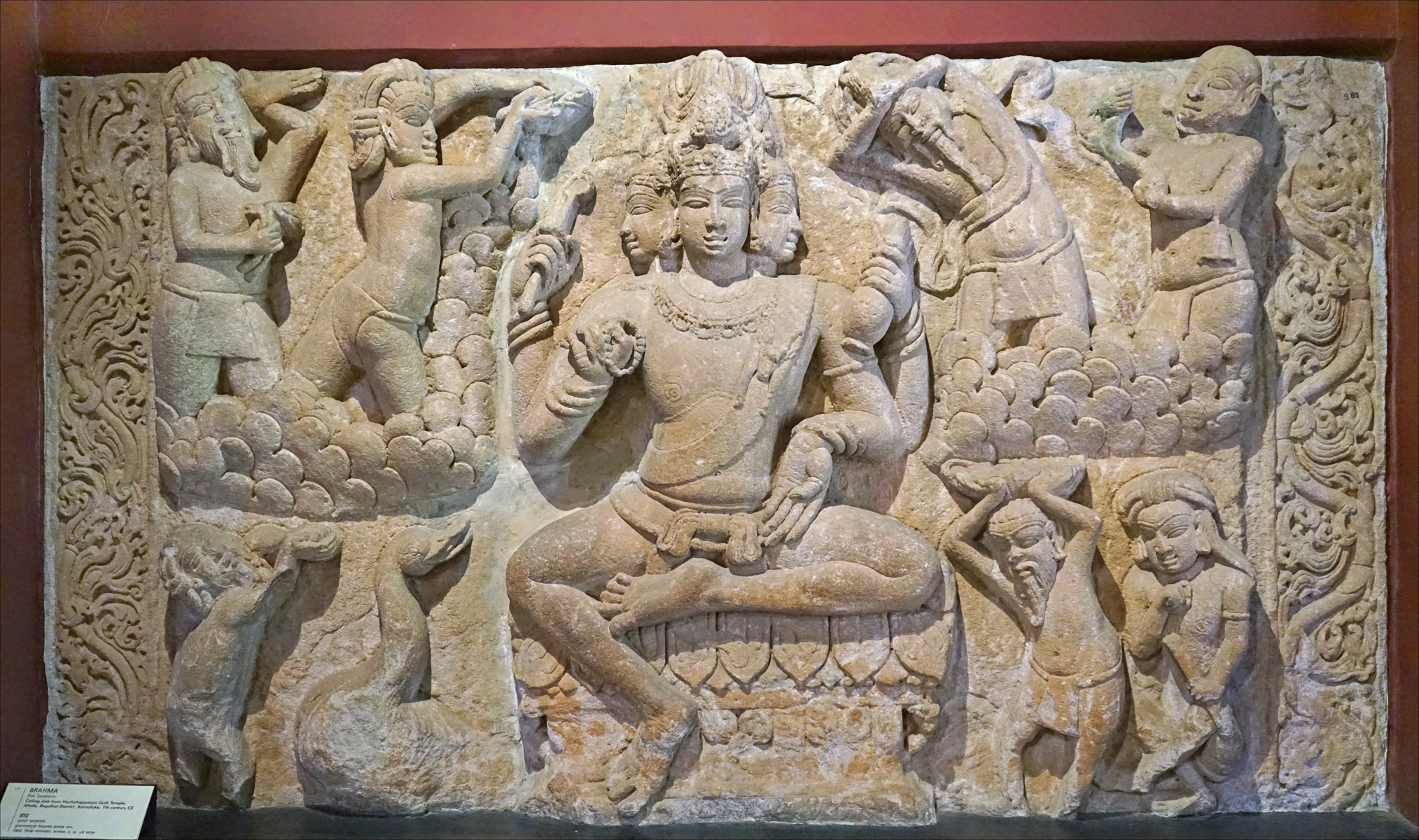
Brahma carving in Hucchappayya gudi, now at a Mumbai Museum.

The temple is notable for its intricate pillar carvings both in the portico and inside, as well as the artwork on its inner walls and ceiling. The carvings show religious themes (Vishnu's avatar Narasimha and Shiva Nataraja on wall, Shaiva dvarapalas, Garuda man-bird clasping two serpents), as well as the daily life of the people (dancers, musicians, individuals in Namaste posture, couple carrying offerings for prayers, flowers and animals). Some panels are humorous such as young women with horse head embracing bearded older men found on the eastern porch column. Outside, there is a slab carved with Saptamatrikas (seven mothers) of the Shaktism Hindu tradition. The temple also has an inscription in old Kannada on one of the pillars inside the main hall.

Hucchappayya gudi is dated to Early Chalukya period (6th–7th century).

=== Ambigergudi temples complex ===
Ambigergudi group is one of the archaeologically significant Aihole complexes situated immediately west of the Durga temple complex, near its entrance ticket office. It consists of three monuments, all aligned to the east–west axis. The easternmost monument is square monument walled on its east, north, and south, and it lacks a tower. It faces the middle monument, which is largest of the three. The middle monument has experimented with an open verandah design concept with sloping slaps for roof cover. The sanctum is inside, and it contains a damaged Surya (Sun god) image whose crown is visible. These eastern two monuments are from 6th to 8th century, the Early Chalukya period.

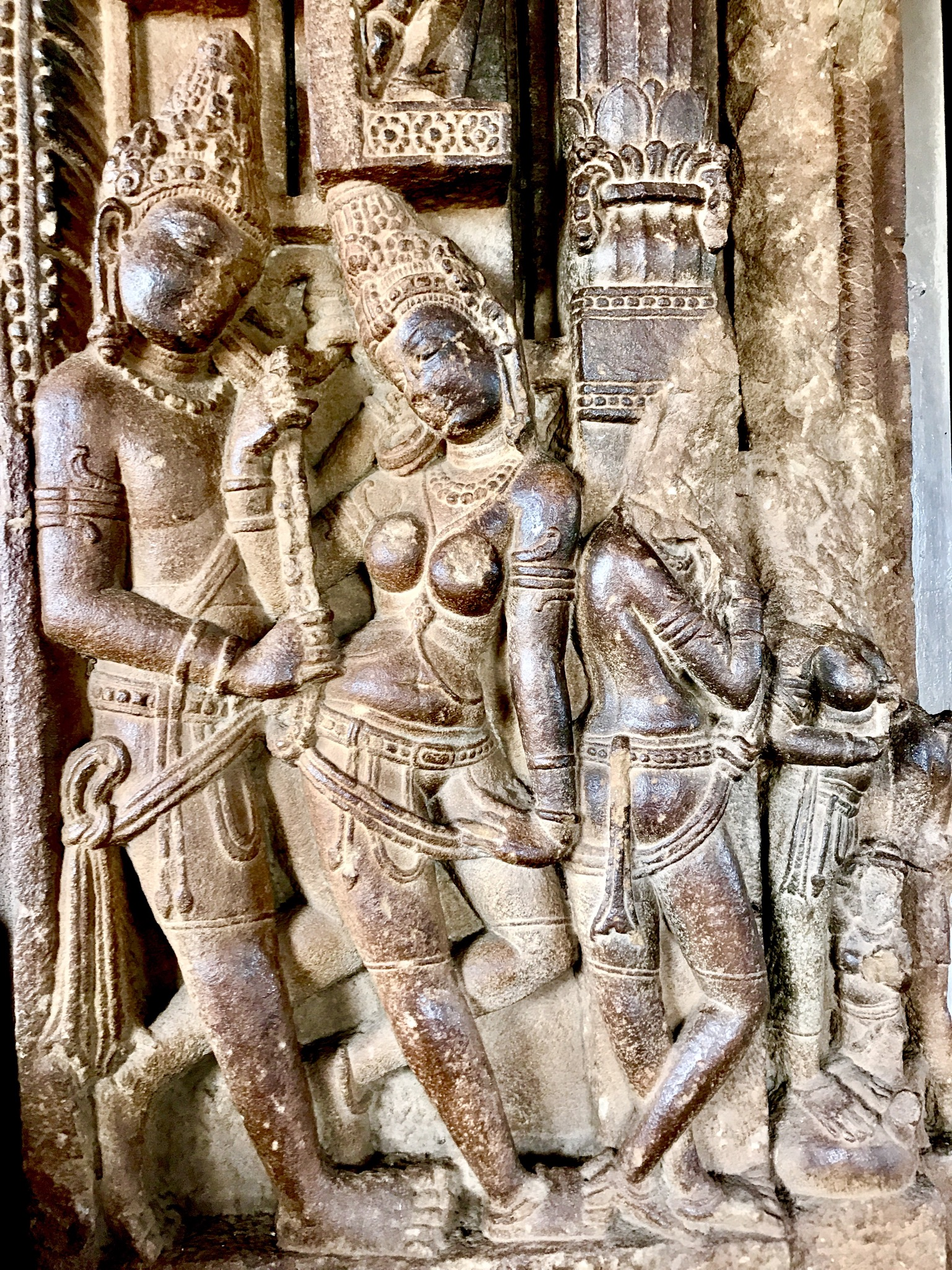
The defaced carvings of Aihole temples.

The third monument in the Ambigergudi complex is a Late Chalukya design from about the 11th century. Its structure and layout feature all elements of the Hindu temple but it is damaged, the image inside the sanctum is missing and the face, nose, and limbs of most of its intricate carvings on the walls are defaced. The structure experiments with square and cubic shaped elements and arrangement of space. The Dravida design stands out above the sanctum walls, with repeated motifs of resonating tower structure as it rises upwards. Like other elements of this temple, the capping roof and finial is missing.

The archaeological significance of the Ambigergudi temple is from the results of limited excavation near the rear wall of the sanctum foundation. (Note: The foundation of the middle of the three monuments shows some remnants of the type of bricks found.) This yielded red-ware bowls dated to the 1st and 3rd century CE, as well as an outline of a single cell more ancient brick temple, which probably the stone temple replaced. According to the hypothesis of Rao, the excavating archaeologist, the 3rd century CE brick temple served as a model and sanctum ground on which a more lasting stone was built. This hypothesis, however, remains tentative as additional evidence to refute or support it has not been found. According to Hemanth Kamdambi, Chalukyan temple inscriptions from the 6th to 8th century are silent about the existence of prior temples.

=== Jyotirlinga temples complex ===
The Jyotirlinga group of monuments contain sixteen Hindu monuments including a large stepwell water utility tank. It is located east of the Durga temple complex compound across the road and to the south of the Ravanaphadi cave. The temples are dedicated to Shiva, with most monuments small to moderate size. The complex is largely in ruins, except for the Nandi mandapas and standing pillars inside the temples some of which show intricately carved but damaged images of Ganesha, Karitikeya, Parvati and Ardhanarishvara (half Shiva, half Parvati). The temples are likely from the Early Chalukya and Rashtrakuta Hindu dynasties.

=== Mallikarjuna temples complex ===
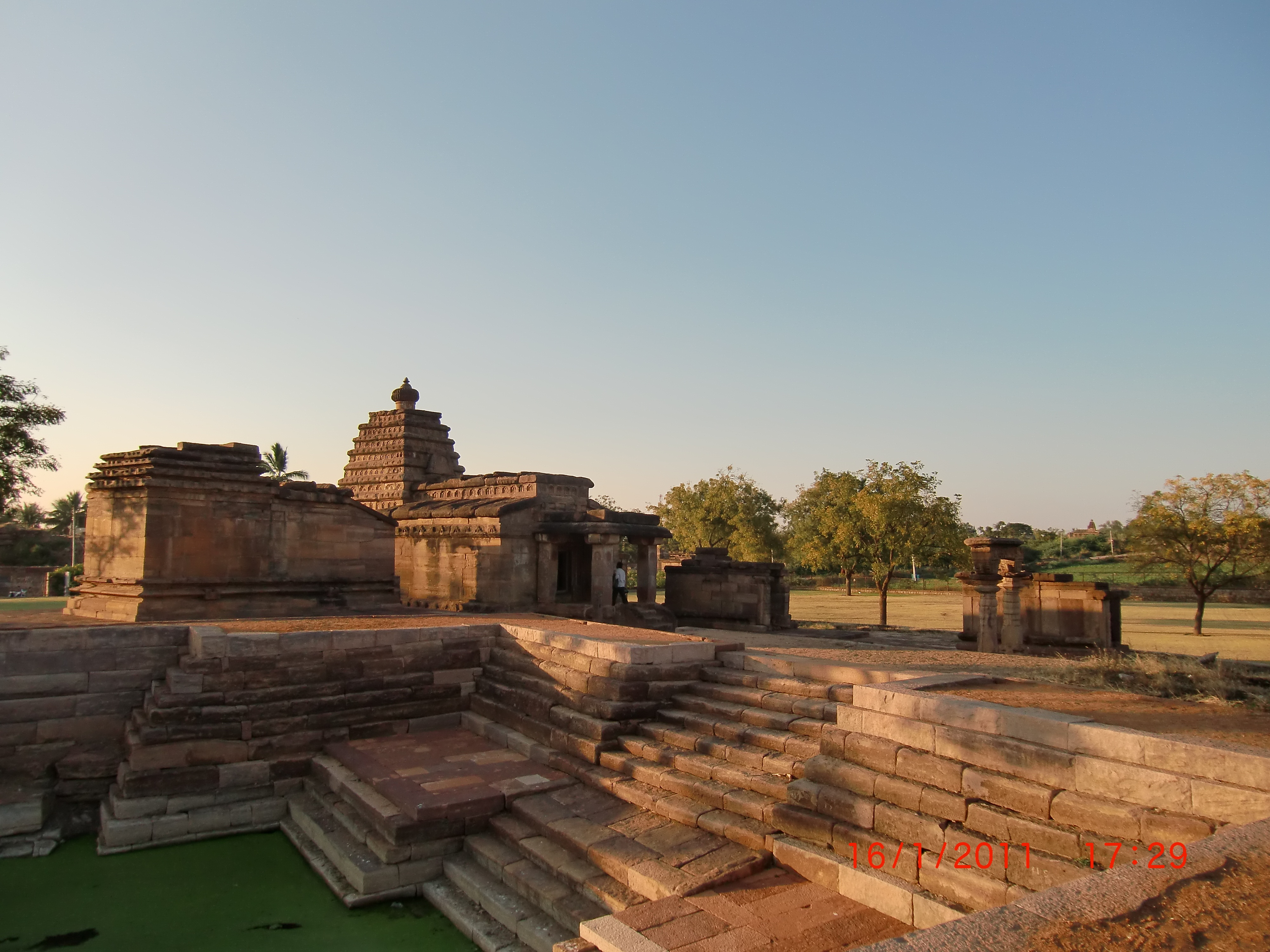
The Mallikarjuna temple complex at Aihole

The Mallikarjuna temple complex features five Hindu monuments. The main temple in this complex is dated to the Early Chalukya period, likely around 700 CE. The temple tower experimented with square mouldings of diminishing area stacked concentrically as it rose towards the sky. On top is a crowning amalaka and then kalasa (pot used in Hindu festivals and rites-of-passage functions). The smaller shrines in this complex were likely built in the Late Chalukya period.

The outer walls of the temples here are simple, clean surfaces. The walls inside of the Shiva temple, particularly the pillars are intricately carved with religious themes such as a seated Vishnu man-lion avatar Narasimha, Ganesha and Padmanidhi, as well as of daily life such as a female dancer accompanied with two female musicians with their instruments. The pillars also show amorous couples in various stages of courtship and intimacy. Many of the images inside the shrines show signs of intentional damage inside the mandapa, such as the Karegudi (black pagoda) and Bilegudi (white pagoda). The complex is dedicated to Shiva, and includes a Nandi-mandapa monument. Outside the temples, within the complex, is a carved slab of Saptamatrikas (seven mothers) of the Shaktism tradition. Near the temple, is a large stepwell as a water utility.

According to Vinayak Bharne and Krupali Krusche, the main Mallikarjuna temple illustrates with simplicity the core elements of a Hindu temple. It consists of three squares. A front square portico faces the east, invites the devotee to rise up the stairs and enter, leads him into a square sabha mandapa (public gathering space). The main mandapa links to a square sanctum, above which is the tower superstructure. The mandapa has 4 (2x2) pillars set in a square, each centred to form four circles that enclose the community hall space. The stairs at entrance too are in a square footprint, with two pillars. The larger temples similarly combine squares and circles as a generative pattern to create the temple space.

=== Ramalinga temples group ===
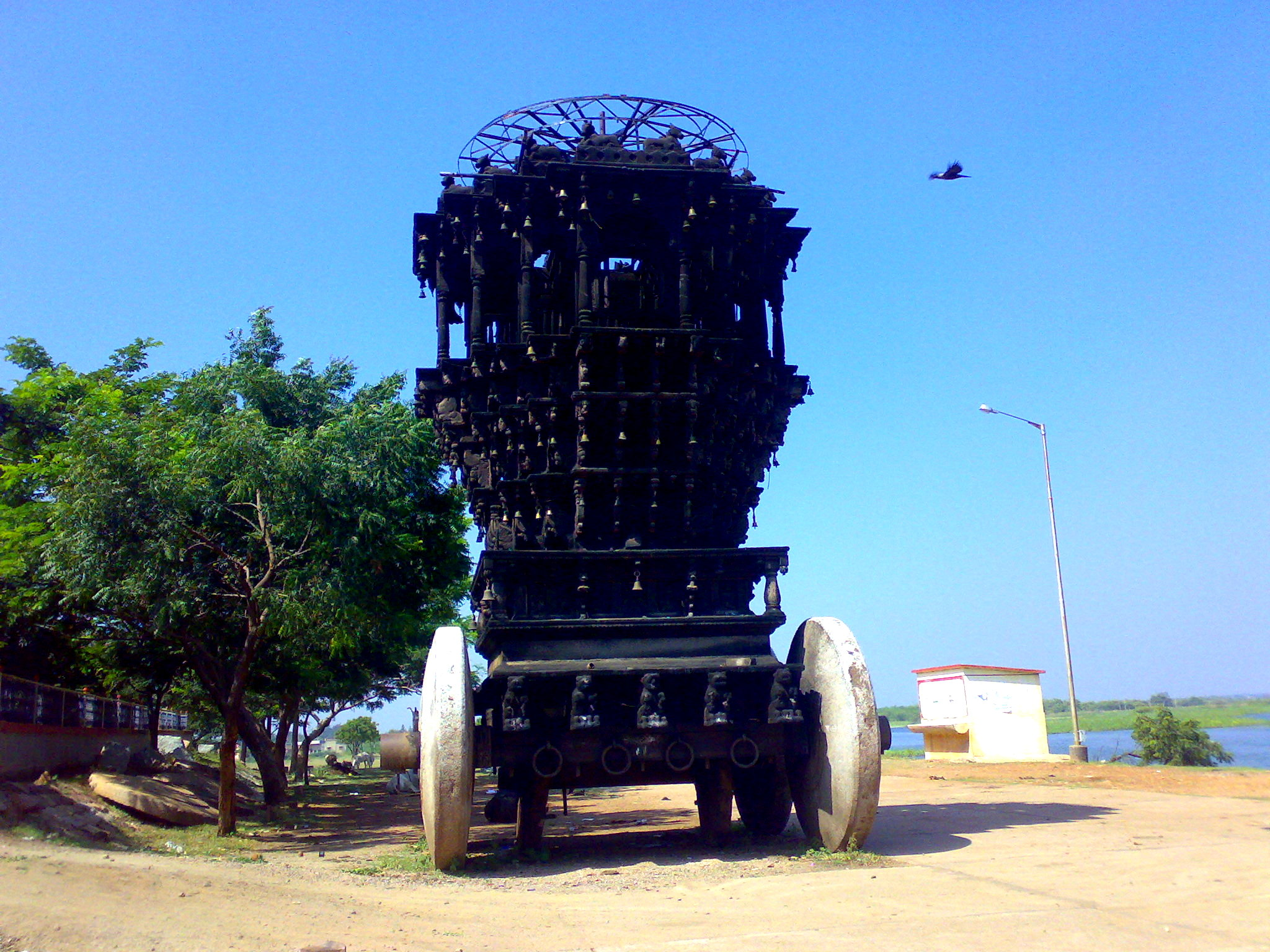
Ramalingeshwara Shiva temple's annual ratha (chariot) procession celebrates Aihole stone monuments heritage

Ramalinga complex, also called Ramalingeshvara temples, is a group of five Hindu temples. These are located on the banks of the Malaprabha river, about 2.5 kilometres south of the Durga temple complex. They are clustered close to the Veniyar and the Galaganatha monument groups in a hilly terrain.

The Ramalingeshwara temples are an active Shiva worship complex. It is periodically refurbished, whitewashed and redecorated for seasonal festivals. Its entrance has a modern wooden chariot with old stone wheels used for annual processions. The entrance portal has a Shiva Nataraja and two lions carvings, while the main temple consists of three shrines that connect with a common mandapa. Two of the shrines have pyramidal towers with shrinking squares concentrically placed, as does the main shrine, but two have their amalaka and kalasa a bit lower and intact. The mandapa is covered with a sloping stone roof. The temple incorporates an arched gate with a path to the river.

=== Veniyar shrines complex ===
The Veniyar shrines group, also called Veniyargudi, Vaniyavar, Veniyavur or Eniyar group, consists of ten Hindu temples. The Veniyar shrines are south of the village, near the river bank, close to the Ramalinga temples group. They are mostly in ruins, with substantial damage, and had a thick forest growth over them till late 20th-century. Archeological Survey of India cleared and recovered the space. A similarly named Veniyavur complex is also in the south side of the town, near Rachigudi temple. The largest temple here is an 11th-century temple. The temple has a southern entrance, though the main hall and shrine has again an east–west alignment. The pillars experiment a square base and octagonal member followed by inverted kalasha on top with square finish. The lintel has a Gajalakshmi. The hall consists of two fused squares (6.5'x13'). The door frame to the sanctum has tiny carvings, and the temple has some of the most miniature carvings of themes in Aihole.

The Veniyar temples are dated to between the 9th and the 11th century, and represented a breakthrough in experiments by Aihole medieval artists to balance stone weight that the foundation and pillars could support while arranging a functional form, space and light within the temple consistent with the theological ideas. The so-called Temple number 5 of the Veniyar group combined function and form, creating a much taller madhyashala than any previous Aihole temple and a two-storey sanctum temple structure by nesting the stones. A simpler idea but with less fruitful results were tried in the triple Jaina temple found in Aihole village.

=== Galaganatha temples group ===
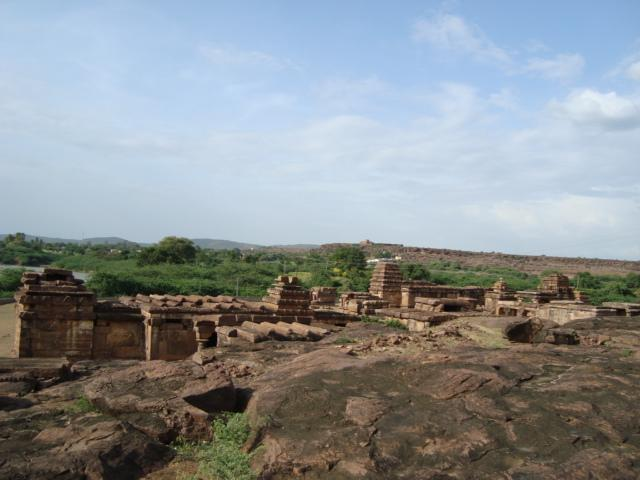
The group

The Galaganatha group of temples, also referred to as Galagnath temples, is a large cluster of over thirty medieval Hindu temples and monuments on the bank of the Malaprabha River in Aihole. It is located about 2.5 kilometres south of the Durga temple and ASI museum complex, near the river dam, close to the Veniyar and Ramalinga shrines. The Galaganatha group of temples are dated to between 7th and 12th centuries.

The Galagnath temples compound has three main sub-clusters, almost all aligned in east–west direction. Most are partly or wholly in ruins with signs of intentional damage, but the remnants standing have significant details and artwork. The main shrine of the Galaganatha complex is dedicated to Shiva, yet has Brahma, Vishnu and Durga artwork integral in its mandapa. The Shiva panel from its ceiling, along with several of its artwork has been moved to a Mumbai museum. This main temple is from Early Chalukya period (6th or 7th century), has a Kadamba-Nagara style pyramidal shikhara of shrinking squares concentrically placed. It includes images of river goddesses Ganga and Yamuna at the entrance to this shrine. A few other notable temples in this complex that remain in reasonably preserved shape and form include one with a nearly complete 9th-century temple with South Indian Dravida style tower, another with North Indian Rekhanagara style tower.

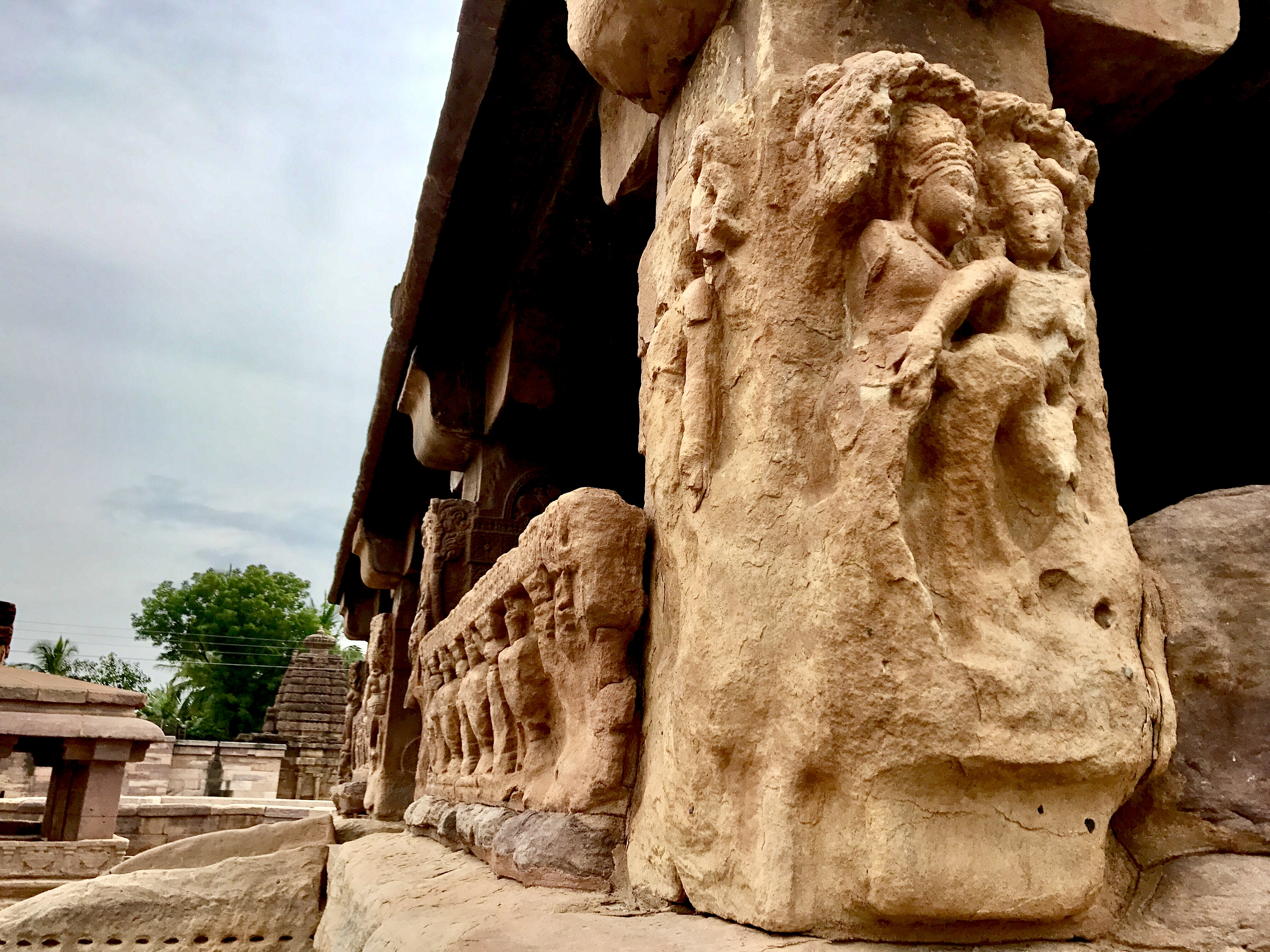
Exterior sculpture

The artwork found in the Aihole Galaganatha temple complex includes various styles of auspicious pot motifs (now common in Hindu ceremonies), Durga, Harihara, Maheshvari, Saptamatrikas, mythical makaras, foliage and flowers, birds, and others. The Galaganatha temples complex is the site where archaeologists found the 7th-century complete life-size nude Lajja Gauri in birthing position and with a lotus head, now at ASI Aihole museum near the Durga temple.

The Galaganatha temples, states Ajay Sinha – professor of Art History, show evidence of unfinished wall panels in addition to the abundance of panels that represent the secular local folklore and social life as well as the religious mythologies and deities. The Galaganatha complex has a diversity of temples and styles with a pastiche effect, states Sinha, which is perhaps evidence of "the degree to which interaction of architectural ideas was taking place in this period in this merchantile town".

=== Maddin temples group ===
The Maddin cluster consists of four Hindu temples. It is one of the groups that is in the heart of the village, midst homes and sheds. The largest temple faces north, and has two small linked shrines on its east and west. The temple experiments with different pillar designs.

The main mandapa of the largest Maddin temple is square and supported on four pillars made of stone unlike others used in Aihole, a greenish colour stone that is not local and was imported from somewhere else, possibly from Dharwad region of the Deccan. The artists polished it, moulded a square base and then lathe-turned it intricately all the way to its neck in a manner similar to Hoyasala designs. The temple features a Nataraja, the dancing Shiva with a damaru in his right hand and trishula in the left. Near him is an intricately carved lion. In distance, facing the Shiva linga is seated Nandi in the antarala of the temple. On the lintel of the sanctum is Gajalakshmi.

The towers of the Maddin temples are all stepped pyramidal concentric squares.

=== Triyambakeshvara temples group ===
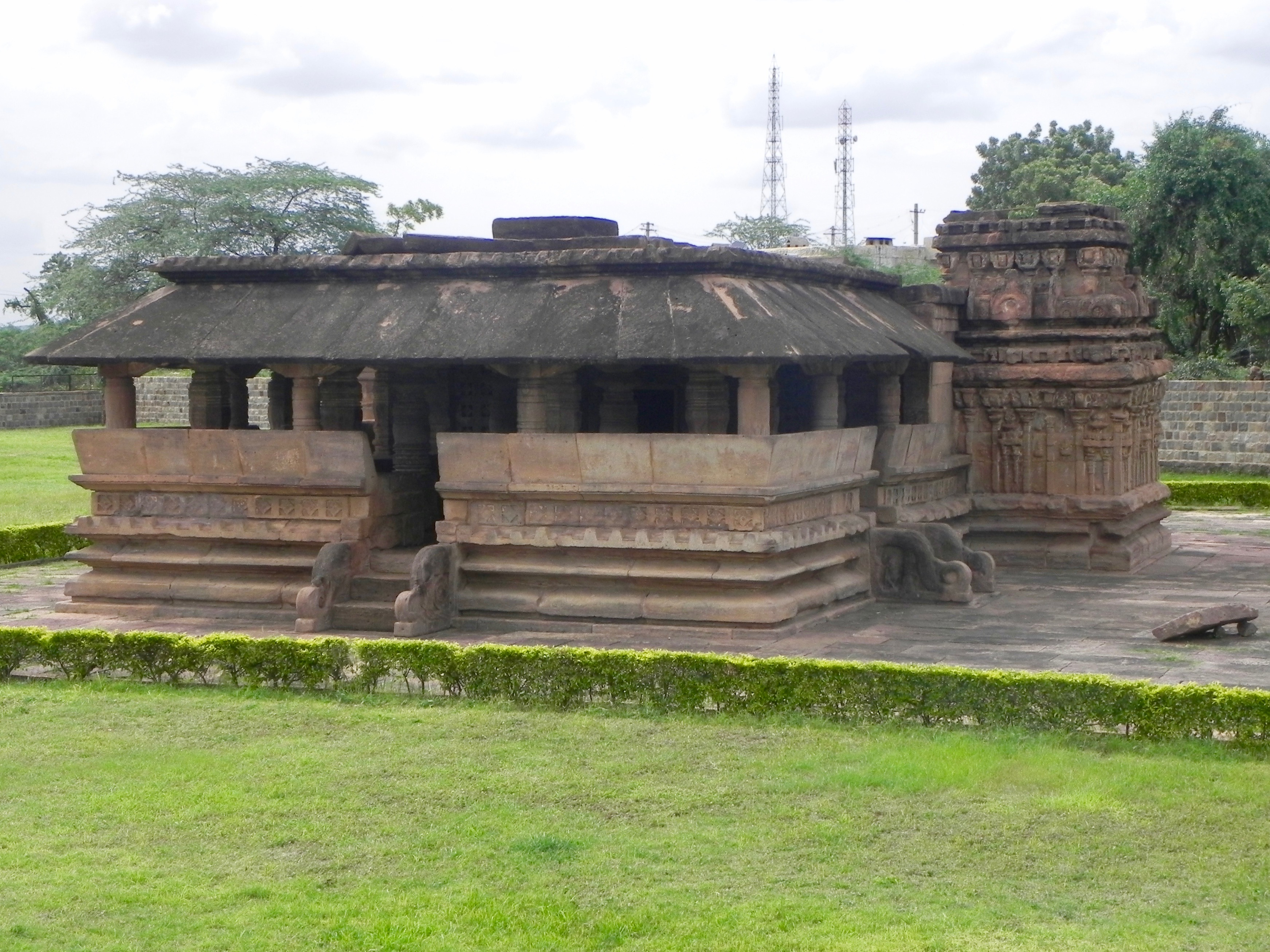
Rachigudi Temple of the Triyambakeshvara Group

The Triyambakeshvara group, also spelled Triambakesvara group, has five Hindu temples. It is within the village. The main temple of this group faces south and is set on a high platform. Two smaller connected shrines are to its east and west. Stone steps lead to an open mandapa, a sabha mandapa (community hall) which connects to the sanctum. The open portico has two square pillars and two pilasters. The lintel on the entrance has Gajalakshmi. The sabha mandapa is square (15.6'x15.6'), itself supported on four square moulded pillars set within the space in a square, while the side walls have twelve pilasters. The upper part of the four square pillars are circular. It is connected to an antechamber and the sanctum. The sanctum is dedicated to Shiva linga, while a near life-size Nandi sits facing the sanctum inside the shrine. On the lintel to the sanctum is carved another Gajalakshmi (Lakshmi with two elephants spraying water). The damaged towers of the main and the attached smaller shrines are all stepped pyramid of shrinking concentric squares as the tower rises towards the sky.

Two smaller temples in the Triyambakeshvara group are the Desiyar temple and the Rachigudi temple. Both feature a square main community ceremony hall, but different roof than the main temple of this group. The Desiyar temple has a seated, lotus-holding Lakshmi carved on the entrance. It has a bhumi-style tower, and has a Nandi sitting outside. The Rachigudi features a sloping stone roof of the style now found in Hindu temples of southwestern India. The outside wall has floral and other carvings. The temple consists of the main shrine, plus two subsidiary shrines to its east and west. The inside of the Rachigudi temple is a square layout, set on square base pillars with rounded moulded shaft supporting the roof and a moulded inverted kalasha pot-like shape at its top. The portico of the temple is square (17' × 17'), is of kakasanas style with eight squat pillars, again with square base, followed by an exploration of octagonal form. The Rachigudi has some intricately carved artwork inside, such as of Gajalakshmi on the lintel. The door jambs explore floral and geometric designs, as do the small perforated windows in the sabha mandapa integrated to bring light into the temple. The Triyambakeshvara group including the Rachigudi Hindu temple is from the 10th to 11th centuries, bridging the Rashtrakuta and Late Chalukya periods.

=== Kuntigudi complex ===
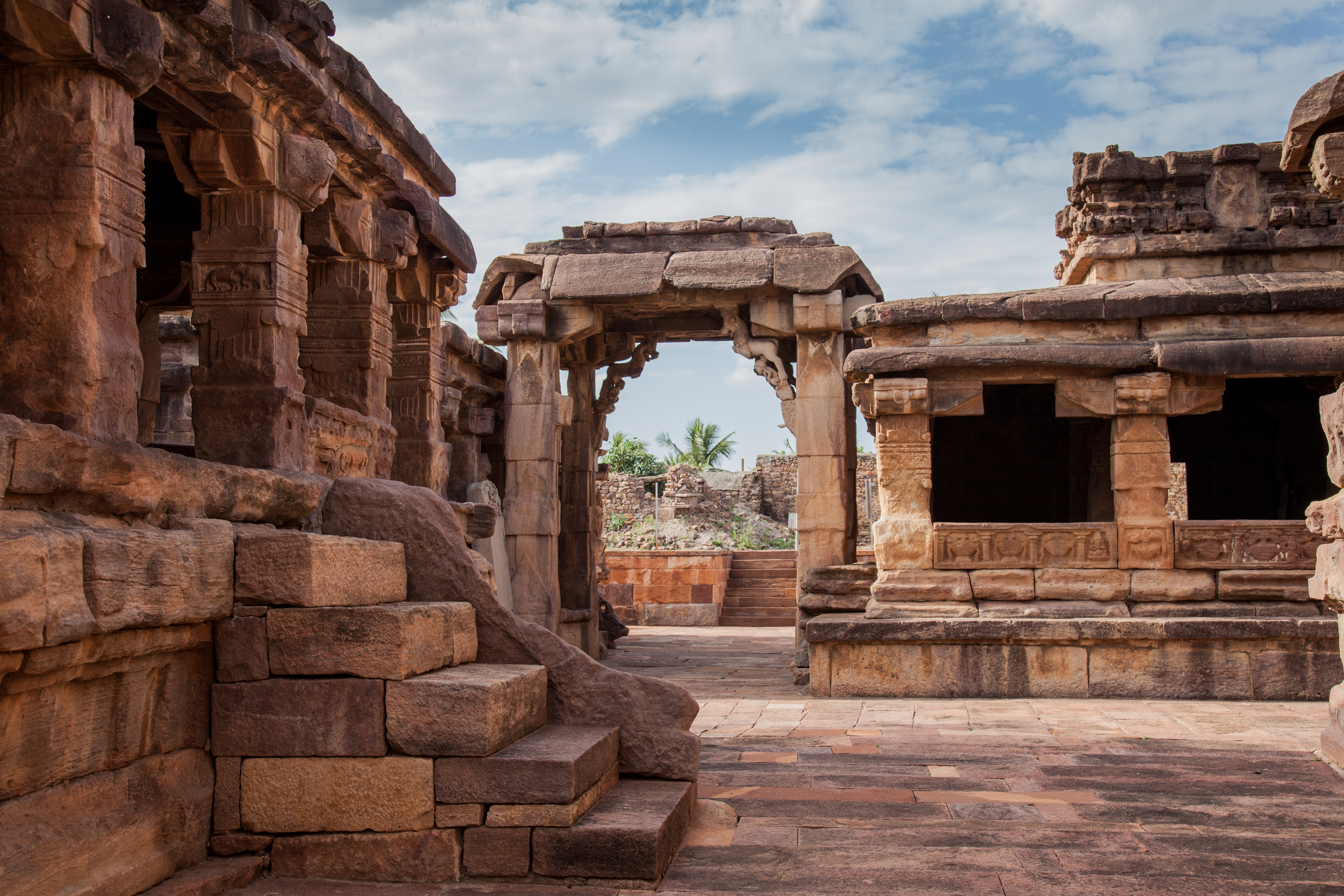
Kunti group colonnade

The Kunti group of monuments, also referred to as the Konti-gudi group, consist of four Hindu temples. They are situated in the middle of an Aihole market street with temple walls between the houses and sheds. Gupte dates the temples to the 6th century, while Michell states some of the monuments are more likely from the 8th century. The temples feature a veranda and garbha-grihya (sanctum) without enclosed walls.

The temples have an entrance colonnade with square pillars and porch with carvings that have eroded with time. The carvings include natural themes and amorous couples (for example, man cuddles a woman's shoulder as she lovingly caresses him with one hand and holds him with other both looking at each other). Inside the main temple is a mandapa with carvings of Vaishnavism, Shaivism and Shaktism traditions. The artwork presents unusual perspective such as the top view of Vishnu as he sleeps on Sesha, without Lakshmi, but with chakra and conch not in his hand but on the top edge of the bed; Shiva in yoga asana with Parvati seated on his side and her hand on his thigh; three-headed Brahma holding a pasha and kamandalu seated on lotus rather than Hamsa; Durga killing demon buffalo but from an unusual perspective. Similarly one of the pillars a damaged artwork with eight hands (mostly broken), probably Shiva, but who unusually carries trishul (Shaivism), chakra (Vaishnavism) and dhanus (Rama, Vaishnavism). Goddess Uma is shown in one carving as wearing a yajnopavita (along with Shiva with him). The temples also present standing Vishnu avatar Narasimha, Ardhanarishvara (Shiva-Parvati fusion), Nataraja, Gajalakshmi, Ganesha, standing Shiva with pearl yajnopavita, Vedic gods Agni, Indra, Kubera, Ishana, Vayu, and others.

=== Other Gudis ===
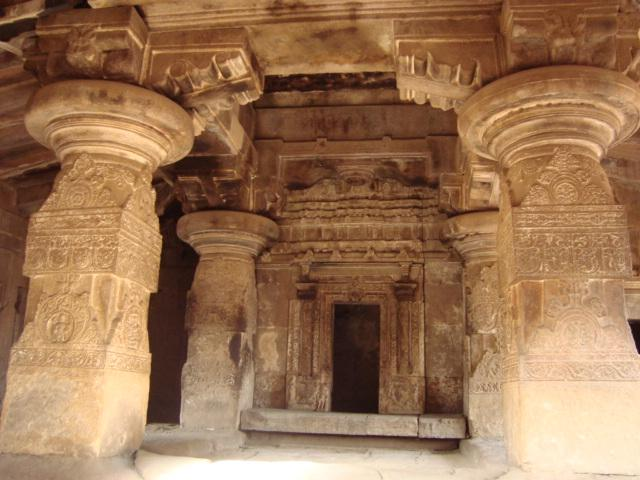
Gauri temple mandapa, Aihole

- Chikkigudi group is at a short distance to the north of the Ambigeragudi group (7th–8th century; according to Michell, main temple has "exuburent sculptures in the interior" treasured within a plain simple outside; detailed artwork of Trivikrama Vishnu, Nataraja Shiva, Brahma-Vishnu-Mahesh Hindu trinity and others)
- Tarabasappa temple (6th-7th century, earliest separation of sanctum from the main gathering hall)
- Hucchimalli temple (operating in late 6th century per 708 CE inscription, an intricate carving of Kartikeya, Shaivism tradition)
- Aralibasappa temple (9th century, Ganga and Yamuna river goddesses carving, Shaivism tradition)
- Gauri temple (12th century, intricately carved Durga, Shaiva and Vaishnava carvings and images, now Shaktism tradition but may have belonged to the Vaishnava then Shaiva tradition earlier)
- Sangameshwara temple and Siddanakolla (6th–8th century, Saptamatrikas and Lajja Gauri of the Shaktism tradition)

== Buddhist monuments ==
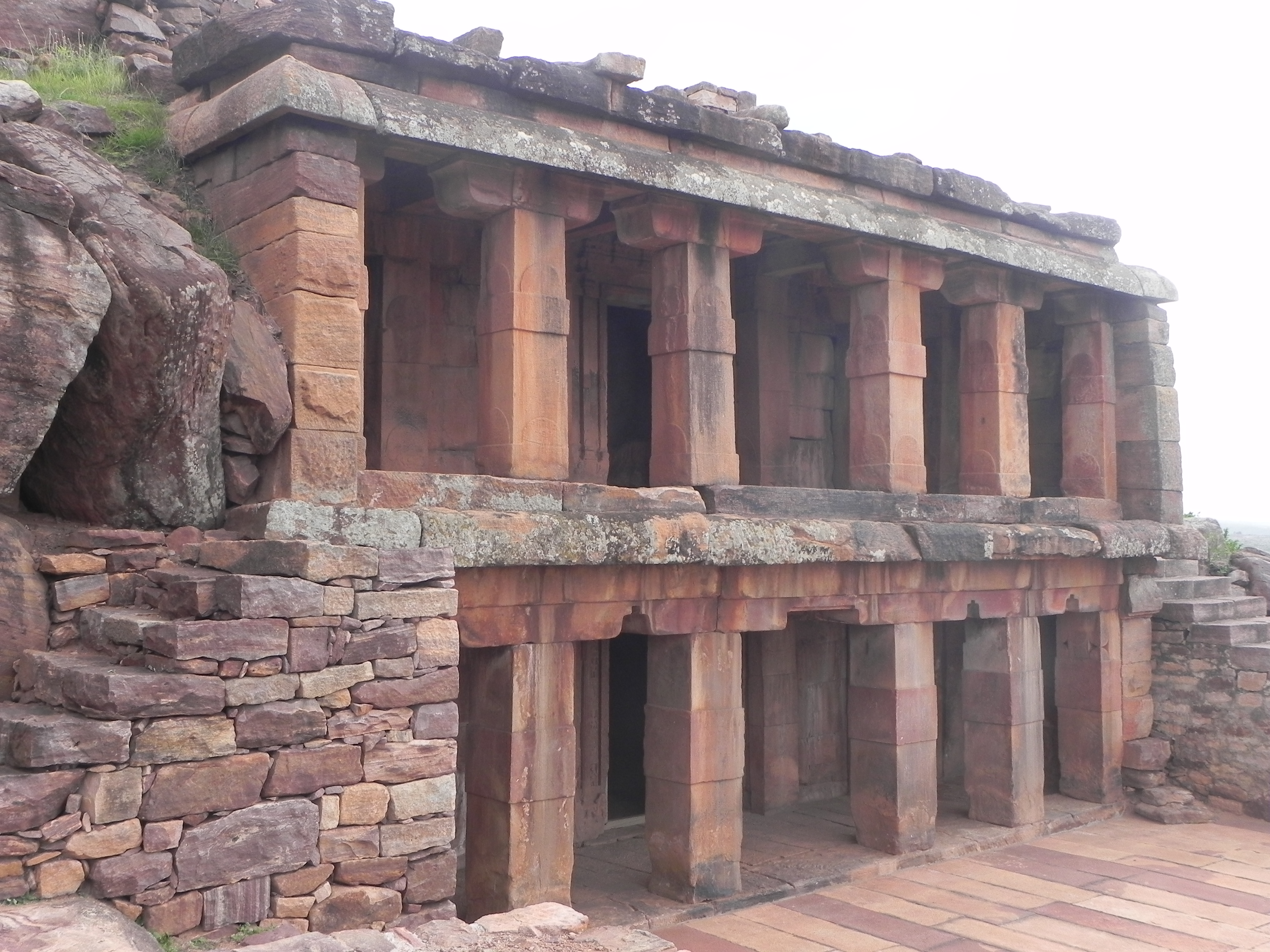
Two storeyed Buddhist temple in Aihole

There is one Buddhist monument in Aihole, on the Meguti hill. It is a partly rock-cut two-storeyed temple, a few steps below the crest of the hill and the Jain Meguti hill temple. In front of the temple is a damaged Buddha statue, one without a head, probably taken out from inside the temple. The two levels of the temple are open and feature four full carved square pillars and two partial pillars on two side walls. Each pair of pillar goes into the hill to form a small monastery like chamber. The doorway to the lower level chamber is intricately carved, while the central bay on the upper level has a Buddha relief showing him seated under a parasol. The temple is dated to late 6th-century.

== Jain monuments ==
Aihole preserves four collection of about ten Jain monuments from the 6th to 12th century CE, associated with the Meena Basti (also referred to as Mina Basadi). These are found on the Meguti hill, Chanranthi matha, Yoginarayana complex and an early Jaina cave temple.

=== Meguti hill ===
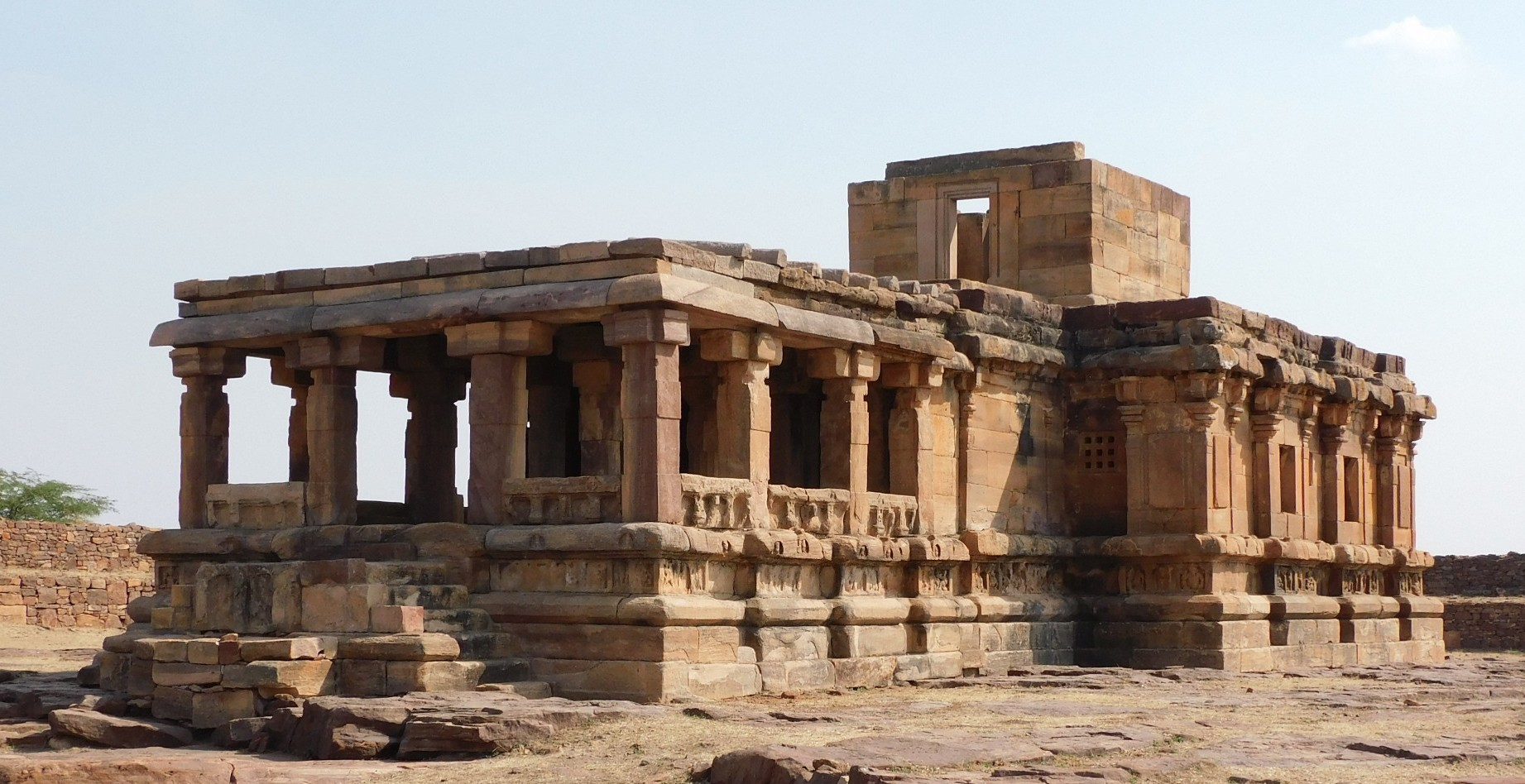
Meguti hill Jain temple

The Meguti Jain temple is on the level-topped Meguti hill, surrounded by the Aihole fort. The north-facing temple is dedicated to a Jain Tirthankara Mahavira. The word "Meguti" is a corruption of the word "Megudi" and means "upper temple".

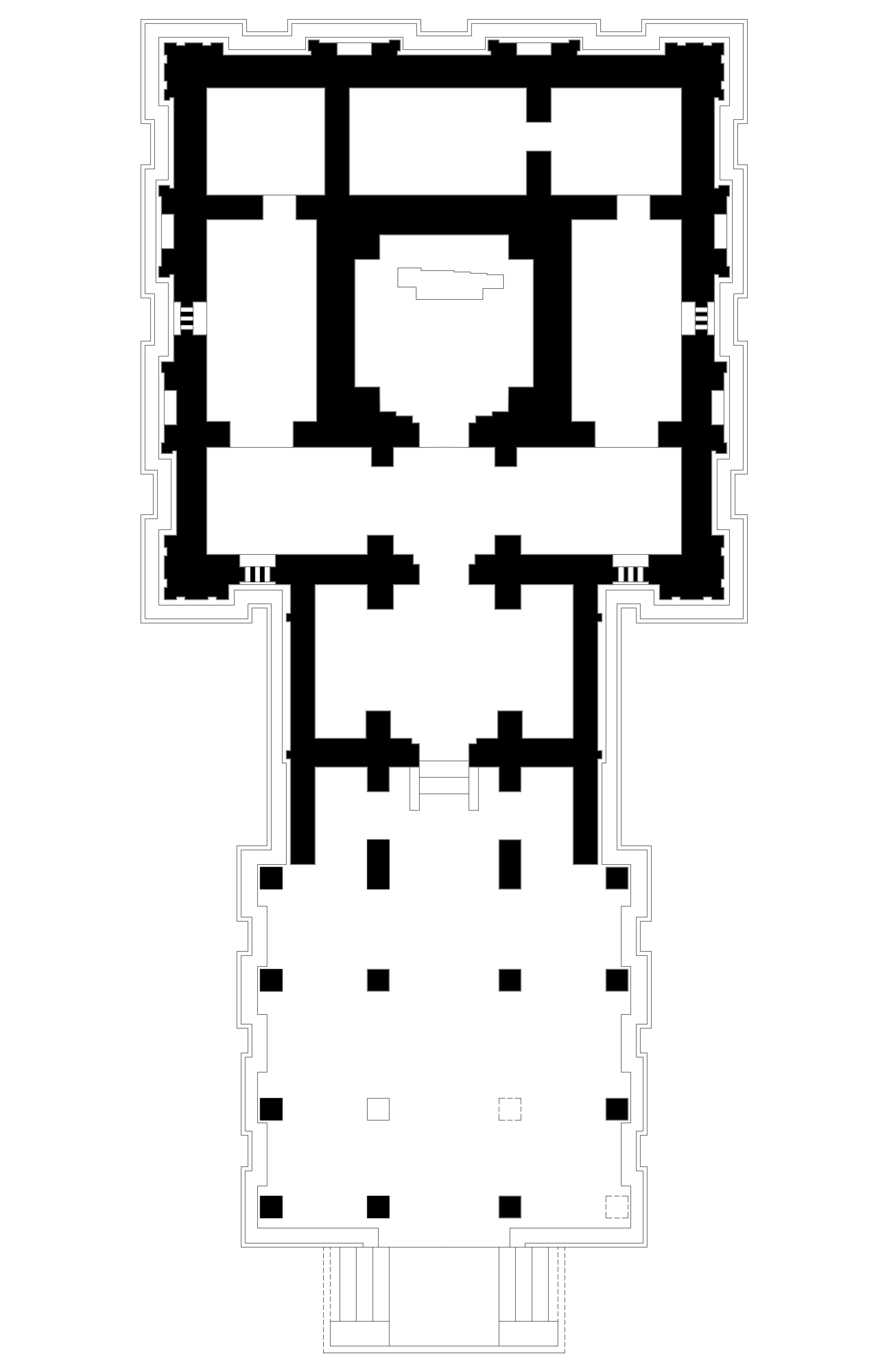
Floor plan of Meguti temple.

The temple has an open portico, leading the devotee into a mandapa and the sanctum. The entire temple sits on a raised platform like many of the Hindu temples in the village. However, the layout inside is distinct. It has a pillared square mukhya-mandapa (main hall), which enters into a narrower square antarala divided into two compartments at different levels. A stair connects the slightly higher level, which leads to the larger square-shaped chamber and sanctum. This section consists of two concentric squares, the inner square being the sanctum, and the space between the outer square and inner square being the pradakshina patha (circumambulation path). However, in the back of this path, a later construction sealed the circumambulation passage, making it more suitable for storage. Inside the inner square is a relatively crude carving of a Tirthankara. In contrast to the crudeness of this carving is the intricate carving of Ambika with attendant female Jaina deities and her lion mount below of the temple, now preserved in the ASI museum in Aihole. A similar carving is found attending the Mahavira in Jain Ellora Caves, and it is therefore likely that this temple was a dedication to the Mahavira. The temple includes a stone stair connecting the lower level to its upper. Though badly damaged, the upper level has a Jain image. It is also a viewpoint to look over the fort as well to watch the Aihole village below.

The temple foundation moldings rhythmically project the plastered walls of the temple. The temple is not complete, as the niches and walls where carvings would be, are either cut but empty or left uncut and left raised. The temple had a tower, but it is lost and has been replaced by a rooftop watch room like empty chamber added much later and that does not flow with the rest of temple. The mouldings around the foundation have carvings of Jaina motifs such as seated Jinas meditating.

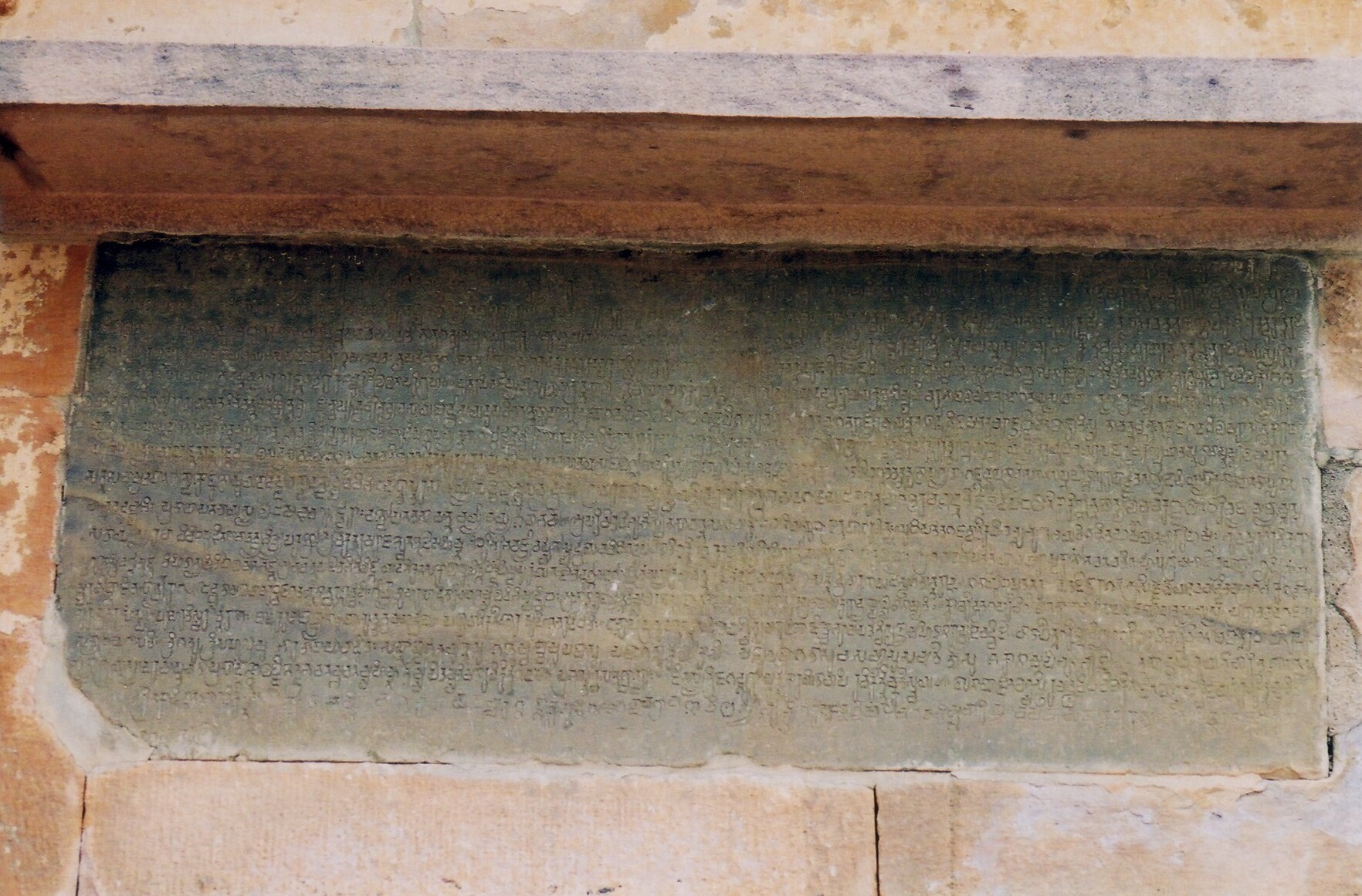
Aihole Sanskrit inscription from 634 CE.

==== Meguti Aihole inscription ====
The Meguti temple is historically important for its Aihole Prashasti inscription. A slab on the outer east side wall of the temple is inscribed in Sanskrit language and Old Kannada script. It is dated to Saka 556 (634 CE), and is a poem by Jain poet Ravikirti. He was in the court of king Pulakeshin II. This inscription opens with the equivalent of "Jai Jinendra" salutation in Sanskrit. The inscription is a panegyric by the Jain poet wildly praising his patron Pulakesin II, comparing him to Hindu deities and Kalidasa legends, thanking him for his support in the construction of the Meguti Jain temple.

=== Jain cave temple ===
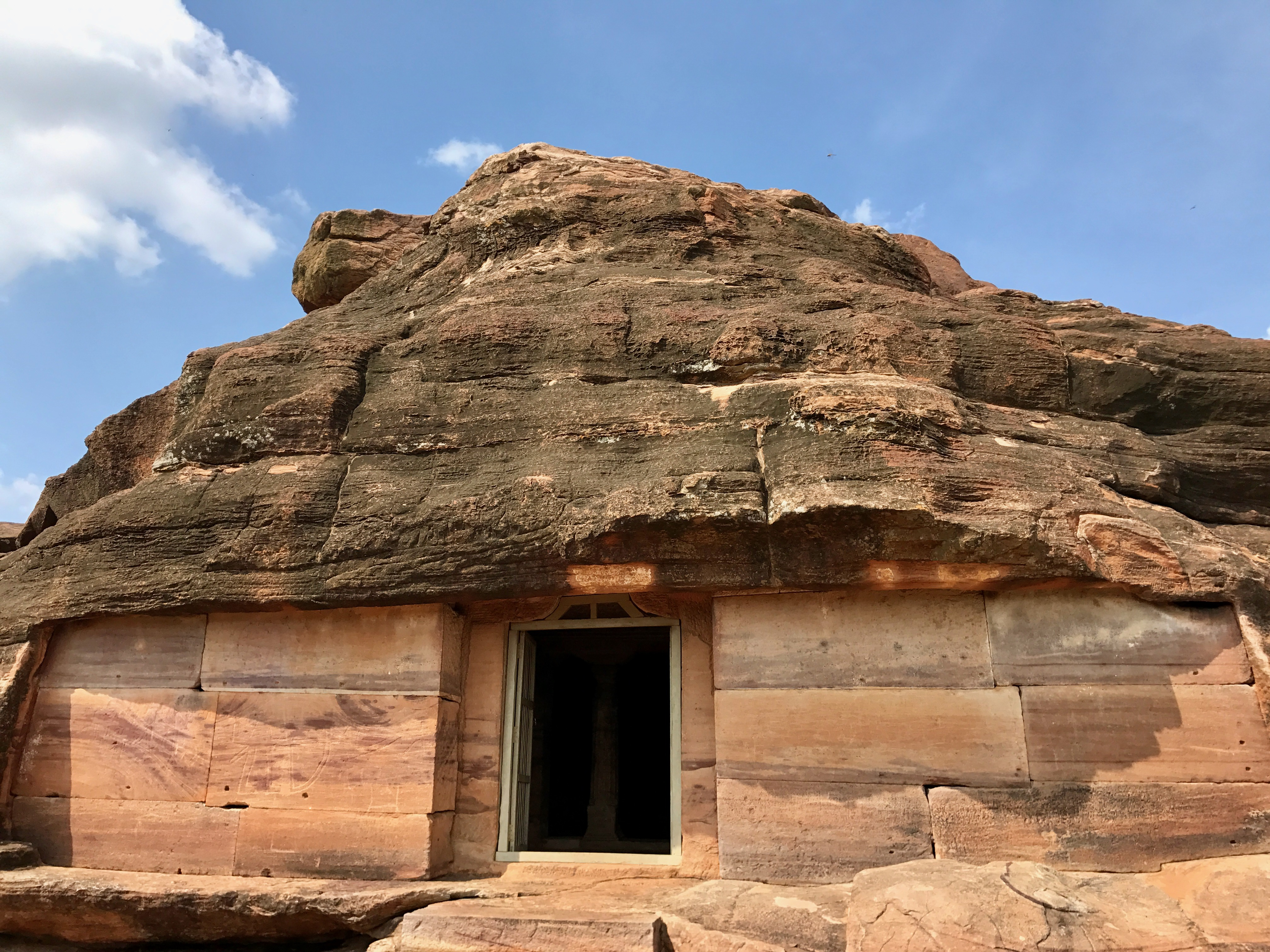
7th–8th century Jain cave temple.

The Jain cave temple is to the south of village, on the Meguti hill. It is likely from the late 6th century or early 7th. The outside is plain, but the cave is intricately embellished inside. The carvings carry symbolic Jain motifs, such as the mythical giant makaras disgorging tiny humans and lotus petals decorations. Inside its vestibule, on each side are two major reliefs of Parshvanatha with snake canopy above him and Bahubali with vines wrapped around his two legs. Both these images have female attendants next to them. The vestibule leads to the sanctum, flanked by two armed guards who also hold lotuses, with an enthroned seated inside. The cave has a side chamber, where too is a seated Jina surrounded by mostly female devotees with offerings and worship position.

=== Yoginarayana group ===
Another cluster of Jain monuments is the Yoginarayana group, near the Gauri temple. It consists of four temples, dedicated to the Mahavira and the Parshvanatha. Two face the north, one west, and another east, all likely from the 11th century. The pillars of the temples have intricate carvings. Their towers are same as the stepped squares found in Hindu pyramidal-style shikaras in Aihole. This collection has a polished basalt image of Parshvanatha, with a five-headed snake hood. He sits on a platform with lions carved in its niches. Another image from this Jain temples cluster is now at the ASI museum in Aihole.

=== Charanthi matha group ===
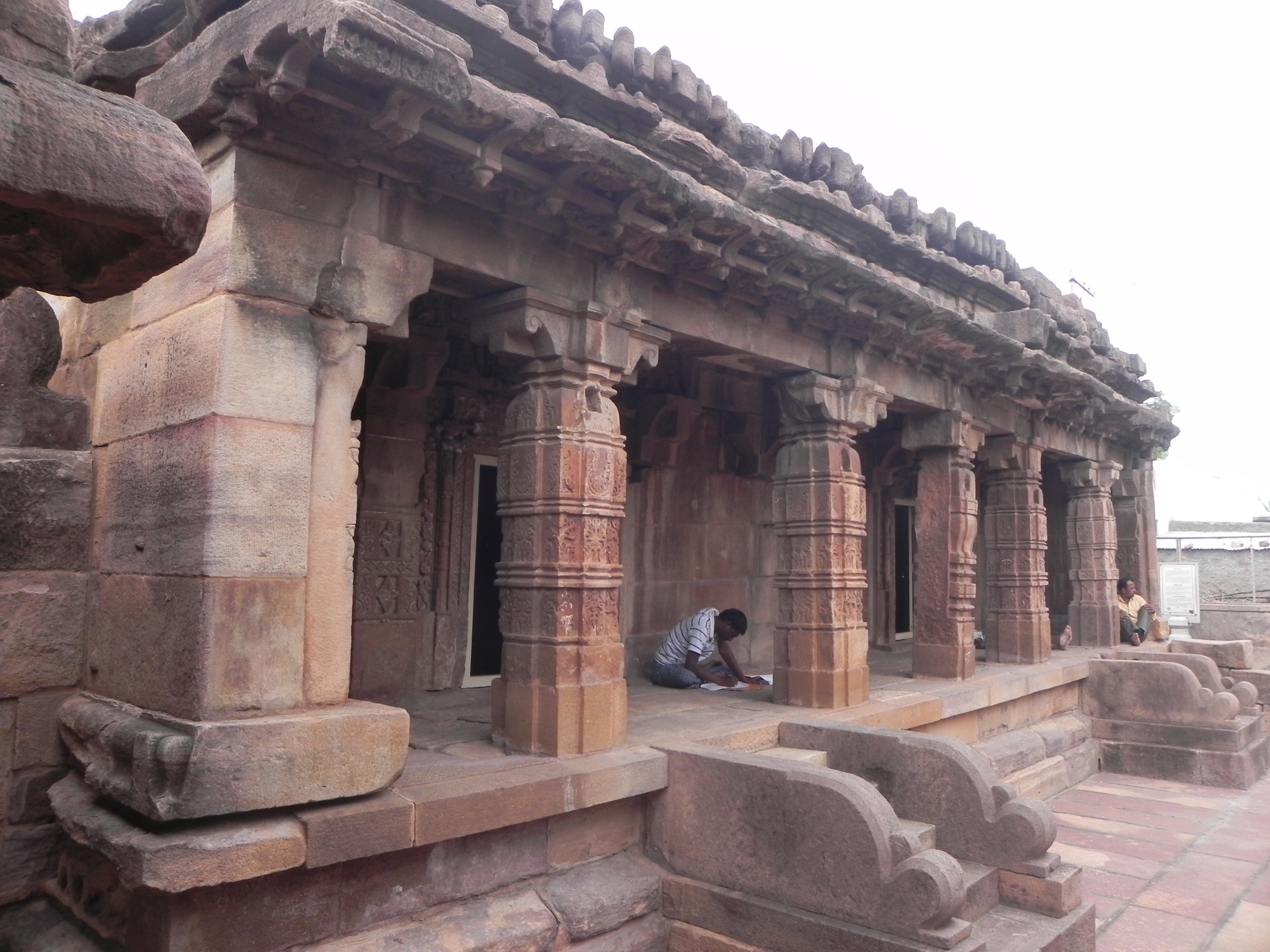
A Chanranthi math Jain temple.

The Charanthi matha group consists of three Jain temples and is dated to the 12th century CE. It features the Late Chalukya style.

The main Jain temple in the Charanthi matha group faces north. It is flanked by two smaller shrines, while it consists of a portico, an almost-square mandapa (16 ft × 17 ft), an antarala, sanctum. The mandapa entrance has the image of Mahavira with two female attendants, inside are four pillars laid out in a square pattern, and the design on them look similar to pillars found in nearby Hindu temples. At the entrance of the antarala is another image of the Mahavira. The square antechamber leads to sanctum where there is another image of the Mahavira seated in the padmasana yoga position, on a lion throne flanked by two attendants. The smaller shrines also feature the Mahavira. The tower above the Charanthi matha group temples are stepped shrinking concentric squares pyramidal style.

The second and third temple in the Charanthi matha group faces south. These share a common veranda. The temples resemble monastic sanctuaries. A six-bay veranda connects to these two, and the doorways have miniature Jinas carved on the lintels. The pillars of these temples are ornately carved, and both are dedicated to the Mahavira.

The matha consists of twin basadi with one porch serving both, with each housing 12 Tirthankars. An inscription here records the date of construction as 1120 CE.

== Other monuments ==
=== Aihole dolmens and inscriptions ===
Scattered in the prehistoric period megalithic site behind the Meguti temple are many dolmens, numbering about 45 and more are destroyed by treasure hunters. Local people call it Morera mane (Morera tatte) or Desaira Mane. Each dolmen has three sides upright square slabs and large flat slab on top forms roof, front side upright slab had circular hole.

=== Inscriptions ===
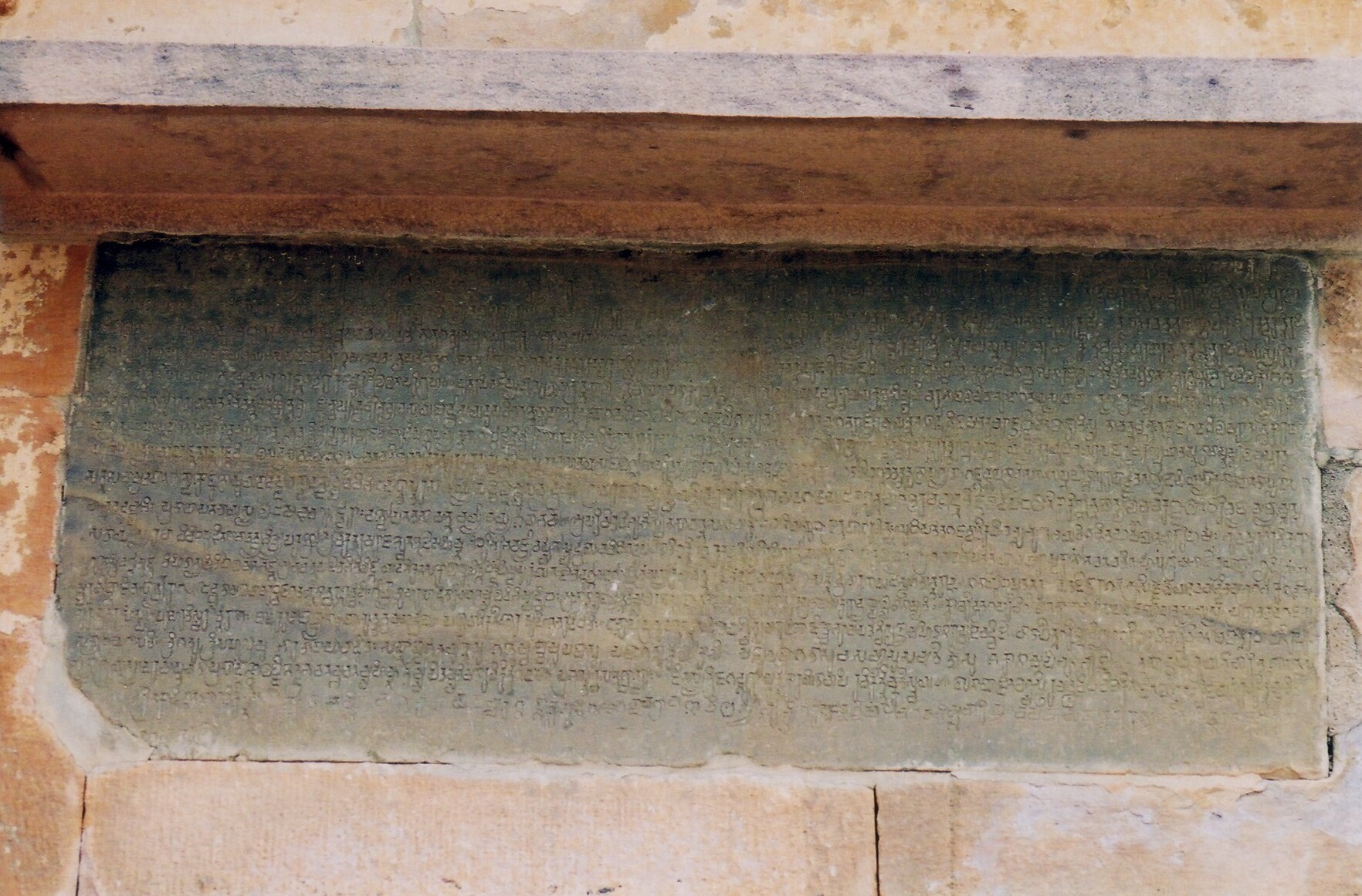
Aihole inscription: poetry on stone at the Meguti temple Aihole

Many inscriptions are found at Aihole, the inscription at the Meguti Temple, popularly known as Aihole inscription, or Aihole Prashasti, is the most important and is a eulogy to the Chalukya king Pulakeshi-II. Written by the royal poet, Ravikirti, the inscription praises the Chalukya king in verse. Though using the Sanskrit language, the inscription uses the Kannada script.

The inscription details the military victories of Pulikeshi II. His defeat of King Harshavardhana, his victory over the Pallavas, Mangalesha's (Paramabhagavat) victory over the Kalachuris, and the conquest of Revatidvipa (Present-day Redi Port). It also mentions the shifting of the capital from Aihole to Badami by Pulikeshi-II. The poet Kalidasa is also mentioned in the inscription. Another inscription at Aihole, that of Amoghavarsha I, mentions his new administration (navarajyam geyye).

Chalukya Territories during Pulakeshi II c. 640 C.E.

== Significance ==
The Hindu temples at Aihole reflect a "meeting and fragmentation of styles", one that became a creative cradle for new experiments in construction and architecture yielding their local variants, states George Michell. These ideas ultimately influenced and became a part of both the northern and southern styles of Hindu arts. They are also a possible mirror to early wood-based temples whose natural decay led to innovations with stone, where the early stone temples preserved the heritage, the form and the function of their timber ancestors. The early temples at Aihole may also be a window into the more ancient Indian society, where temples were built around and integrated into the "santhagara village meeting hall" as the mandapa.

The Aihole temples are built at different levels, likely because the river Malaprabha flooded and its path changed over its history. The more ancient temples have a lower level. This is evidenced by the limited excavations done by Rao near the foundation of a few select temples where red polished ware have been found. These ceramic ware pieces are dated to between 1st century BCE and 4th century CE, and likely deposited with silt around the older temples during river floods. Extensive excavation studies at the Aihole done have not been done, but the studies so far suggest that the site preserves archaeologically significant information.

The Jain temples of Aihole are significant in helping decipher the spread, influence, and interaction of Jainism and Hinduism traditions in the Deccan region. According to Lisa Owen, the comparison of the artwork in Aihole-Badami Jain monuments and other sites such as the Ellora Caves, particularly the attendants, deities, and demons provides a means to decipher the development of Jain mythology and the significance of the shared iconography.

== See also ==
- Badami Chalukya Architecture
- Pattadakal
- Mahakuta group of temples
- List of State Protected Monuments in Karnataka
- Chalukya dynasty
- Badami Chalukya Architecture
- Five Hundred Lords of Ayyavolu
- Aihole inscriptions
- Sudi
- Gajendragad
- Ainnurruvar
- Indian rock-cut architecture
