= Agastya Lake =

Sacred lake in Badami, India

Coordinates: 15°55′11.3″N 75°41′11.5″E

Agasthya lake
- Agastya lake or Vatapi lake
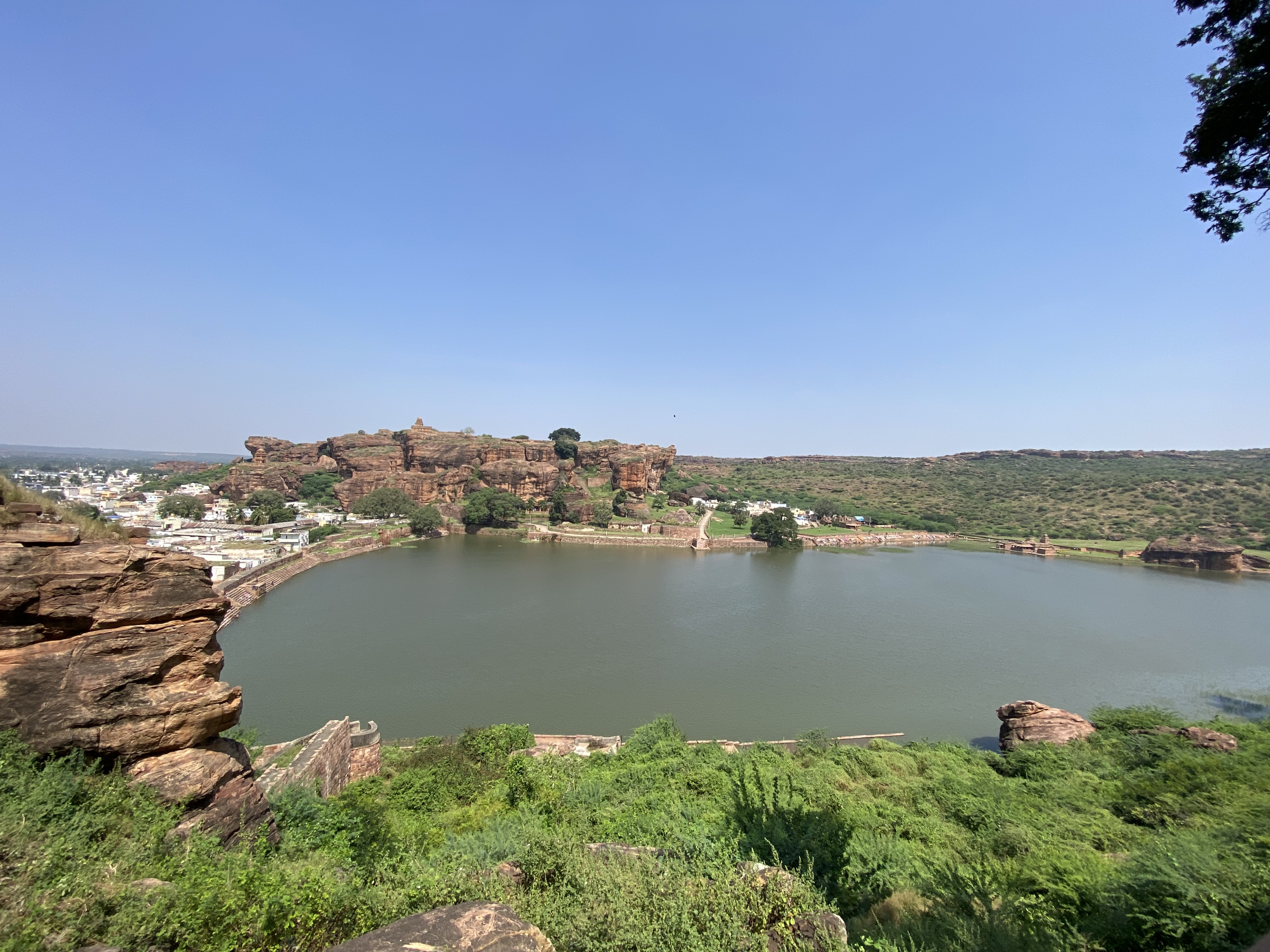
- Interactive map of Agasthya lake
- Location: Badami
- Type: Artificial lake
- Etymology: Agastya
- Built: 5th-7th century

Agastya lake, also sometimes written as Agasthya lake or referred to as Vatapi lake, is an artificial lake built c. 5th-7th century in Badami, Karnataka, South India. It is a popular tourist spot, as it is overlooked by the Badami cave temples.

The name Vatapi lake comes from the fact that Badami was previously called Vatapi.

== Holiness ==
According to Hinduism, the sage Agastya was the one that created the lake, thus giving the name. He was a revered sage of the religion.

The Mahabharata, a book that frequently talks about Agastya, mentions the lake:

When he reaches Agastya's lake, a man, devoted to the worship of Gods and ancestors, who stays there for three nights, obtains the fruit of the Laud of the Fire.

— Vyasa, Mahabharata

The meaning of "the fruit of the Laud of Fire" is unknown.

The water of the lake is considered to be holy due to the origins of the lake. As such, it is frequently used to wash clothes.

== Structure ==
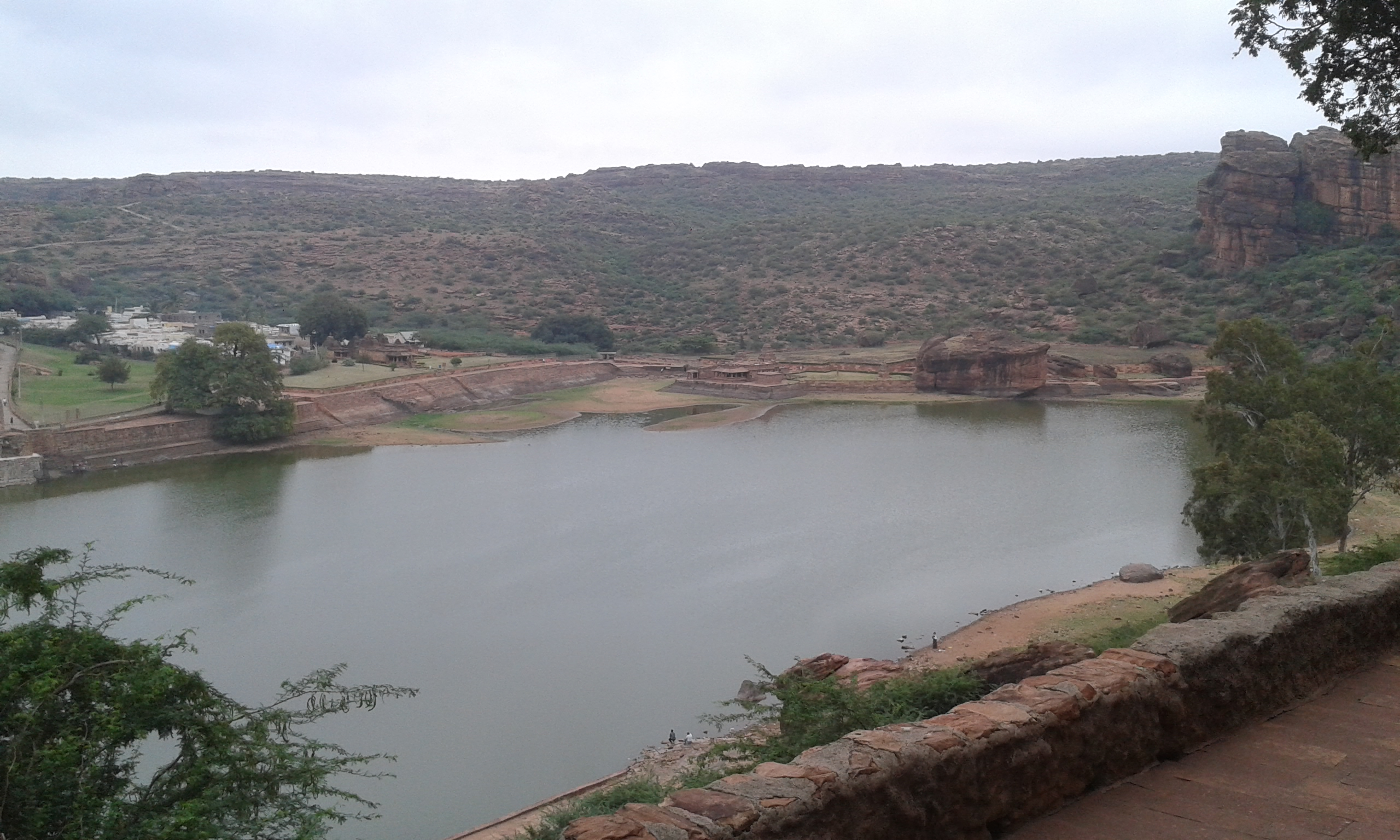
View of the lake from the cave temples.

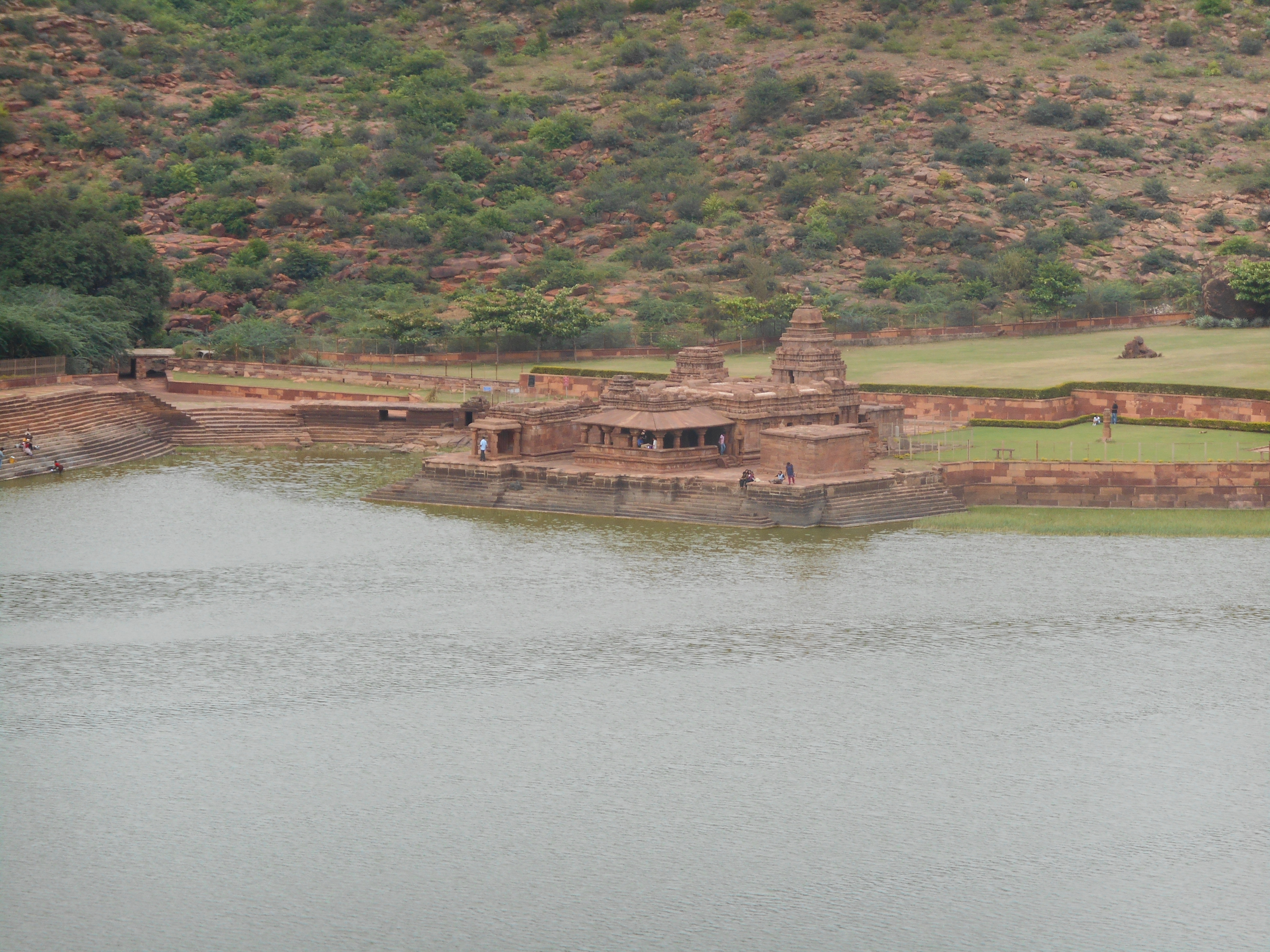
Bhutanatha group of temples, surrounded by the lake.

The lake is fully surrounded by the Badami cave temples. On its east coast, the Bhutanatha group of temples is located. Most of Badami's temples are located nearby or surrounding the lake.

The lake is a tourist spot precisely because it is overlooked by the cave temples, providing a view.

=== Method of construction ===
It is not exactly known how was the lake built, due to there not being any records of its construction, even though it is well established that it was man-made.

One source says that a dam was built in to the east of Badami between the bases of the hills forming a large tank to supply of water to the town.

According to religion, as mentioned earlier, it is said that the vedic sage Agastya created the lake.

Incredible India, a government funded tourism website, says that the lake was built as a strategic water deposit to source water to Badami.

=== Date of construction ===
It is widely debated when was the lake built. Many sources place the date in the 5th century, but others place it around the 6th or 7th century.

Incredible India, claims that the lake was built in the 7th century.

== Flood ==
In September 2022, after heavy rain, along with other rivers and lakes, Agasthya lake flooded, damaging the Badami cave temples.
