= Underground reservoirs in Žlutý kopec =

Water containers in Brno

Coordinates: 49°11′44.24″N 16°35′27.83″E

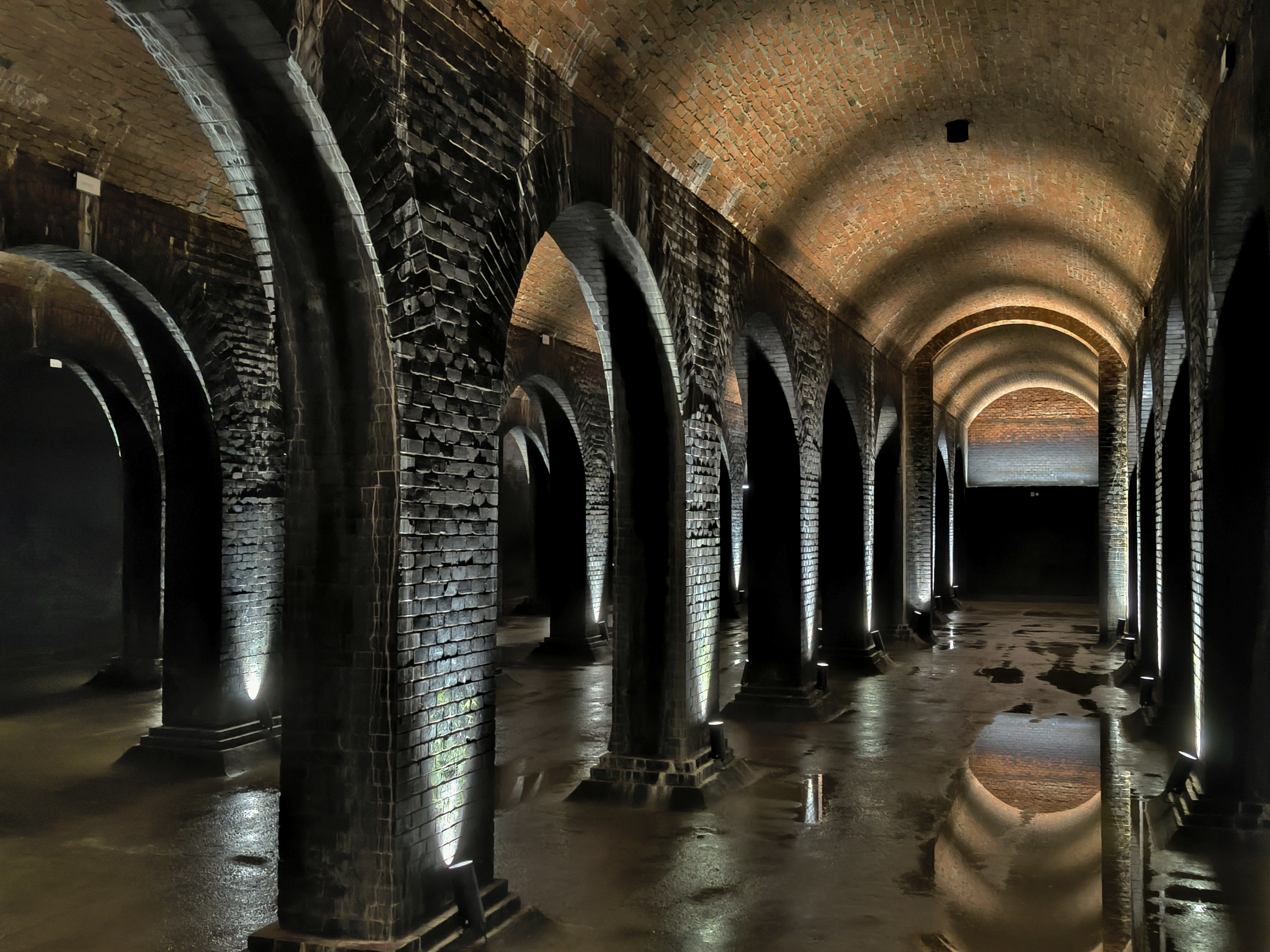
Second reservoir from 1894

The Underground reservoirs in Žlutý kopec are located between Tvrdého and Tomešova street on Žlutý kopec. The first of the historic reservoirs was built in 1872 to improve the quantity and quality of Brno's water supply. The reservoir was supplemented with another similar one at the end of the 19th century, and two decades later by a third reservoir consisting of two concrete tanks. The reservoirs remained in operation until 1997, when they were disconnected from the water supply network.

In autumn 2019, an entrance was built to allow access to the reservoirs, but has so far only been used for operational purposes. In the same year they were declared a cultural monument. In July 2020 the first underground reservoir was open to the public.

== Links ==
- Official website
