= Badami Shivalaya =

6th to 8th century Shiva temples with Dravida architecture in Badami

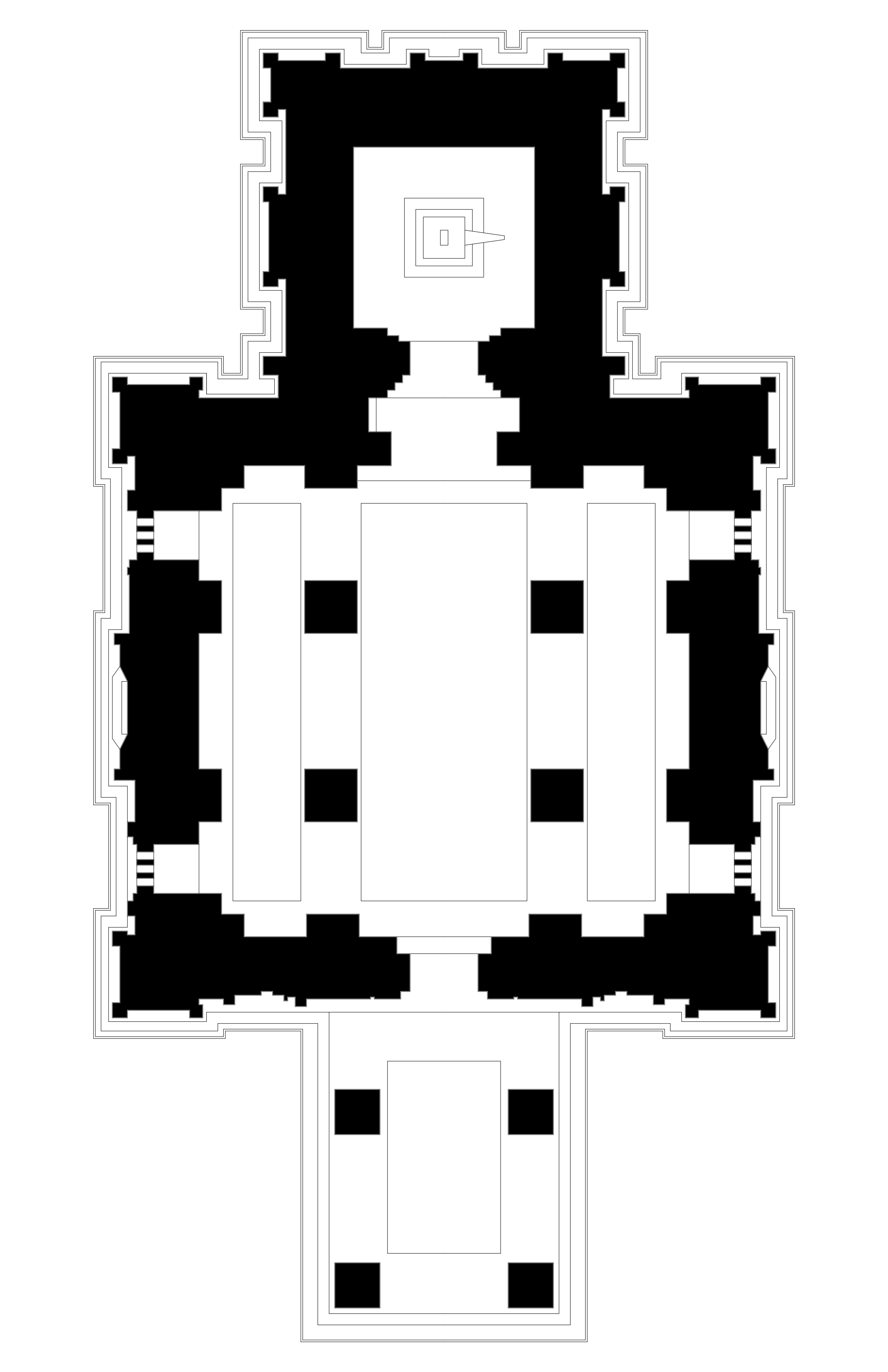
- Mallegitti Sivalaya temple floor plan, Badami Karnataka

- Location within India

Religion
- Affiliation: Hinduism
- Deity: Shiva
- Governing body: Archaeological Survey of India

Location
- Location: Badami, Karnataka
- Interactive map of Badami Shivalaya
- Coordinates: 15°55′25.3″N 75°40′53.1″E

Architecture
- Style: Dravida, Early Western Chalukya
- Established: 6th to 8th-century CE
- Temple: 3

Badami Shivalaya refers to one of three 6th to 8th-century CE Hindu temples in Badami, Bagalkot district of Karnataka, India. They illustrate the early Chalukya style, and are among the better preserved illustrations of Dravida Hindu architecture. They are close to the Badami cave temples and other structural temples near Agasthya lake, but the Badami Shivalyas are located near or on top of different hillocks. These include the Upper Shivalaya (actually a Vaishnava temple), Lower Shivalaya and the better preserved Mallegitti Sivalaya found to the north of the Badami town. These temples include Shiva, Vishnu and Devi-related artwork, as well as depict legends from the Ramayana and Mahabharata.

== Location and history ==
Badami is in north Karnataka in the Malprabha valley region – a cradle of Hindu and Jain temple architecture schools. Both Dravida and Nagara styles of temples are found in this region, particularly at the major temple sites of Badami, Aihole, Pattadakal and Mahakuta. These were built by the Badami Chalukyas, also called the Eastern Chalukyas, between the 6th and 8th century. They are key to understanding the development of temple architecture and arts, as well as the Karnata tradition of arts around the mid 1st-millennium CE. These sites also contain many increasingly sophisticated temples and arts from the Rashtrakutas and Later Chalukyas, completed through the early 13th century. Thereafter, states George Michell, this region was ravaged and temples ruined by conquering armies of the Delhi Sultanate. The Malprabha region was hotly contested by the Hindu kings of the Vijayanagara Empire and the Islamic Sultans of Deccan region. The Vijayanagara kings extended the fort walls in Badami and elsewhere. The Badami Shivalayas are found in this tapestry of architecture and history.

The north fort of Badami overlooks the lake, and is penetrated by deep canyon-like crevices through which climbs a straight path. The first features to be seen along this path are two freestanding, multi-storeyed mandapas, seemingly unconnected with any temples. They are possibly ruins of lost temples. Lower Shivalaya stands on a rocky terrace. At the summit of north fort is the upper Shivalaya. Both these were probably erected in the early 7th century.

The ruinous condition of this monument contrast with the comparatively intact Malegitti Shivalaya, which crowns on an isolated boulder beneath the western flank of the North fort. This temple is also dated to the first half of the 7th century and is of historical interest for its well-preserved cravings.

== Malegitti Shivalaya ==
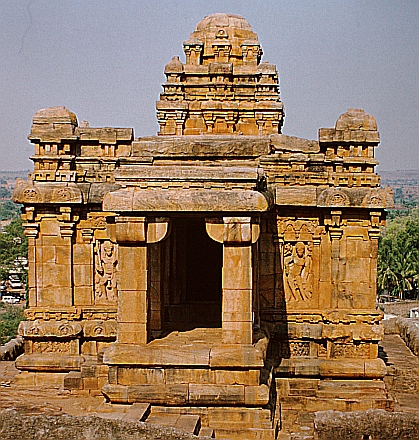
Malegitti Shivalaya, an excellent example of early Dravida architecture.

The Malegitti temple (c. 625–675 CE) is on the top of a huge boulder to the north of the Badami town. It is the earliest surviving and best-preserved example of the Dravida style in Early Chalukya architecture in Badami. It consists of a sanctum that opens into a gudha-mandapa supported by four pillars. the walls of the sanctuary and the mandapa have a curved course and a central recessed portion, divided into panels, with reliefs of musicians, dancers and warriors. Though a small Shiva temple, it includes both Shaivism and Vaishnavism artwork with equal prominence.

The mandapa walls have three projections on the north and south, among which the middle one accommodates panels portraying Shiva (south) and Vishnu (north). Each god is accompanied by a pair of attendants. The mandapa walls, beside the porch, have a corner pilastered projection and a single niche containing a dvarapala. The mandapa walls have a jali window (perforated stone window to let light in). The base of the temple sits on a northern style kapotabandha, not a Dravida style jagati. Above this level, the temple is Dravida architecture set with a square floor plan.

The sanctum and the mandapa walls are overhung by continuous kapota eaves on a frieze of ganas. Two recessed moldings support a parapet, with a set of corner kutas and central shalas over the mandapa walls. A shikara superstructure rises above the sanctum, featuring two talas (storeys). These talas and architecture of the vimana is Dravida in contrast to the temples near the lake that include the Nagara architecture. The vimana is divided into bhadra and karnas with recesses between them. The stupi (kalasa) has been lost to history.

The mandapa interior has a central east-west aisle, defined by raised floor strips linking the free-standing and engaged columns. Two additional columns define a small bay in front of the sanctuary doorway. Transverse beams carried on open-mouthed makara brackets carry the raised and horizontal roof slabs, with Vishnu on flying Garuda carved onto the central bay. The sanctuary doorway is framed by jambs, including those with serpent bodies culminating in a flying Garuda over the lintel, with male and female figures beneath at either side. A linga on a pedestal, perhaps replacing a sculpted icon, is seen within the sanctum, according to George Michell. Other intricately carved artwork include those of Brahma, Surya, Ganesha, Durga, Trivikrama, Narasimha, Kartikeya, Ganga, Bhuvaraha, Umasahita, Vinadhara and Tandavesvara Shiva.

== Lower Shivalaya ==
Only the towered sanctuary of the temple does exist today; its outer walls have been dismantled. The sanctuary was originally surrounded by a passageway on three sides, possibly with a mandapa extension to the east which can be predicted by observing the broken roof slabs set into its walls and the stumps of beans with friezes of ganas. The temple's doorway is framed by bands of lotus ornament. An unusual, elliptical pedestal is seen within which happens to be empty now. The outer walls have flat pilasters but there are no signs of projections or sculptures niche. It is framed by corner model elements topped by kuta roofs containing miniature nidhis.

== Upper Shivalaya ==
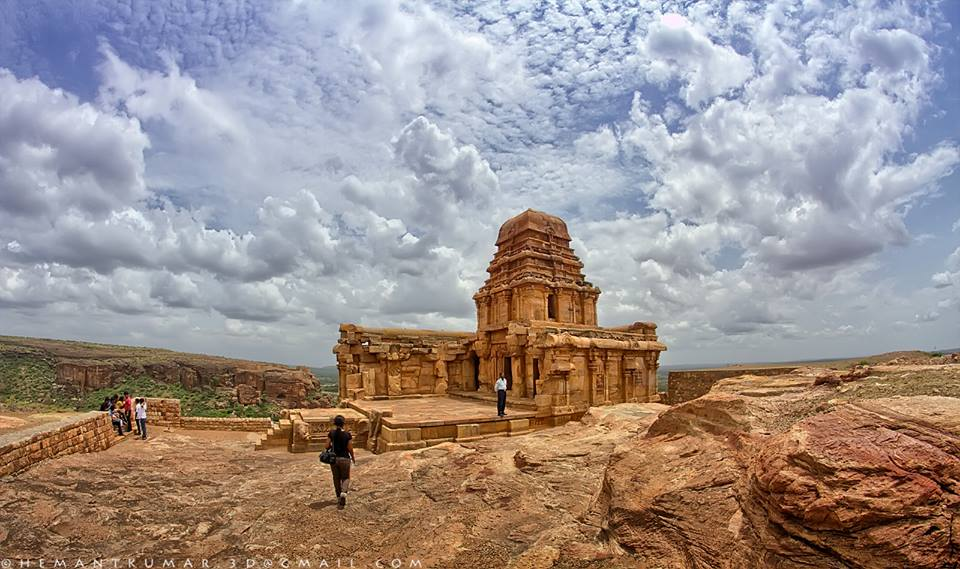
Upper Shivalaya

This temple (c. 600–625 CE) is found on the highest section of the northern hill, it is northeast of the Lower Shivalaya. Though called "Upper Shivalaya", it is actually a Vaishnava temple.

The outer walls of the temple create a rectangle containing a square sanctum and a symmetric pradakshinapatha inside. The sanctum opens into a columned mandapa on the east. This is a ruined temple in parts, as it is missing its internal columns. The walls are built on a basement with a central recessed course containing foliate ornament and narrative scenes. On the south face, Ramayana episodes are pictured, which Meister and Dhaky call as "elegant narratives in discrete and expressive figures". These include the waking of Kumbhakarna, scenes from various Rama legends. Panels on the west face depict the birth and childhood of Lord Krishna, including Krishna sucking Putana’s breasts. Though there are no narratives seen on the north.

The walls above have narrow projections by pilasters carried up into the parapet, four on the south and three on the west. The central pilastered projections have panels depicting Krishna lifting Mount Govardhana (south), Narasimha disemboweling his victim (north), etc. These support miniature eaves and kudus, the latter intruding in the kapota eaves. The square tower over the sanctuary has pilastered walls. It is crowned by a large kuta, without finial, the earliest and best preserved example of this type of Dravida styled roof in Early Chalukya architecture.
