= Fakirbhudihal =

Coordinates: 15.8722°N 75.7200°E

- village
- Location in Karnataka, India Fakirbhudihal (India)
- Country: India
- State: Karnataka
- District: Bagalkot District

Government
  - Type: Panchayati raj (India)
  - Body: Gram panchayat

Languages
  - Official: Kannada
- Time zone: UTC+5:30 (IST)

Fakirbhudihal is a village in Bagalkot district (Badami Taluka) Karnataka state of India. It is near Badami.

== See also ==
- Pattadakal
- Mahakuta
- Aihole
- Gajendragad
- Sudi
- North Karnataka
