= Haldur =

- village
- Country: India
- State: Karnataka
- District: Bagalkot District

Government
  - Type: Panchayati raj (India)
  - Body: Gram panchayat

Languages
  - Official: Kannada
- Time zone: UTC+5:30 (IST)

Haldur is a village in Badami taluka, Bagalkot district, Karnataka state, India.

== See also ==
- Pattadakal
- Mahakuta
- Aihole
- Gajendragad
- Sudi
- North Karnataka
