= Badami =

Town in Karnataka, India

Badami Vatapi
- Town
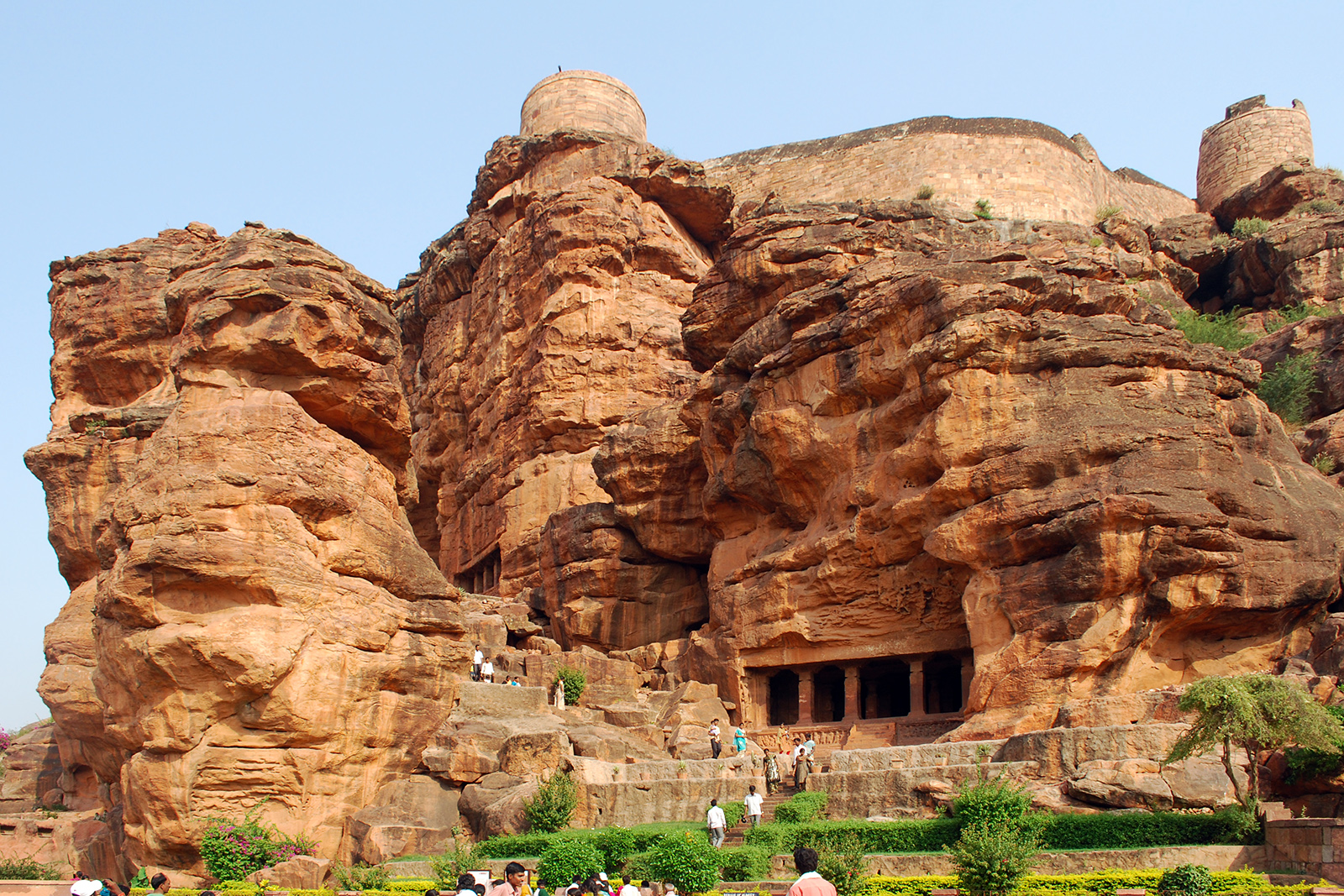
- Badami Cave Temples

- Location within Karnataka Location within India
- Coordinates: 15°55′12″N 75°40′49″E
- Country: India
- State: Karnataka
- District: Bagalkot

Area
  - Total: 10.9 km^{2} (4.2 sq mi)
- Elevation: 586 m (1,923 ft)

Population (2011)
  - Total: 30,943
  - Density: 2,840/km^{2} (7,350/sq mi)

Languages
  - Official: Kannada
- Time zone: UTC+5:30 (IST)
- PIN: 587 201
- Telephone code: 08357
- Website: http://www.badamitown.mrc.gov.in/

Bādāmi (Kannada: [baːd̪aːmi]), formerly known as Vātāpi (Sanskrit: from āpi, ‘friend, ally’; ‘having the wind (vāta) as an ally’), is a town and headquarters of a taluk by the same name, in the Bagalkot district of Karnataka, India. It was the regal capital of the Badami Chalukyas from 540 to 757. It is famous for its rock cut monuments such as the Badami cave temples, as well as the structural temples such as the Bhutanatha temples, Badami Shivalaya and Jambulingesvara Temple. It is located in a ravine at the foot of a rugged, red sandstone outcrop that surrounds Agastya lake.

Badami has been selected as one of the heritage cities for HRIDAY - Heritage City Development and Augmentation Yojana scheme of Government of India.

== History ==
=== History ===
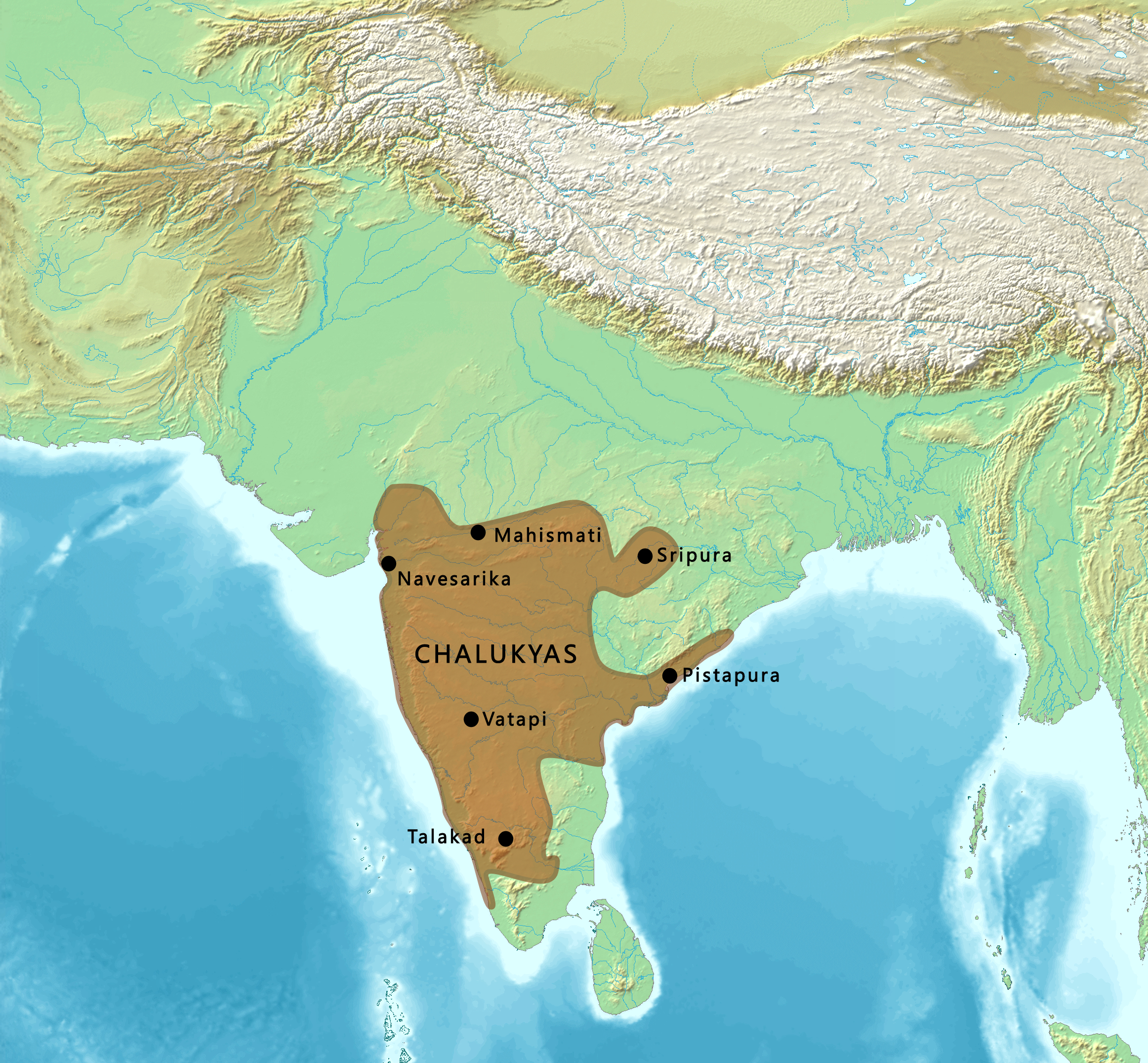
Extent of Badami Chalukyas Empire, 636 CE, 740 CE

Pulakeshin I an early ruler of the Chalukyas, is generally regarded as having founded the Badami Chalukya dynasty in 540. An inscription record of this king engraved on a boulder in Badami records the fortification of the hill above 'Vatapi' in 544. Pulakeshin's choice of this location for his capital was likely due to strategic considerations, as Badami is protected on three sides by rugged sandstone cliffs. His son Kirtivarman I and his brother Mangalesha constructed the cave temples located there. The Agastya lake (formerly Vatapi lake) is a man-made lake, a water infrastructure project completed in the 7th century, likely as a strategic source of water for the capital and around which many Hindu temples were constructed.

Kirtivarman I strengthened Vatapi and had three sons, Pulakeshin II, Vishnuvardhana and Buddhavarasa, who were minors at the time of his death. Kirtivarman I's brother Mangalesha ruled the kingdom, as is mentioned in the Mahakuta Pillar inscription. In 610, the famous Pulakeshin II came to power and ruled between up to 642. Vatapi was the capital of the Early Chalukyas, who ruled much of Karnataka, Maharashtra, parts of Tamil Nadu and Andhra Pradesh between the 6th and 8th centuries.

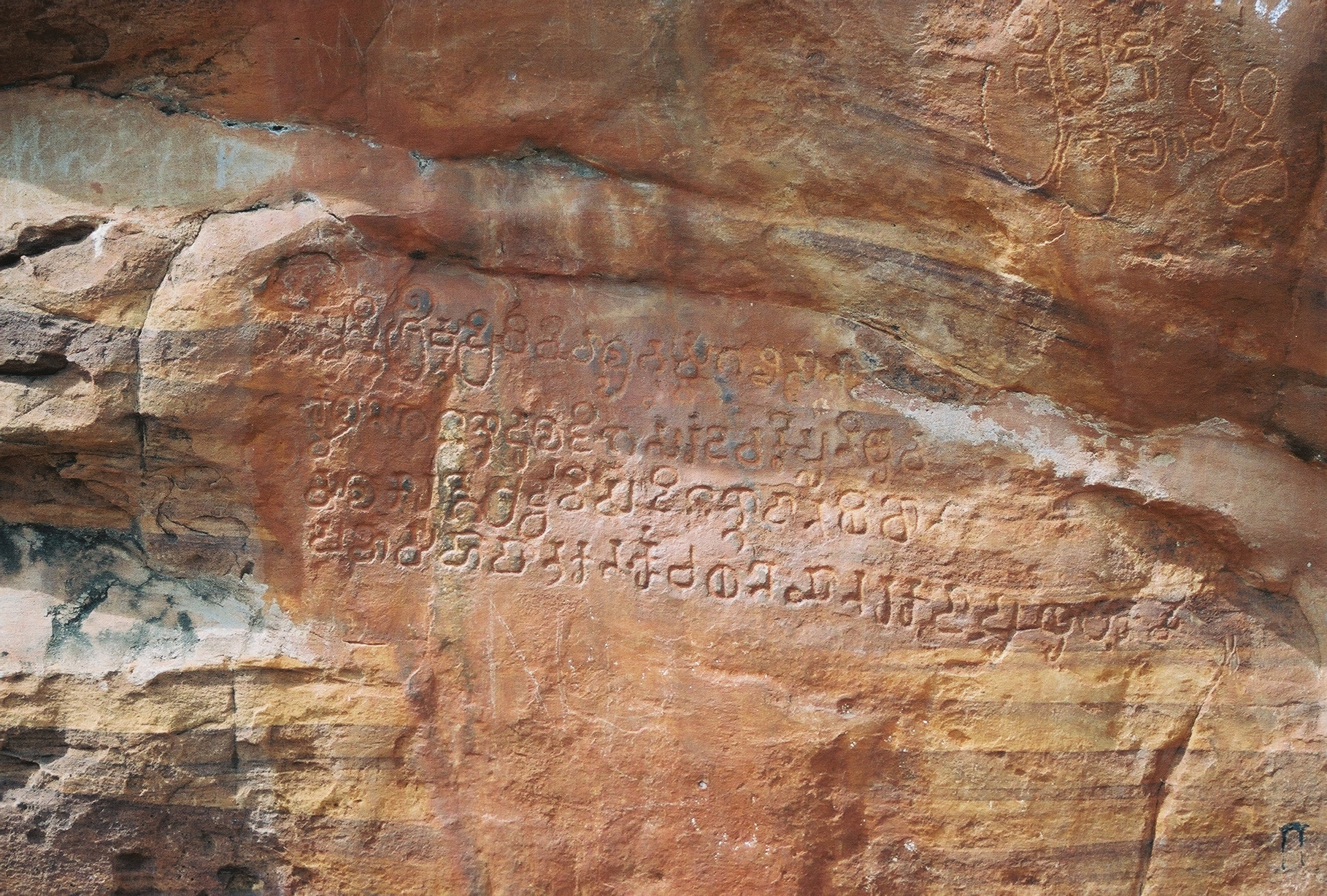
Old Kannada inscription of Chalukya King Mangalesha dated 578 CE at Badami cave temple no.3

Under the Badami Chalukyas, Badami emerged as one of the regional centres of art in the Malprabha valley – a cradle of Hindu and Jain temple architecture schools. Both Dravida and Nagara styles of temples are found in Badami, along with those in Aihole, Pattadakal and Mahakuta. Many of the temples in Badami, such as the Eastern Bhutanatha group and the Jambulingesvara temple, were built between the 6th and 8th century. They are key to understanding the development of temple architecture and arts, as well as the Karnata tradition of arts around the mid 1st-millennium CE.

When Pulakeshin II was defeated by Narasimhavarman of Pallavas in 642CE, the Pallava army descended upon the city of Vatapi, indulging in the riches accumulated over generations by the Chalukyas. The royal palace was ransacked, men were slain, women taken captive, and temples stripped of their treasures. A later oral tradition claims that among the spoils was the revered ‘Vatapi Ganapati’ idol, now celebrated in Carnatic music. This idol was allegedly transported to the Uthrapathiswaraswamy temple near present-day Nagapattinam in Pallava territory. As the city burned, its survivors—immigrant preachers, architects, traders, officials, and laborers—gathered whatever they could and fled, not to return for many years. Narasimhavarman Mahamalla seized the victory pillar that Pulakeshin II had once erected in the city after he had defeated Harsha and Vengi, and brought it to Kanchi. A Pallava inscription, written in their script and still found in Badami, proclaims the attack as a fierce retaliation for Pulakeshin's past conquests.

These sites also contain many increasingly sophisticated temples and arts from the Rashtrakutas and Later Chalukyas, such as the Northern Bhutanatha group of temples and the Yellamma Temple, completed through the early 13th century. Thereafter, states George Michell, this region was ravaged and temples ruined by invading armies of the Turko-Persian Delhi Sultanate.

Badami and other sites in the Malprabha region were fought over by the Hindu monarchs of the Vijayanagara Empire and the Turko-Persian Sultans of Deccan. The Vijayanagara emperors commissioned expanded fort walls in Badami and elsewhere. Many ruins, the fort and some well preserved temples in high hillocks survive and attest to the rich heritage of Badami and nearby sites from these centuries. The Turko-Persian sultanate rule that followed the Vijayanagara period forcefully and aggressively islamized the site. This is attested by two monuments here. One is the Markaj Jumma near the entrance of the cave temples and structural temples. It has the 18th-century tomb of Abdul Malik Aziz. The other Islamic monument is also of modern era – the dargah of Sayyid Hazrat Badshah near the Upper Shivalaya.

=== Inscriptions ===
Badami has eighteen inscriptions, with important historical information. The first Sanskrit inscription in old Kannada script, on a hillock dates back to 543 CE, from the period of Pulakeshin I (Vallabheswara), the second is the 578 CE cave inscription of Mangalesha in Kannada language and script and the third is the Kappe Arabhatta records, the earliest available Kannada poetry in tripadi (three line) metre. one inscription near the Bhuthanatha temple also has inscriptions dating back to the 12th century in Jain rock-cut temple dedicated to the Tirtankara Adinatha.

=== Paintings ===
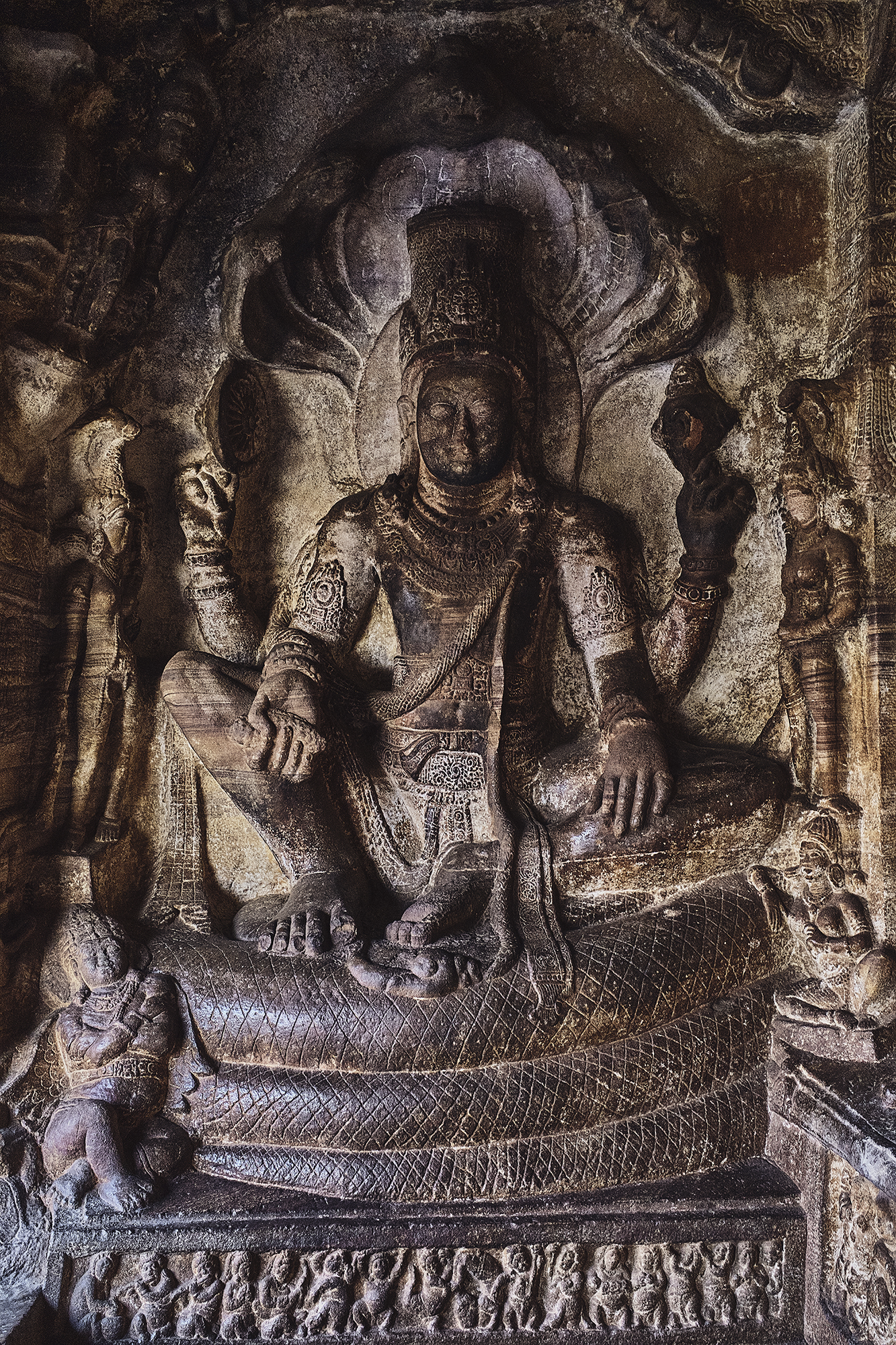

The Badami cave temples were likely fully painted inside by the late 6th century. Most of these paintings are now lost, except for the mural fragments, bands and faded sections found in Cave 3 (Vaishnava, Hindu) and Cave 4 (Jain). The original murals are most clearly evidenced in Cave 3, where inside the Vishnu temple, there are paintings of secular art as well as murals that depict legends of Shiva and Parvati on the ceiling and in parts less exposed to the natural elements. These are among the earliest known paintings of Hindu legends in India that can be dated.

== In literature ==
Badami is predominantly featured in the Tamil language historical fiction novel series Sivagamiyin Sapatham, written by Kalki Krishnamurthy. Hindi Film Guru featuring Abisek Bachan was shot in Badami. A part of the Tamil film Taj Mahal was shot in Badami, with a part of the song 'Adi Manja Kilange' shot at Agastya Teertha.

== Gallery ==
Historic sites in Badami, Karnataka
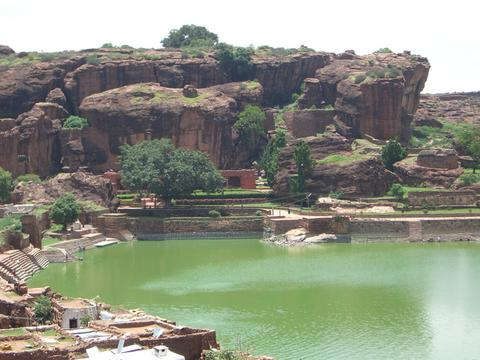
Agastya lake

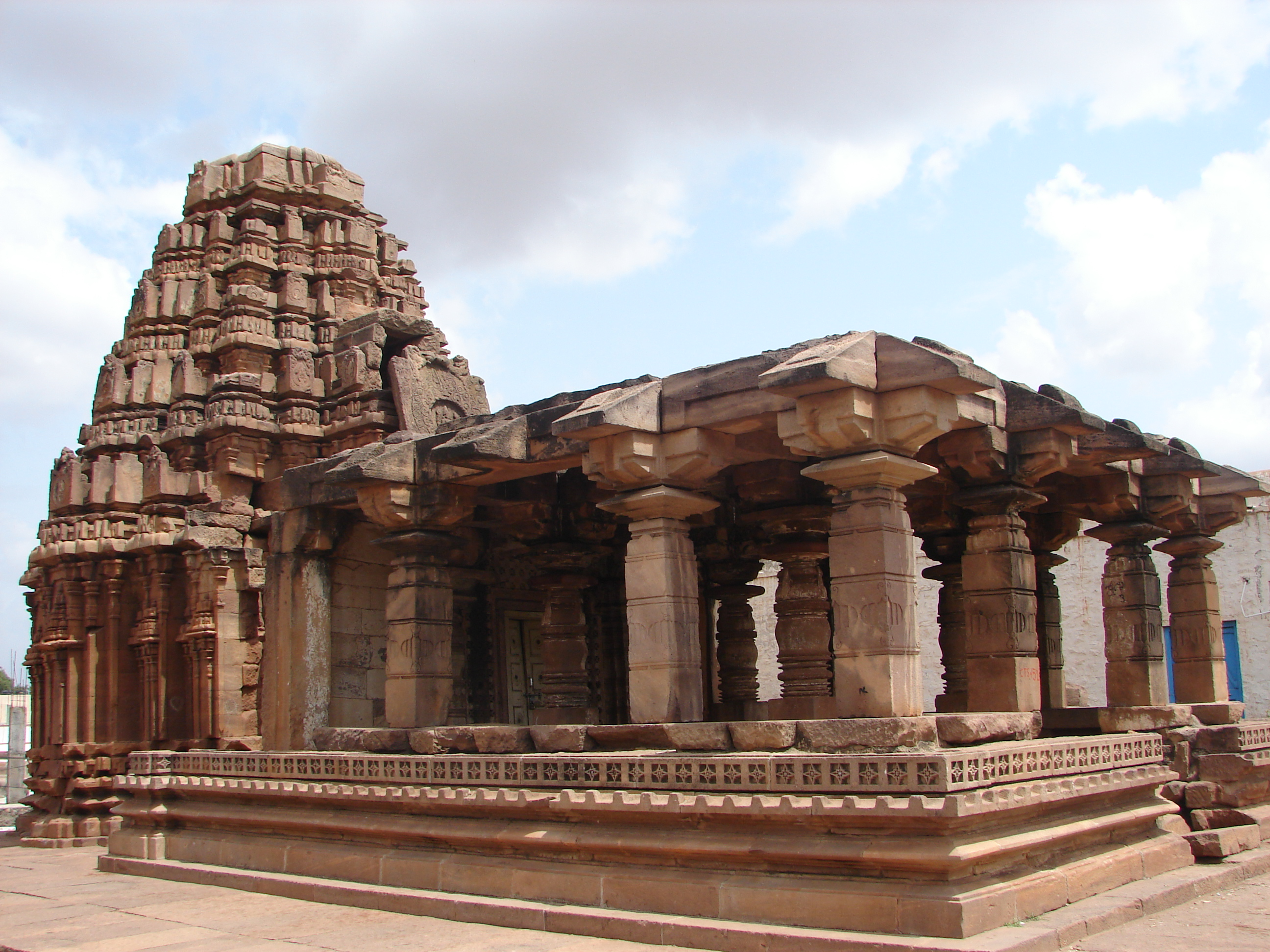
Yellamma temple at Badami, early phase construction, 11th century

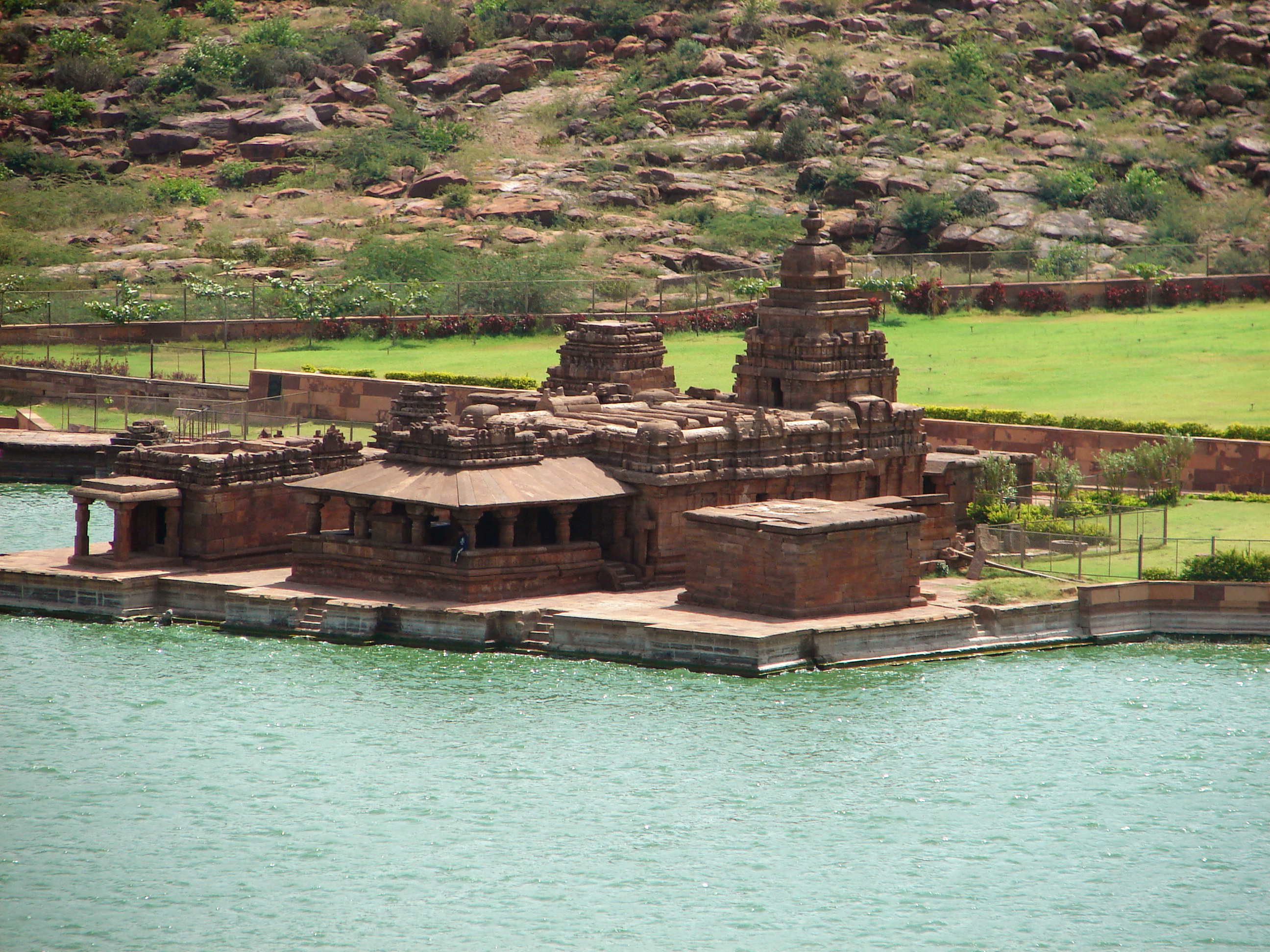
Bhutanatha group of temples facing the Agasythya Tank

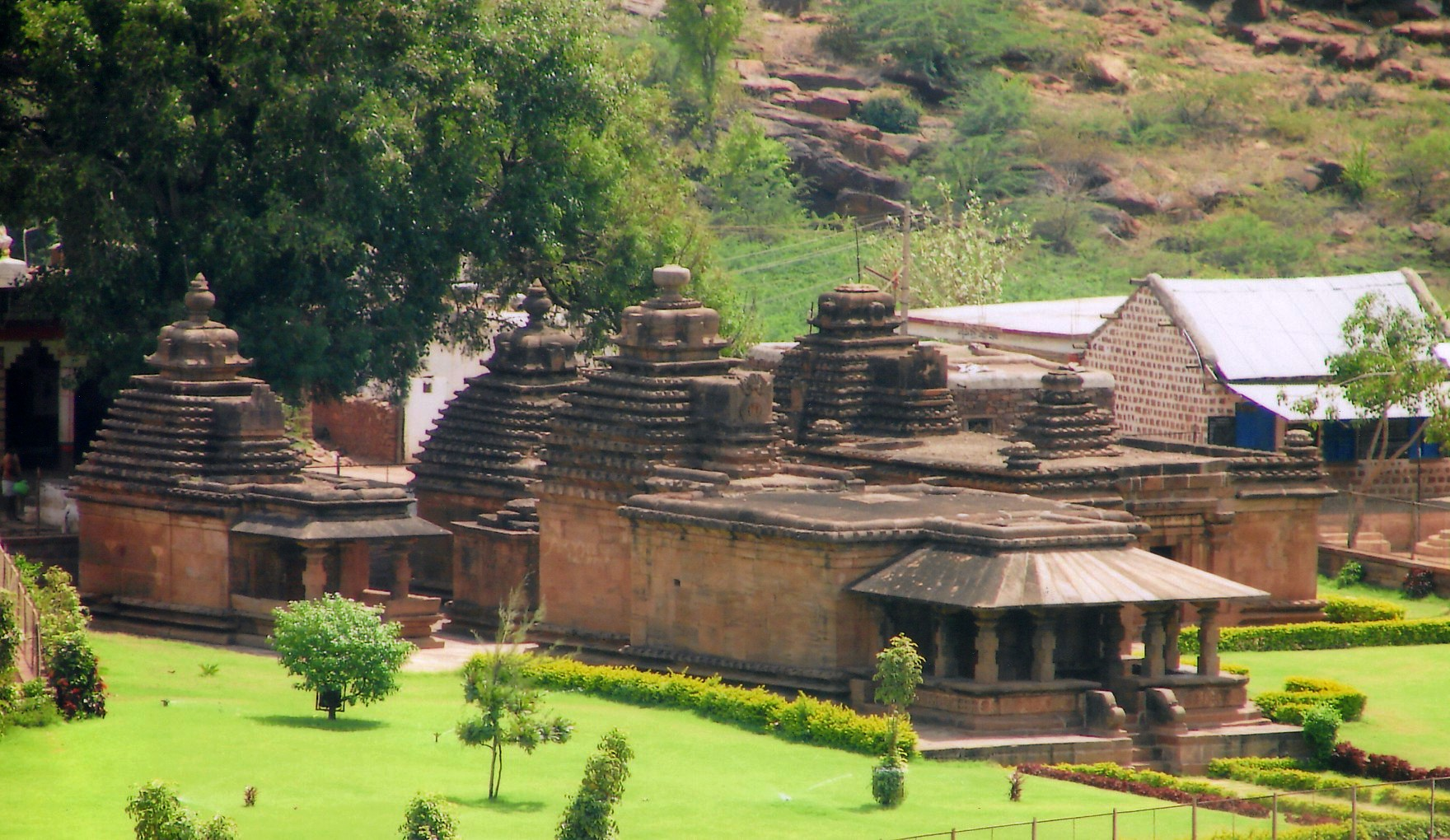
Mallikarjuna group of temples

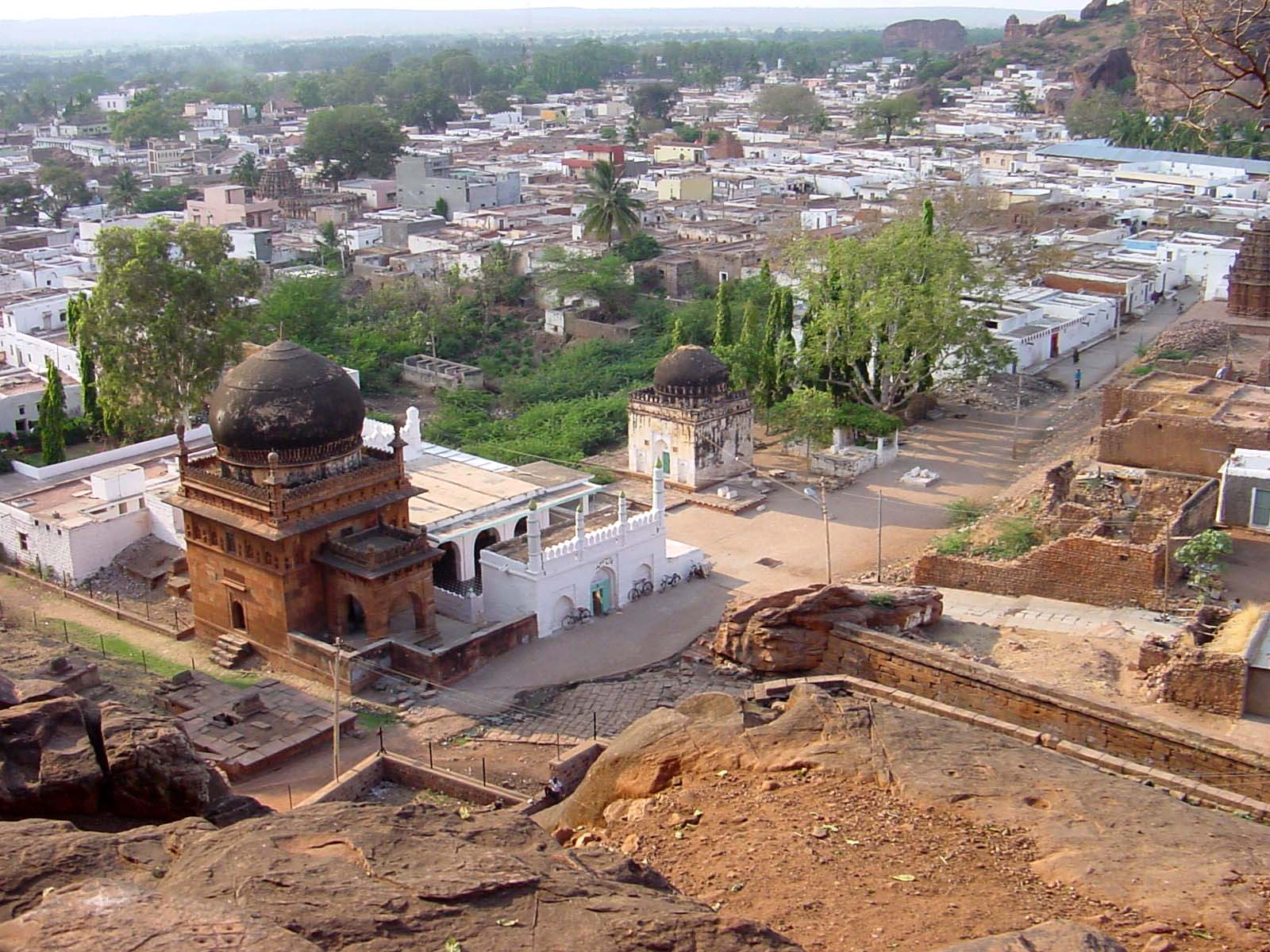
Markaj Jumma in Badami

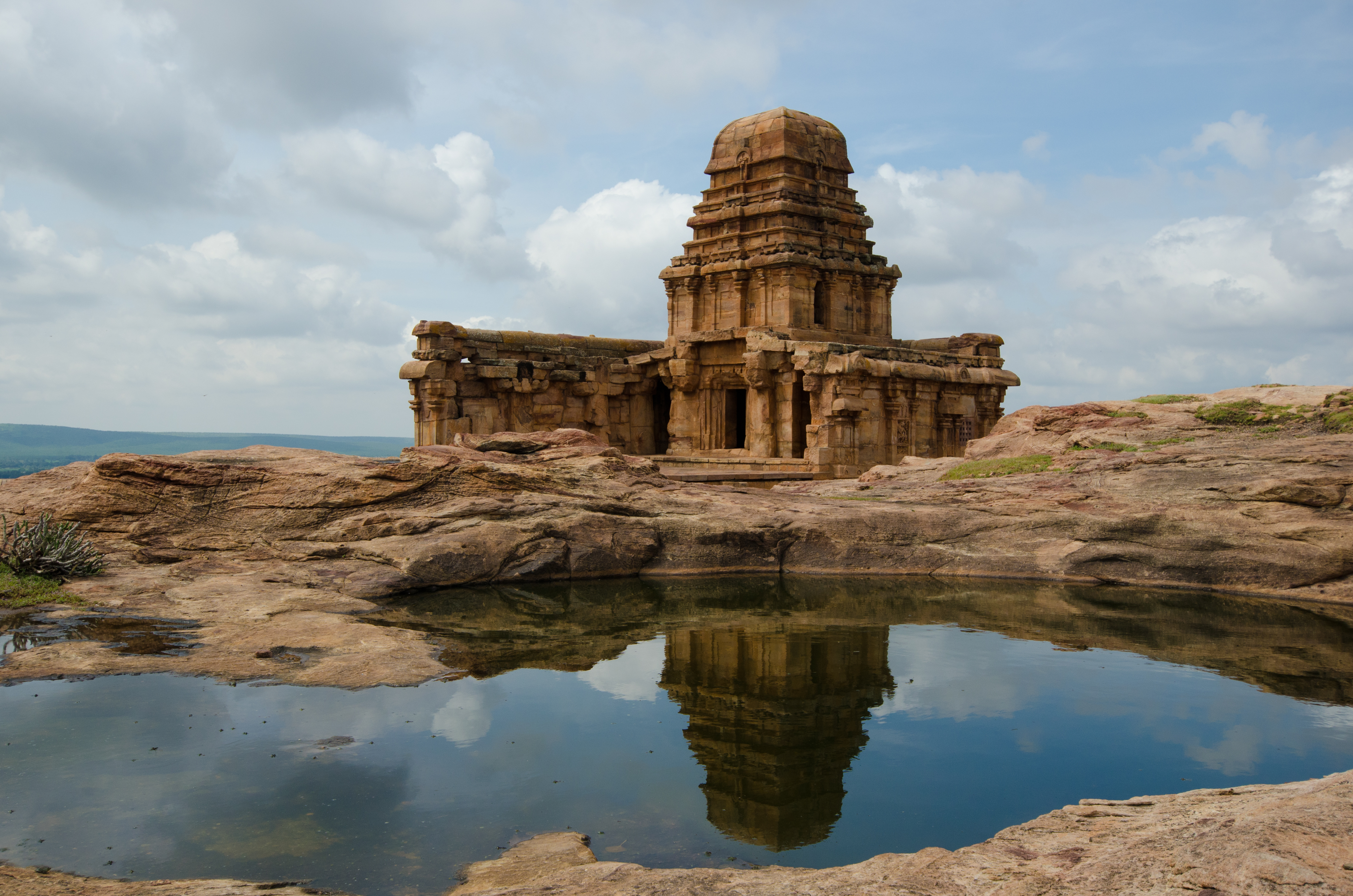
Northern Fort Temple

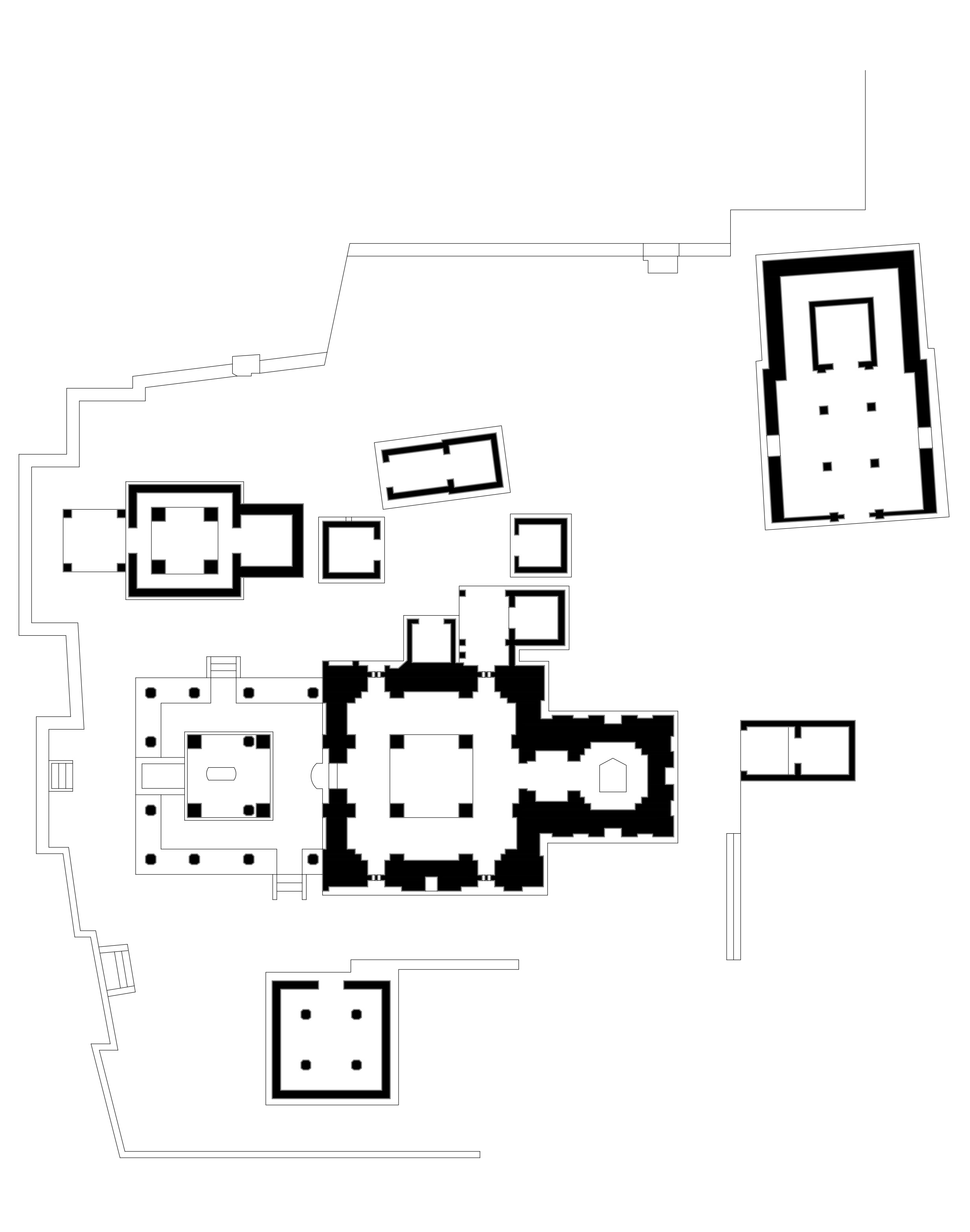
Floor plans of the 8th-century Bhutanatha temple near the lake

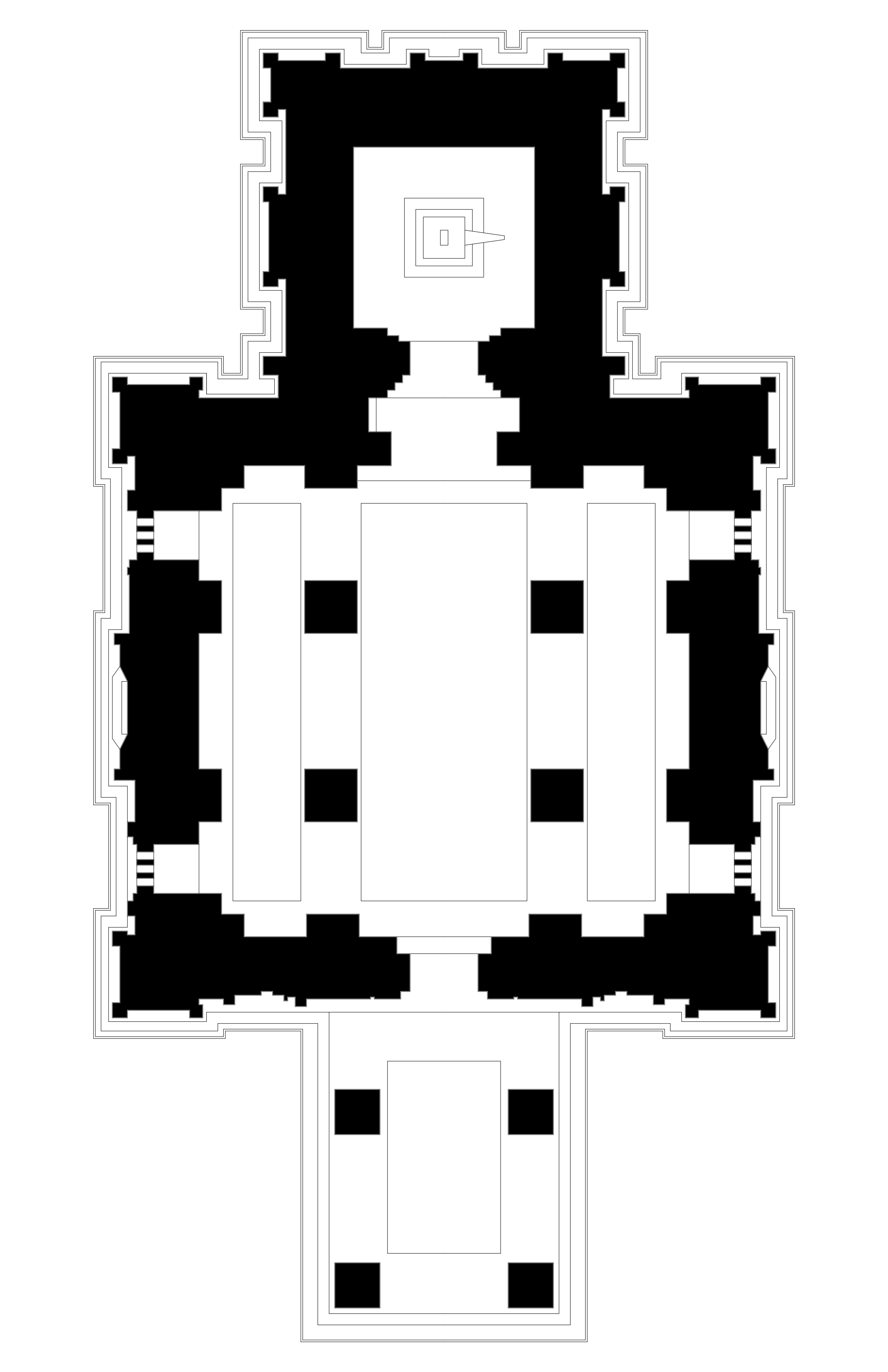
Mallegitti Shivalaya on the top of a rock, best preserved Dravida architecture in Badami

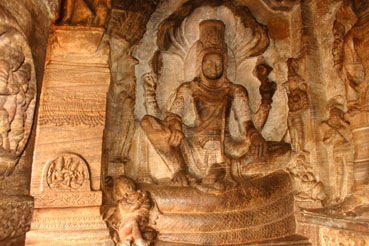
Vishnu seated on Adishesha

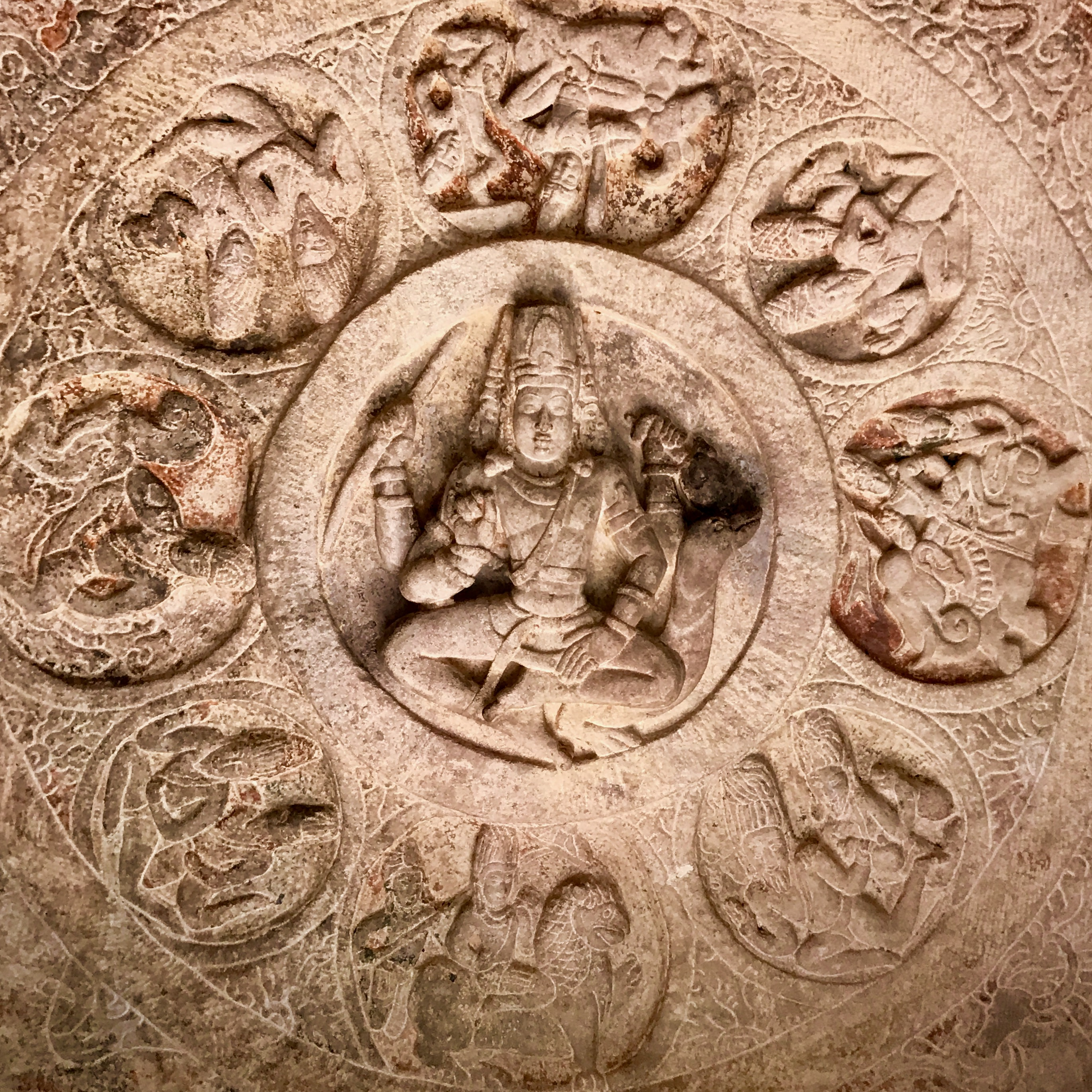
Brahma on Hamsa in Cave 3 ceiling

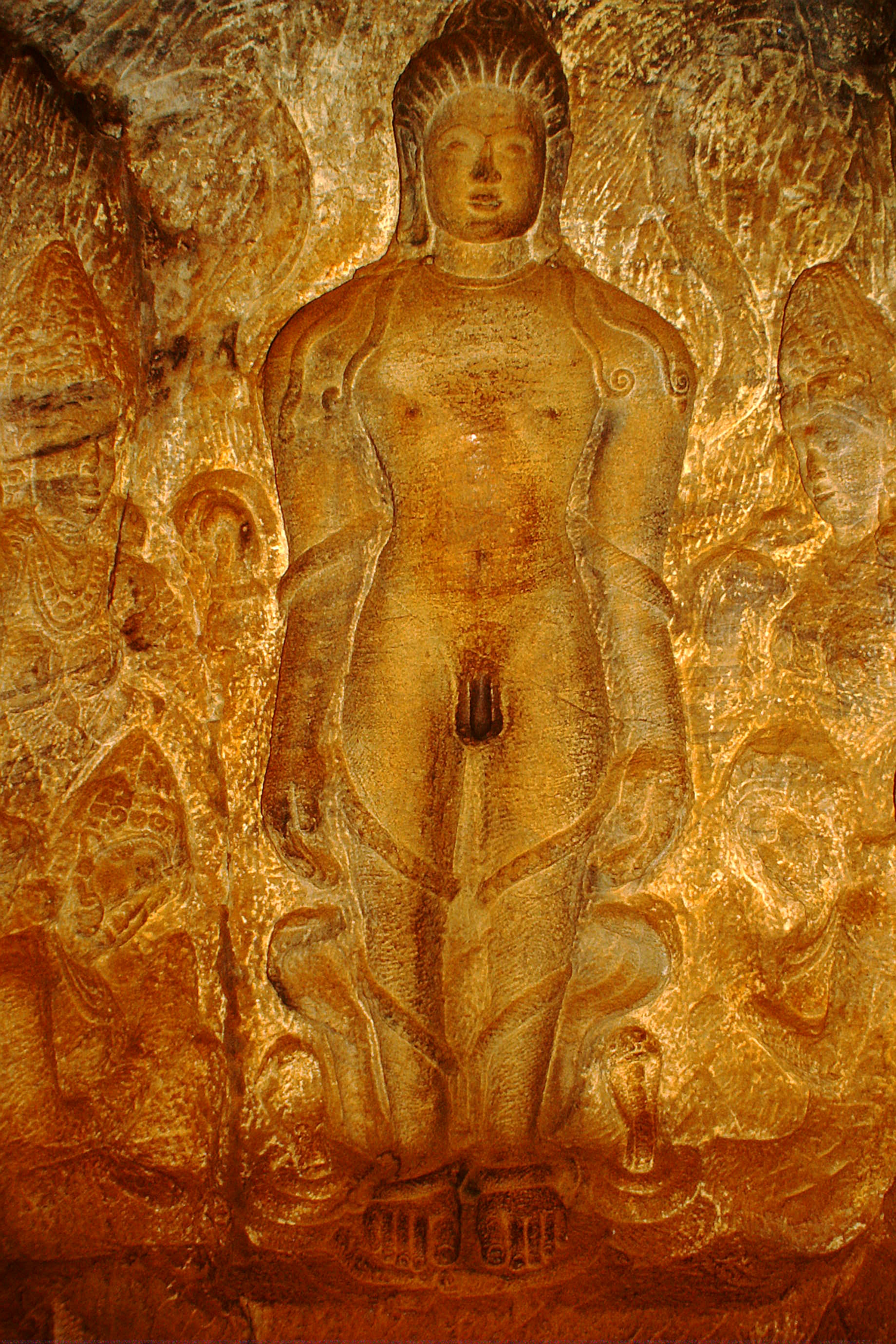
Bahubali in cave 4

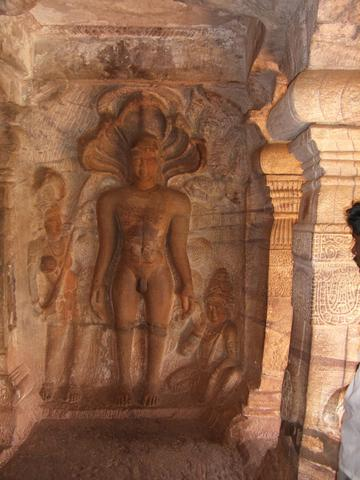
Jain Parshvanatha in cave 4

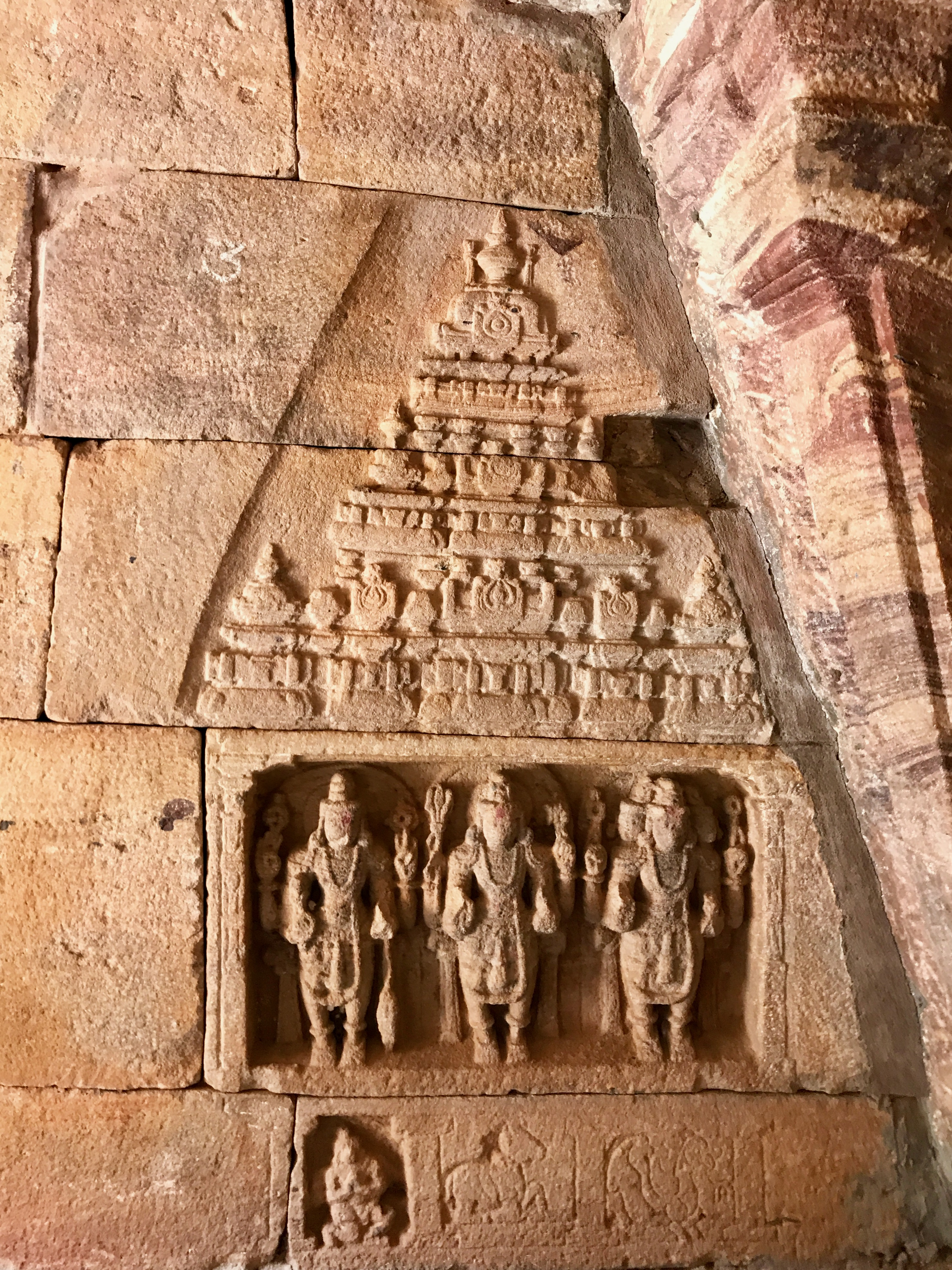
Vishnu, Shiva and Brahma in a small rock carving monument

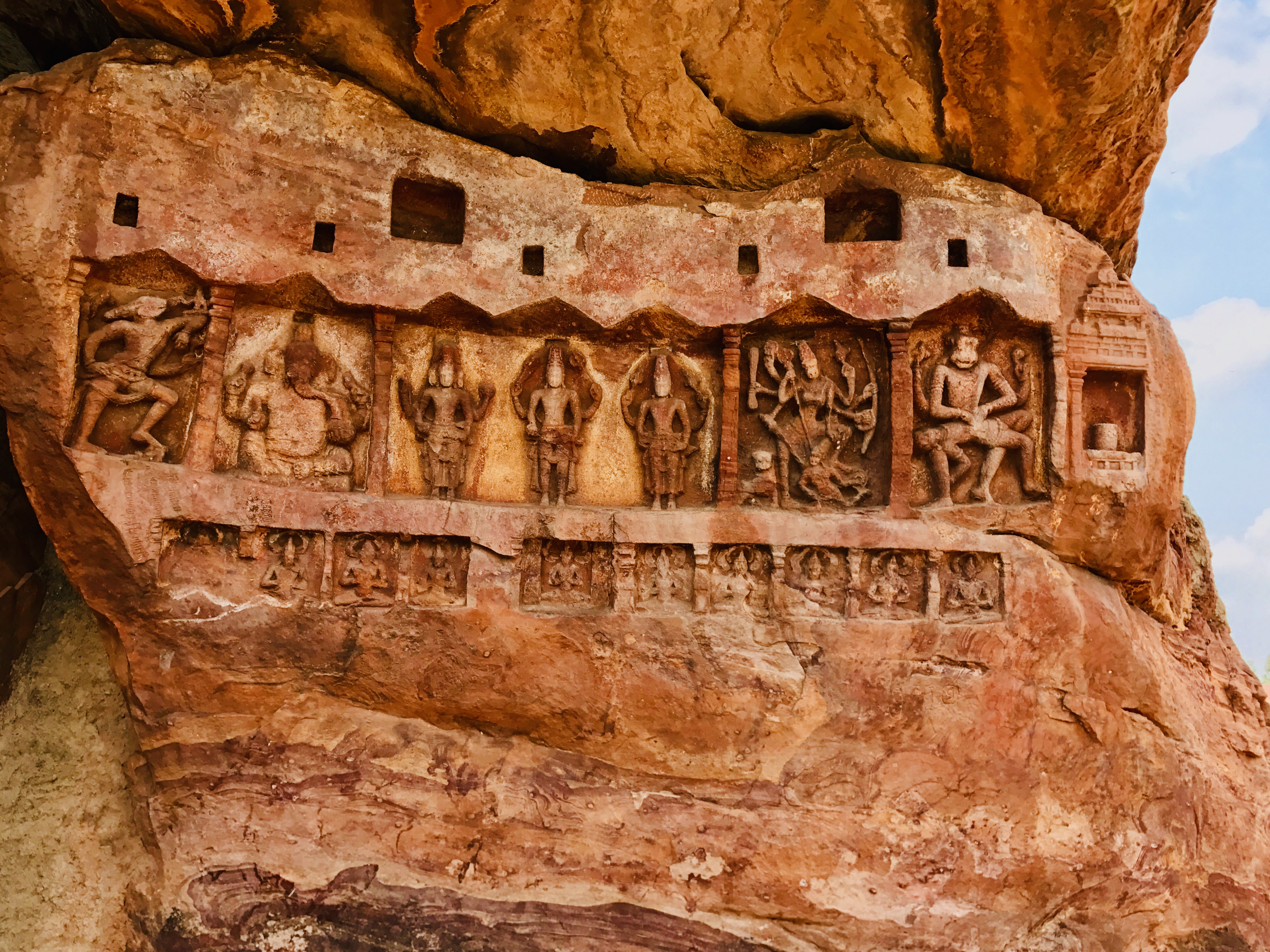
Hindu reliefs on a Badami boulder

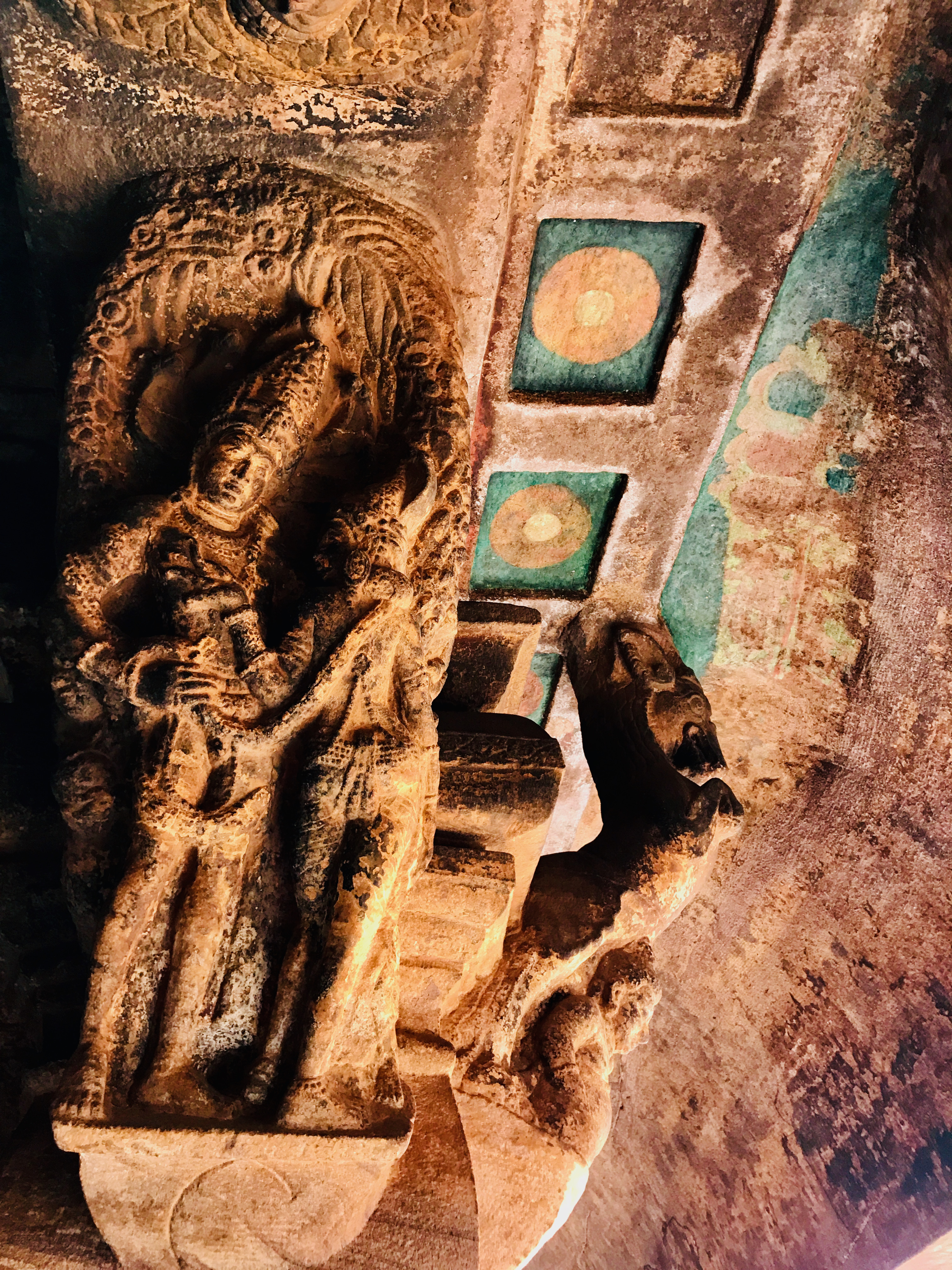
Some Badami cave monuments show evidence of paintings

== Administration ==
=== Taluks ===
The Badami Taluka has thirty-four panchayat villages:

- Adagal
- Anawal
- Belur
- Cholachagudda
- Fakirbhudihal
- Haldur
- Halkurki
- Hansanur
- Hebbali
- Hosur
- Huligeri
- Hullikeri
- Jalihal
- Jamankatti
- Kaknur
- Katageri
- Kataraki
- Kelavadi
- Khanapur S.K.
- Kittali
- Kotikal
- Layadgundi
- Mamtageri
- Mangalore
- Mustigeri
- Mutalgeri
- Nagaral S.P.
- Nandikeshwar
- Neelgund
- Neeralkeri
- Neerbhudihal
- Parvati
- Pattadkal
- Sulikeri

== Geography ==
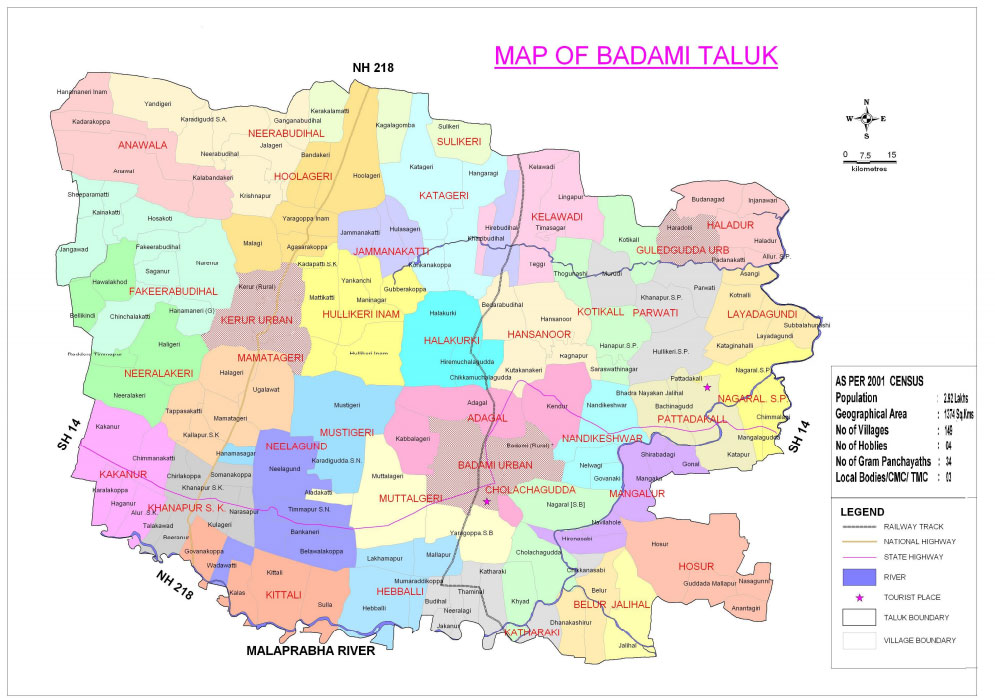
Badami Taluk Map before creation of Guledgud Taluk

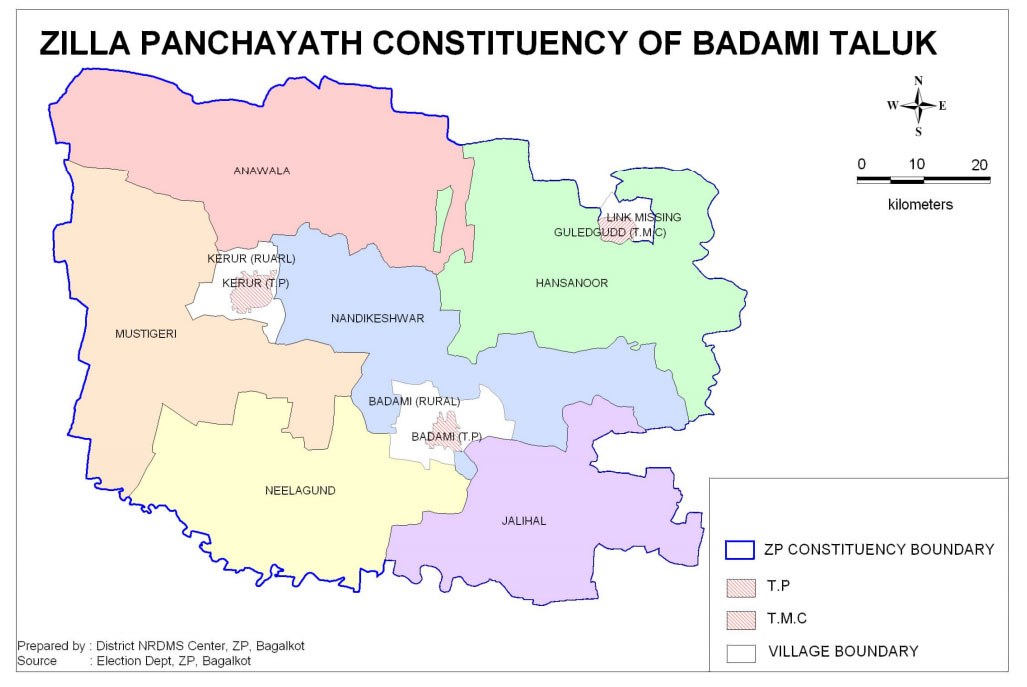
Badami Taluk ZP Constituency Map before creation of Guledgud Taluk

Badami has an average elevation of 586 metres (1922 ft). It is located at the mouth of a ravine between two rocky hills and surrounds Agastya tirtha water reservoir on the three other sides. The total area of the town is 10.3 square kilometers.

It is located 30 kilometers from Bagalkot, 128 kilometers from Bijapur, 132 kilometers from Hubli, 46 kilometers from Aihole, another ancient town, and 589 kilometers from Bangalore, the state capital.

=== Climate ===
- Summer – March to June
- Monsoons – July to October that contributes to rainfall
- Winter – November to February

The temperature ranges from a minimum 22 degrees to a maximum 40 degrees in summer and from 14 to 29 degrees in winter. The average rainfall is around 68 cm (680 mm). The climate of Badami has made it a safe haven for the monkeys of southern India. Tourists often flock to Badami for the opportunity to see monkeys interact in a natural environment.

== Demographics ==
As of the 2011 Indian Census, Badami had a total population of 30,943, of which 15,539 were males and 15,404 were females. The population within the age group of 0 to 6 years was 3,877. The total number of literates in Badami was 22,093, which constituted 71.4% of the population with male literacy of 78.1% and female literacy of 64.7%. The effective literacy rate of 7+ population of Badami was 81.6%, of which male literacy rate was 89.7% and female literacy rate was 73.6%. The Scheduled Castes and Scheduled Tribes population was 4,562 and 1,833 respectively. Badami had 6214 households in 2011.

As of the 2001 Indian census, Badami had a population of 25,851. Males constituted 51% of the population and females 49%. Badami had an average literacy rate of 64.8%, comparable to the national average of 65%; with 59% of the males and 41% of females literate. 14% of the population was under 6 years of age.

The main language spoken is Kannada.

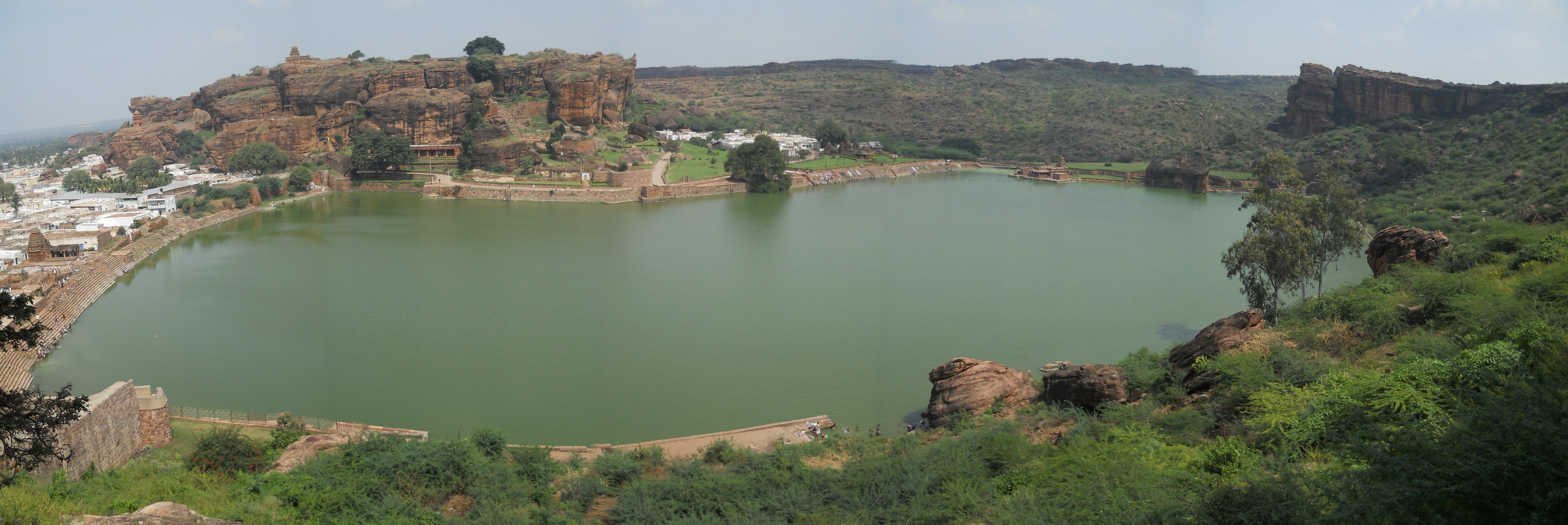
Panoramic view of Agastya Teertha, Badami.

== Climbing ==
Badami's red sandstone cliffs are popular amongst local and international climbers. This is popular location for free sport climbing and bouldering. The cliffs have a horizontal crack systems, similar to Gunks. There are over 150 bolted routes and multiple routes for free climbing. Gerhard Schaar, a German Climber and Pranesh Manchaiah, a local climber from Bangalore, were instrumental in setting up the sport routes by driving a project called 'Bolts for Bangalore'.

== See also ==
- Aihole
- Badami Cave Temples
- Badami Chalukya Architecture
- Banashankari Amma Temple at Cholachagudd
- Chalukya
- Climbing locations in India
- Gadag
- Indian rock-cut architecture
- List of State Protected Monuments in Karnataka
- Lakkundi
- Mahakuta
- Sidlaphadi
- North Karnataka
- Pattadakal
- Pulakeshin II
- Siege of Badami
- Sivagamiyin sabadham
- Sudi
- Tourism in Karnataka
- Dravidian architecture - Badami Chalukyas
- Hindu temple architecture - Badami Chalukya architecture
- Political history of medieval Karnataka - Badami Chalukyas
- Architecture of Karnataka - Badami Chalukya architecture
- Chalukyas of Badami
