= Water tank =

Container for storing water

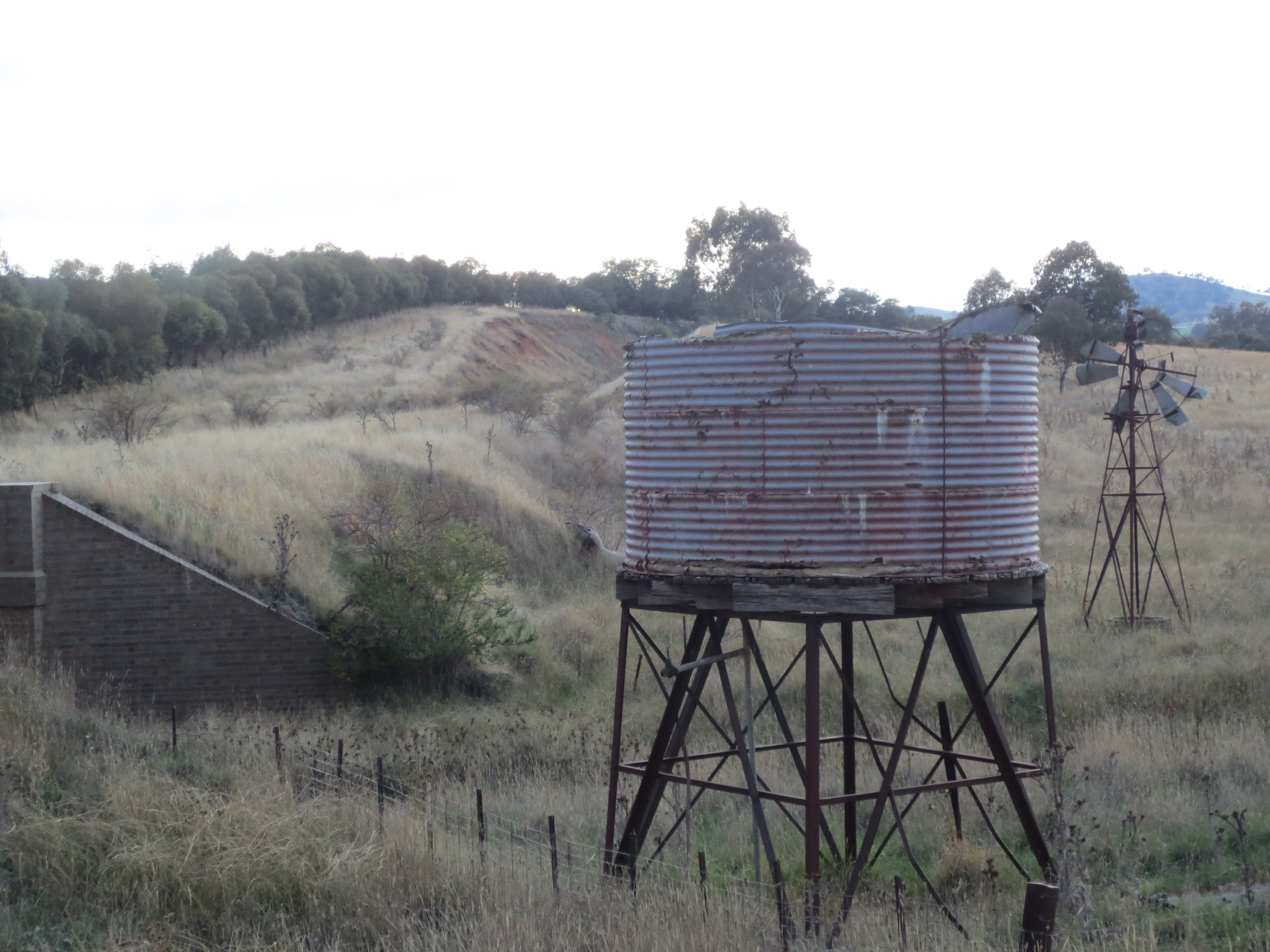
Derelict water tank near the Boorowa railway line, Galong, Australia

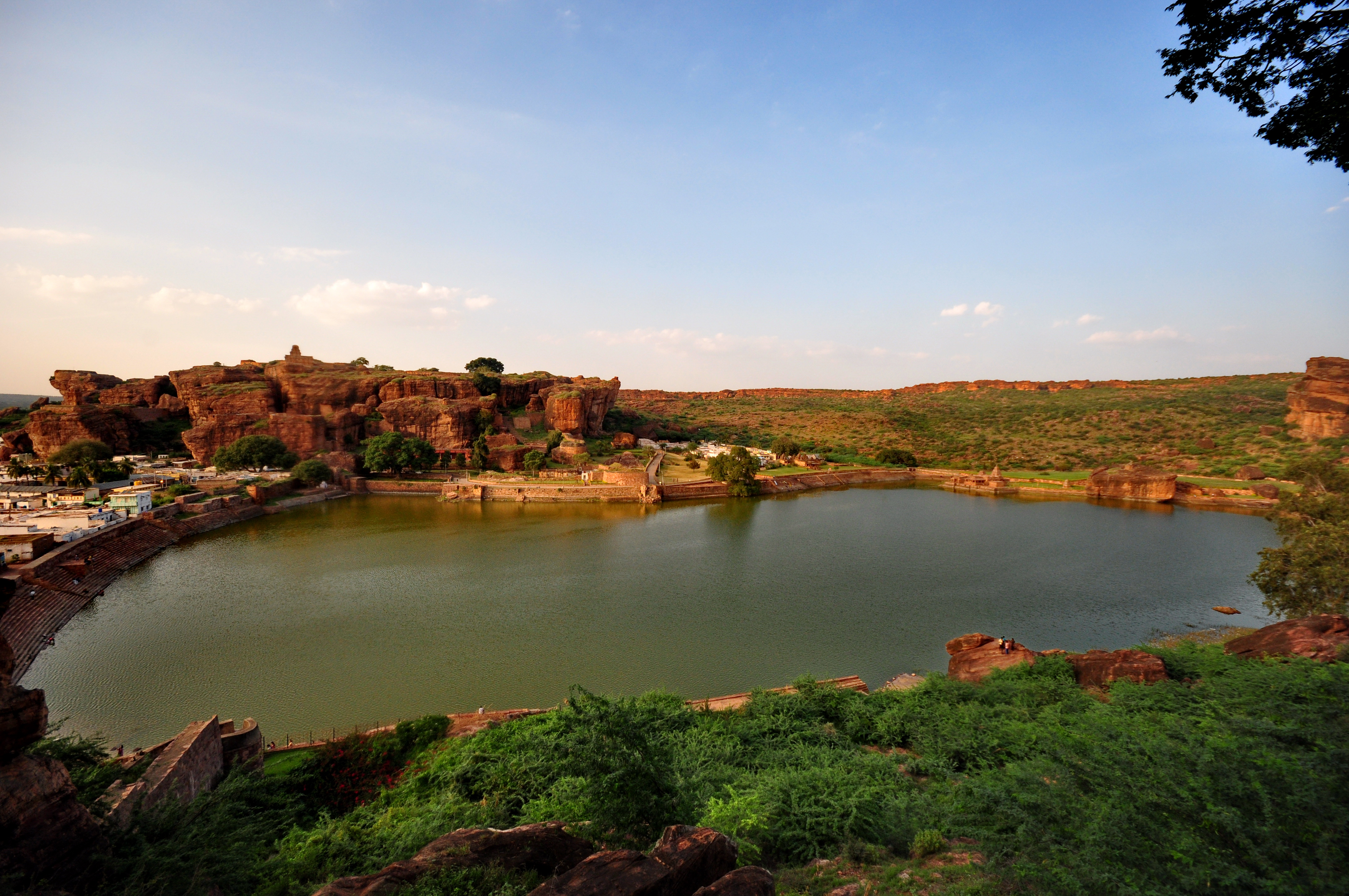
The Agastya lake in South India could have been built as a water tank.

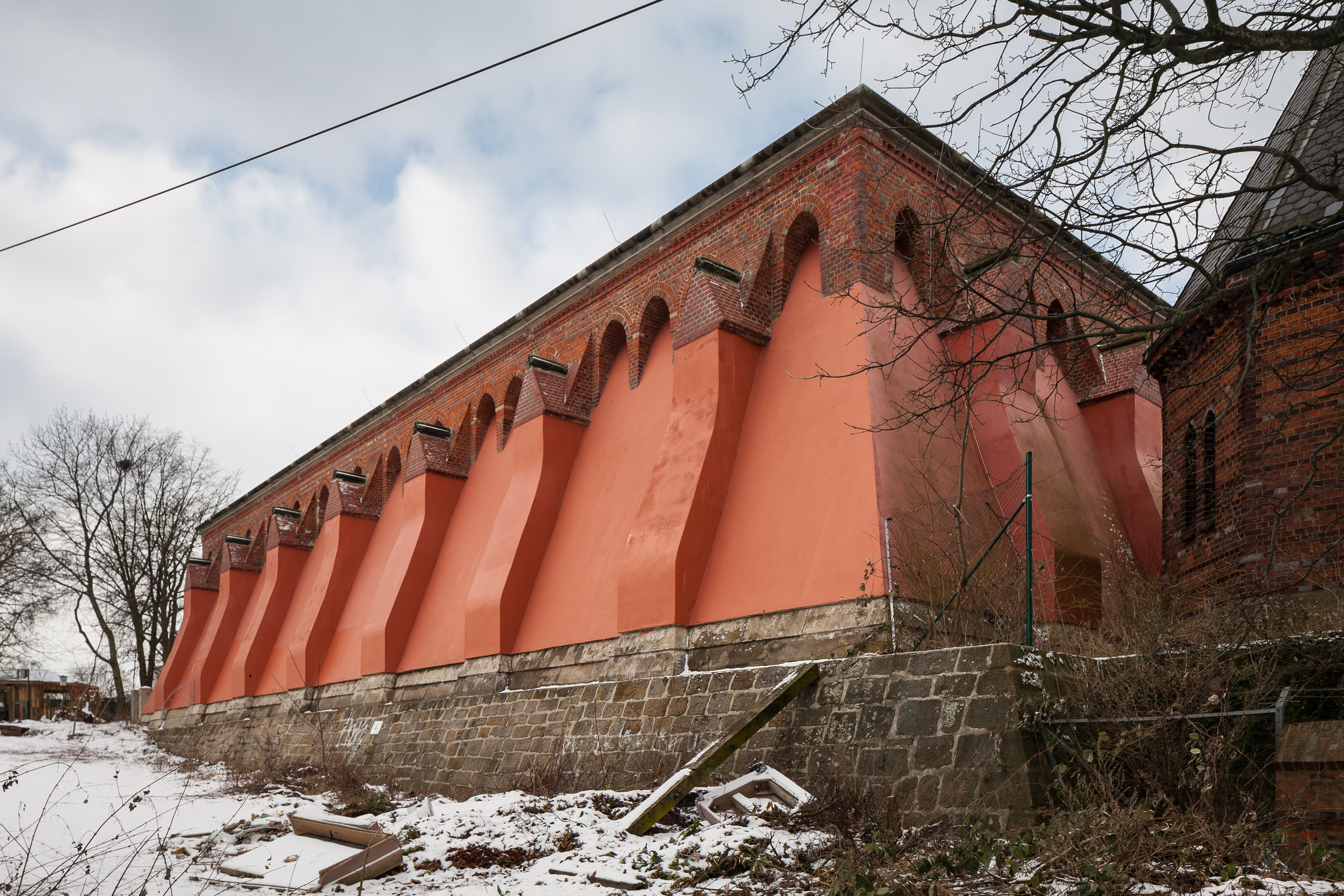
Water tank from 1876 in Hanover, Germany

A water tank is a container used for storing water for many applications, including drinking water supply, irrigation, fire suppression, farming (for both plants and livestock), chemical manufacturing and food preparation. Water tank parameters include the general design of the tank, and choice of construction materials, linings. Various materials are used for making a water tank: plastics (polyethylene, polypropylene), fiberglass, concrete, stone, steel (welded or bolted, carbon, or stainless). Earthen pots, such as matki used in South Asia, can also be used for water storage. Water tanks are an efficient way to help developing countries to store clean water.

== History ==
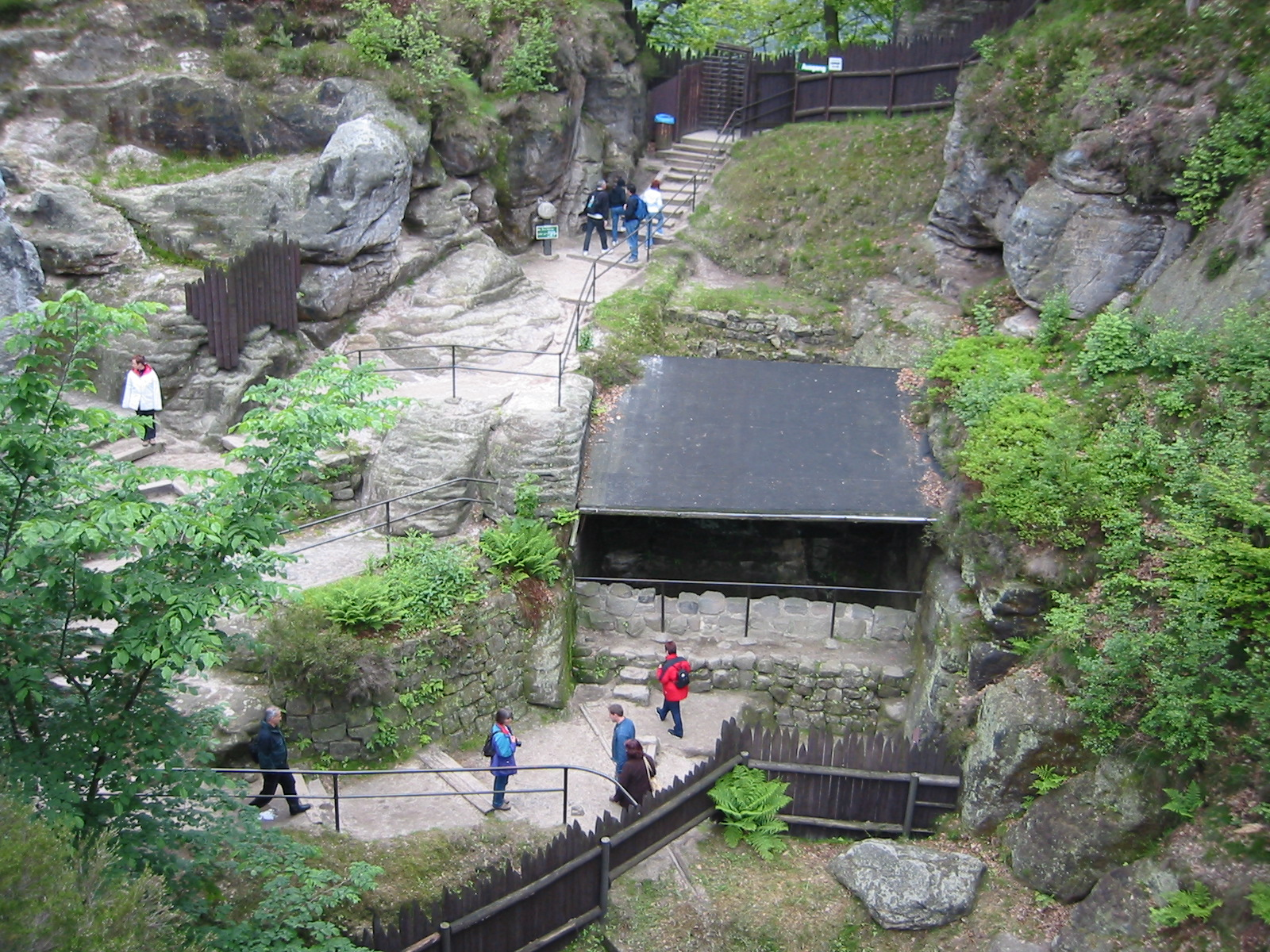
Stone water tank in a castle courtyard, Saxony, Germany

Throughout history, wood, ceramic and stone tanks have been used as water tanks. These containers were all naturally occurring and some man made and a few of these tanks are still in service. The Indus Valley civilization (3000–1500 BC) made use of granaries and water tanks. Medieval castles needed water tanks for the defenders to withstand a siege. A wooden water tank found at the Año Nuevo State Reserve (California) was restored to functionality after being found completely overgrown with ivy. It had been built in 1884.

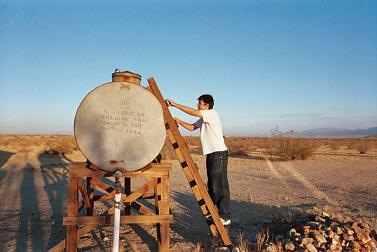
An old-fashioned water tank near Twentynine Palms, California

== Types ==
Chemical contact tank of FDA and NSF polyethylene construction, allows for retention time for chemical treatment chemicals to "contact" (chemically treat) with product water.

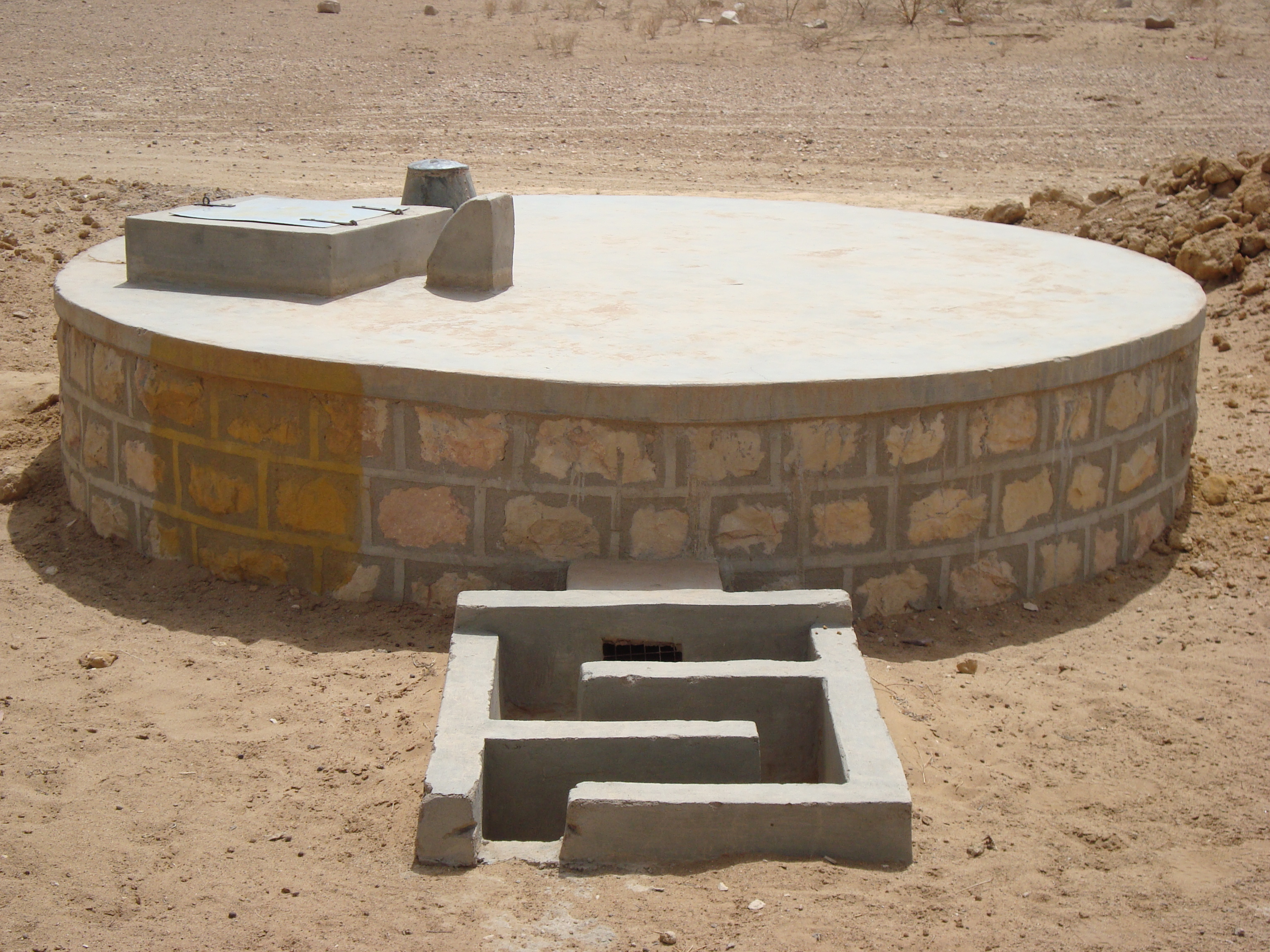
The taanka is used in Rajasthan as a traditional form of rainwater harvesting

Ground water tank, made of lined carbon steel, may receive water from a water well or from surface water, allowing a large volume of water to be placed in inventory and used during peak demand cycles.

An elevated water tank, also known as a water tower, will create a pressure at the ground-level outlet of 1 kPa per 10.2 centimetres (4.0 in) or 1 psi per 2.31 feet (0.70 m) of elevation. Thus a tank elevated to 20 metres creates about 200 kPa and a tank elevated to 70 feet creates about 30 psi of discharge pressure, sufficient for most domestic and industrial requirements.

Vertical cylindrical dome top tanks may hold from 200 litres or fifty gallons to several million gallons. Horizontal cylindrical tanks are typically used for transport because their low-profile creates a low center of gravity helping to maintain equilibrium for the transport vehicle, trailer or truck.

A Hydro-pneumatic tank is typically a horizontal pressurized storage tank. Pressurizing this reservoir of water creates a surge free delivery of stored water into the distribution system.

Glass-reinforced plastic (GRP) tanks/vessels are used to store liquids underground.

== Design ==
Water tank in Seoul, South Korea

By design a water tank or container should do no harm to the water. Water is susceptible to a number of ambient negative influences, including bacteria, viruses, algae, changes in pH, accumulation of minerals, and accumulated gas. The contamination can come from a variety of origins including piping, tank construction materials, animal and bird feces, mineral and gas intrusion. A correctly designed water tank works to address and mitigate these negative effects. It is desirable that water tanks be cleaned annually to reduce delivery of algae, bacteria and viruses to people or animals.

A safety based news article linked copper poisoning as originating from a plastic tank. The article indicated that rainwater was collected and stored in a plastic tank and that the tank did nothing to mitigate the low pH. The water was then brought into homes with copper piping, the copper was released by the high acid rainwater and caused poisoning in humans. Since the plastic tank is an inert container, it has no effect on the incoming water. Good practice would be to analyze any water source periodically and treat accordingly, in this case, the collected acid rain should be analyzed, and pH adjusted before being brought into a domestic water supply system.

The release of copper due to acidic water may be monitored by a variety of technology, beginning with pH strips and going to more sophisticated pH monitors, indicate pH which when acidic or caustic, some with output communication capabilities. Most of the algae growth occurs at an optimum pH, between 8.2 - 8.7. pH level that is neutral or lower can help to reduce the growth of algae. Potential algaecide, shock product will help to clean swimming pools or water tanks from algae. In this process no need to use vacuum cleaner to remove algae. There is no causative link between the plastic tank and copper poisoning, a solution to the problem is to monitor stored rainwater with pH indicators and add appropriate treatment materials.

== See also ==
- Chemical tank – Container for liquids or compressed gas
- Cistern – Waterproof receptacle for holding liquids, usually water
- Domestic water system – Water supplied through a pipe and tap combination
- Hand pump – Type of manually operated pump
- Household drinking water storage
- Intermediate bulk container – Industrial-grade storage and transport container for fluids and solids
- Portable water tank – Portable temporary water container
- Water canister – Medium-sized portable container
- Potable water diving – Underwater diving in potable water systems
- Rainwater tank – Container for collecting and storing rainwater
- Fibre-reinforced plastic tanks and vessels
- Water tower – Elevated structure supporting a tank
- Rooftop water tower
