= Bhutanatha group of temples, Badami =

7th to 12th century temples in Badami

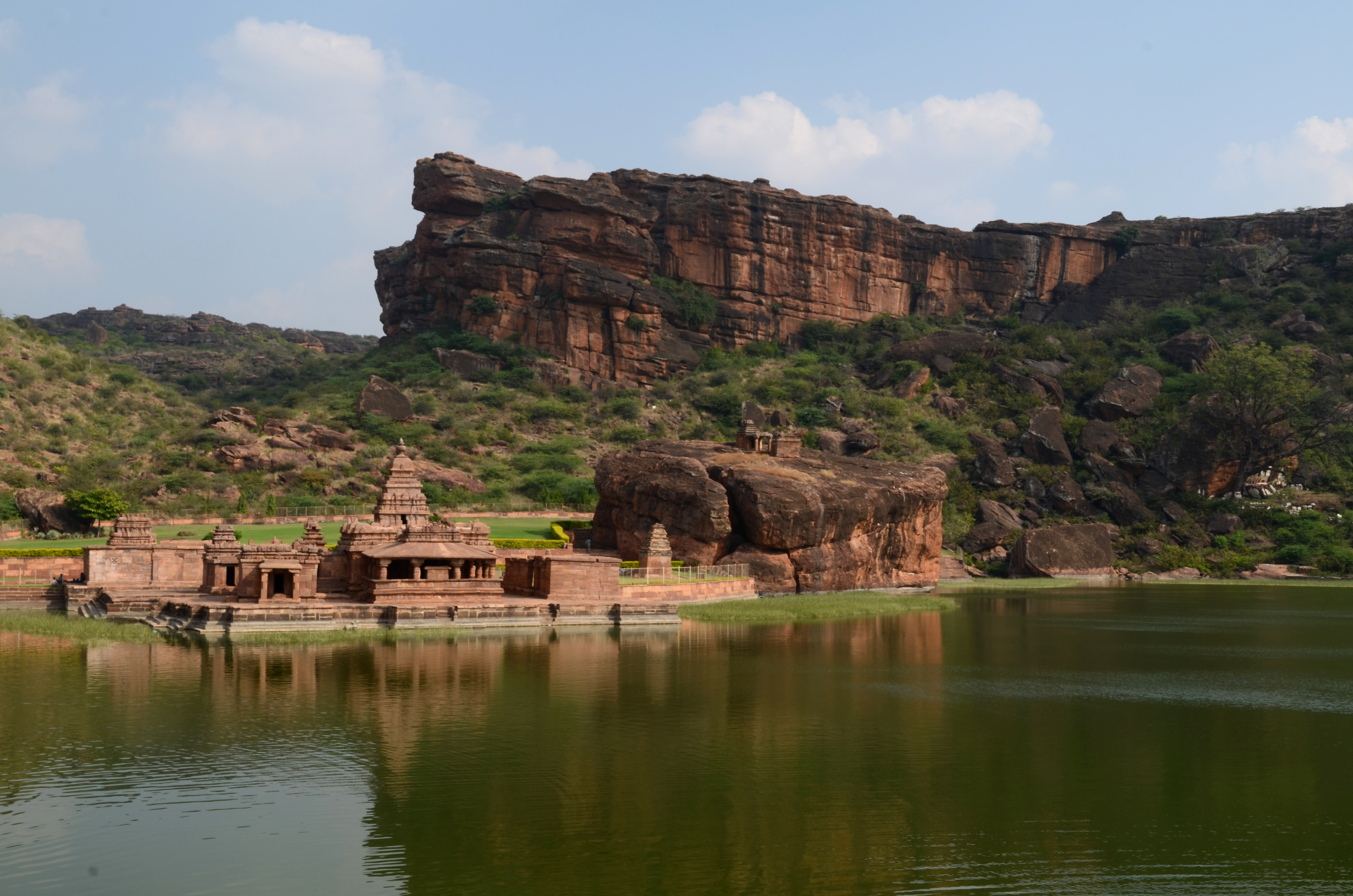
- 7th-to-8th-century Hindu temples complex

- Location within India

Religion
- Affiliation: Hinduism
- Deity: Shiva
- Governing body: Archaeological Survey of India

Location
- Location: Badami, Karnataka
- Coordinates: 15°55′15″N 75°41′16″E

Architecture
- Style: Dravida, Early Chalukya
- Established: 7th to 12th century CE
- Temple: 3

The Bhutanatha group of temples are 7th to 12th century Hindu temples to the east of Agastya lake in Badami, Karnataka state, India. It consists of two subgroups – one called the East Bhutanatha group or Bhutanatha main group from 7th to 8th century mostly in the Dravida architecture style; the other called the North Bhutanatha group or Mallikarjuna group from 11th to 12th century mostly in the Nagara architecture. The former illustrates the Badami Chalukya architects, the latter along with the nearby Yellamma temple the Kalyani Chalukya architects.

== Bhutanatha main group ==
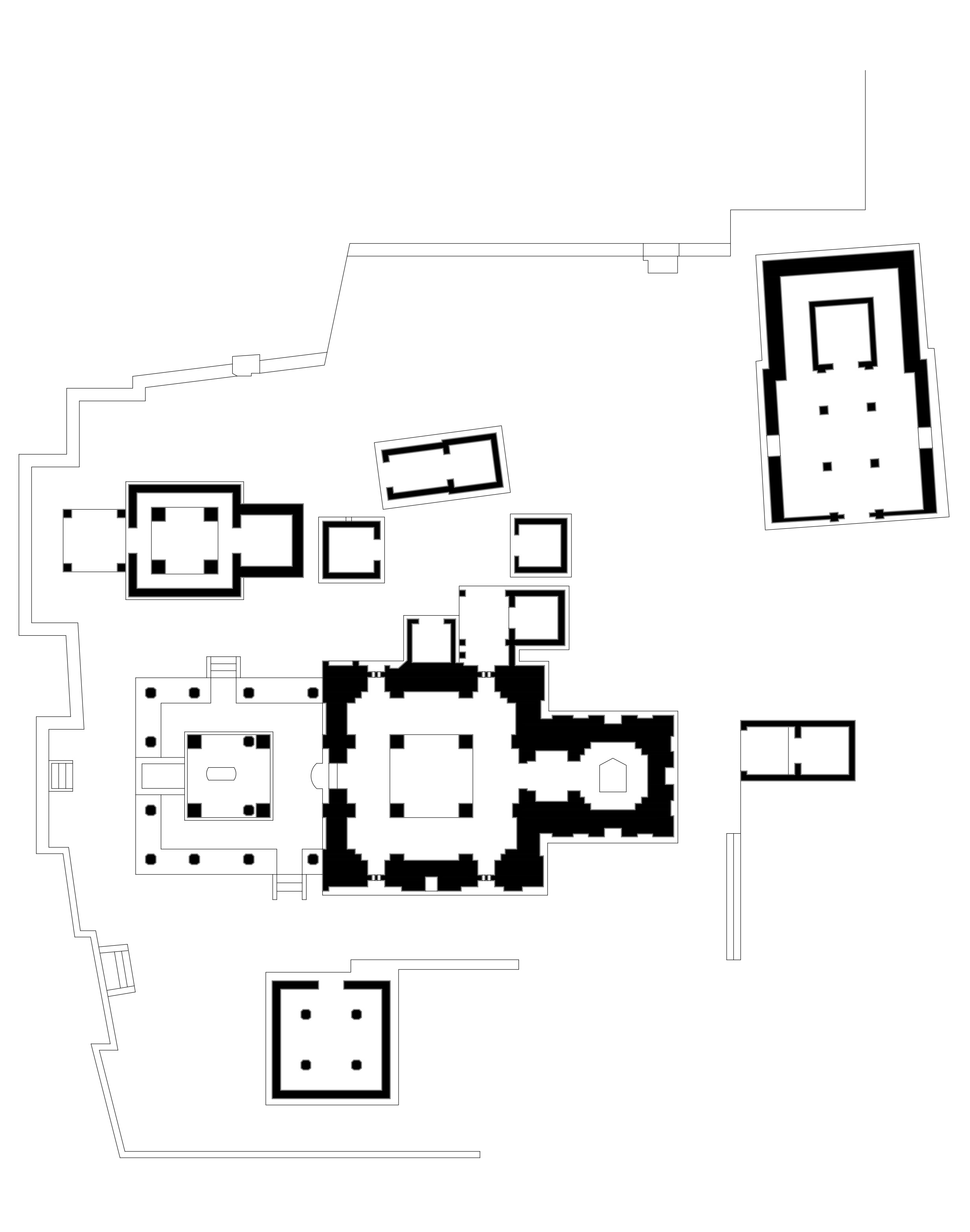
Bhutanatha temples complex, floor plan (lake is to the left edge)

The Bhutanatha main group (700–725 CE) is the older set of Hindu shrines to the east of the Agastya Teertha. The oldest temple in this group is the main large temple. It has a gudha-mandapa with four massive central pillars (partly octagonal, cubical and rounded on a lathe). This mandapa connects to a smaller square-plan sanctum with a Shiva linga. On the top of the sanctum is the Dravida-style tritala superstructure (three storeys). The lower part consists of a padabandha and kumbha. The vimana walls have karnas with Brahmakanta-style pilasters. The wall's nasis depict heads of kinnaras and gandharvas. The second storey of the superstructure repeats the lowest larger storey, and the third storey is half of the second in size, and again repeats the same elements in a rhythmic form. A square vedi topped with a short shikhara completes the superstructure.

The image niches on the wall of the shrine and the hall are now empty though some decorative elements like makharas (mythical beast) with long tails still remain. The mandapa has jali (perforated windows for light into the inner mantapa). On either side of the foot of the shrine doorway is an image of goddess Ganga on her vehicle, the makara, on the right, and on the left, that of goddesses Yamuna riding the tortoise. There is no dedicatory block upon the lintel. Other artwork found nearby include Ganesha and Mahisasuramardini. A notable feature here is the inscription on the outer wall of the temple, which announces a gift from a Paingara family to the Sridharbuteswara (likely an epithet of the deity). This inscription can be dated to about the late 9th century. This suggests the main temple was in active use at the time.

The porch pillars have a square cross section that transforms into an octagonal cross section. Outside, there is a stepped ghat for the devotees and pilgrims. The smaller shrines are ruined and were added later, likely through late 8th century. To the east of the complex, on a boulder, are four Shaiva reliefs with unusual architectural details – these are impressions of four architectural styles of Shiva sanctum with panchakuta superstructure set on a square plan. These can be dated to the late 7th or early 8th century, and help establish that this temple complex was a Shaiva complex from its origin.

To the north of the main temple is a small shrine which, proposed Henry Cousens in 1923, was originally consecrated for Vishnu. At some point, the temple was adopted by the followers of Lingayatism who built an outer hall and installed a Nandi (vehicle of Shiva) and a Shiva linga inside the sanctum.

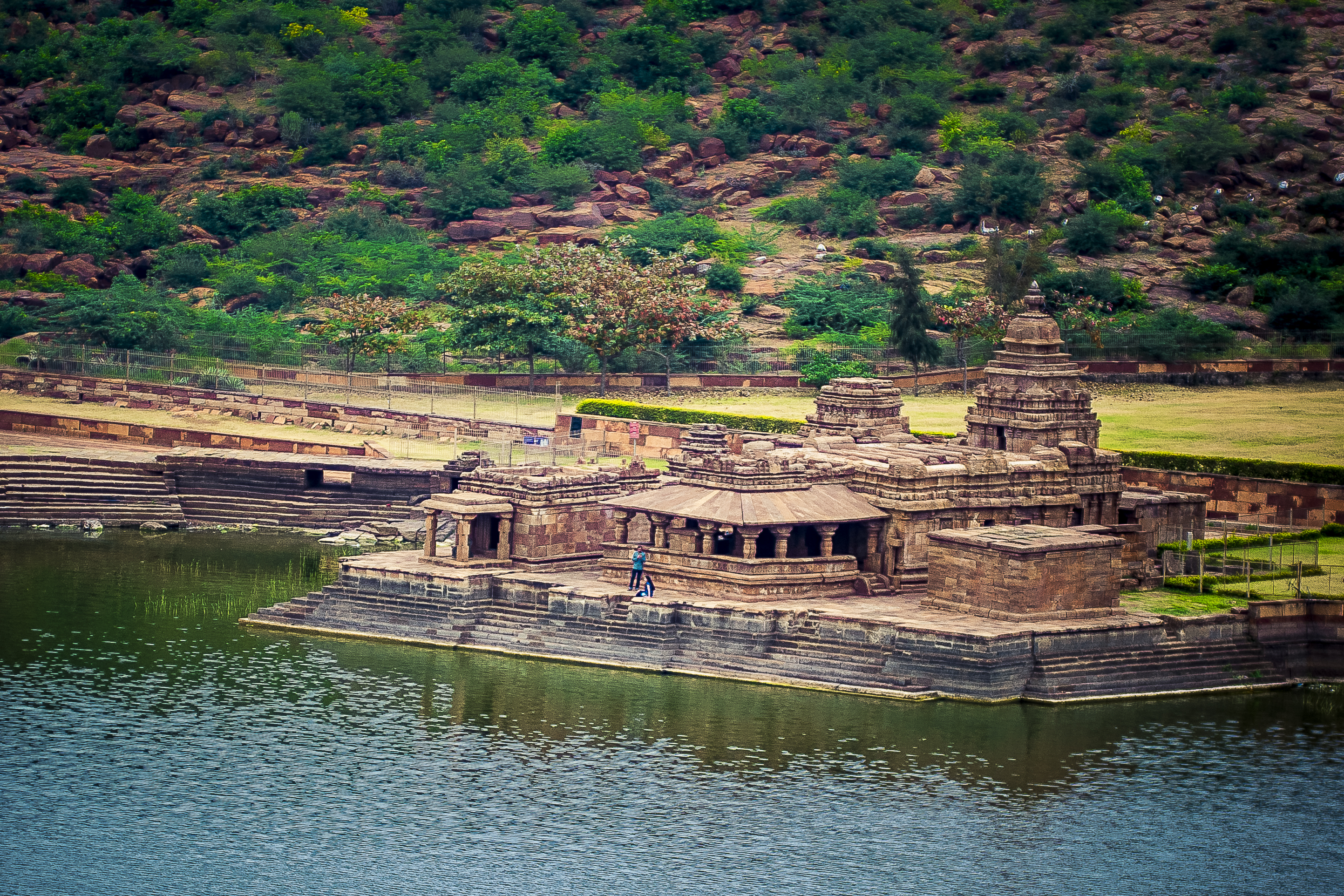
Panoramic view of Bhutanatha group, east of the lake

== Mallikarjuna group ==
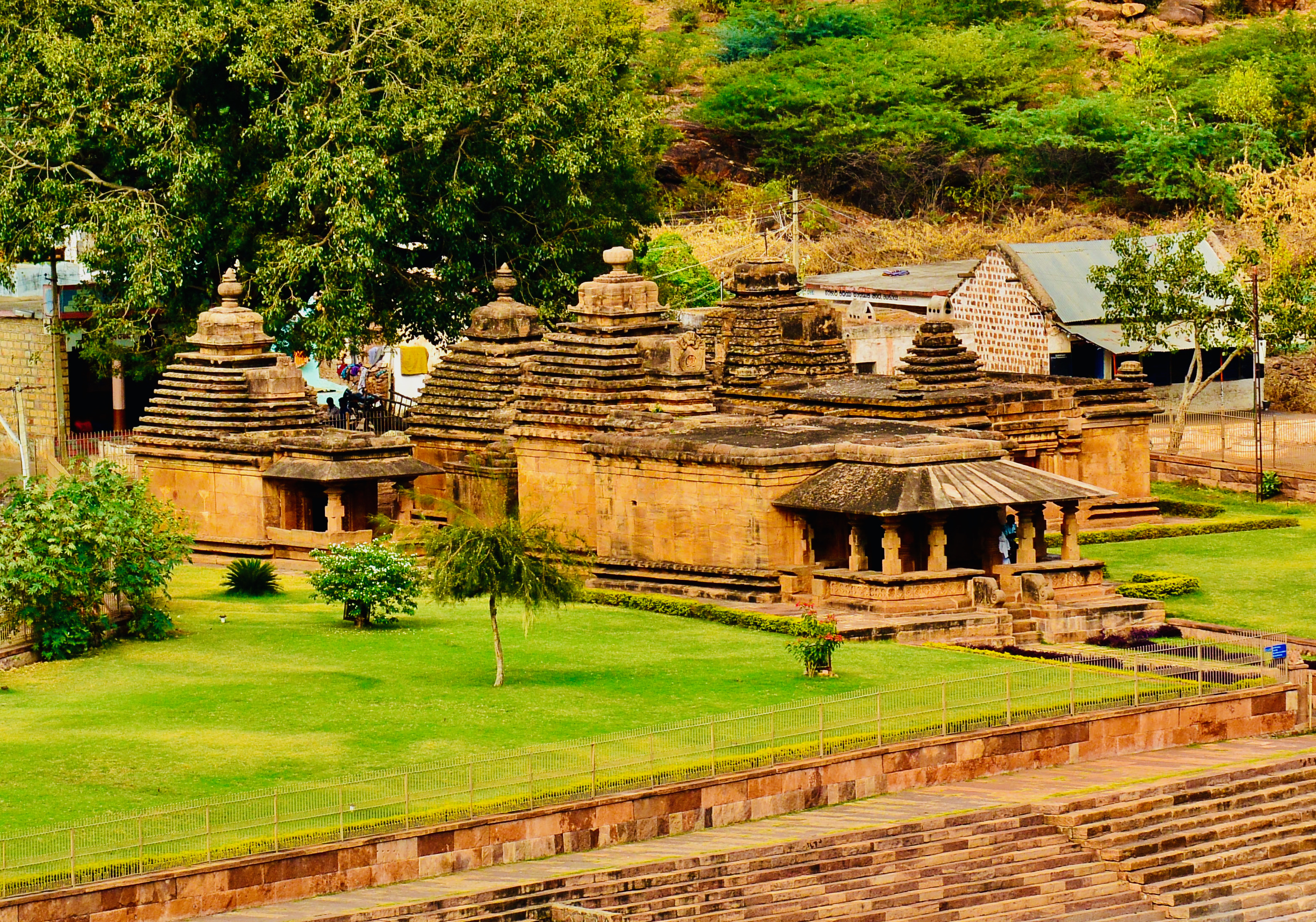
Temples in the Mallikarjuna group, also called the north Bhutanatha group.

The Mallikarjuna group is close to the main Bhutanatha group, but located on the north back of the manmade lake. It consists of several temples. These open to the south and are marked by their notable pyramidal superstructure in the 11th- to 12th-century phamsana Nagara style. The largest temple was probably originally a Vishnu temple. After a period of disuse, it was re-consecrated with a Shiva linga, and the remains of its earlier artwork were preserved. These temples present the construction ideas explored by the Kalyani Chalukya architects. The largest temple has an open rectangular mandapa with eight pillars, that connects to an inner mandapa, antarala and garbhagriya – all on a square plan. All temples in this group have simpler walls, angled eaves over the open mantapa (hall). The artwork found in this group includes both Vishnu and Shiva.
