= Alampur Museum =

Archaeological museum in Alampur, India

Coordinates: 15.8776398°N 78.134898°E

- Location: Alampur, Telangana, India.

Alampur ASI Museum is a museum located in the historical temple town of Alampur, Mahbubnagar in Telangana. Situated at the Navabrahma Temples it is maintained by Archaeological Survey of India.

== History ==
The Alampur museum was established in the year 1952. The museum is neighbored by the popular Nava Brahma temples where over 124 stones sculptures and 26 inscriptional slabs are on display including 64 loose sculptures. The time of these sculptures goes from sixth to sixteenth Century AD and they belong to Kakatiyas, Chalukyas, and Vijayanagara dynasties. The Alampur gallery is famous for its huge and varied collection of sculptures that are organized in a major corridor. The collections on display have many beautiful pieces, a few of them in cleaned black stone that show that these are from the eleventh century Kakatiyas.

== The collection ==
It has a collection of large and varied sculptures. Most of the specimens are from the 7th century Chalukya period and some of the stones are from the 12th century Kakatiya period. It contains the images of Shiva with Asthadigpalakas and ceilings of Kakatiyas with the image of Nataraja along with the Nandi facing it.
