= Alampur Papanasi Temples =

Alampuram Papanasi Temples
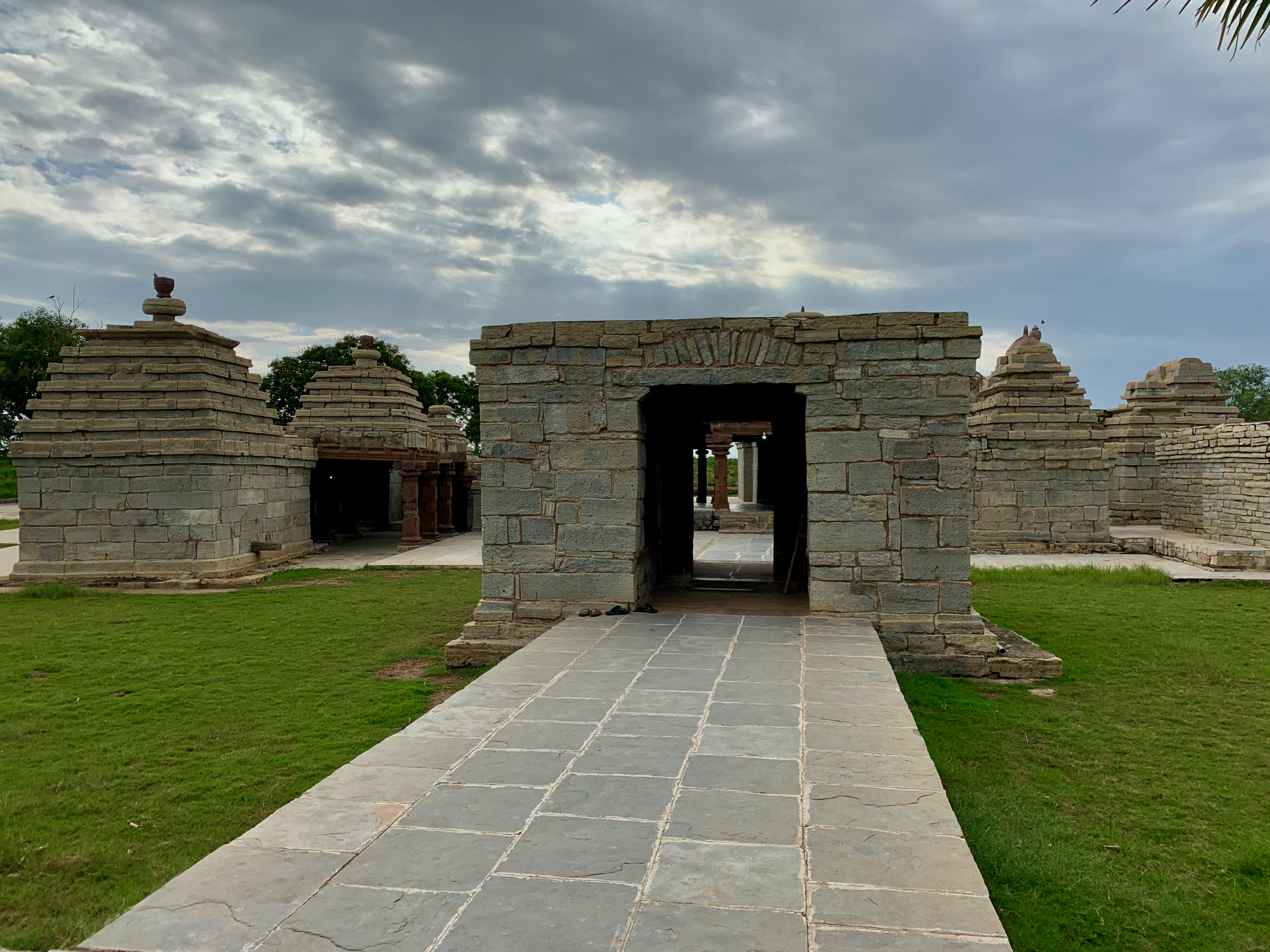
- Some of the twenty three temples

- Location in Telangana Alampur Papanasi Temples (Telangana)

Religion
- Affiliation: Hinduism
- District: Jogulamba Gadwal district
- Deity: Shiva, Devi, Vishnu, others

Location
- Location: Alampuram
- State: Telangana
- Country: India
- Interactive map of Alampuram Papanasi Temples
- Coordinates: 15°52′17.3″N 78°07′22.8″E

Architecture
- Style: Nagara
- Completed: 9th to 11th century
- Temple: 23

Alampuram Papanasi Temples are a group of twenty three Hindu temples dated between 9th- and 11th-century that have been relocated to the southwest of Alampuram village in Telangana. This cluster of mostly ruined temples are co-located near the meeting point of Tungabhadra River and Krishna River at the border of Andhra Pradesh. They are about 1.5 kilometers from the Alampur Navabrahma Temples of the Shaivism tradition, but completed a few centuries later by the Rashtrakutas and later Chalukyas.

The Papanasi temples exhibit the Nagara architecture with a square plan. The Papanasisesvara temple is the largest of Papanasi group. It has a square plan, a phamsana superstructure with a brahmachchanda-griva sikhara, plain outer walls and rangamandapa inside. The temple is dedicated to dancing Shiva (Nataraja, Natesha).

Together with the Navabrahma temples, the Papanasi group were related to the Kalamukha and Pashupata sect of Shaivism. Additional temples in this region made the site a Shaktism pitha. All of these temples featured Vaishnavism themes and narrated Hindu texts in their arts. Together these formed the Brahmeshvara Sthana tirtha (Kshetra), and before their destruction in the 14th and 15th centuries during Delhi Sultanate invasions and associated Muslim-Hindu conflict, they wielded enormous influence in regional religious life. Some historic Hindu and Buddhist literature refers to this site near Kurnool as Srisaila or Sriparvata. According to David White, this site in 12th century also became linked with the Shaivism sect called Virasaiva or Lingayats.

The Papanasi temple group is not at the original location. They have been moved and restored from their ruins by the Archaeological Survey of India after 1980. They were threatened by the Srisailam hydroelectric project, but they were moved to higher grounds and a barrage built to protect them which has saved them from further damage. Excavations associated with this transplantation of the temples unearthed evidence of temple building rituals.

== Location ==
The Alampuram Navabrahma temples are located in the Telangana village of Alampur, at the confluence (sangam) of two major rivers, the Tungabhadra and Krishna. It is 215 kilometres (134 mi) south of Hyderabad, connected by the four-lane National Highway 44 (Asian Highway 43), and about 240 kilometres (150 mi) northeast of Hampi monuments and 325 kilometres (202 mi) east of Badami, the capital of the kings who are credited with building it in the 7th century.

== Gallery ==
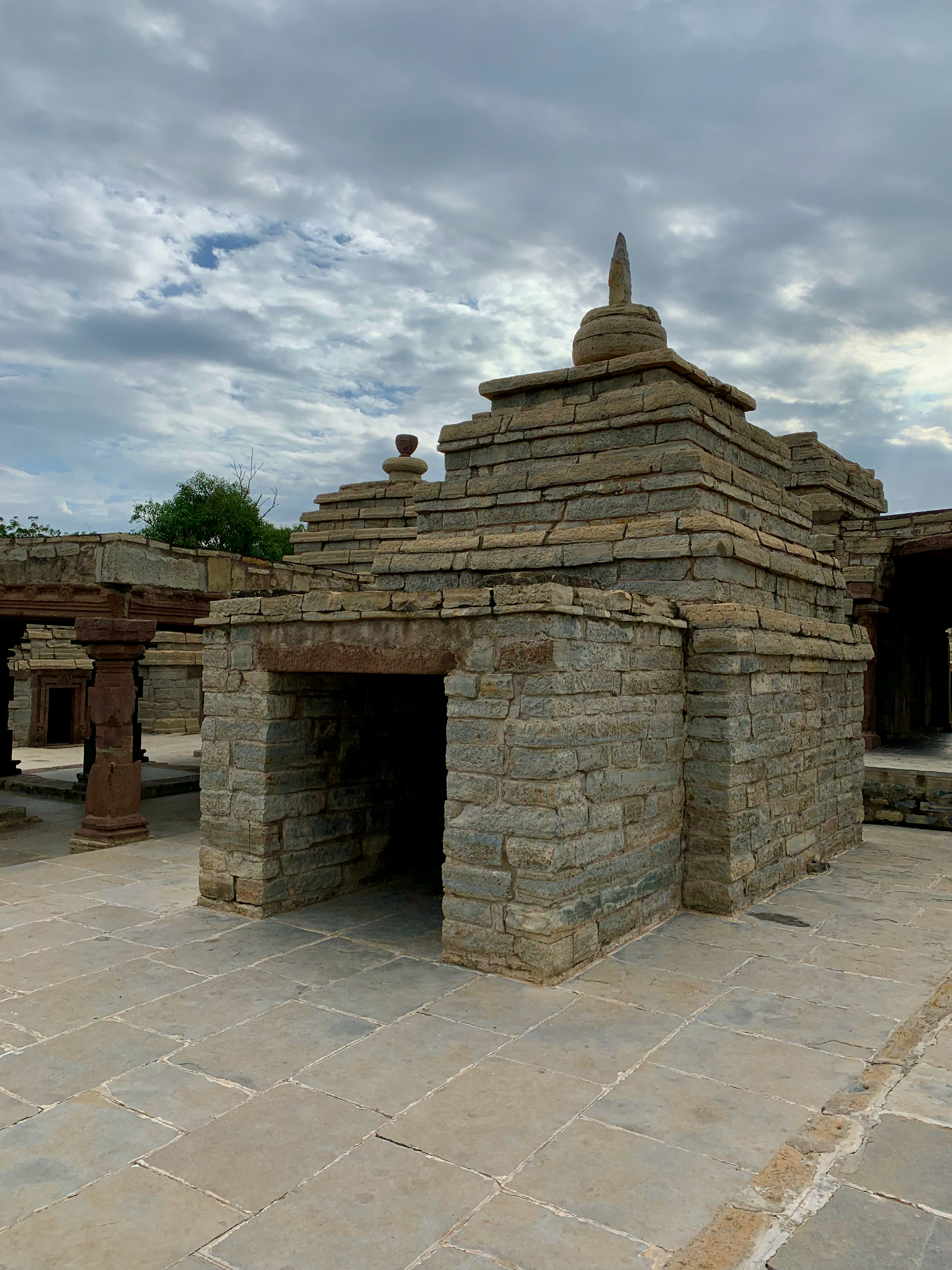
One of the temples

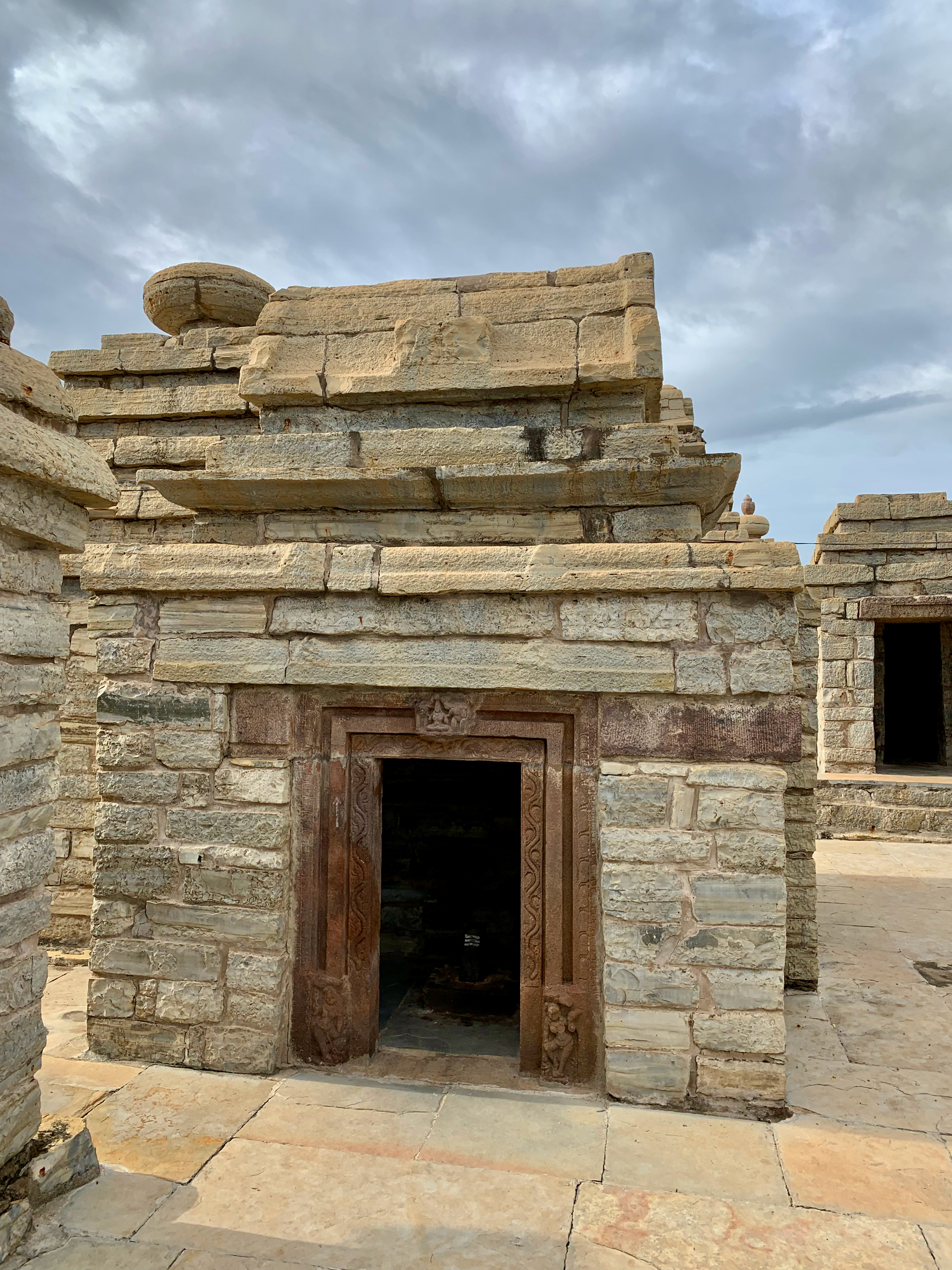
Another temple with Ganga and Yamuna goddesses, plus Vimana

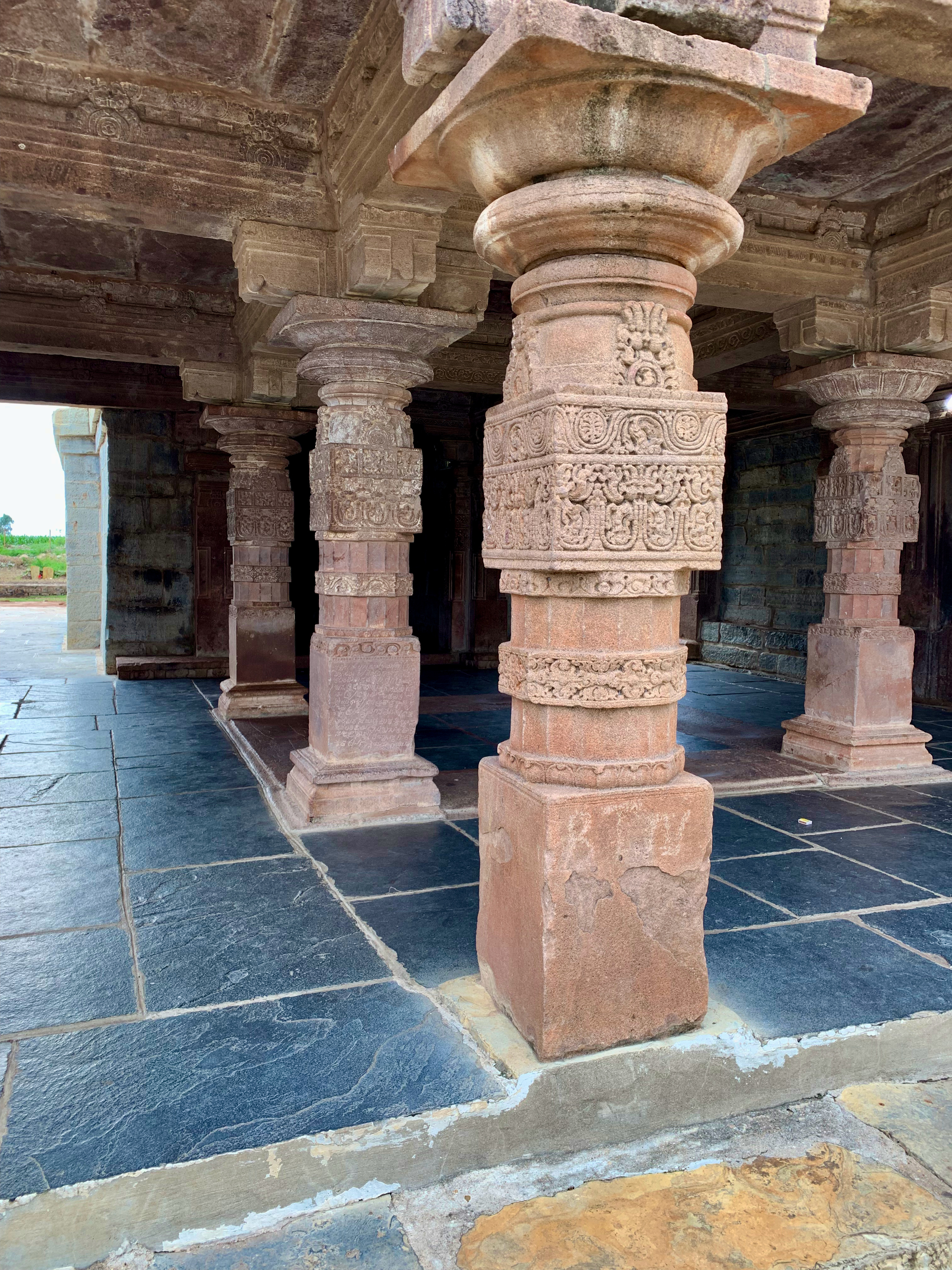
The mandapam of the largest temple

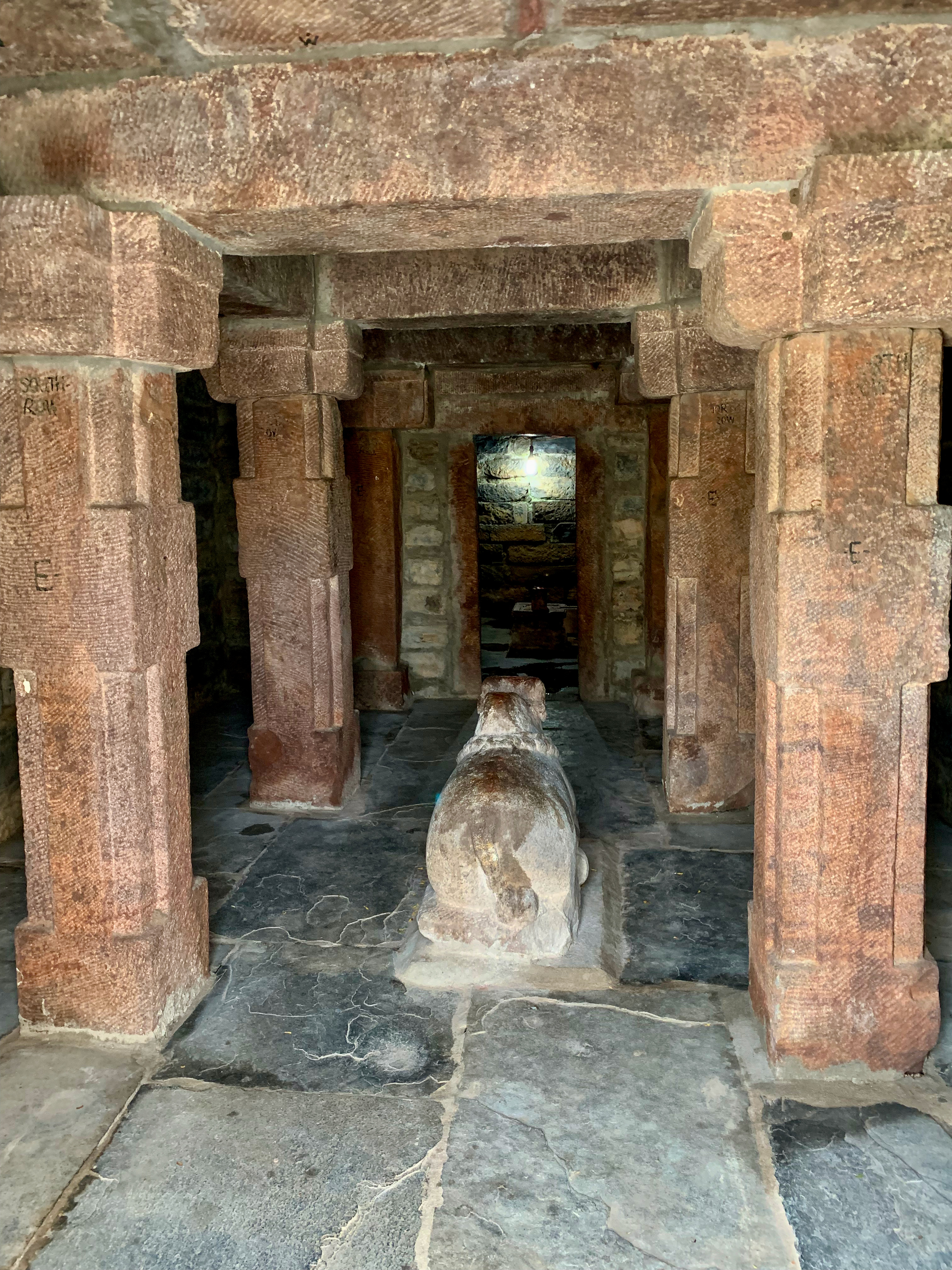
Nandi facing the sanctum

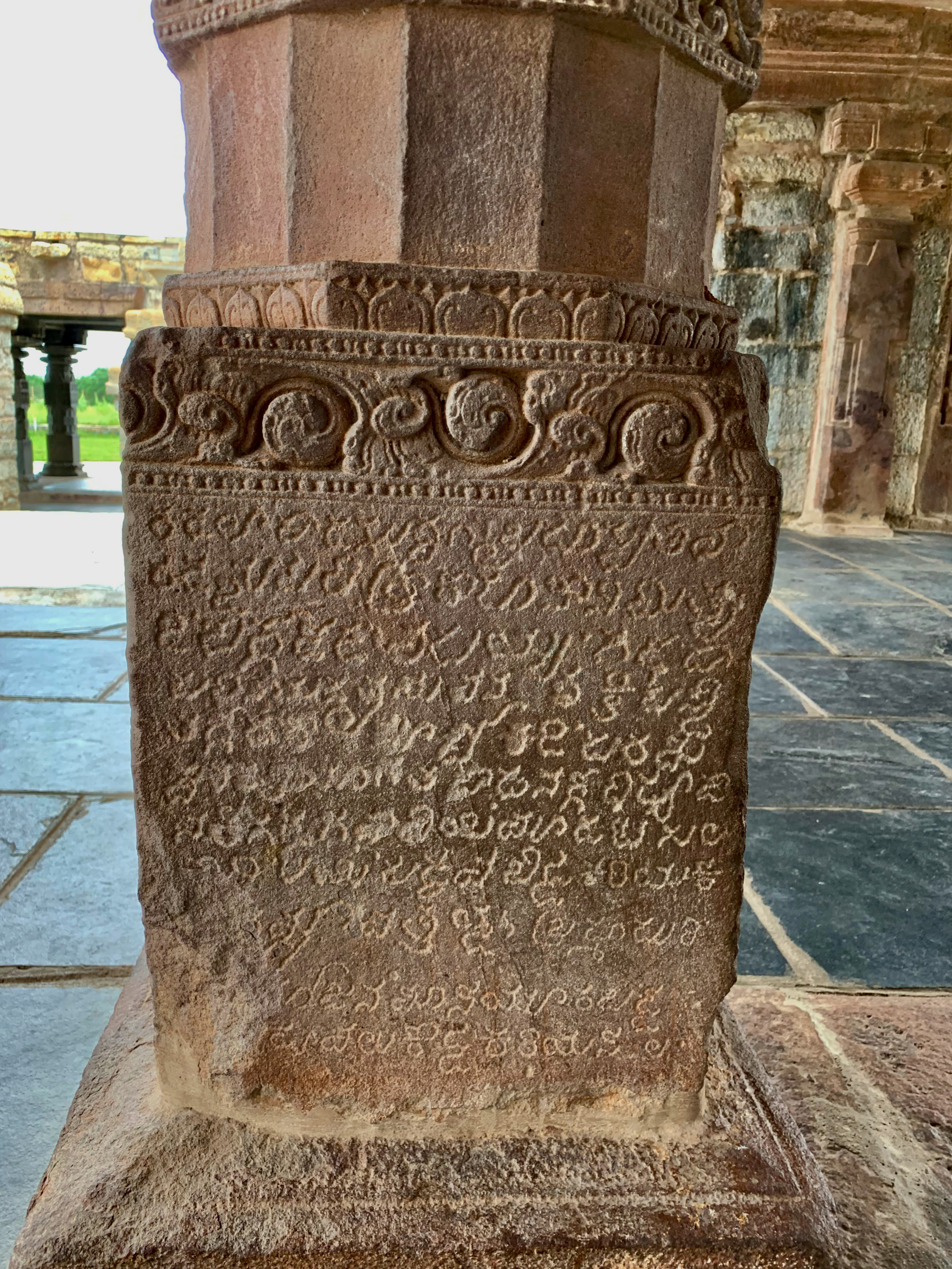
A 10th-century inscription

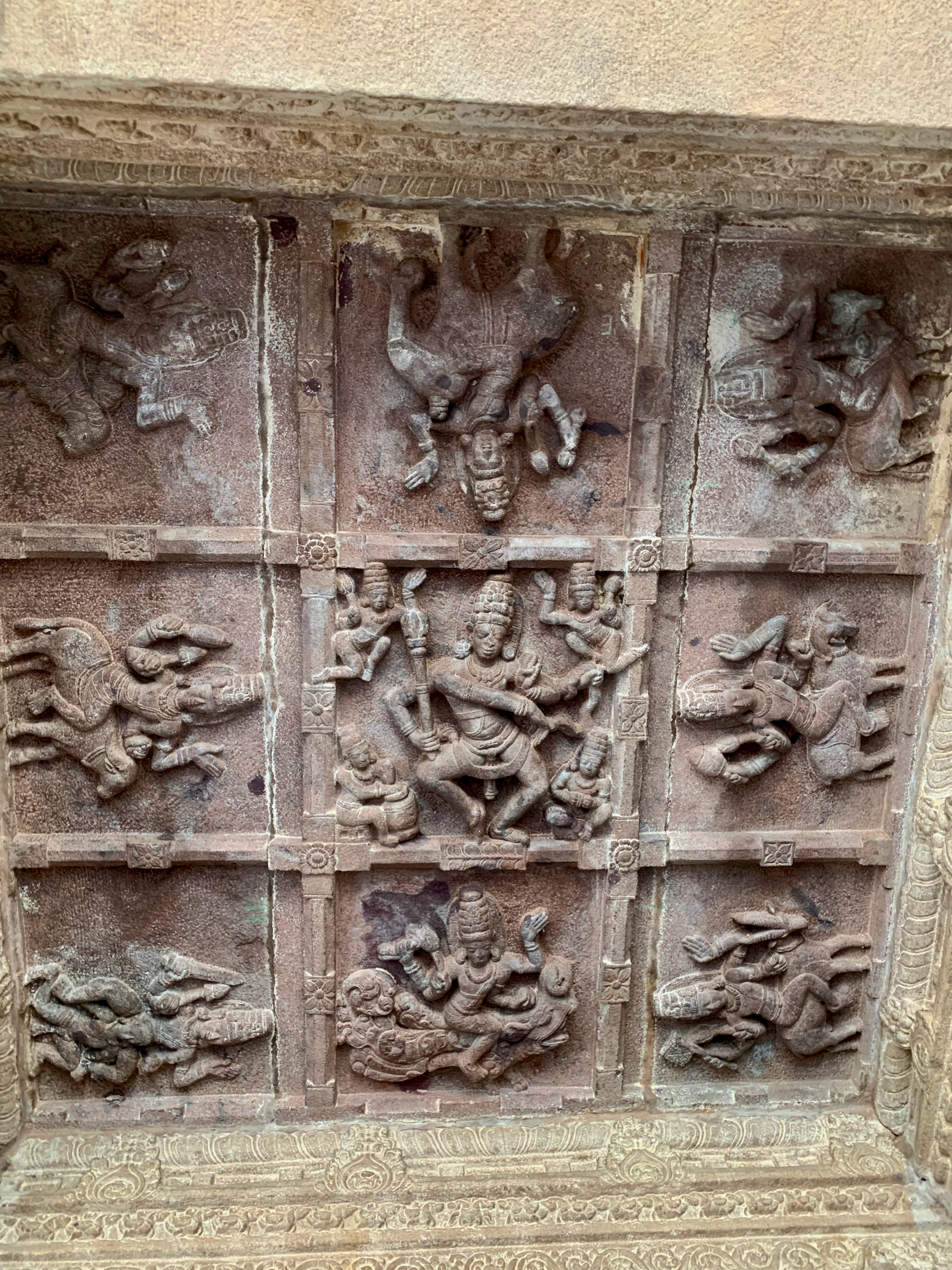
Nataraja and directional deities carved in ceiling

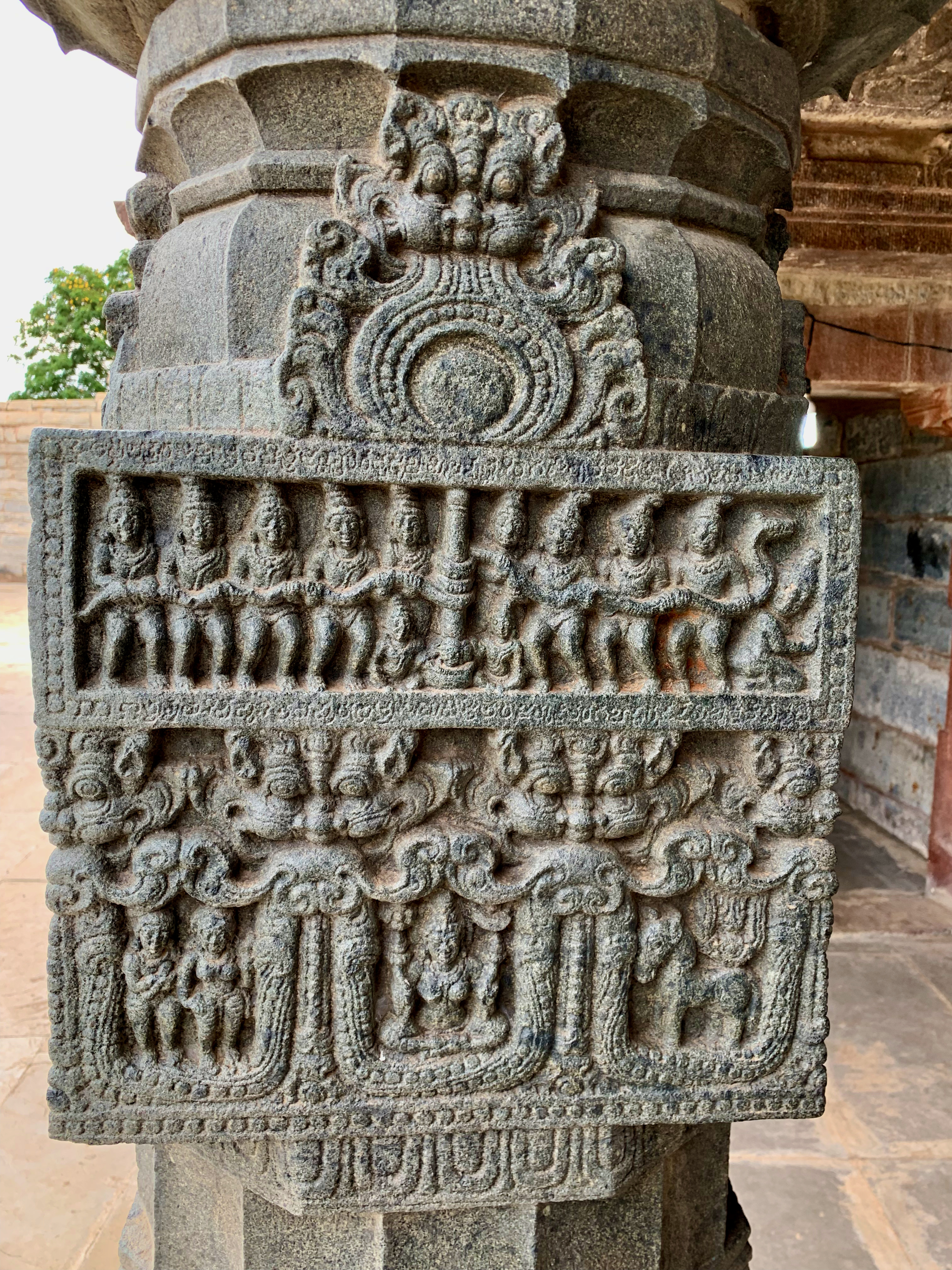
A relief showing the Vedic legend of samudra-manthan

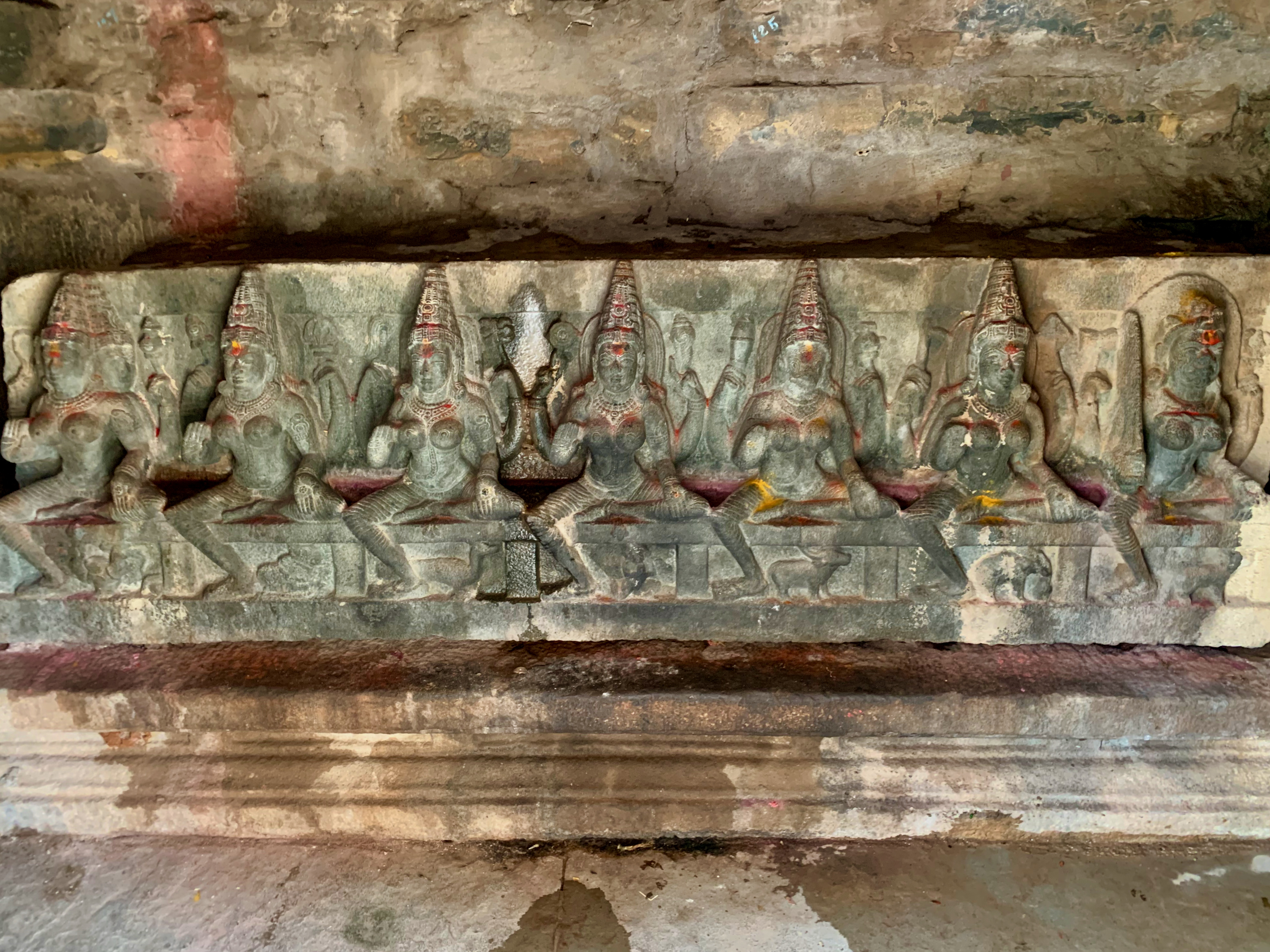
Saptamatrikas (Shaktism)

== See also ==
- Aihole
- Pattadakal
- Alampuram Navabrahma Temples
