= Alampur Navabrahma Temples =

Hindu temples in India dating from the 7th and 9th centuries

Alampuram Navabrahma Temples
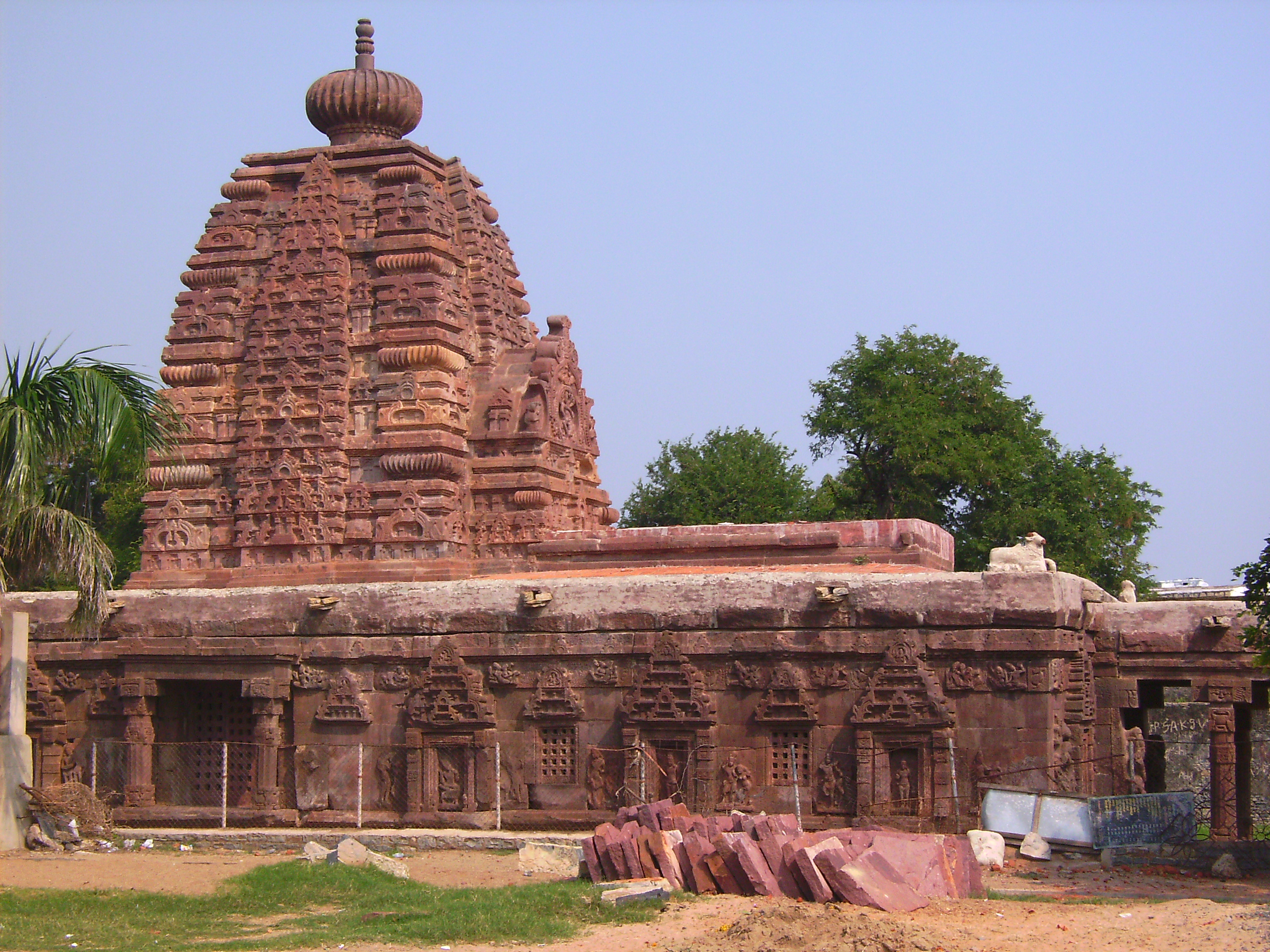
- Svarga Brahma Temple

- Location in Telangana Alampur Navabrahma Temples (Telangana)

Religion
- Affiliation: Hinduism
- District: Jogulamba Gadwal district
- Deity: Shiva, others

Location
- Location: Alampuram (Hemalapuram)
- State: Telangana
- Country: India
- Coordinates: 15°52′40.1″N 78°08′5.4″E

Architecture
- Style: Nagara
- Completed: 7th century
- Temple: 9

Alampuram Navabrahma Temples are a group of nine early Badami Chalukyan Hindu temples dated between the 7th and 9th centuries that are located at Alampuram (Hemalapuram) in Telangana, India, near the meeting point of Tungabhadra River and Krishna River at the border of Andhra Pradesh. They are called Nava-Brahma temples though they are dedicated to Shiva. They exemplify early North Indian Nagara style architecture with cut rock as the building block. The temples of Alampur resemble the style of Pattadakal, Aihole style as they were Karnata Dravida, Vesara style native to Karnataka.

The temples are significant for their east-facing simple square plans, intricate carvings of themes of Shaivism, Vaishnavism and Shaktism. They also contain early examples of friezes that narrate legends from Hindu texts such as the Panchatantra fables. The temples were a significant influence on the later era Kakatiya Hindu temples.

These temples were built by the Badami Chalukyas rulers, and early 8th-century inscriptions found at the site suggest that the site also had a Shaiva matha (Hindu monastery) which has not survived. Their ruins have been restored by the Archaeological Survey of India after 1980.

The Alampuram Navabrahma temples were badly damaged and defaced during the Islamic invasion of this region in and after the 14th century. A series of religious wars and conquest led to the construction of an Islamic fort, a mosque and a graveyard called Shah Ali Pedda Dargah being built midst the Navabrahma temples over the 15th to 17th centuries. This construction was completed in part using the temple walls and ruined masonry from the temples, according to Ghulam Yazdani – an archaeologist who surveyed these temples and the Islamic monuments among them in 1926–27 for the Nizam of Hyderabad. The Hindus abandoned worship in temples in immediate vicinity of these Sultanate-era additions.

== Location ==
The Alampuram Navabrahma temples are located in the Telangana town of Alampuram, close to the Tungabhadra river. It is 215 kilometres (134 mi) south of Hyderabad, connected by the four-lane National Highway 44 (Asian Highway 43), and about 240 kilometres (150 mi) northeast of Hampi monuments and 325 kilometres (202 mi) east of Badami, the capital of the kings who are credited with building it in the 7th century.

== History ==
=== Sangameswara Temple ===
The Sangameswara Temple was originally built at Kudavelly, by the confluence (sangam) of two major sacred rivers of ancient importance, the Tungabhadra and Krishna. Sangameswara comes from the word Sangam meaning confluence of two or more rivers. The Sangameswara Temple was constructed by Pulakesi I ( 540 CE to 566 CE), in a similar style to the Navabrahma Temples. Based on inscriptional evidence such as the Tummayaneru grant, Sarma dates the temple to pre-Chalukya era when Navabrahma temples were built. Odile Divakaran states that the Sangameswara temple at Kudaveli was not an earlier monument, but was built along with the nine Navabrahma temples, likely in the middle of the 7th century. According to Sarma, new inscriptions found in the 1980s at the Arka Brahma and Bala Brahma temples mention a pre-existing mahadevayatana or main temple with linga, the Sangameswara Temple.

The Sangameswara Temple has been moved to near the Navabrahma temples, as its original site built at Kudavelly, some 20 km away, is now flooded by the Srisailam Dam hydroelectric project. The Sangameswara temple transplantation was completed by January 1990.

=== Navabrahma temples ===
As the Badami Chalukyan kingdom became well established, its rulers sponsored the distinct Badami Chalukya architecture style of Hindu temple architecture in Aihole, Badami, Alampur and later Pattadakal. The nine temples at this site reflect some of the early Nagara style of Hindu temples that have partially survived for scholarly studies. The uniqueness of this group of temples lies in their plan and design in the northern architectural style introduced by the Chalukyas of Badami in the 7th century.

== Description ==
The temples are emblematic of the Northern Indian Nagara style of architecture. The Navabrahma temples are present on the left bank of the Tungabhadra River, enclosed in a courtyard.

The temples have a square plan that follow the vastupurushamandala architecture. A square sanctum is surrounded by a covered circumambulation path and a Rekha-nagara style curvilinear square shikara towers above the sanctum of each temple. The tower is capped by an amla and a kalasha, though in some cases this has not survived. In front of each sanctum is a mandapa.

- Taraka Brahma: This is an unusual early stage Hindu temple because it has a multistorey tower and for carving deities into the ceiling, suggesting that the artisans were experimenting and exploring novel construction ideas in stone temples by the 7th century. This temple, as others, incorporates 6th-7th century CE Telugu and Kannada inscriptions.

Svarga Brahma temple plan.

- Svarga Brahma: Swarga Brahma temple was built during 681-696 AD or the Vinayaditya era. An inscription found in the temple states that Lokaditya Ela Arasa built it in the honour of the queen. It is an example of Badami Chalukya Architecture and sculpture. This temple is the most elaborately ornamented temple. Its square plan is simple, and it includes a mukhachatuski, a gudhamandapa, an antarala and a garbhagriya. It has a porch in front with fluted shafts and foliage motifs. It has a pair of dikpalas (directional guardians) in each corner of the temple. The temple shows two Nataraja (dancing Shiva), one Lingobhava (Shiva emerging from a linga), one Dakshinamurti (Shiva in yoga position as a teacher sitting under a tree). The temple also has common life scenes, as well as amorous couples in various stages of courtship and kama. The temple has friezes showing four fables from the Panchatantra, along with a Sanskrit inscription below that summarizes the moral of each fable. One of its niches has a sculpture narrating the Vamana-Trivikrama legend of Vishnu.
Svarga Brahma temple
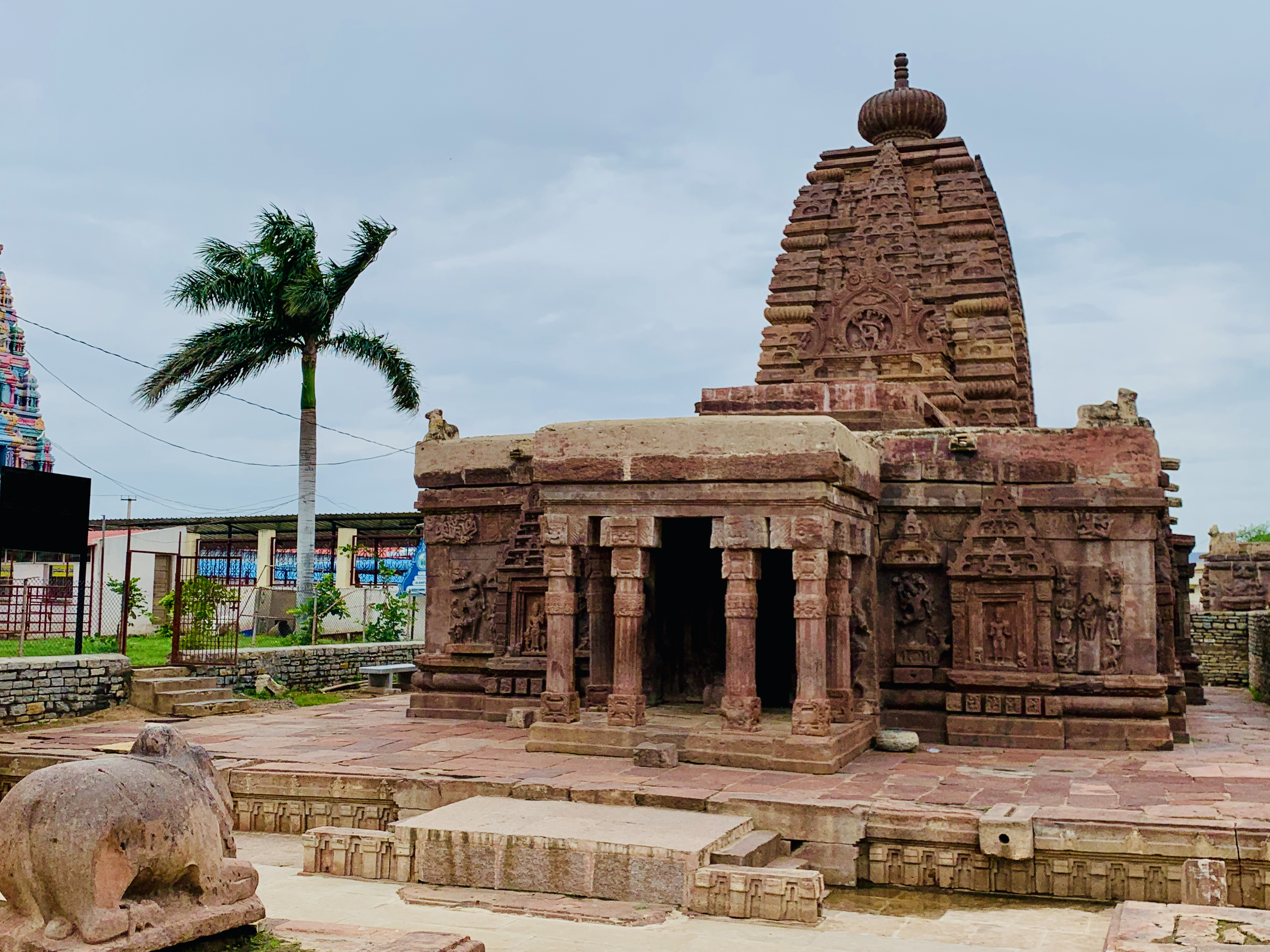
Temple overview

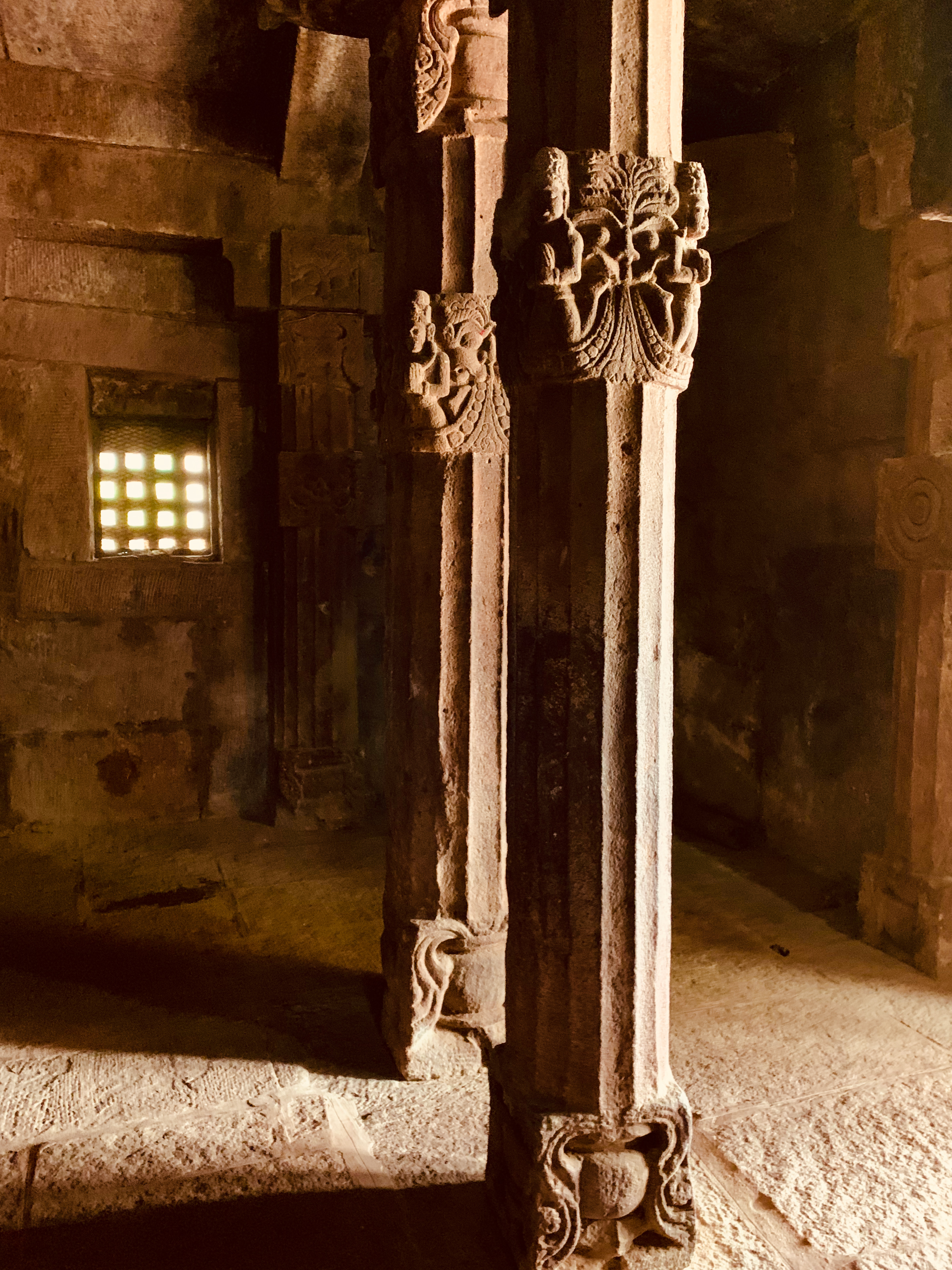
Mandapa and pillars inside

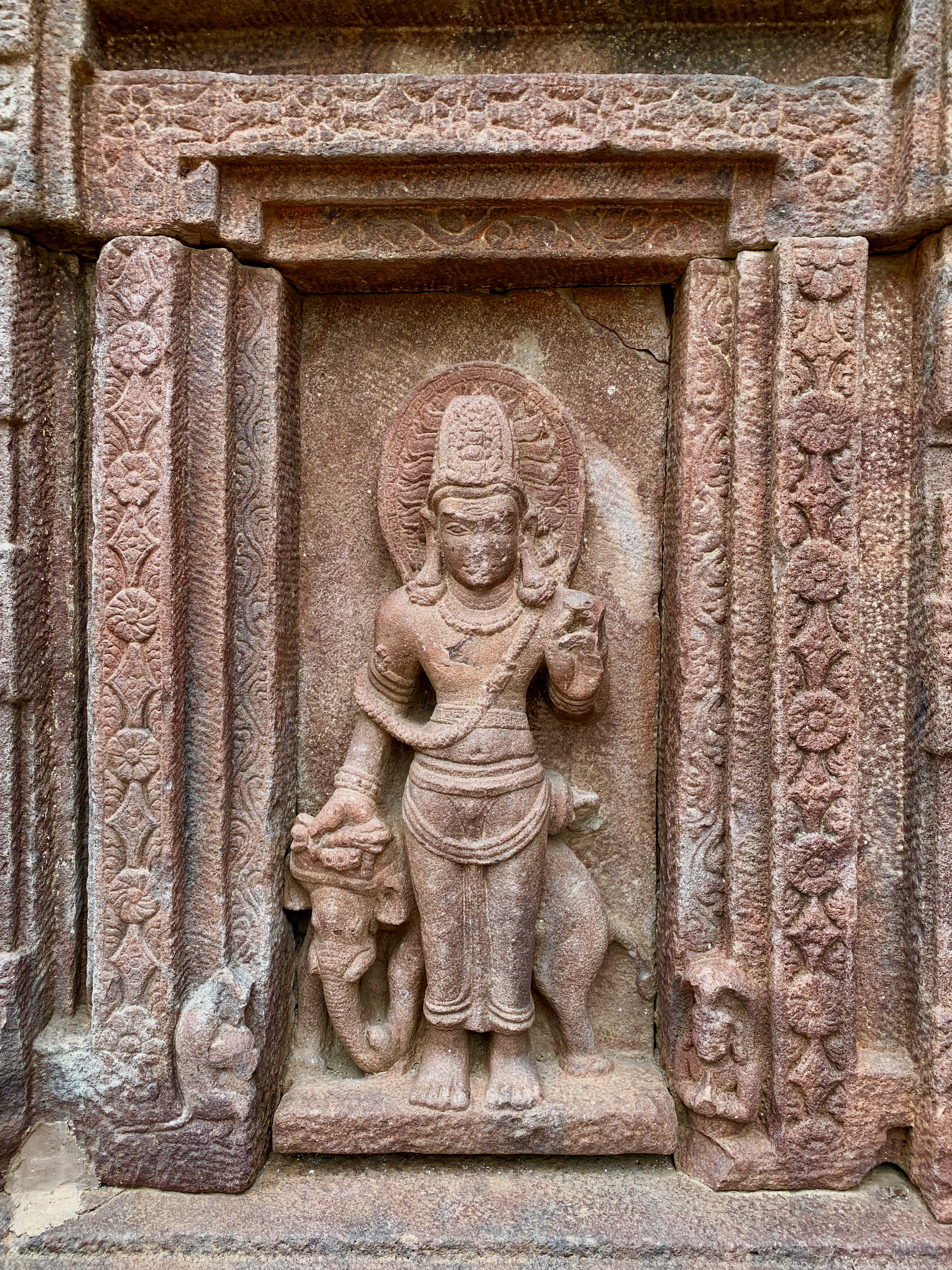
Outer walls include reliefs of Vedic and Puranic deities. Above: Indra.

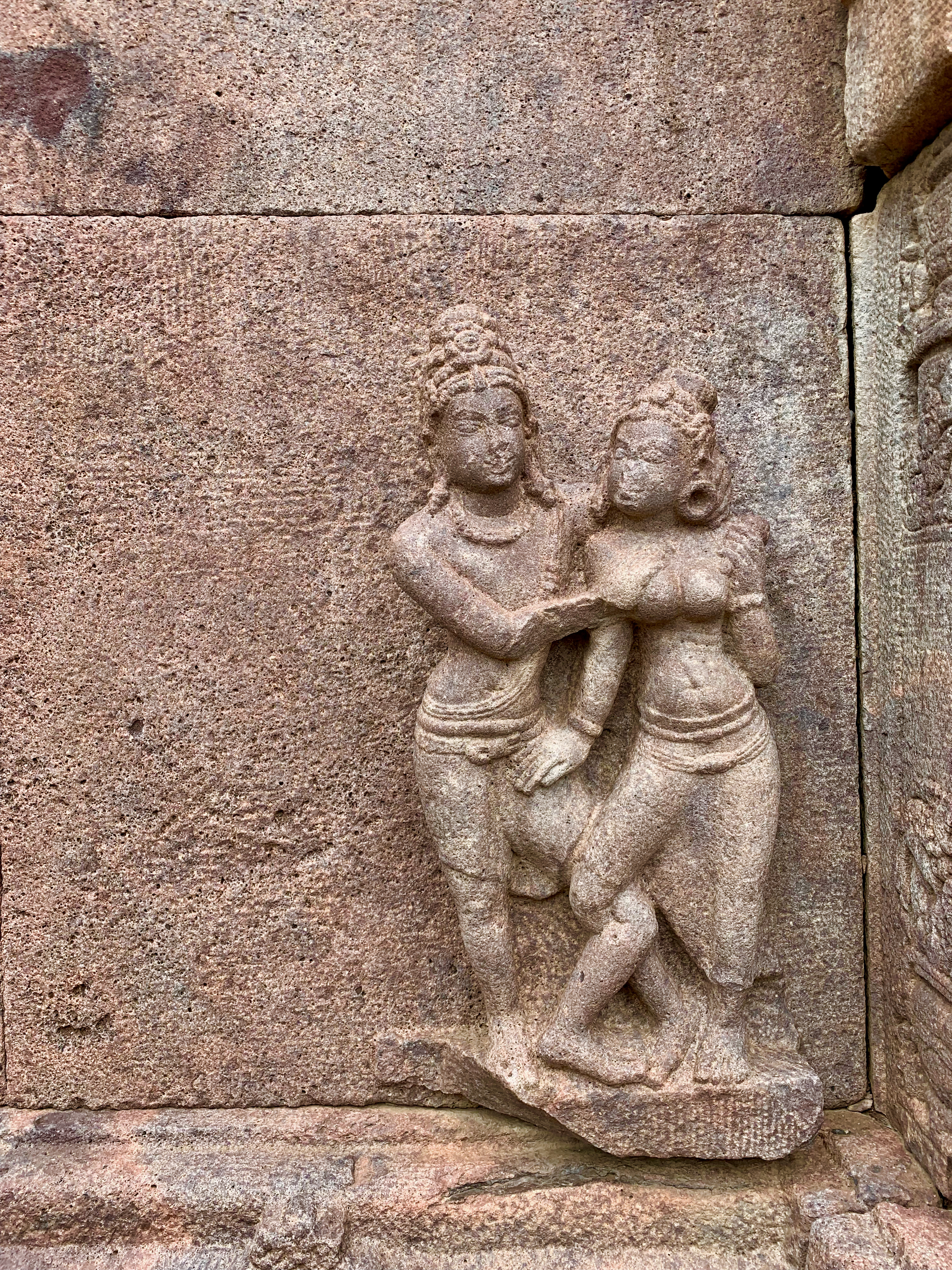
Amorous couple, kama scene on outer wall
- Padma Brahma is probably the last temple to be built in the group, one with an incomplete tower rather than a destroyed tower structure. It has no entrance porch, but displays the most complex pediment designs. Padma Brahma temple has a polished stone sculpture of Shivalinga.
- Bala Brahma: The Bala Brahma temple is likely the second oldest here, likely completed by about 650 CE. It has Sanskrit inscriptions in early Telugu script, one of which can be dated to 702 CE. The temple has Shaktism themes represented with the sculptures of Saptamatrikas (seven mothers). It is an active house of Hindu worship in contemporary times. Shivaratri is celebrated in this temple every year.
Bala Brahma temple
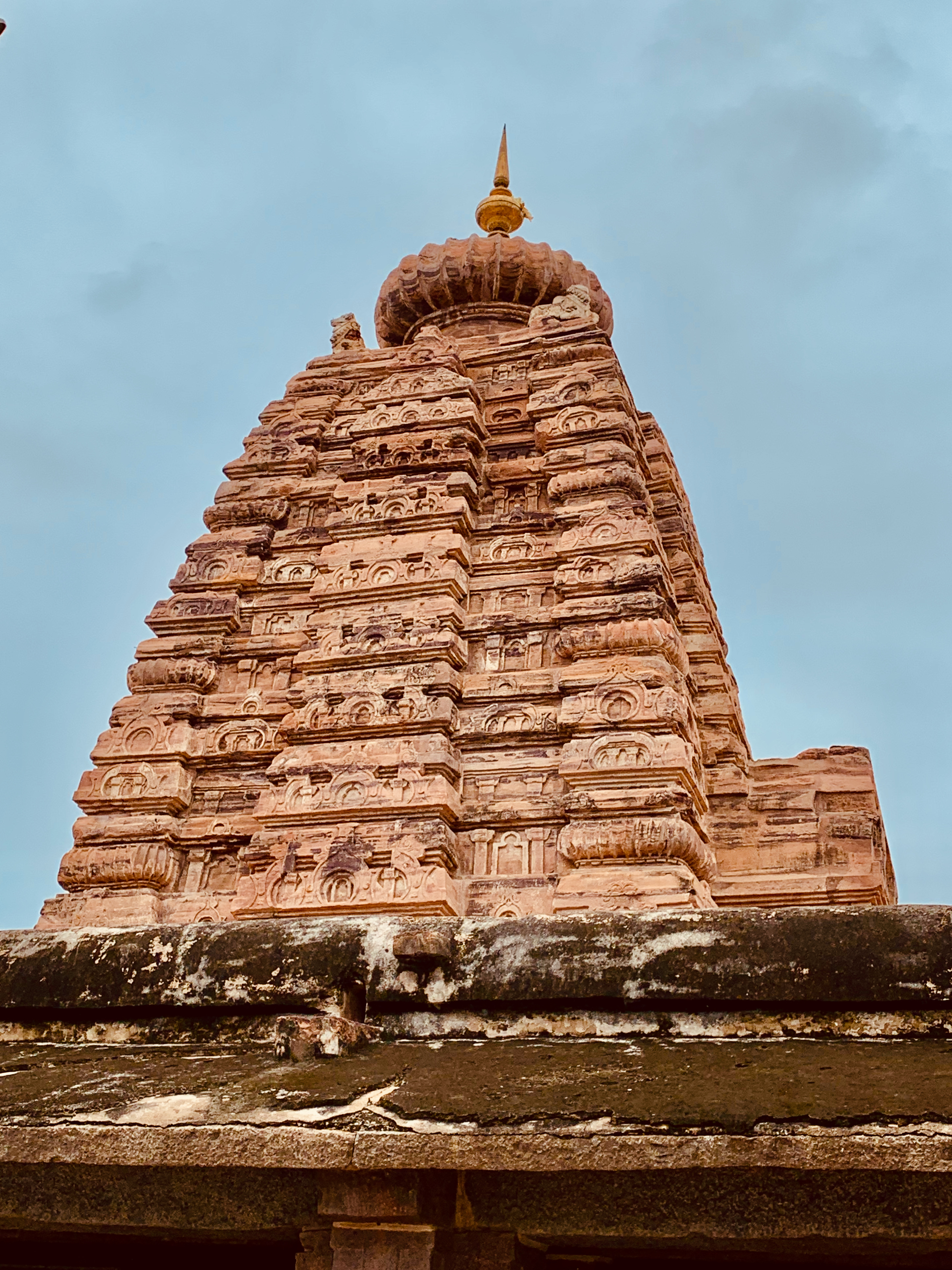
Nagara-style shikara

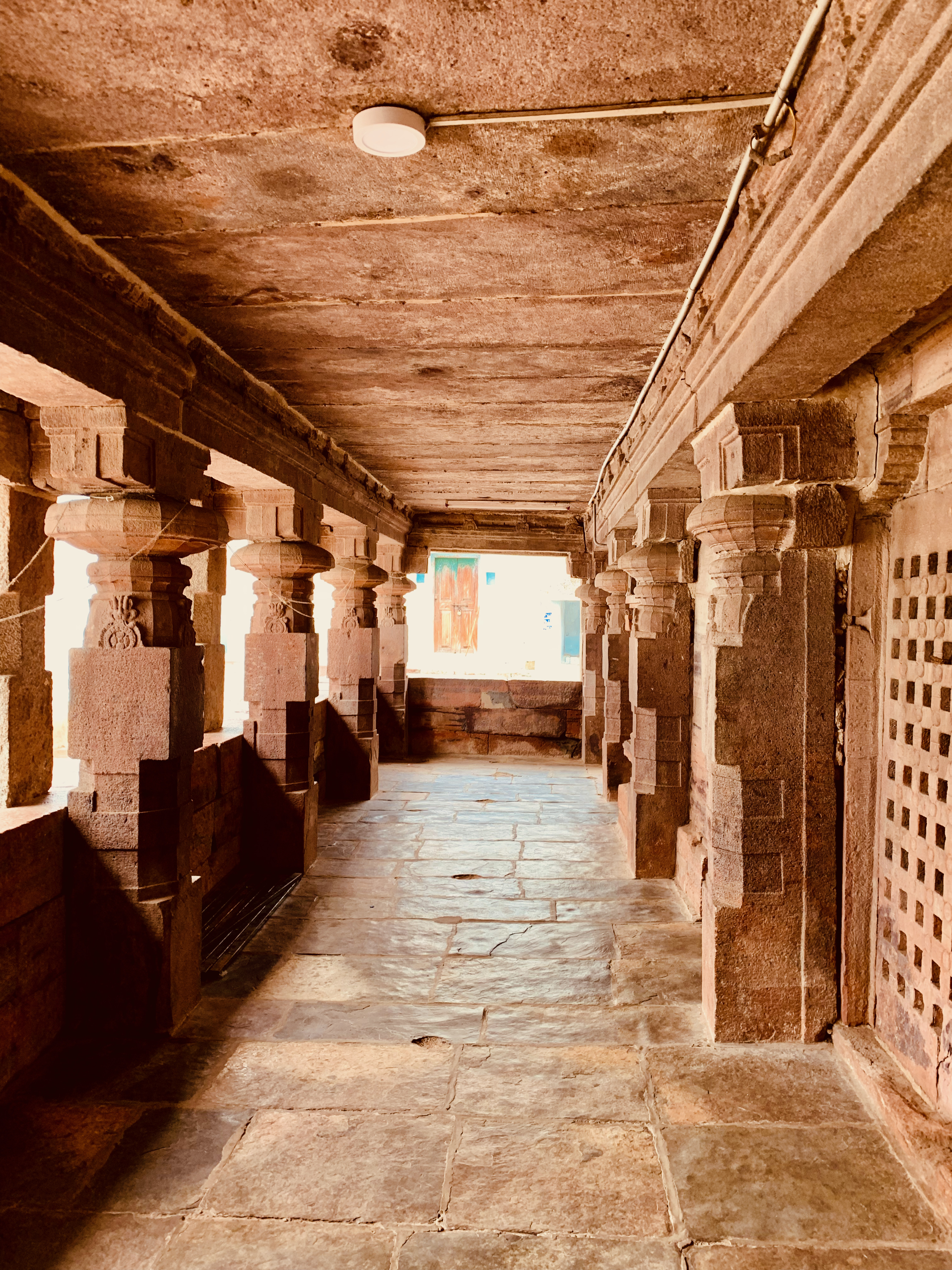
Outer covered hall

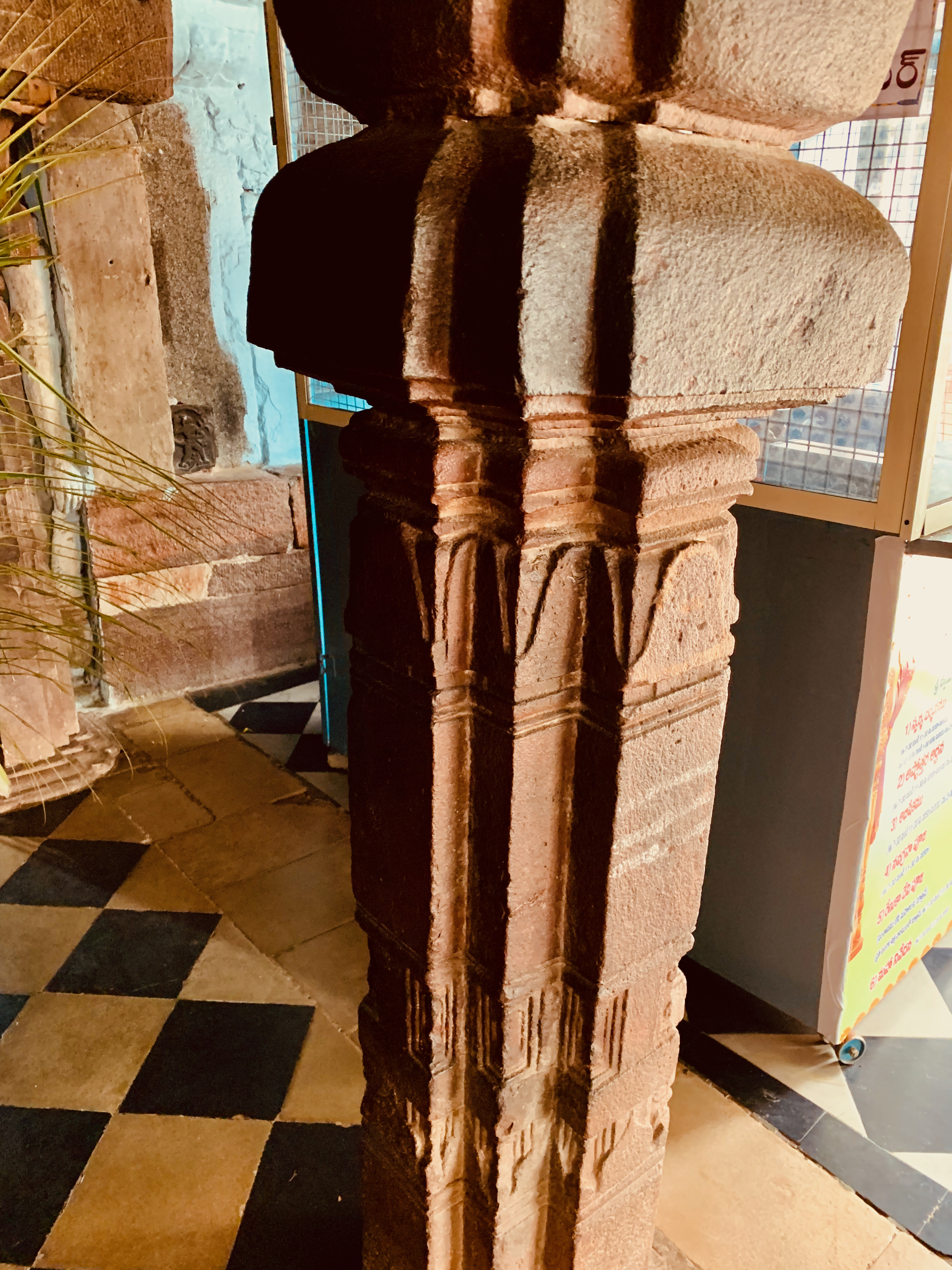
Mandapam with original pillar and modern era floor

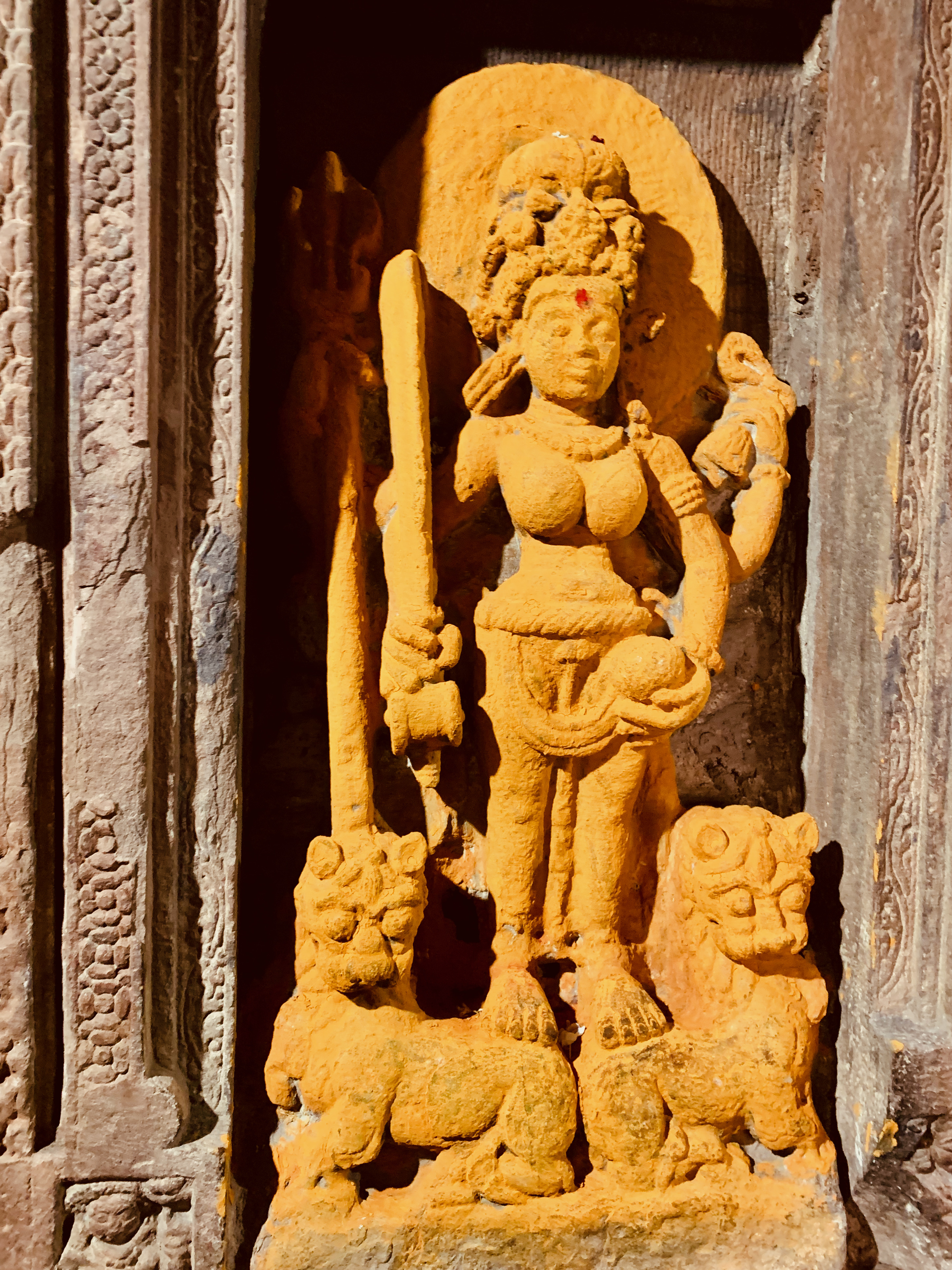
Durga on two lions, mid 7th-century
- Garuda Brahma has the same plan as the Vishwa Brahma temple, but it lacks the latter's intricate carving. It includes a flying Garuda, the vahana of Vishnu, suggestive of the likelihood that the temple once included a sculpture of Vishnu.
Garuda Brahma temple
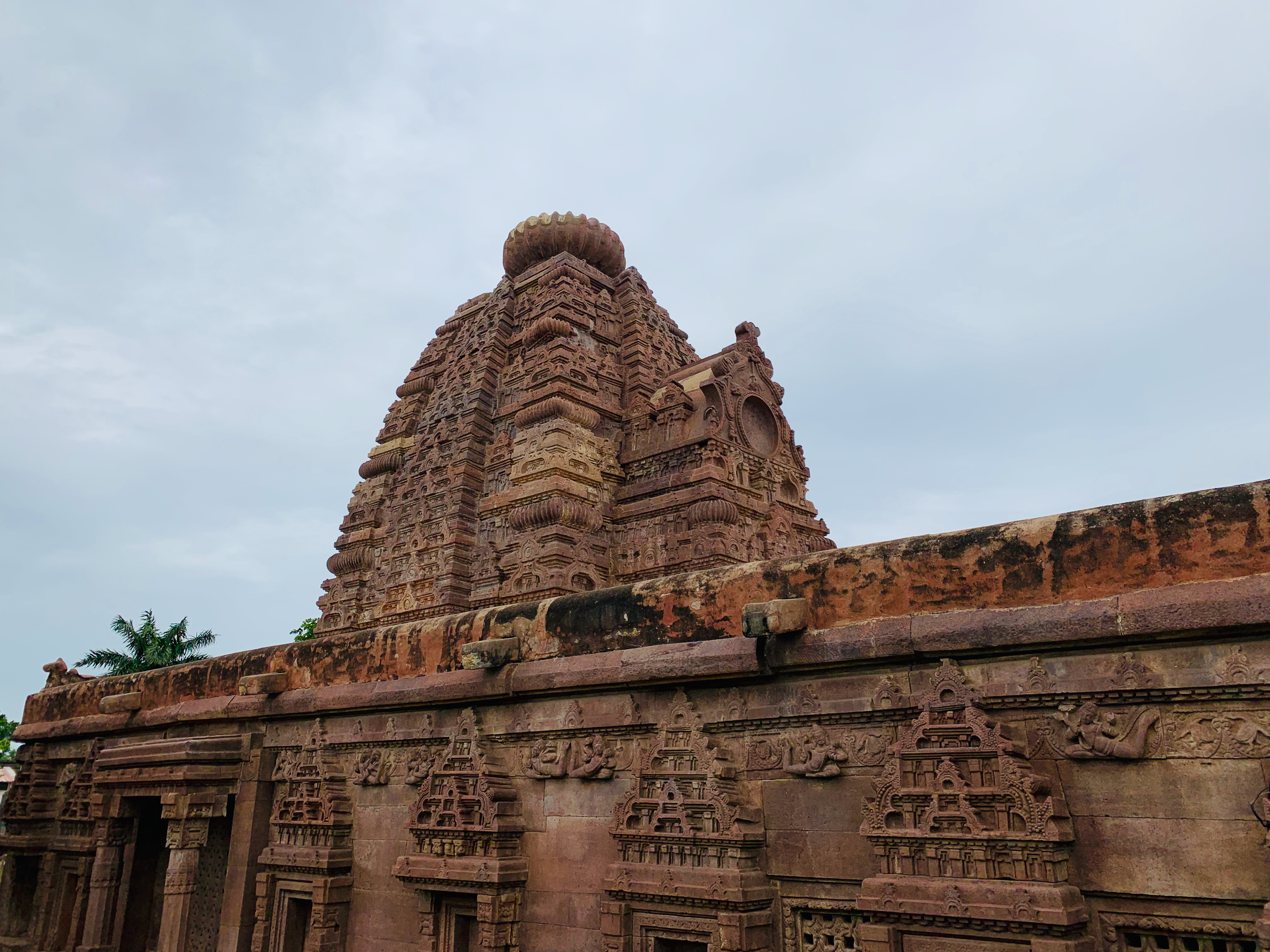
Temple overview

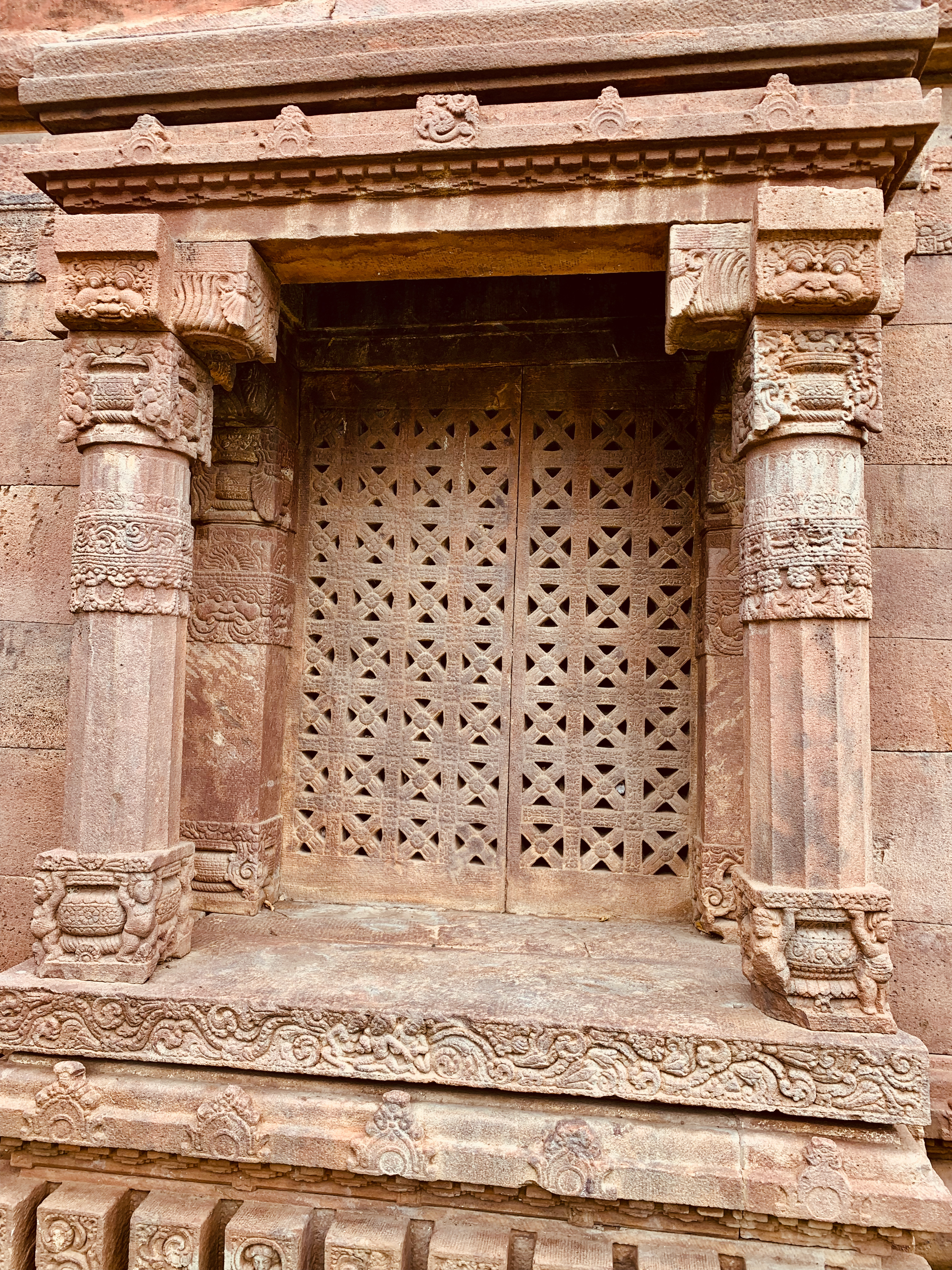
Stone mesh window

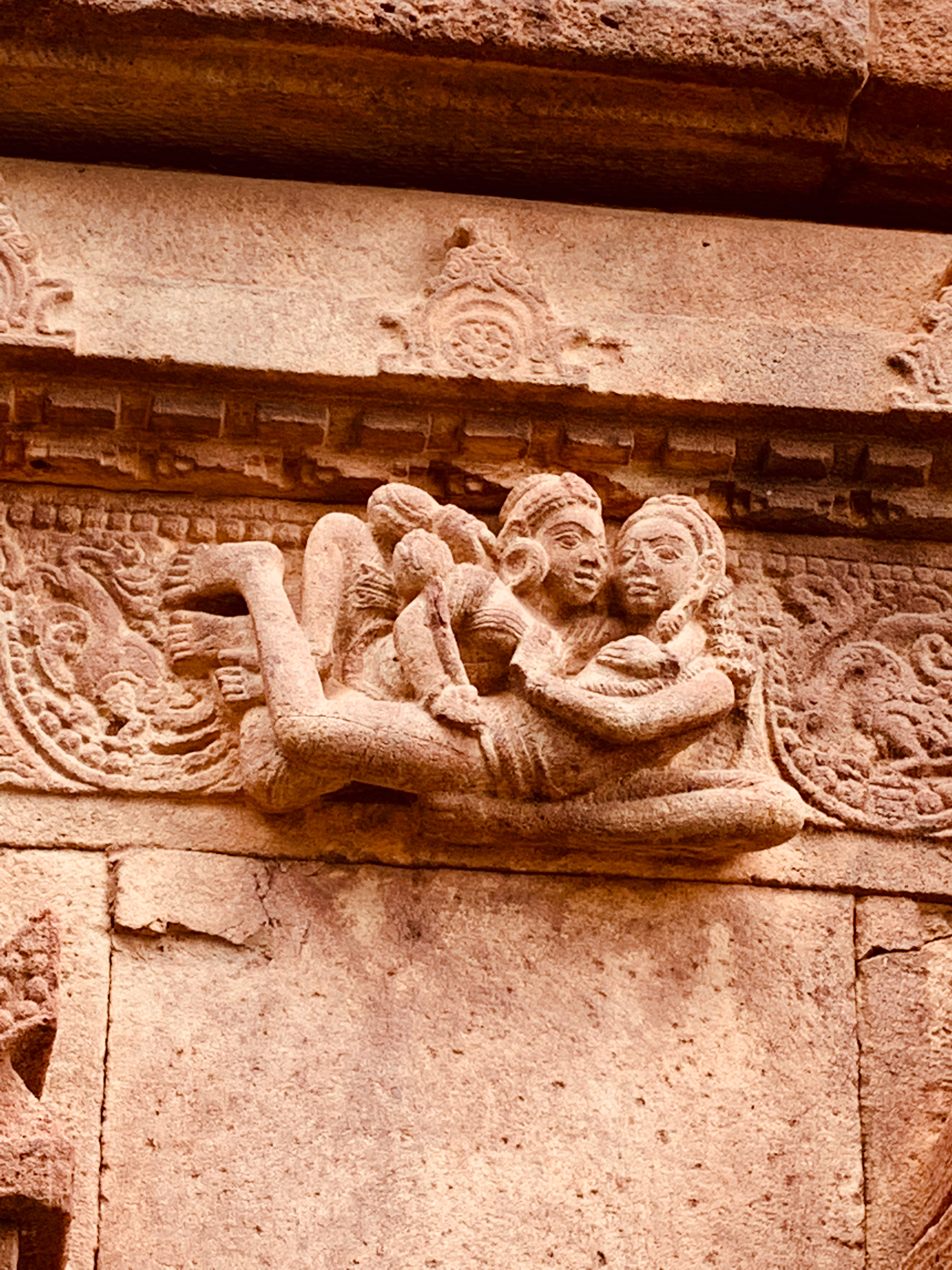
Gandharvas outer walls

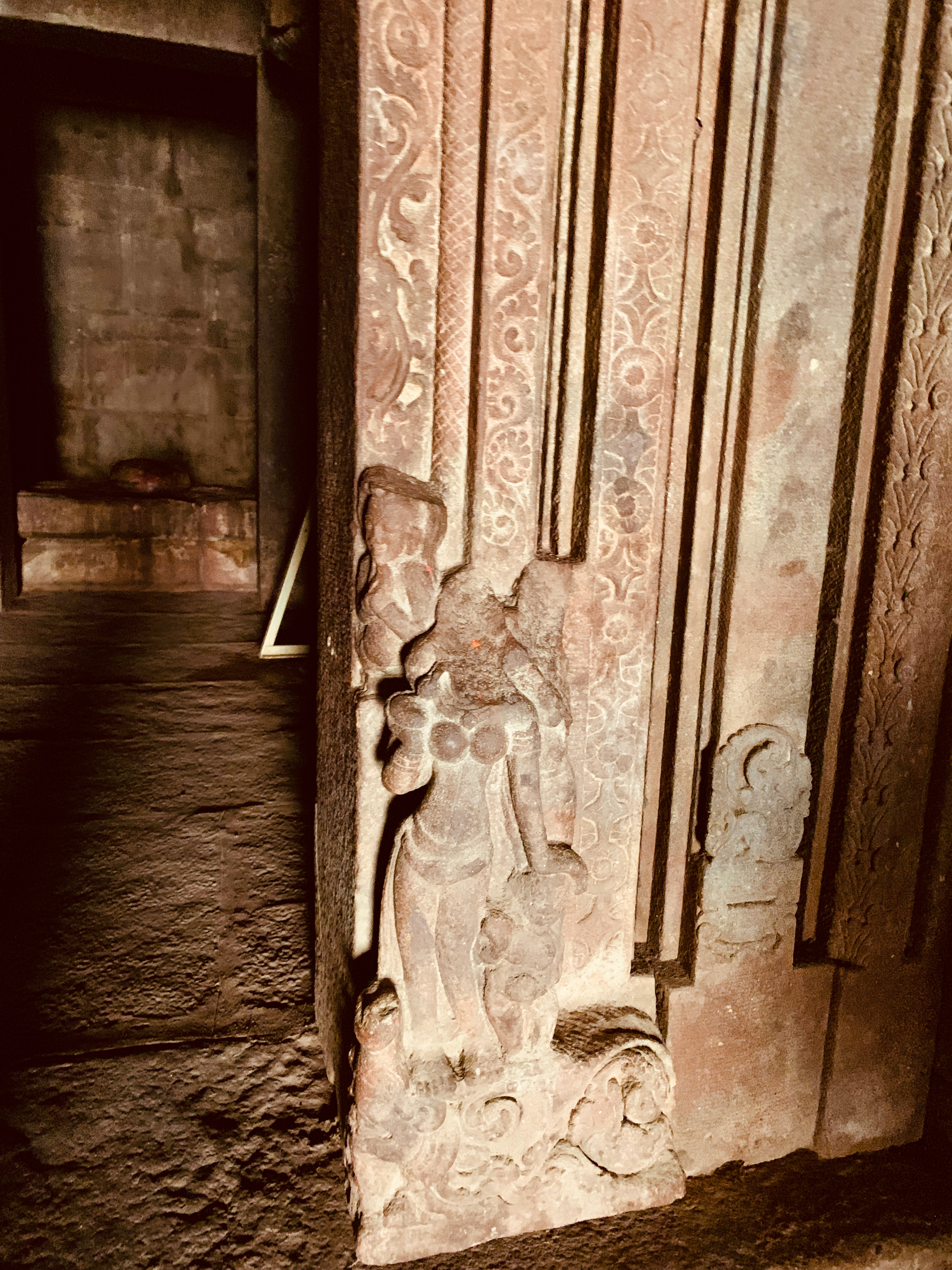
Defaced goddess Ganga, entrance
- Kumara Brahma is probably the earliest temple built, and like others stands on a jagati (platform). The outer walls provide a perforated screen to let natural light come into the circumambulation path. The pillars and beams in the ceiling are all carved with miniature figures and mayura (peacock) motifs. The tower is divided into venukosha, uccheda and madhyalata, with the Sikhara of tribhuni class of design. The pillars inside the mandapa have amorous couples in mithuna scenes. The sanctum doorway is flanked by Ganga and Yamuna goddesses, as well as two dvarapalas.
Kumara Brahma temple
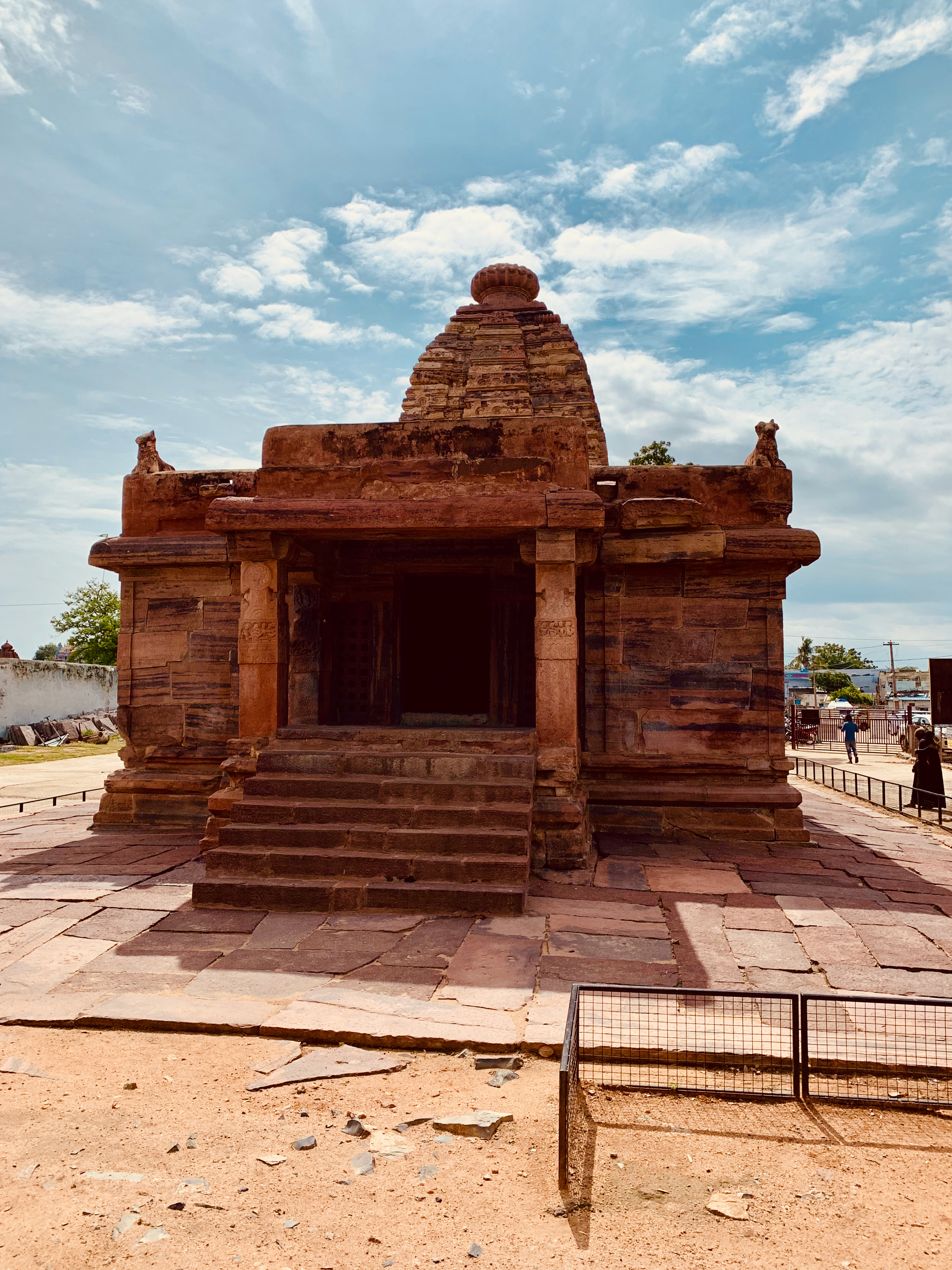
Temple overview

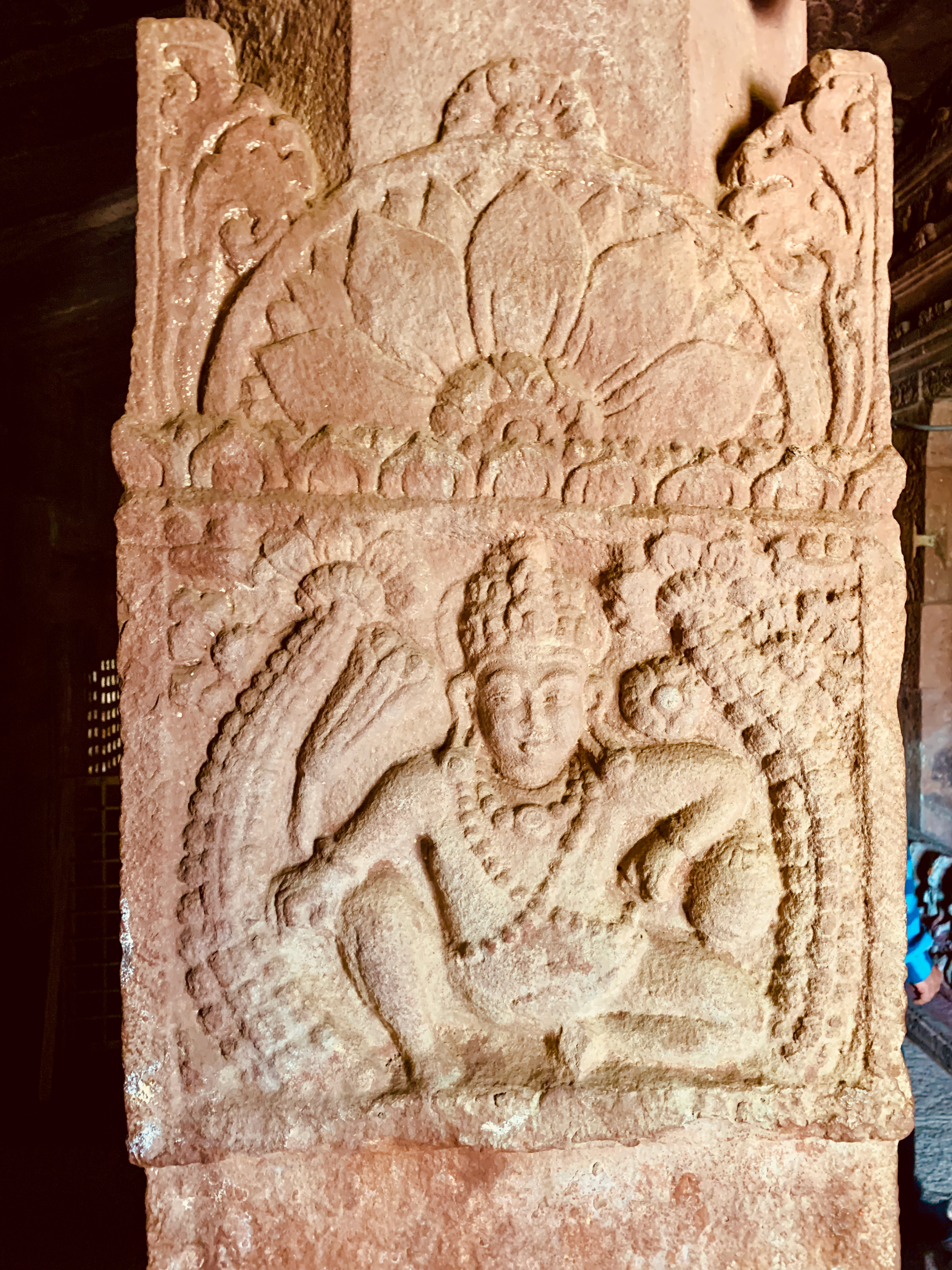
Pillar relief inside

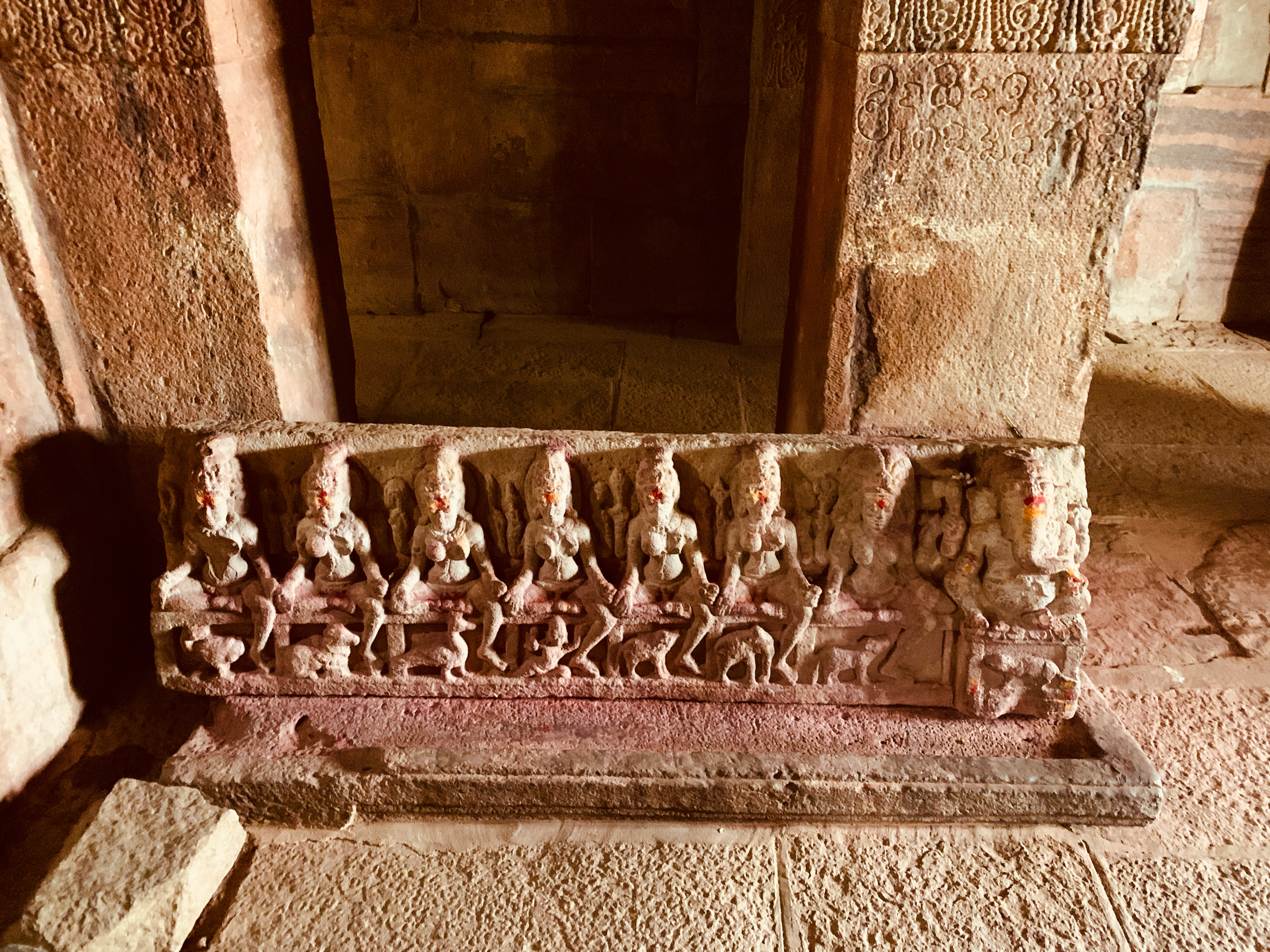
Saptamatrikas and Ganesha monolith, Inscription above them

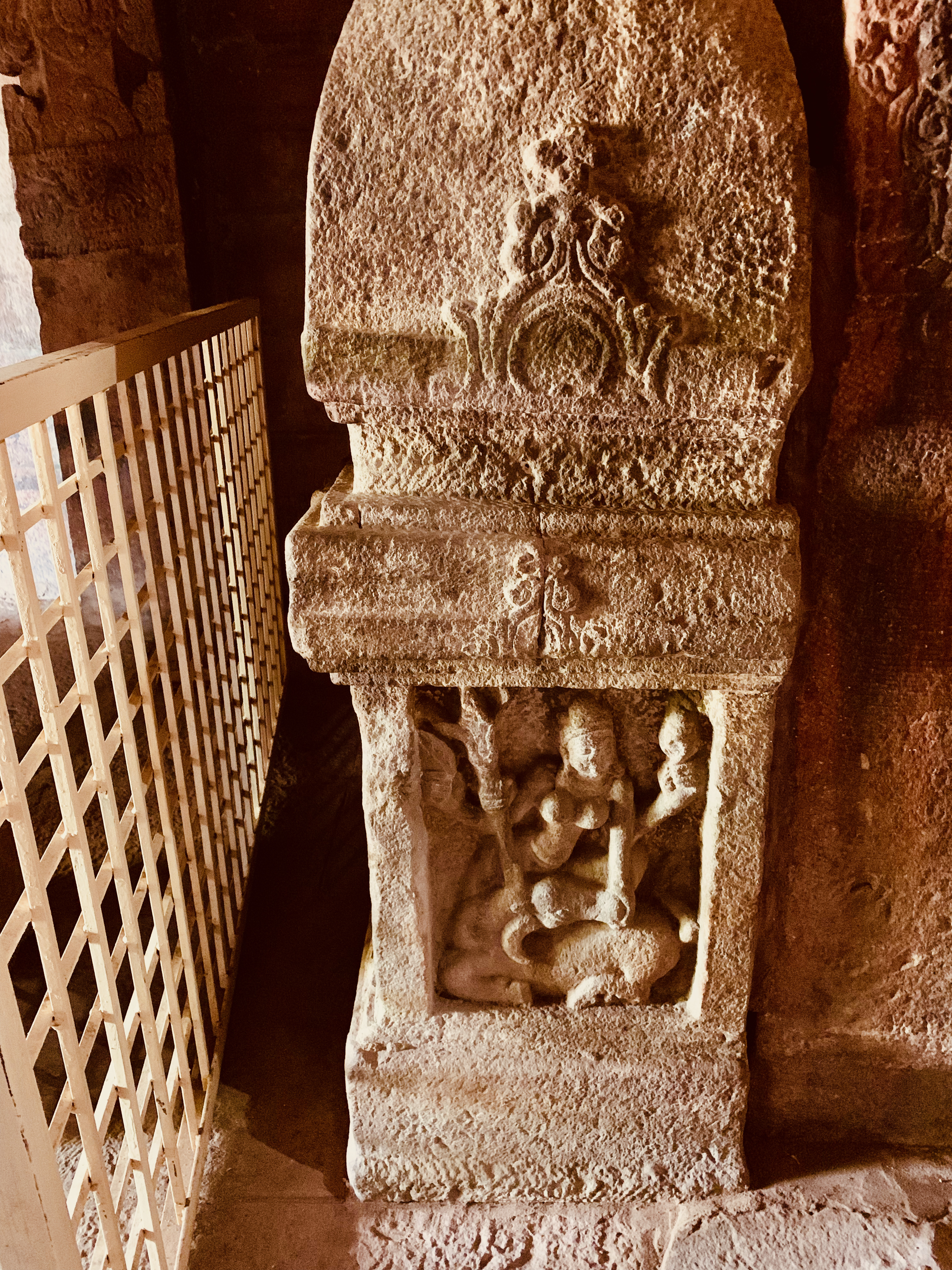
Mahisasuramardini

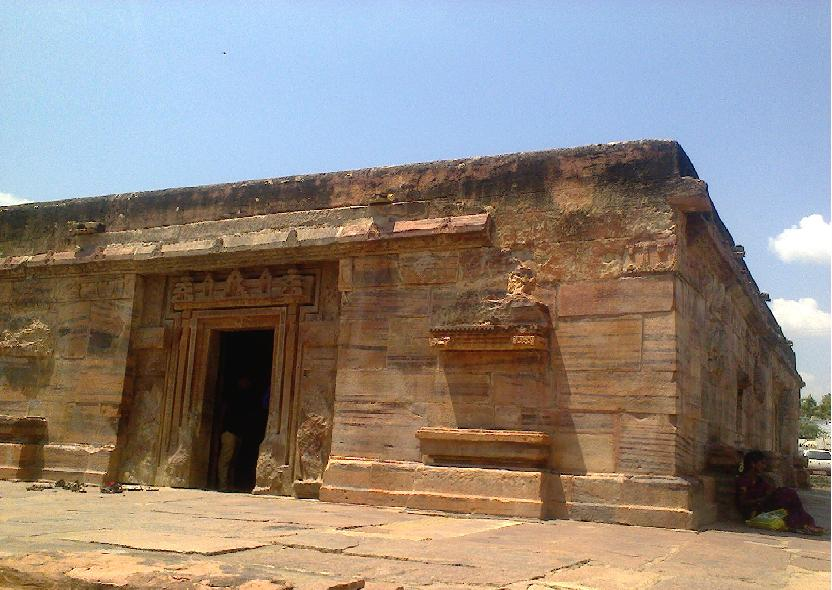
Arka Brahma temple is largely defaced and damaged.

- Arka Brahma temple is a mostly ruined temple. The temple art has been defaced, with only remnants of Ganga and Yamuna goddesses visible on the entrance of the sanctum. There is an inscription in the Siddhamatrika script which in most cases are likely the names of the artists who worked on specific sculpture (now missing), and these are in Kannada and Telugu languages.
- Veera Brahma Temple is a simpler, much damaged temple in the group. It has a gudha-mandapa, antarala and a garbhagriya. The outer walls of the temple are sectioned by pairs of pilasters into projecting niches but the artwork in these have not survived. The tower above the sanctum has projections in its center.
- Vishva Brahma temple is the northmost and an intricately carved temple with its niches and windows featuring complex designs around them. The foundational platform is also carved with musicians, dancers, foliage, birds, geese and ganas. The temple pillars inside the mandapa have fluted shafts above seated lions, while the capital is ribbed kalasha shaped. The temple also has sculptural scenes from the Hindu epics as well as the Panchatantra.
Vishwa Brahma temple
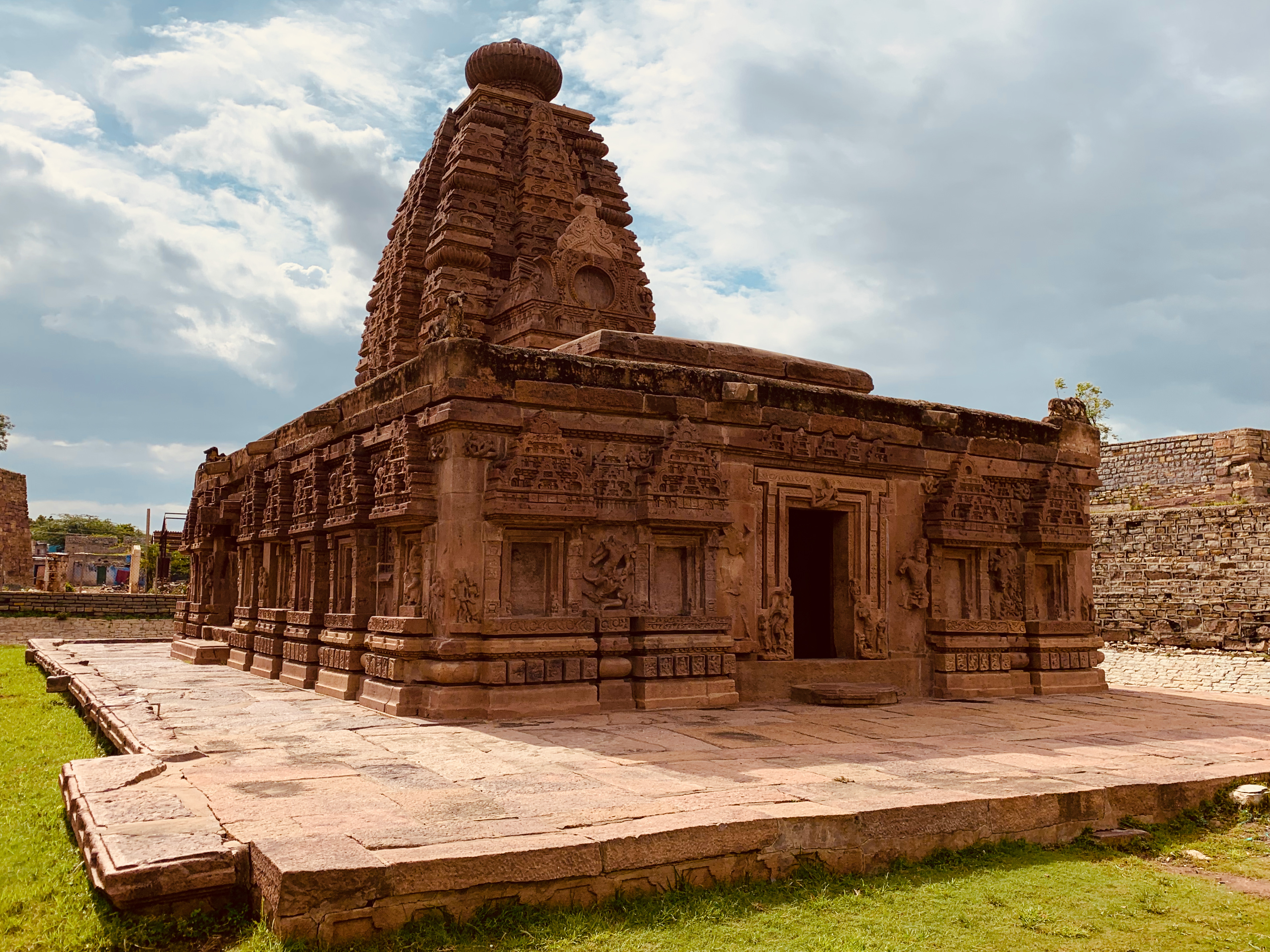
Temple overview

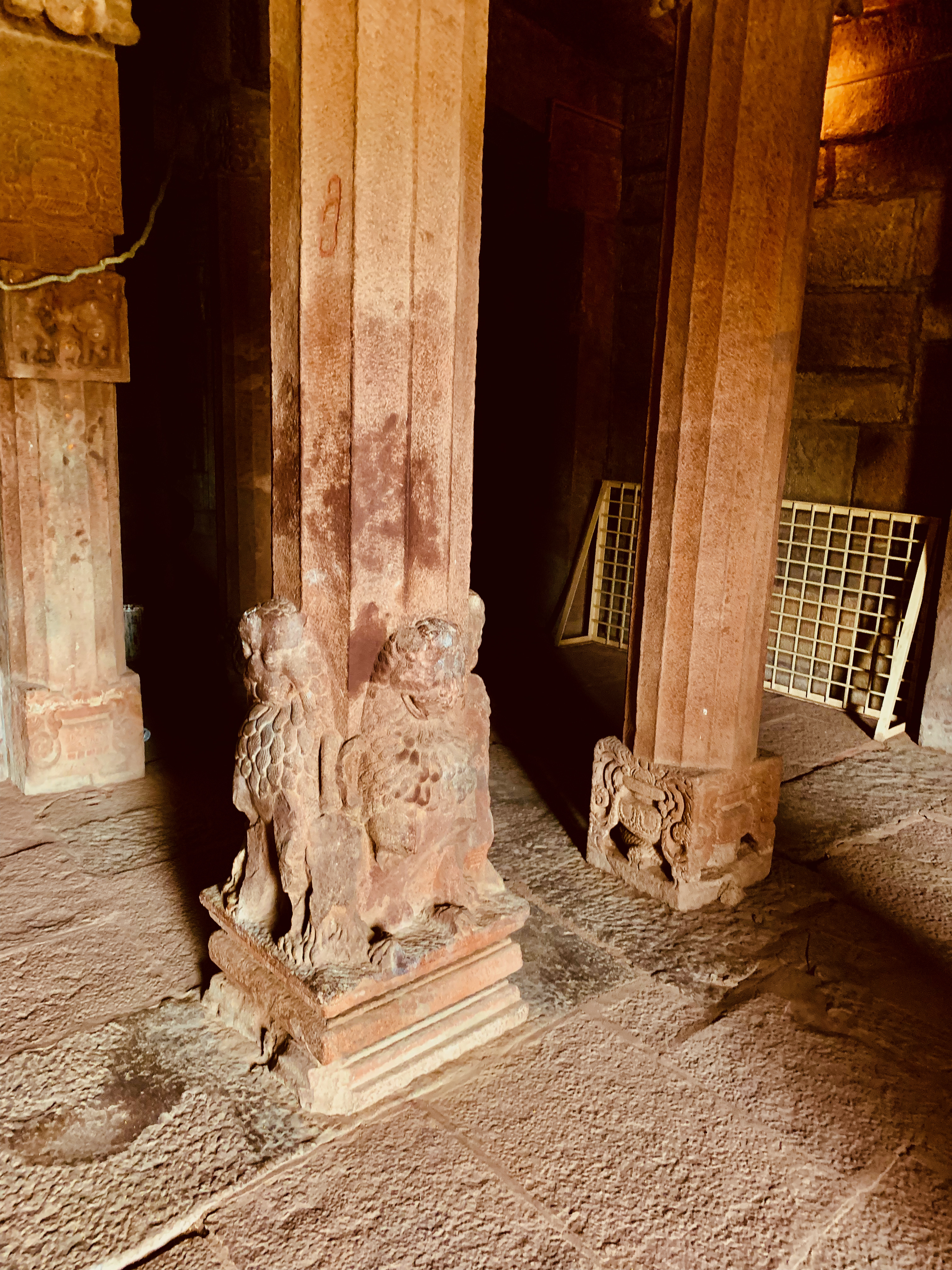
Pillar carvings inside

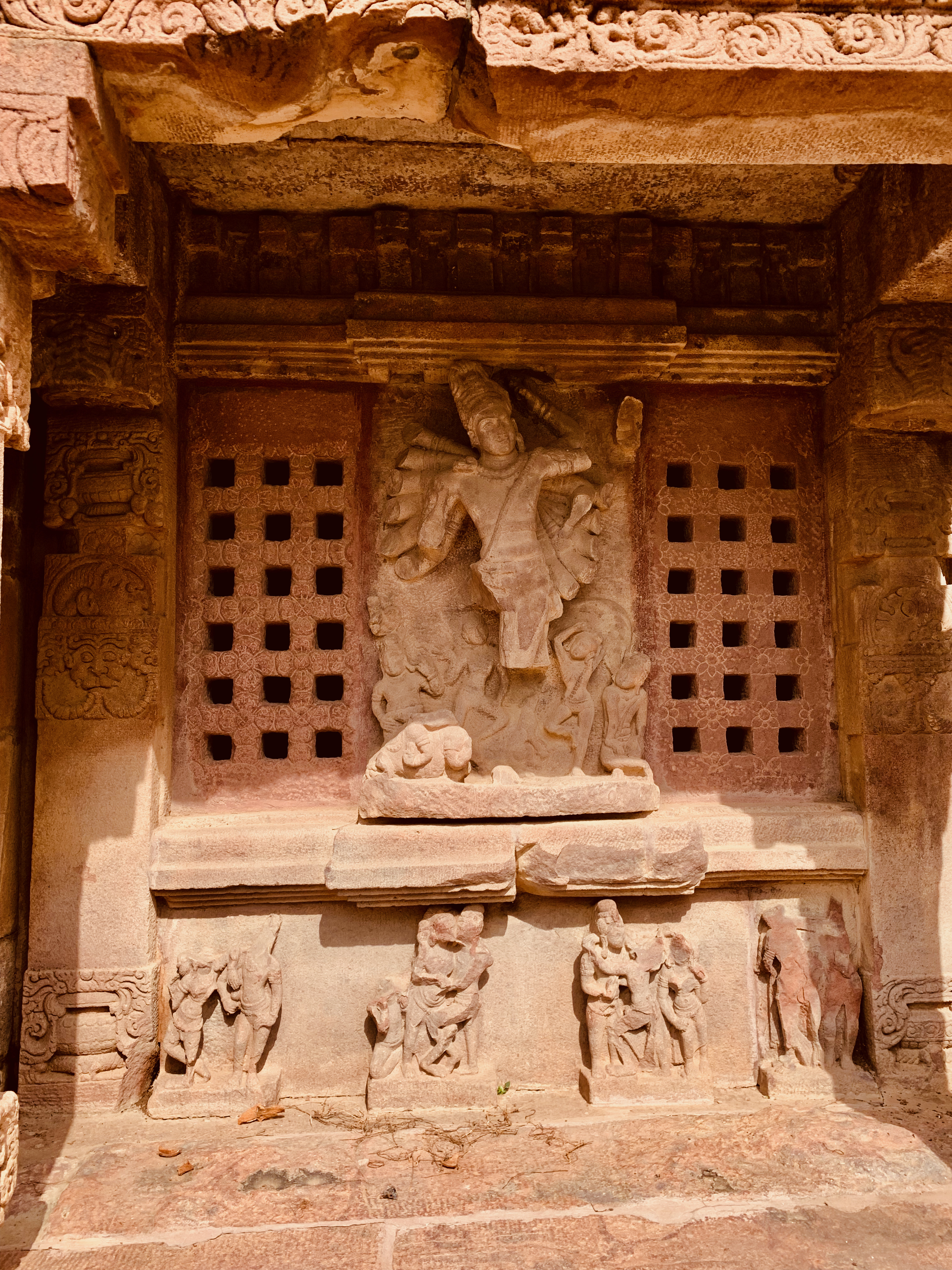
Gangadhara in the west portico outside

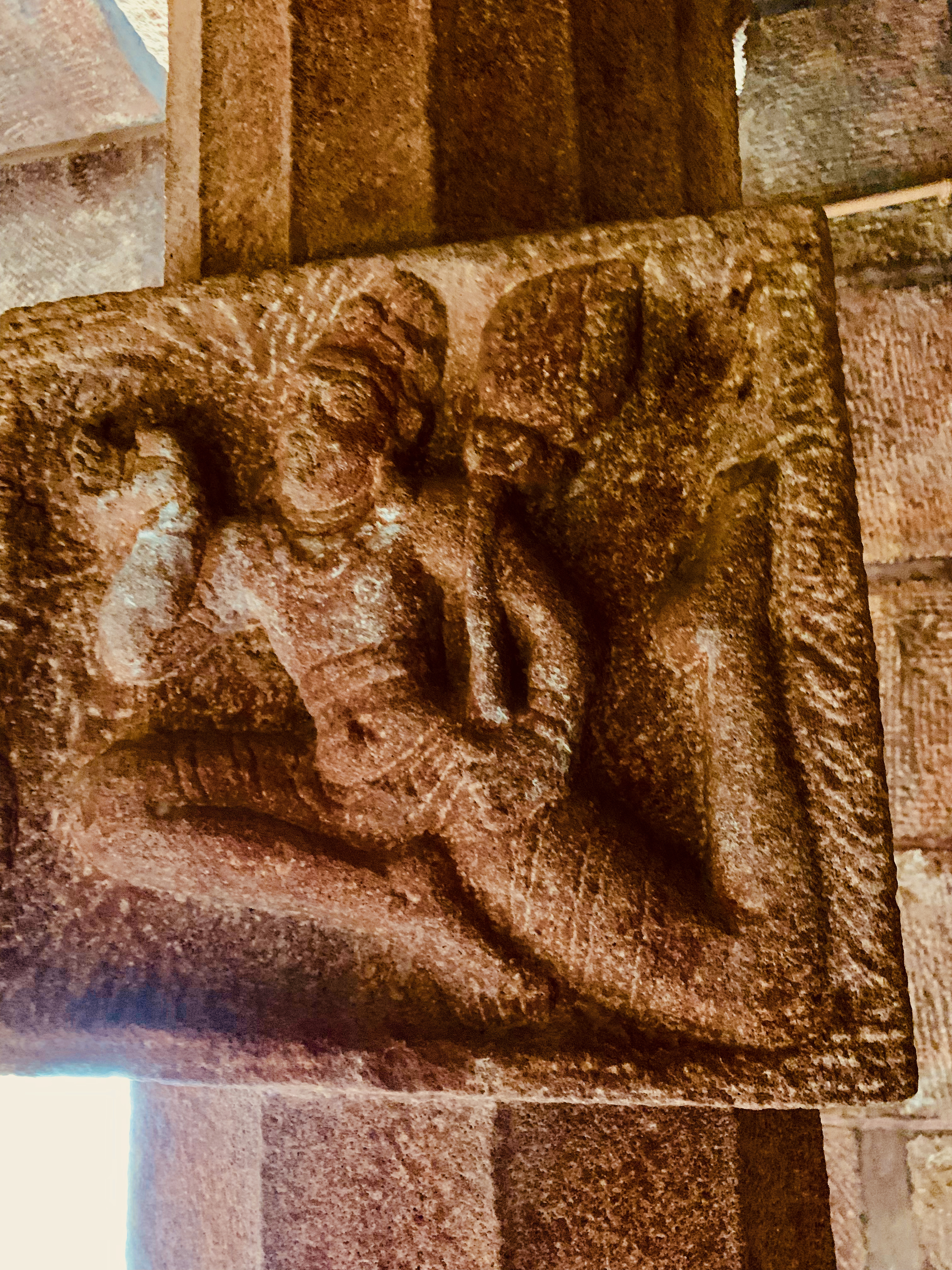
Hanuman and the Ramayana legend

There is an ASI museum near this group of temples. It shows ruins recovered at the site, with remnants of a Durga in Mhishasura-mardini form, a Lajja-Gauri, a Nataraja Shiva which George Michell calls a "masterpiece of refined sculpture", a polished Nandi statue with Shiva and Parvati riding it. The museum also has ruins of reliefs that narrate Hindu epics and other texts such as the Panchatantra.

=== ASI protection and relocation ===
The Alampuram temples are listed as an archaeological and architectural treasure on the official "List of Monuments" prepared by the Archaeological Survey of India under The Ancient Monuments and Archaeological Sites and Remains Act. Some temples at the Alampur site came under submergence due to the building of Sri Sailam Hydro-electric Project, the threatened ancient and medieval era monuments along with the Sangameswara temple were relocated to a higher place, west and southwest of the Navabrahma temples. The latter was transplanted near the Alampur Papanasi Temples.

== Nearby temples ==
Alampur was an important pilgrimage site for the Hindus well after the 8th century as evidenced by the inscriptions and nearby major complex of temples. The Papanasam group of Hindu temples built in the 9th and 10th centuries are about 1.5 kilometres (0.93 mi) southwest from the Navabrahma temple site. There are other temples like Suryanarayana temple dating back to 9th century. The Narasimha temple has inscriptions from the Sri Krishna Devaraya (Vijayanagar Empire) era.

== See also ==
- Alampuram Museum
- Alampuram Papanasi Temples
- Aihole
- Pattadakal
