= Alampuram (Hemalapuram) =

Alampuram Hemalapuram/Hemalapuri
- Town
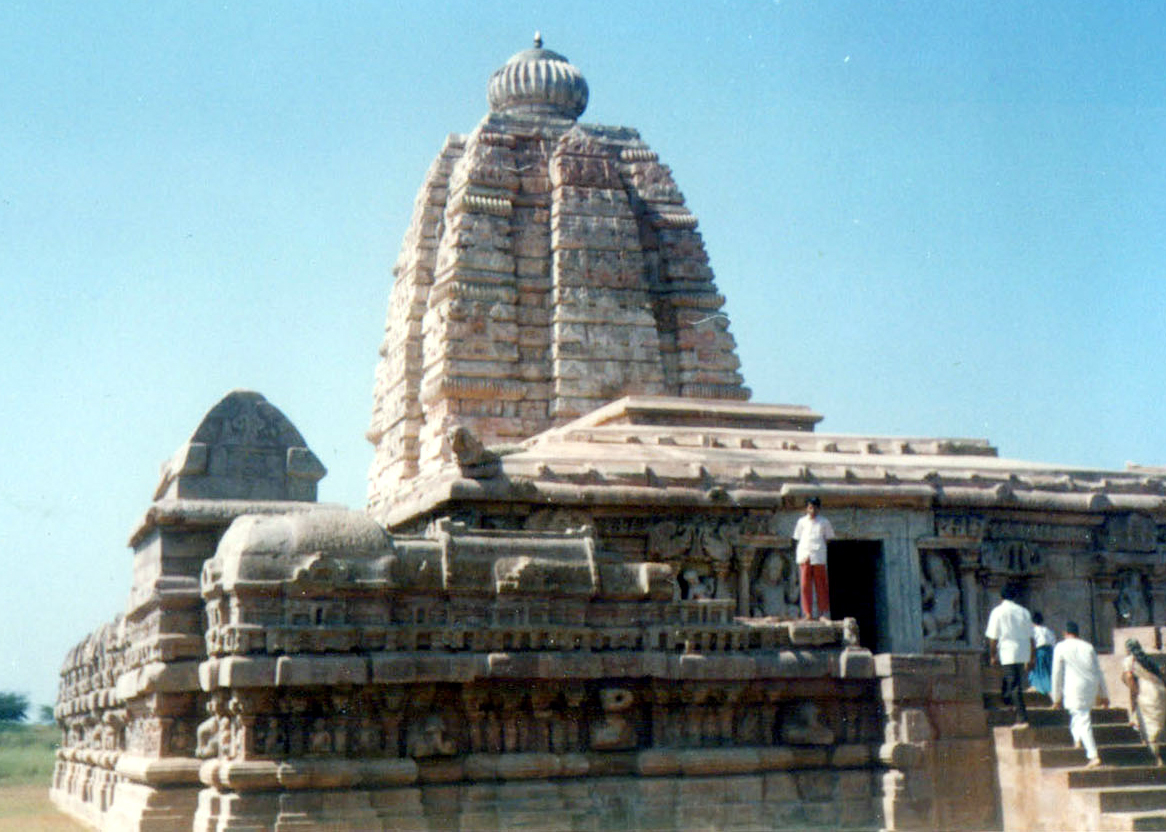
- Sangameshwara Temple, Alampuram

- Location in Telangana, India Alampuram (India)
- Coordinates: 15.878°N 78.132°E
- Country: India
- State: Telangana
- District: Jogulamba Gadwal

Government
  - Type: Municipality
  - Body: Alampur Municipality

Area
  - Total: 41.3 km^{2} (15.9 sq mi)
- Elevation: 269 m (883 ft)

Population (2011)
  - Total: 12,609
  - Density: 305/km^{2} (791/sq mi)

Languages
  - Official: Telugu
- Time zone: UTC+5:30 (IST)
- Postal code: 509153
- Website: telangana.gov.in

Alampuram (Hemalapuram) is a town situated in Jogulamba Gadwal district in the Indian state of Telangana. Alampur is a popular Hindu pilgrimage site in Shaktism and is also home to the Navabrahma Temples, a group of nine temples dedicated to Shiva built in the seventh and eighth century CE. It is near to the confluence of the rivers Tungabhadra and Krishna and is referred to as Dakshina Kasi and is also considered the western gateway to Srisailam (Srisaila Paschima Dwaram). The sacredness of Alampur is mentioned in the Skanda Purana. It is surrounded by the Nallamala hills and is situated on the left bank of the Tungabhadra River. Alampur was ruled by badami chalukyas they built 9 cluster of shiva temples. After them rashtrakutas of manyakheta and western chalukyas of karnataka built papanasi temples. Alampur is home to multiple Telugu and old Kannada inscriptions .Alampur contains numerous Hindu temples, the prominent ones being Jogulamba temple, Navabrahma temples, Papanasi temples, and Sangameswara Temple.

Jogulamba temple is one of the eighteen Maha Shakta pithas, which are the most significant shrines and pilgrimage destinations in Shaktism. The Navabrahma Temples are nine temples dedicated to Shiva built in the seventh and eighth century CE by the Badami Chalukyas. The Navabrahma temples are listed as an archaeological and architectural treasure on the official "List of Monuments" prepared by the Archaeological Survey of India. Papanasi temples are a group of twenty three Hindu temples dated between 9th- and 11th-century located in Papanasi village, 2.5 km (1.6 mi) to the south-west of Alampur. Papanasi temples are close to the Navabrahma Temples of the Shaivism tradition, but were constructed a few centuries later by the Rashtrakutas and Western Chalukyas.

== History ==
Alampur was under the rule of Satavahanas, Ikshvakus of Nagarjunakonda, Badami Chalukyas, Rashtrakutas, Kalyani Chalukyas, Kakatiyas, Vijayanagara Empire, and the Qutb Shahis of Golconda. Alampur was previously known as Halampuram, Hemalapuram and Alampuram. Under the name Hatampura, it was mentioned in an inscription dated to 1101 CE in the reign of Western Chalukya king Vikramaditya VI.

== Temples ==
The Alampuram Navabhrama Temples are historically important and reflect remarkable architectural skills. The Alampuram temples are listed as an archaeological and architectural treasure on the official "List of Monuments" prepared by the Archaeological Survey of India under The Ancient Monuments and Archaeological Sites and Remains Act. Since the original area of the temples at Alampur became submerged by the Sri Sailam Hydro-electric Project, the temples were relocated to higher ground. The uniqueness of this group of temples lies in their plan and design in the northern architectural style introduced by the Chalukyas of Badami between 650 and 750 CE.

=== Jogulamba Temple ===
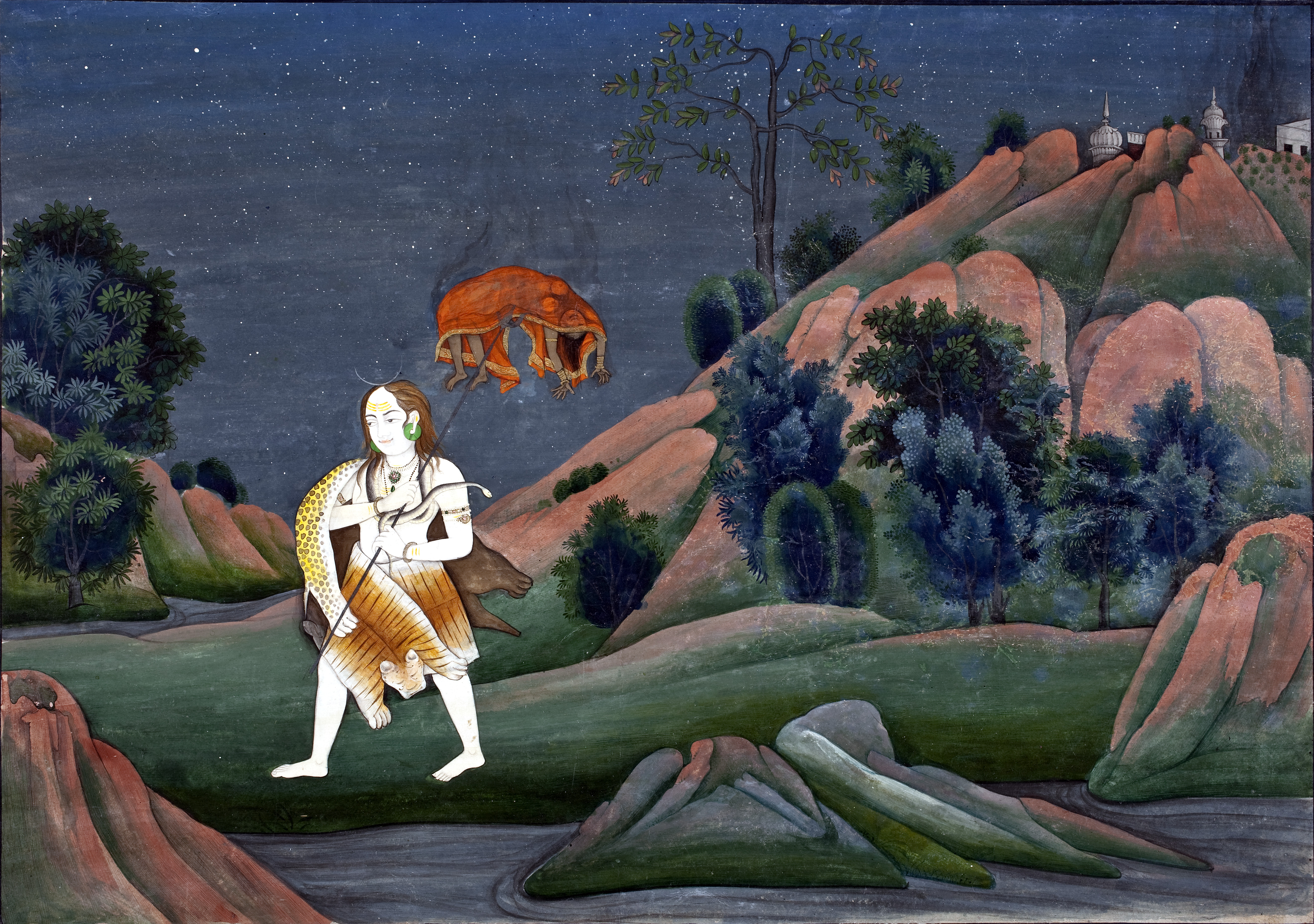
Shiva carrying the corpse of Sati Devi

The Jogulamba temple is regarded as a Shakta pitha where Sati Devi's upper teeth fell. The history of Daksha yagna and Sati's self-immolation is the origin story of Shakta pithas. The original temple was grounded by Muslim invaders in 1390 CE. The temple was rebuilt after 615 years.

Shakta pithas are shrines which are the most divine seats of the Mother Goddess. The body parts of the corpse of Sati Devi had fallen in these places, when Lord Shiva carried it and wandered throughout Aryavartha in sorrow.

=== Navabrahma Temples ===
Navabrahma Temples include nine temples dedicated to Shiva. These temples date to 7th to 8th century CE and were built by the Badami Chalukyas rulers who were patrons of art and architecture. The sacredness of Alampur Temple is mentioned in the Skanda Purana. It is mentioned that Brahma performed a strict penance here for Lord Siva. Lord Siva appeared before him and blessed him with the powers of creation. Therefore, the name Brahmeswara.

=== Papanasi Temples ===
Papanasi temples are a group of twenty three Hindu temples dated between 9th- and 11th-century located in Papanasi village, 2.5 km (1.6 mi) to the south-west of Alampuram. Papanasi temples are close to the Navabrahma Temples of the Shaivism tradition, but were constructed a few centuries later by the Rashtrakutas and Western Chalukyas. The Papanasi temples exhibit the Nagara architecture with a square plan. Together with the Navabrahma temples, the Papanasi group were related to the Kalamukha and Pashupata sect of Shaivism.

=== Kudavelly Sangameswara Temple ===
Kudavelly Sangameswara is derived from the word Sangam meaning confluence of two or more rivers. Hence the temple is also known as Kudavelly Sangameswara Temple. On the basis of a label inscription found in the temple, the temple is dated to pre-Pulakesin-II (r. 610-642 CE) time period and is the oldest of all the Chalukyan temples at Alampur. The Kudavelly Sangameswara temple was originally located at the meeting point of Tungabhadra and Krishna river, 20 km (12 mi) north east from the current site at Kudavelly village . It was shifted to Alampur in 1979 when the original site got submerged due to the construction of Srisailam dam.

Kudavelly Family residing in the Kudavelly Village has immensely helped the Archaeological Survey of India (ASI) in shifting the temple to Alampur. ASI documented the temple design, dismantled it block by block, moved the material to outskirts of Alampur and assembled it and restored it to its original form ^{[20]}. Kudavelly Family has contributed for the renovation of Kudavelly Sangameswara Temple, one such inscription stone is found near the Temple premises describing the contribution in 1958 ( Vilambi Telugu Year ).

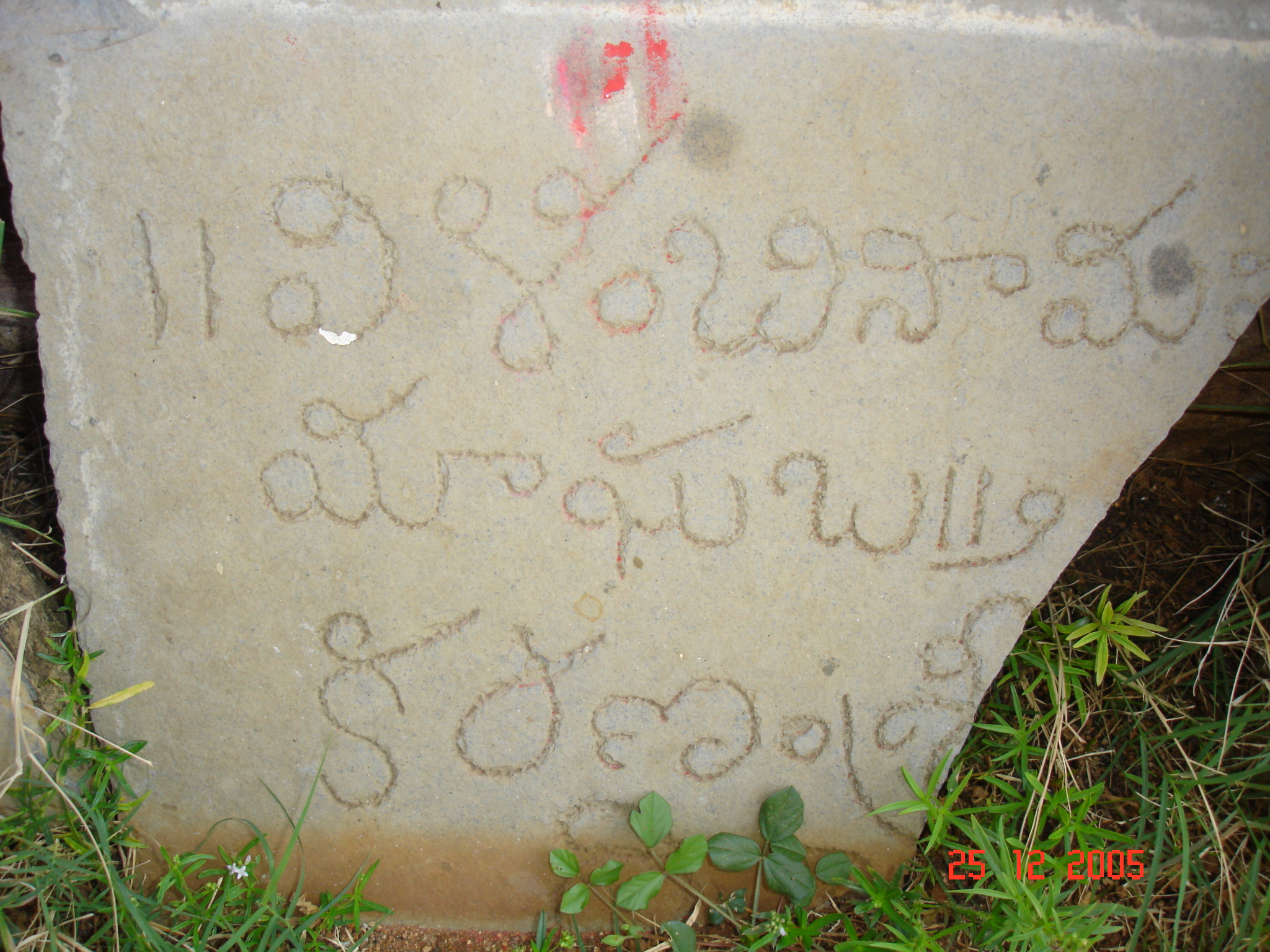
Inscription Stone describing the contribution by Kudavelly Srinivas Rao for Sangameshwara Temple Renovation

== Archaeology Museum ==
An archaeology museum is situated at the entrance of the Bala Brahma Temple complex. It houses a collection of sculptures and inscriptions recovered from the Navabrahma temples and surroundings of Alampur.

== Demographics ==
The population in 1901 was 30,222, compared with the 27,271 in 1891. Alampur, the headquarters, had a population of 4,182. According to The Imperial Gazetteer of India, Alampur was a taluk of Raichur district, Hyderabad State. It has an area of 480 square kilometres (190 sq mi) in 43 villages.

As of 2001 India census, Alampur had a population of 9350. Males constitute 54% of the population and females 46%. Alampur has an average literacy rate of 61%, higher than the national average of 59.5%; with 64% of the males and 36% of females literate. 16% of the population is under 6 years of age.

== Politics ==
Alampur comes under Alampur Assembly constituency which falls under Nagarkurnool Lok Sabha constituency.

== Geography ==
The Krishna River separates the taluk from Mahbubnagar district on the North and the Tungabhadra from Karnataka state. The confluence of these two rivers is situated in the extreme east of the taluk, formerly at Kudavelly Village. The village was submerged by construction of Srisailam dam. The well known poet Kudavelly Srinivas Rao lived in Kudavelly village and has been documented in Golkonda Kavula Sanchika Book published in 1934 by Suravaram Pratapa Reddy.
