= Adur =

Adur may refer to:

== Places ==
- Adur, Anekal, a village in the southern state of Karnataka, India
- Adur, Azerbaijan, a village in the Quba Rayon
- Adur, Bangalore South, a village in the southern state of Karnataka, India
- Adur, Haveri, a village in the southern state of Karnataka, India
- Adur, Iran, a village in Kohgiluyeh and Boyer-Ahmad Province, Iran
- Adur, Shimoga, a village in the southern state of Karnataka, India
- Adur District, England
- River Adur, England

== Other uses ==
- Anthony Adur (born 1987), Trinidad and Tobago footballer
- The Middle Persian word for Atar, the Zoroastrian concept of holy fire

== See also ==
- Adoor (disambiguation)
- Adhurs, a 2010 Indian film by V. V. Vinayak
