= Qarxun =

Qarxun or Karkhun may refer to:

- Karkhun, Armenia
- Qarxun, Nakhchivan, Azerbaijan
- Qarxun, Quba, Azerbaijan
- Aşağı Qarxun, Azerbaijan
- Yuxarı Qarxun, Azerbaijan
