= Adoor (disambiguation) =

Adoor may also refer to:

Places

- Adoor, a municipality in Pathanamthitta district, Kerala, India
- Adoor, a village in Kasaragod district, Kerala, India
- Adoor, a village in Karnataka, India
- Adoor Palam, a village in Kannur district, Kerala, India
- Adoor Lok Sabha constituency, a previous parliamentary constituency in Kerala, India

People

- Adoor Gopalakrishnan, Indian film director
- Adoor Bhasi, Indian actor
- Adoor Bhavani, Indian actress
- Adoor Pankajam, Indian actress
- Adoor Prakash, Indian politician

== See also ==
- Adur (disambiguation)
