= Qarxun, Yevlakh =

Qarxun, Yevlakh may refer to:

- Aşağı Qarxun, Azerbaijan
- Yuxarı Qarxun, Azerbaijan
