= Jainism in North Karnataka =

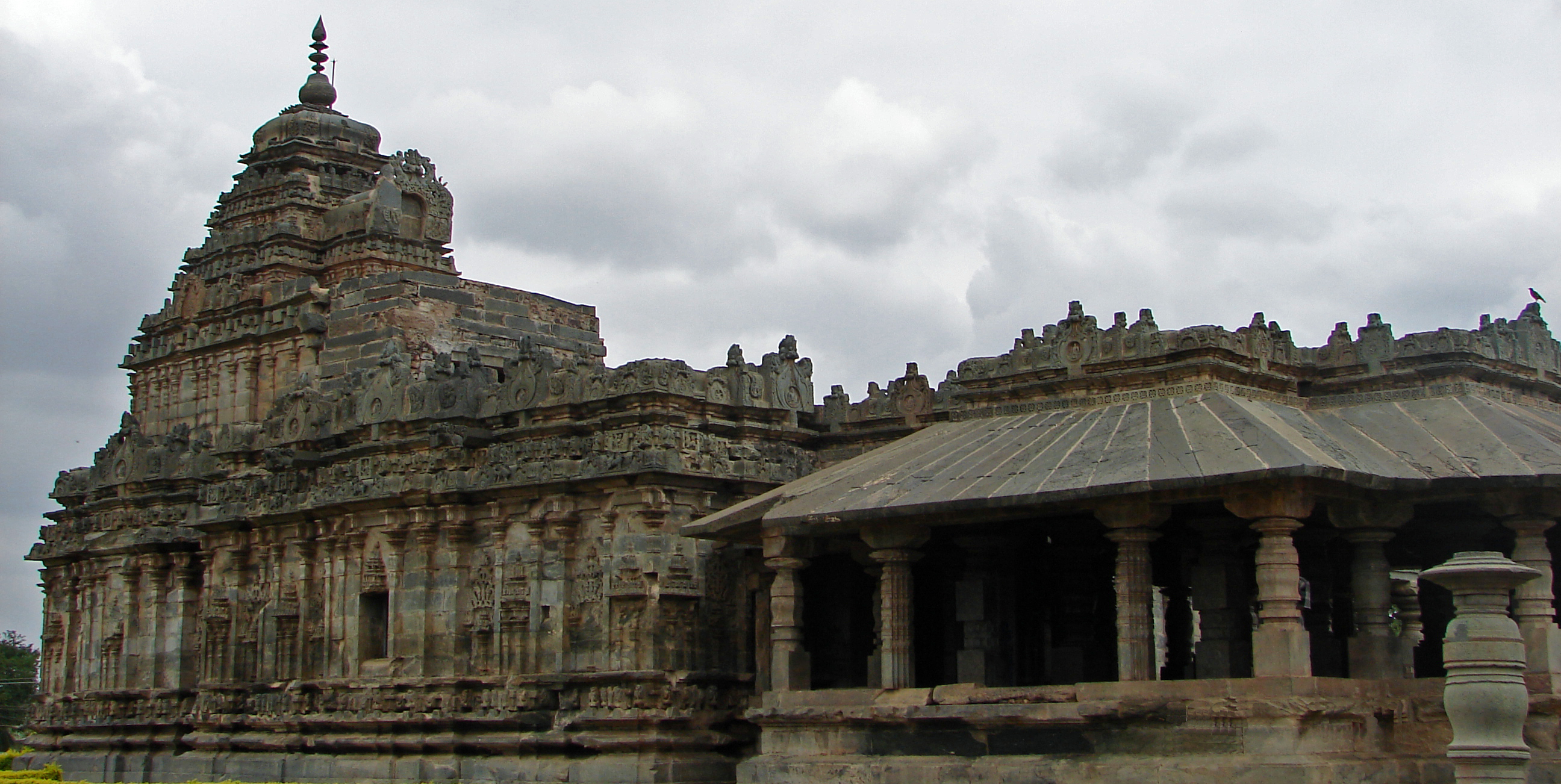
Brahma Jinalaya at Lakkundi

Jainism in North Karnataka flourished under the Chalukyas, Kadamba, Rashtrakutas, and Vijayanagara Empire. Imbued with religious feeling, patronage was extended towards the building of Jain temple and it garnered high repute among the people, particularly the ruling classes and the mercantile community; effectively getting treated as the state religion.

== Literature ==
The Kannada poet Adikavi Pampa’s wrote Vikramarjuna Vijaya, also known as Pampa Bharata, and also the Adipurana, which narrates the story of Rishabhanatha, the first tirthankara. The Neminatha Purana, which offers information of the 22nd tirthankara Neminatha, provides a Jain interpretation for the story of Krishna and the Pandavas.

== Jain architecture ==
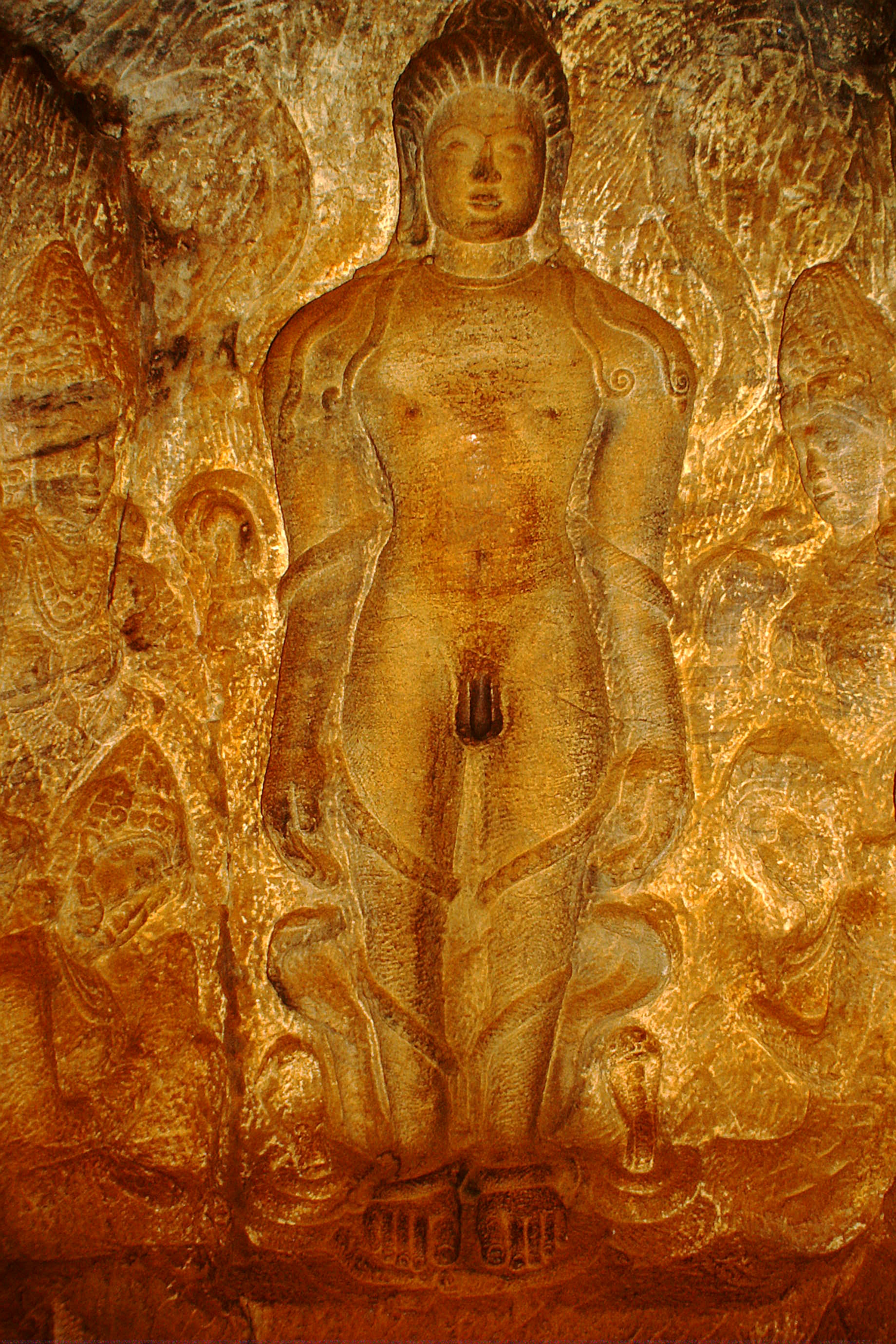
Bahubali in Jain Cave temple No. 4 at Badami, 6th century

Jain architecture can be classified into two categories namely basadi and betta. Basadi is a Jain monastery or temple where an image of one of the twenty-four tirthankaras (saints) is installed and worshipped. They were built in the Dravidian style and the oldest basadi can be traced back to at least the first century AD. Betta is a hill with an open courtyard containing the image of Gommata or Gommateswara.

The earliest dated structure is a basadi at Halasi built under the Kadamba Dynasty of Banavasi laying the foundation for Jain architecture in North Karnataka.

Rastrakutas period is the golden age of Jainism in Karnataka. The Jaina monuments of the Rashtrakutas period are found at Pattadakal, Malkhed, Lakshmeshwar, Koppal, Bankur, of North Karnataka. Jainism exerted considerable influence over the cultural life of Karnataka during the rule of the Rashtrakutas. Several basadi were erected for the further propagation of the religion in the State. Important among them is the Parsvanatha Basadi at Ron with its exquisitely carved grills depicting gandharvas in scrollwork.

Kadambas of Banavasi were known to be patrons of Jainism. After the rule of the Kadambas of Banavasi most parts of north Karnataka came under the rule of the early Chalukya or Badami Chalukyas.

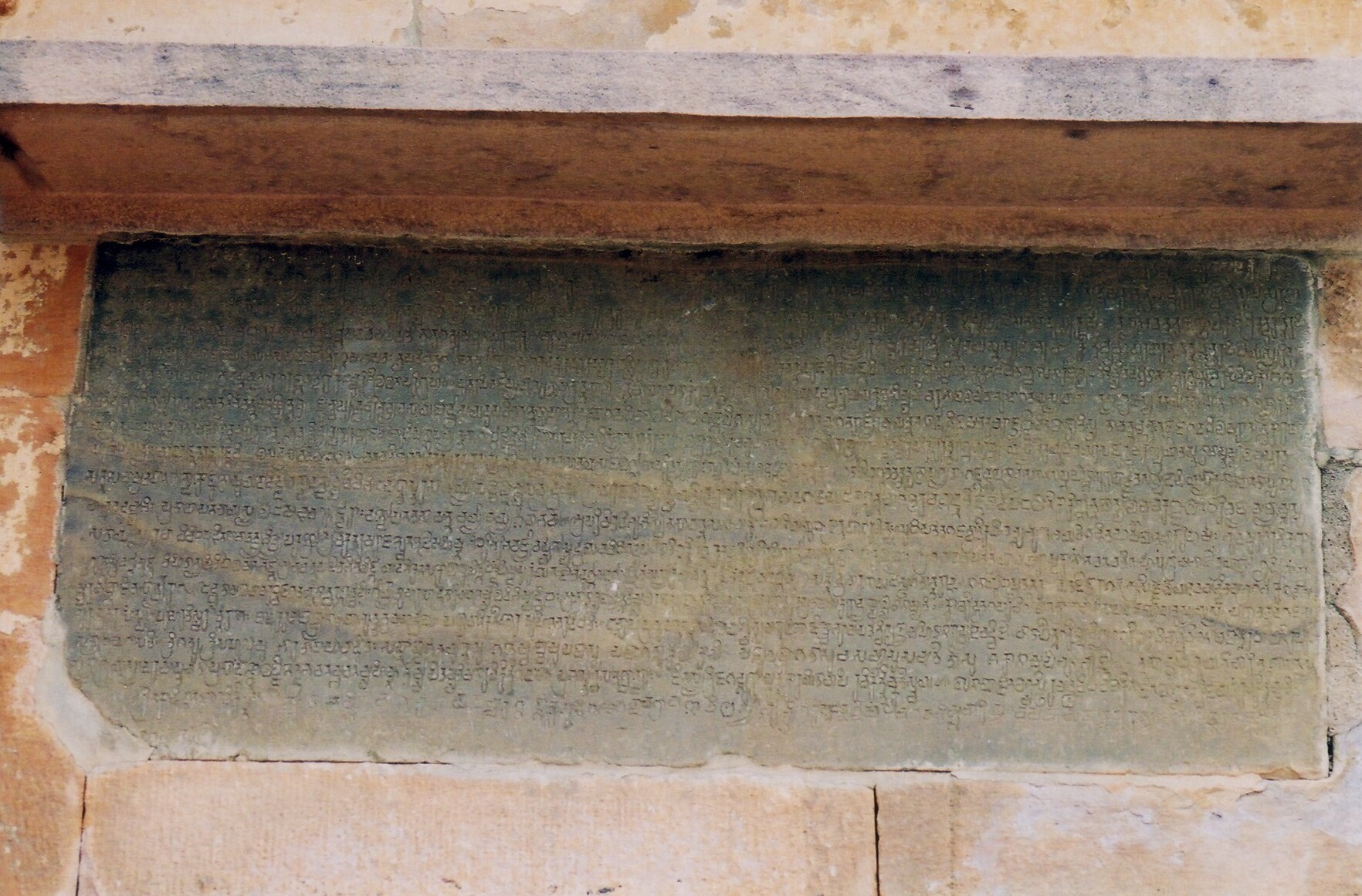
Inscription at Meguti temple Aihole in Sanskrit language and old Kannada script

Aihole has Jaina cave temple, it has an open mandapa and a Sabhamandapa. Garbhagriha has the sculpture of Mahavira in padmasana. On the sides are a yaksha and yakshi standing. Shanka Basadi at Lakshmeshwar was built in 7th century during Rashtrakuta period. This Jinalaya is dedicated to Neminatha and Jinalya got his name from a shankha, the symbol of Neminatha. The Adi Purana was written by Adikavi Pampa in this Basadi. Other Jain temple includes Jinalaya at Hallur, The Jinalaya at Adur built by Dharmagamunda.

Jain Narayana temple located on the Pattadakal, was built in the Dravidian style by the Rashtrakutas of Manyakheta in 9th century. It consists of a mukhamandapa (main hall), a navaranga, shukanasa, and garbhagriha. The principle deity of the temple is Parshvanatha, the 23rd Tirthankara of Jainism.

Badami cave temples were built in 7th century by Chalukya dynasty. It features detailed carvings of the tirthankaras Mahavira, Parshvanatha, Adinatha, and Bahubali, and Indrabhuti Gautama. Idols of Yakshas, Yakshis, Padmavati are also present here.

Brahma Jinalaya, Lakkundi was built during Western Chalukya rule in mid-11th century. The temple has single shrine connected to a closed hall via a vestibule that is connected to a mandapa. The temple has idol of Mahavira, Brahma, Saraswati, and Gajalakshmi.

Padmabbarasi basadi is the biggest Rashtrakuta temple in Karnataka. This temple was built during the period of Krishna III, by Padmabbarasi, the queen of Ganga Permadi Bhutayya in 950 AD.

Navagraha Jain Temple at Varur near Hubli is one of the major pilgrimage. The temple features a 61 feet (18.6 m) tall monolithic idol of Parshvanatha and the smaller statues of other eight tirthankaras. The statue stands on a 48-foot high pedestal making the total height 109 feet. The statue is the tallest statue of the Parshvanatha.

== Dakshina Bharatha Jain Sabha ==
Dakshina Bharati Jain Sabha is a social service organization of the Jains of South India. The organization has its headquarter at Kolhapur. The association is credited with being one of the first Jain associations to start reform movements among the Jains in modern India. The organization mainly seeks to represent the interests of the native Jains of Maharashtra (Marathi Jains), Karnataka (Kannada Jains) and Goa.

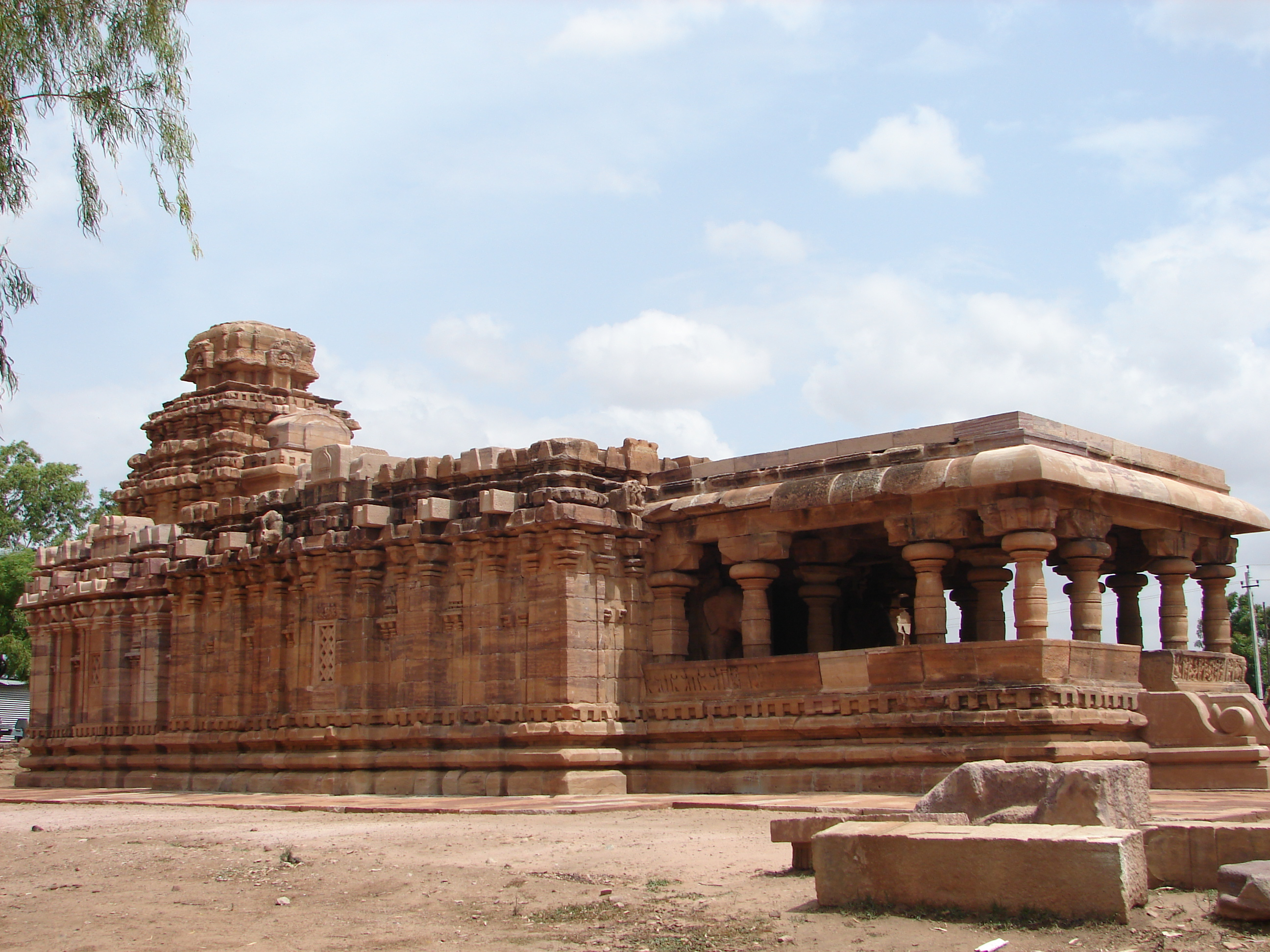
Jain Narayana temple, a UNESCO World Heritage Site

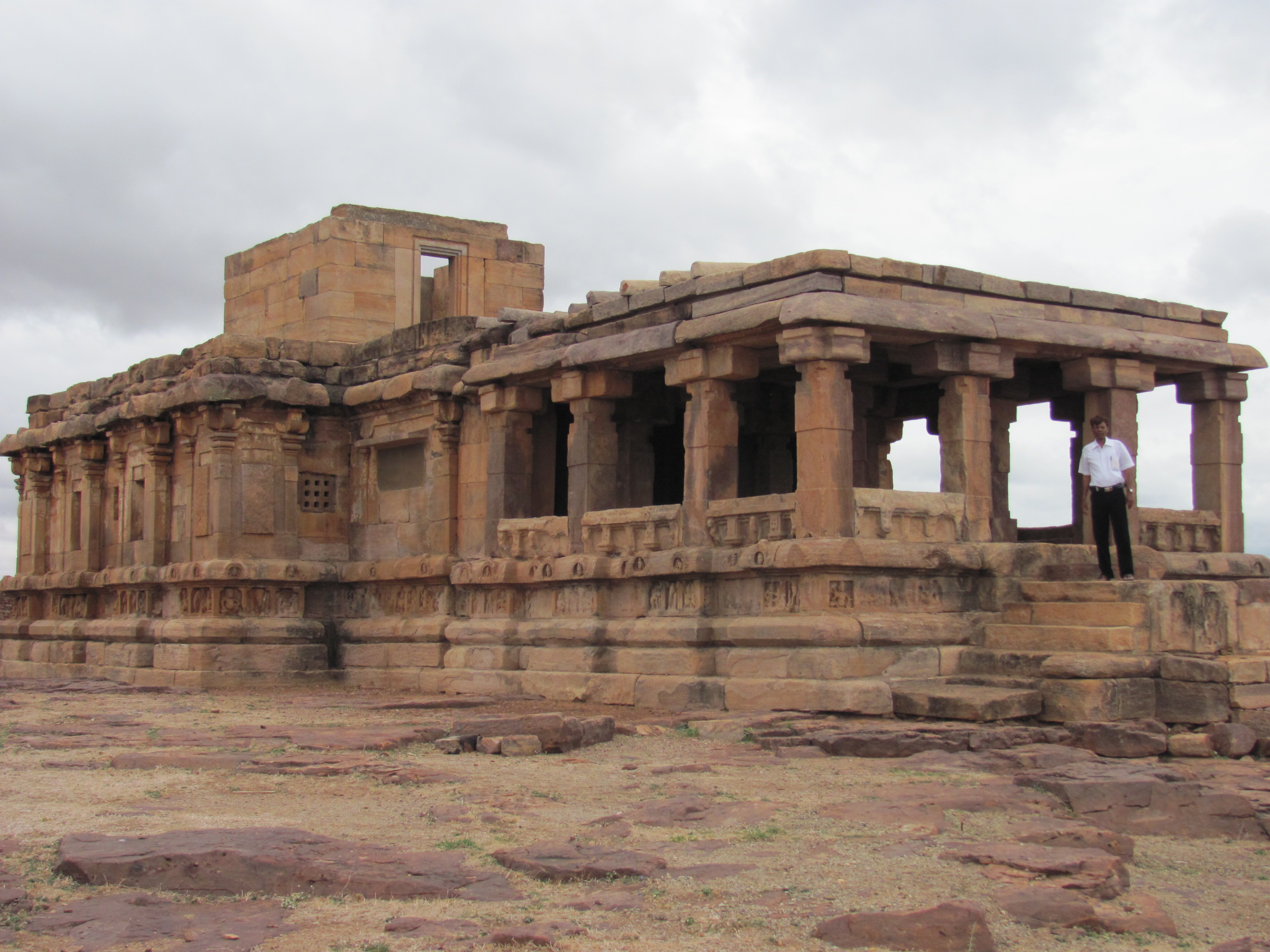
Meguti Jain temple, Aihole

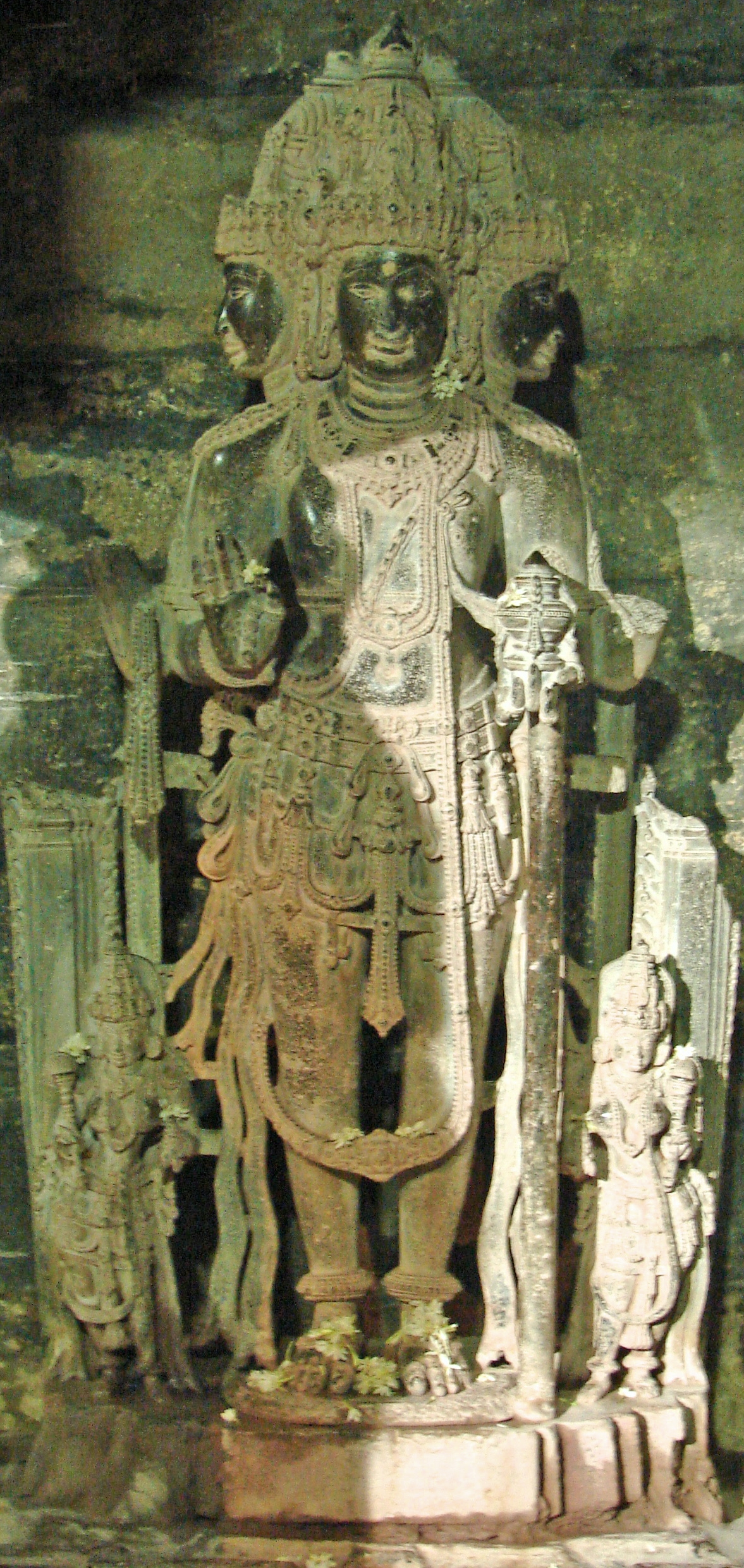
The famous Chaturmukha Brahma image at Jain Temple, Lakkundi, 11th century CE

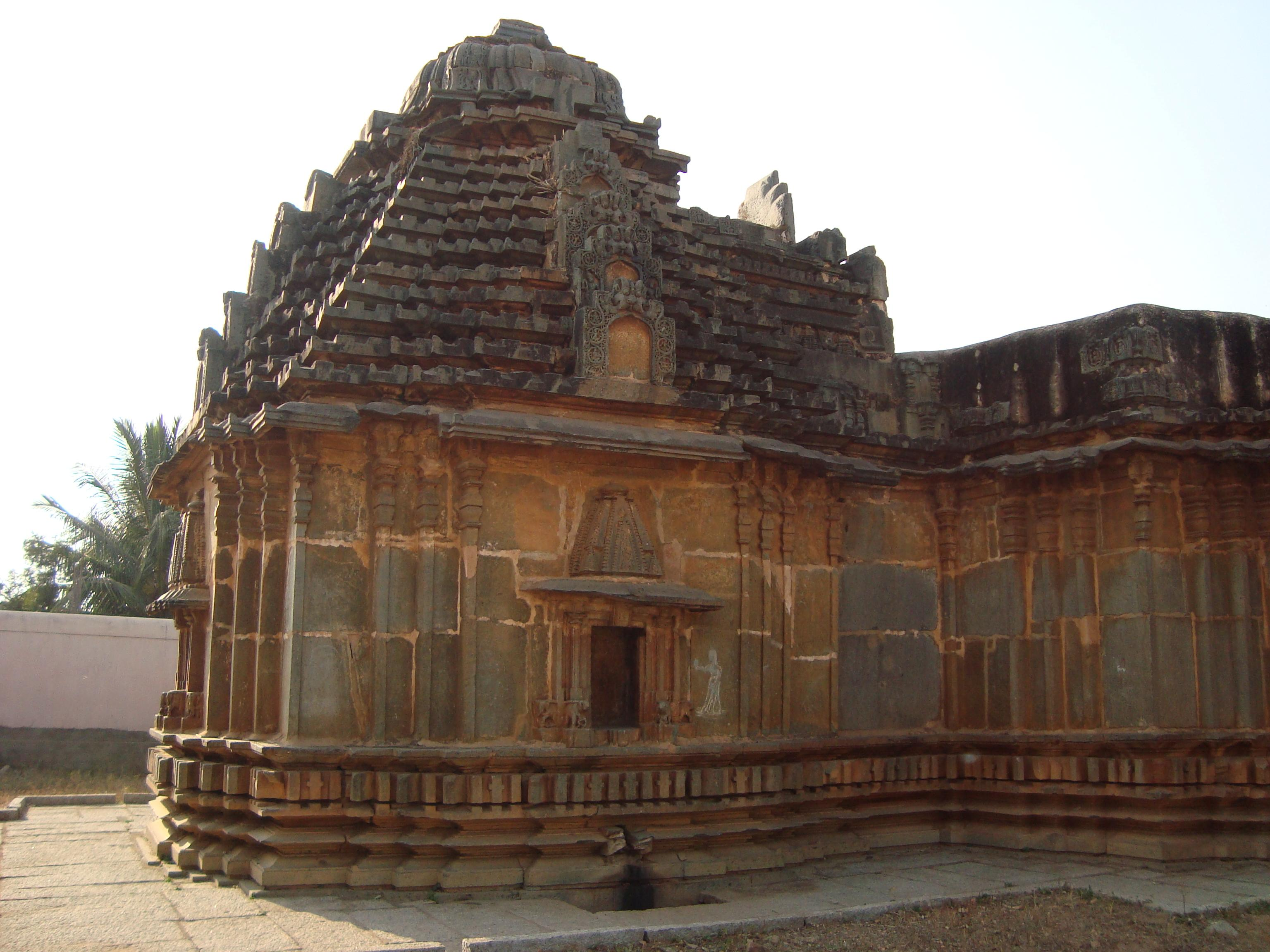
Shanka Basadi, 8th century

== See also ==
- Jainism in Maharashtra
- Jain Bunt
- Jainism in Karnataka
- Jainism in Kerala
- Jainism in Tamil Nadu
