= Aihole inscription =

Sanskrit inscription dated 634–635 CE

Aihole prashasti
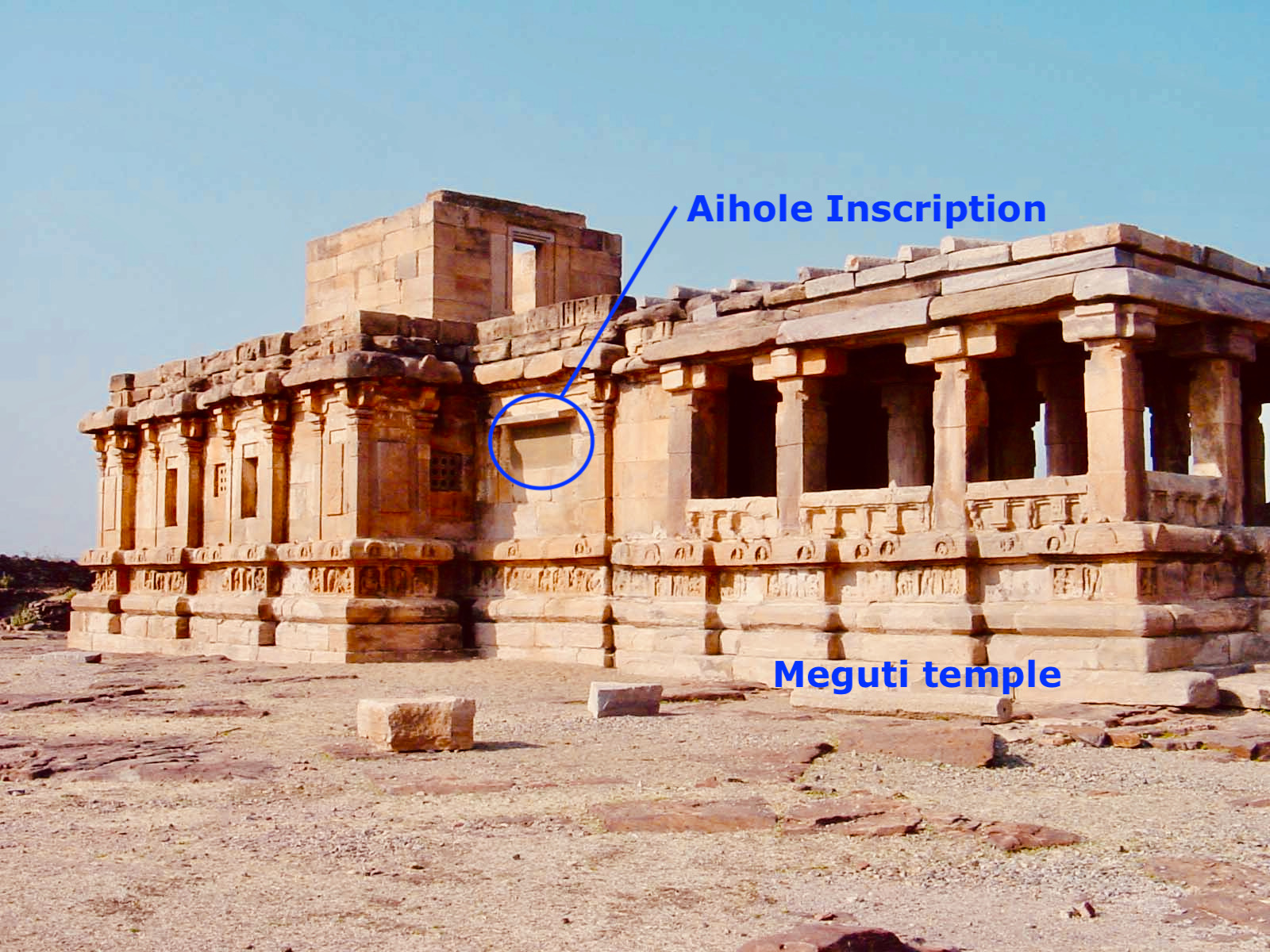
- Material: Stone, near Meguti Jain temple
- Writing: Sanskrit poetry of Ravikirti .It also informs us about the great war of Mahabharata.
- Created: 634 CE
- Period/culture: Chalukyas of Vatapi
- Place: Aihole, Karnataka, India
- Present location: 16.017222°N 75.884167°E

Location
- Aihole Inscription (India) Location of the inscription

The Aihole inscription, also known as the Aihole prashasti, is a nineteen line Sanskrit inscription at Meguti Jain temple in Aihole, Karnataka, India. A eulogy dated 634–635 CE, it was composed by the Jain poet Ravikirti in honor of his patron emperor Pulakeshin II Satyashraya of the Vatapi Chalukya dynasty. The inscription is partly damaged and corrupted – its last two lines were added at a later date.

Since the 1870s, the inscription was recorded several times, revised, republished and retranslated by Fleet, Kielhorn and others. The inscription is a prashasti for the early Western Chalukyas. It is notable for its historical details mixed in with myth, and the scholarly disagreements it has triggered. It is also an important source of placing political events and literature – such as of Kalidasa – that must have been completed well before 634 CE, the date of this inscription.

== Location and history ==
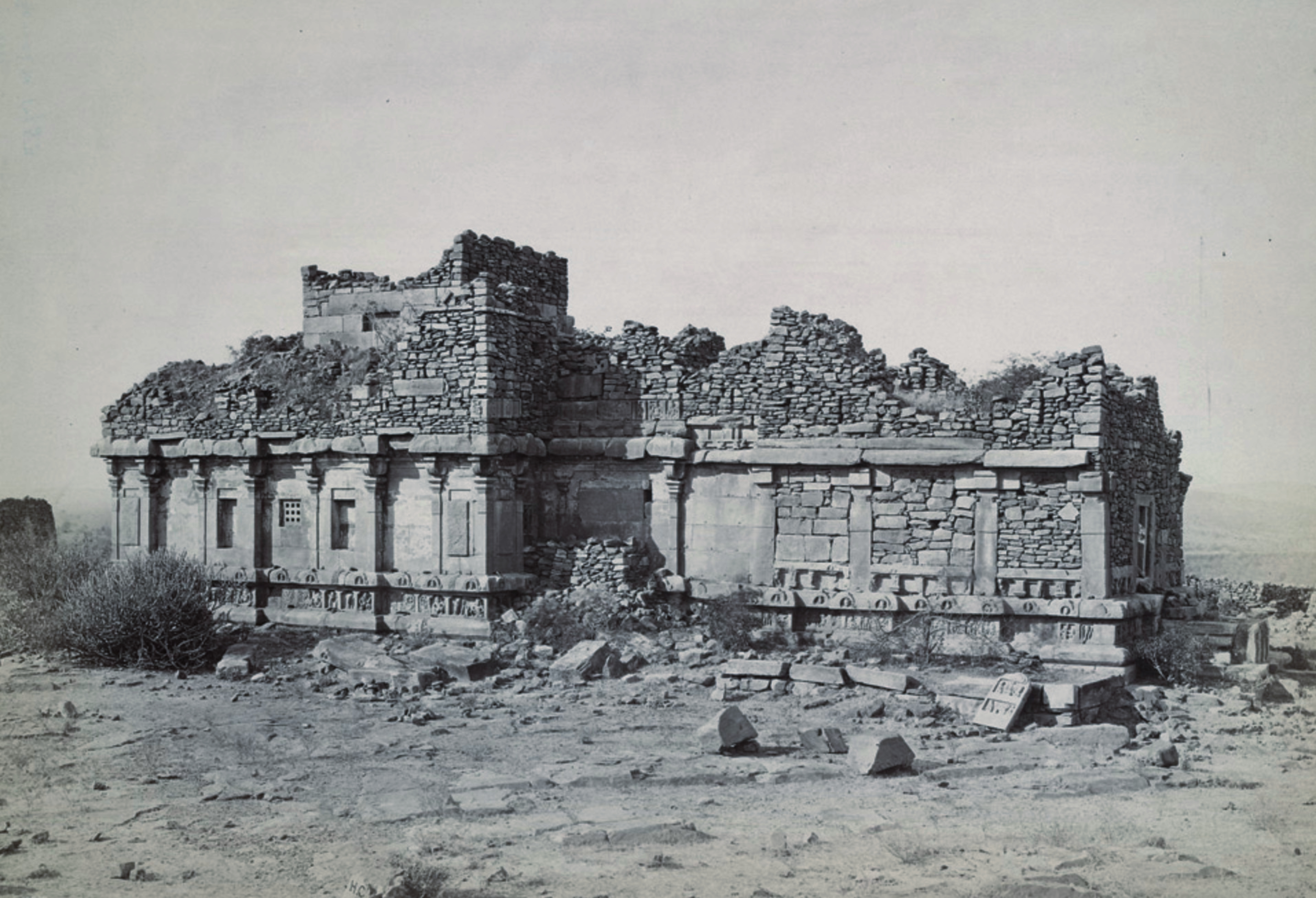
This is an archival photo of the Meguti Jain temple ruins from the 1880s. The inscription is on the wall connecting the mandapa and the garbhagriya.

The Aihole inscription of Ravikirti, also known as the Aihole Inscription of Pulakesin II, is found at the hilltop Meguti Jain temple, southeast of Aihole Durga temple and archaeological museum The temple is referred to as the Melu-gudi, lit. "the temple that is high above", also Myagudi, Myaguti and Megudi – rustic and phonetic variants of Melu-gudi. Aihoḷe – also known as Ayyavole or Aryapura in historic texts – was the original capital of the Chalukyas dynasty founded in 540 CE, before the capital moved to Vatapi in the 7th century. The Malprabha valley sites;such as Aihole, Badami, Pattadakal and Mahakuta emerged as major regional centres of arts in early India with Dravida and Nagara styles of temple architecture. Meguti Jain temple is only one among hundreds of temples built in that era. They were preceded by the famed Badami cave temples and many other forms

Fleet was the first to edit and publish a photo-lithograph of the Aihole inscription in 1876. Fleet published an improved photo-lithograph, a revised version of the text with his translation in 1879. The significance of the inscription as well as issues with reconciling the text with other inscriptions attracted the interest of other scholars. The Sanskrit scholar, Kielhorn published a revised version of the photo-lithograph. in 1901.

== Description ==
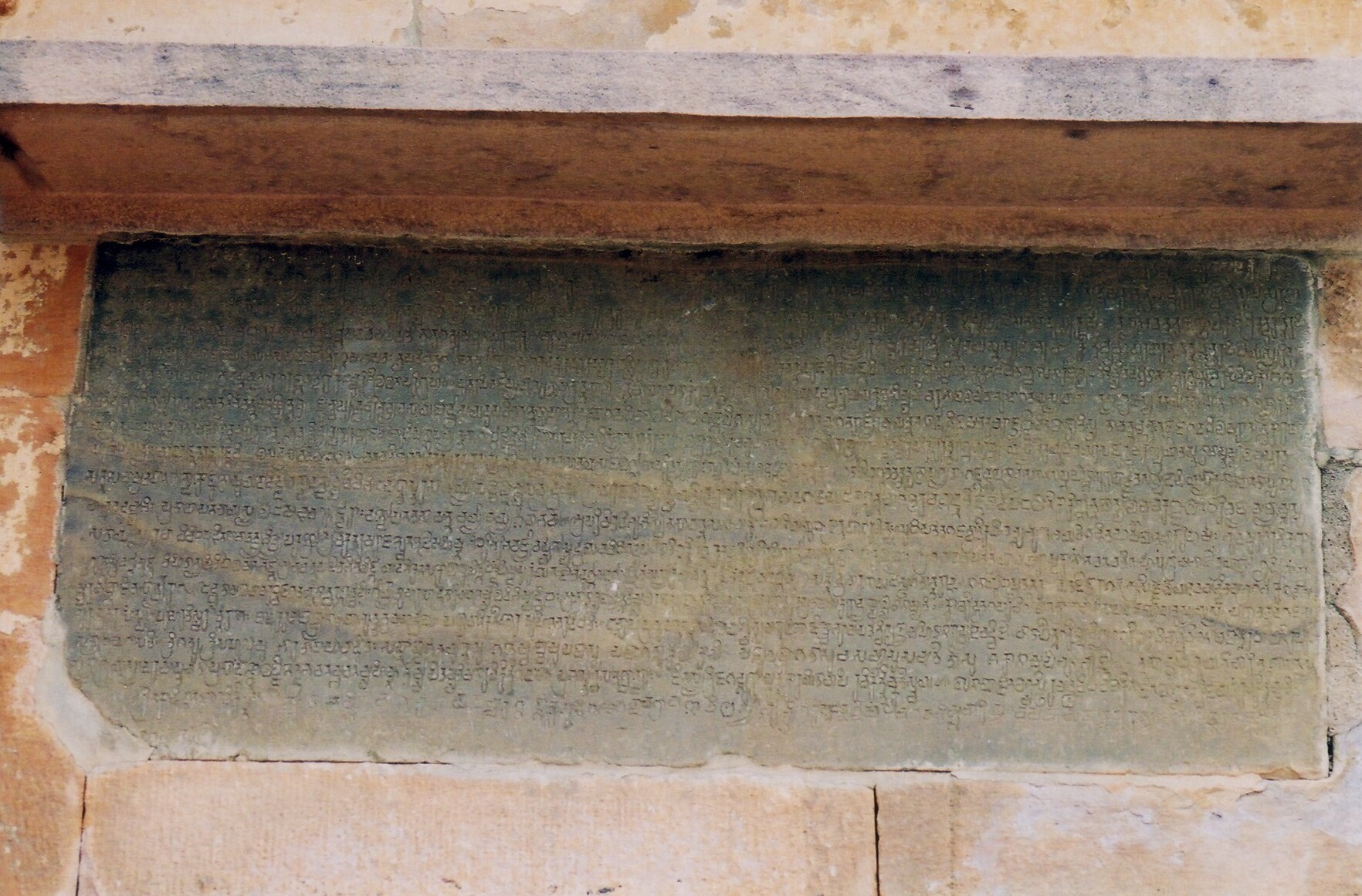
The inscription

The inscription has 19 lines of Sanskrit in old Chalukyan script. It is on a stone set as a part of the east outer wall of the Meguti temple, with the text covering about 4.75 feet by 2 feet surface. The letters are between 0.5 and 0.62 inches in height. The stylistic difference suggests that the 18th and 19th lines were added later, not attributed to Ravikirti.

The Aihole inscription is in Sanskrit verse in classic chhandas (meters, Sanskrit prosody). The 17 original lines consist of 37 verses. The meters deployed include the standard shlokas in 7 verses, 2 in aupachchhandasika, 3 in arya, 4 of vasantatilaka, 5 in malini, 3 in sardulavikridita. Further verses use distinct cases of chandas such as upajati, indravajra and vamsastha. The strict rules of Sanskrit meters are visible in the Aihole inscription, which suggests that the early 7th-century Ravikirti wasa master of classical Sanskrit tradition.

The inscription is a prashasti. weaving mythologies. The author compares his patron Pulakesin II to legends and himself to some of the greatest Sanskrit poets such Kalidasa and Bharavi – revered in the Hindu tradition. The inscription borrows phrases from Kalidasa's influential work, from well known 6th and 7th-century inscriptions found in Nagarjuni hills, in Bodh-Gaya, and one of the earliest known inscriptions in Cambodia. Ravikirti builds upon several verses found in Raghuvaṃśa of Kalidasa and the Kirātārjunīya of Bharavi – famed works of Hindu Vishnu and Shiva traditions respectively. Ravikirti credits these authors by naming them indirectly in his Aihole inscription, by calling himself as good as them. The purity of the Sanskrit and the poetic flourishes of Ravikriti's composition in the alamkara-sastras place him "in the front rank of court-poets and writers of prashastis". According to Richard Salomon, the Aihole inscription excels as a literary form alongside many early Sanskrit inscriptions at Allahabad and Deopara.

The Aihole inscription is a Jain inscription opening with salutations to Jinendra in verse 1. A 'prashasti', it praises Pulakesin II for his generosity.

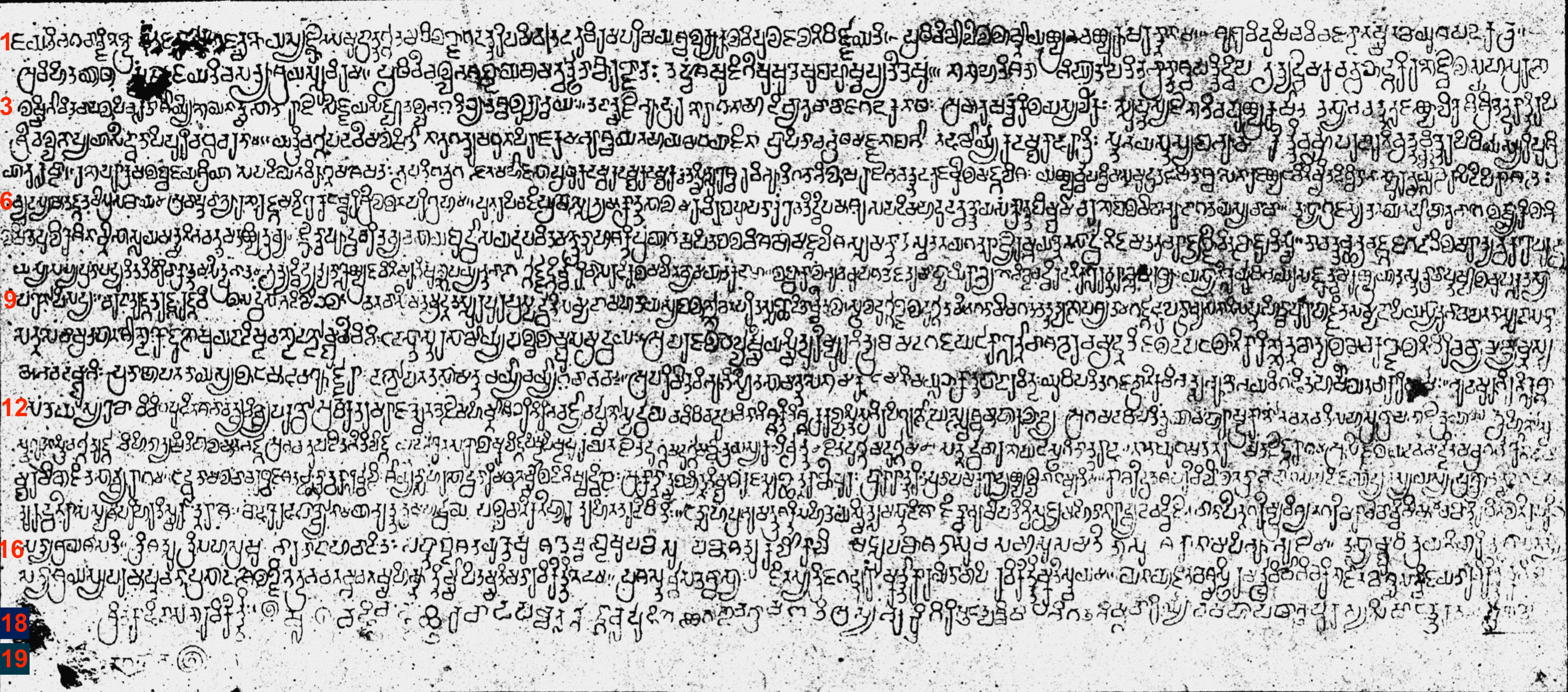
634 CE Aihole inscription Meguti Jain temple, 1879 photolithography print. Lines 18 and 19 are later additions.

=== Date ===
The verses 33–34 of the inscription state the date, 3735 after the Bharata war, (Note: This refers to the subject of the epic Mahabharata, whose legends are also covered by the literature of the Jain tradition. Fleet's original reading of the date was an error, the correction published in 1879. He concluded that Kaliyuga 3735 may be the best reading.) or saka samvat 556. This corresponds to 634–635 CE.

== Inscription ==
The nineteen lines of the inscription have been variously translated, some of the music of the original lost in the European translation. The translation published by Kielhorn is as follows:

Aihole inscription
Verses	Translation (Franz Kielhorn)	Notes
V1–2	Victorious is the holy Jinendra ─ he who is exempt from old age, death and birth ─ in the sea of whose knowledge the whole world is comprised like an island. And next, long victorious is the immeasurable, wide ocean of the Chalukya family, which is the birth-place of jewels of men that are ornaments of the diadem of the earth.	This 7th-century greeting remains a tradition among contemporary era Jains as "Jai Jinendra".
V3–4	And victorious for very long is Satyasraya, who in bestowing gifts and honors on the brave and on the learned, both together on either, observes not the rule of correspondency of number. When many members of that race, bent on conquest, applied to whom the title of Favourite of the Earth had at last become appropriate, had passed away,	This acknowledgment of gifts and honors from the patron being praised is a key part of a prashasti such as the Aihole inscription. The "rule of correspondency" is a reference to Panini's 1.3.10, which refers to the ancient Indian tradition where the brave were given gifts by the king, while the learned were given honors. Further, the poet calls his patron Satyasraya (ocean of truth).
V5–6	There was, of the Chalukya lineage, the king named Jayasimha-vallabha, who in battle ─ where horses, foot soldiers and elephants, bewildered, fell down under the strokes of many hundreds of weapons, and where thousands of frightful headless trunks and of flashes of rays of swords were leaping to and fro─ by his bravery made Fortune his own, even though she is suspected of fickleness.	The poet is tracing his patron's lineage, with poetic praise and exaggerated claims of thousands of elephants killed in wars by one of his ancestors.
V7–8	His son was he who was named Raṇarâga, of divine dignity, the one master of the world, whose superhuman nature, (even) when he was asleep, people knew from the pre-eminence of his form. His son was Polekêśin, who, though endowed with the moon’s Beauty, and though the favourite of Fortune, became the bridegroom of Vatapipuri. Whose path in the pursuit of the three objects of life the kings on earth even now are unable to follow; and bathed by whom with the water of the purificatory rite, when he performed the horse-sacrifice, the earth beamed with brightness.	Polekesin is dubbed as Pulakesin II in modern literature; while the city of Vatapipuri is now called Badami. The three objects of life are dharma, artha and kama, per Hindu texts. The horse-sacrifice (ashvamedha) is a Vedic ritual; this and other inscriptions of this era – such as the Mahakuta Pillar inscription – repeatedly affirm that the Badami Chalukyas cherished Vedic practices and were a Hindu dynasty. This acknowledgment from a Jain poet makes it notable.
V9–10	His son was Kîrtivarman, the night of doom to the Naḷas, Mauryas and Kadambas, whose mind, although his thoughts kept aloof from others’ wives, was attracted by the Fortune of his adversary. Who, having secured the fortune of victory by his valour in war, being a scent-elephant of a king, of great strength, at once completely broke down the multitude of the broad kadamba trees ─ the Kadambas.	The Kadambas referred to here are the same as the Karnataka dynasty discussed in the Talagunda pillar inscription.
V11–12	When his desire was bent on the dominion of the lord of the gods, his younger brother Maṅgalêśa became king, who by the sheets of dust of his army of horse, encamped on the shores of the eastern and western seas, stretched an awning over the quarters. Who in that house which was the battle-field, took in marriage the damsel, the Fortune of the Kaṭachchuris, having scattered the gathering gloom, the array of elephants, with hundreds of bright-rayed lamps, the swords.	This is the same Mangalesha who helped build the Cave 3 (Vishnu) and Cave 4 (Jain) in Badami, and who is mentioned in the Cave 3 inscription and described in the Mahakuta Pillar inscription.
V13–14	And again, when he was desirous of taking the island of Rêvatî, his great army with many bright banners, which had ascended the ramparts, as it was reflected in the water of the sea appeared like Varuṇa’s forces, quickly come there at once at his word (of command). When his elder brother’s son, named Polekêśin, of a dignity like Nahusha’s, was coveted by Fortune, and finding his uncle to be jealous of him thereat, had formed the resolution to wander abroad as an exile,	An example of comparing Pulakesin II era to mythical legends, here to the forces of the sea deity Varuna. It also paints Pulakesin II as not eager for power, as he had resolved to leave Chalukya kingdom, self-exile and wander in far away lands.
V15–16	That Maṅgalêśa, whose great strength became on all sides reduced by the application of the powers of good counsel and energy gathered by him, abandoned, together with the effort to secure the kingdom for his own son, both that no mean kingdom of his and his life. Then, on the subversion of that rule encompassed by the darkness of enemies, the whole world grew light again, invaded as it were by the lustrous rays of His irresistible splendor. Or when was it that the sky ceased to be black like a swarm of bees with thundering clouds, in which flashes of lightning were dancing like banners, and the edges of which were crushed in the rushing wind?	These verses are the primary source for the war of succession between Mangalesha and his nephew Pulakesin II. It also claims that neighboring kingdoms saw this war as an opportunity to seize parts of the Chalukya kingdom, all to be defeated by Pulakesin II.
V17–18	When, having found the opportunity, he who was named Âppâyika, and Gôvinda approached with their troops of elephants to conquer the country north of the Bhaimarathî, the one in battle through His armies came to know the taste of fear, while the other at once received the reward of the services rendered by him. When He was besieging Vanavâsî, which for a girdle has the rows of haṁsa birds that sport on the high waves of the Varadâ as their play-place, and which by its wealth rivaled the city of the gods, that fortress on land, having the surface of the earth all around covered with the great sea of his army, to the looker-on seemed at once converted into a fortress in the water.	Bhaimarathi is same as river Bhimarathi
V19–20	Although in former days they had acquired happiness by renouncing the seven sins, the Gaṅga and Âḷupa lords, being subdued by his dignity, were always intoxicated by drinking the nectar of close attendance upon him. In the Koṅkaṇas the impetuous waves of the forces directed by Him speedily swept away the rising wavelets of pools ─ the Mauryas.	the poet paints the other kings as weak by first showing that they had renounced sins but then they fell into them again, in contrast to Pulakesin II's character and strengths.
V21–22	When, radiant like the destroyer of Pura, he besieged Purî, the Fortune of the western sea, with hundreds of ships in appearance like arrays of rutting elephants, the sky, dark-blue as a young lotus and covered with tiers of massive clouds, resembled the sea, and the sea was like the sky. Subdued by His splendor, the Lâṭas, Mâḷavas and Gûrjaras became as it were teachers of how feudatories, subdued by force, ought to behave.	the poet alludes to Shiva with "destroyer of Pura", and compares Pulakesin II to Shiva; the Puri mentioned here is not the one in Odisha, but on coast of Maharashtra; the poetic comparisons here and nearby verses borrow from Kalidasa's fictional works.
V23–24	Harsha, whose lotus-feet were arrayed with the rays of the jewels of the diadems of hosts of feudatories prosperous with unmeasured might, through Him had his mirth (harsha) melted away by fear, having become loathsome with his rows of lordly elephants fallen in battle. While He was ruling the earth with his broad armies, the neighbourhood of the Vindhya, by no means destitute of the lustre of the many sandbanks of the Rêvâ, shone even more brightly by his great personal splendor, having to be avoided by his elephants because, as it seemed, they by their bulk rivaled the mountains.	The poet exaggerates by claiming the elephants in Pulakesin's army rivaled and exceeded the size of Vindhya mountains, when the Vindhya hills are impassable to them and military conquests typically avoided this region. This and nearby verses borrow many phrases and allusions from classic Sanskrit poetry on Hindu legends, these were composed long before Ravikirti.
V25–26	Almost equal to Indra, He by means of all the three powers, gathered by him according to rule, and by his noble birth and other excellent qualities, acquired the sovereignty over the three Mahârâshṭrakas with their nine and ninety thousand villages. Through the excellencies of their householders prominent in the pursuit of the three objects of life, and having broken the pride of other rulers of the earth, the Kaliṅgas with the Kôsalas by His army were made to evince signs of fear.	Fleet interpreted Indra as the deity, also called Sakra, a poetic flourish to praise and compare Pulakeshin to the king of gods. Indra here has also been interpreted as a Rashtrakuta king, but a subject of many disputes. These verses are one of the earliest mention of a region named "Maharashtra", now a state north of Aihole.
V27–28	Hard pressed (pishṭa) by him, Pishṭapura became a fortress not difficult of access; wonderful (to relate), the ways of the Kali age to him were inaccessible! Ravaged by him, the water of Kunâḷa ─ coloured with the blood of men killed with many weapons, and the land within it overspread with arrays of accoutered elephants ─ was like the cloud-covered sky in which the red evening-twilight has risen.	these verses illustrate how Ravikirti borrowed from Kalidasa's Raghuvamsa; the Kunala here possibly refers to territory near river Godavari, states Kielhorn.
V29–30	With his sixfold forces, the hereditary troops and the rest, who raised spotless chowries, hundreds of flags, umbrellas, and darkness, and who churned the enemy elated with the sentiments of heroism and energy, He caused the splendour of the lord of the Pallavas, who had opposed the rise of his power, to be obscured by the dust of his army, and to vanish behind the walls of Kâñchîpura. When straightway he strove to conquer the Chôḷas, the Kâvêrî, who has the darting carps for her tremulous eyes, had her current obstructed by the causeway formed by his elephants whose rutting-juice was dripping down, and avoided the contact with the ocean.	this and the next verses are notable for the claimed conquest of the Pallavas and they retreating to Kanchipuram, which the poet alleges indirectly brought prosperity to the kingdoms in what are now Tamil Nadu and Kerala.
V31–32	There he caused great prosperity to the Chôḷas, Kêraḷas and Pâṇḍyas, he being the hot-rayed sun to the hoar-frost─ the army of the Pallavas. While he, Satyâśraya, endowed with the powers of energy, mastery and good counsel, ─ having conquered all the quarters, having dismissed the kings full of honours, having done homage to gods and Brâhmaṇs, having entered the city of Vâtâpî─ is ruling, like one city, this earth which has the dark-blue waters of the surging sea for its moat;	Mentions Vatapi as another name for Badami, as well as Pulakesin II giving homage to gods and Brahmans
V33–34	when thirty (and) three thousand and five years besides, joined with seven hundred years, have passed since the Bhârata war; And when fifty (and) six and five hundred years of the Śaka kings also have gone by in Kali age;	Gives two dates of the inscription; the "(and)" is an interpretation of Kielhorn.
V35–37	This stone mansion of Jinêndra, a mansion of every kind of greatness, has been caused to be built by the wise Ravikîrti, who has obtained the highest favour of that Satyâśraya whose rule is bounded by the three oceans. Of this eulogy and of this dwelling of the Jina revered in the three worlds, the wise Ravikîrti himself is the author and also the founder. May that Ravikîrti be victorious, who full of discernment has used the abode of the Jina, firmly built of stone, for a new treatment of his theme, and who thus by his poetic skill has attained to the fame of Kâḷidâsa and of Bhâravi!	Attest that the Meguti temple is a Jain mansion for the Jinas, built by Ravikirti with permission and support of Pulakesin II. The repetitive statements about Tirthankaras affirms this to be a Jain inscription. The poet declares his skill and fame as equal to Kalidasa and Bharavi.
V38–42	(corrupt insertion at a later date)	These lines announce forever grant of lands and the gifts of tax revenue and villages to serve the Jain temple, and that these binding gifts were made by Ravikirti .

== Significance ==
The Aihole inscription, with its different published translations has been a source of Deccan and Indian history in the 6th and 7th-century. It is also a source of controversies and inconsistencies when the claims in the Aihole inscriptions are compared to inscriptions found outside of Badami Chalukya realm. According to Richard Solomon – an Indologist specializing in epigraphical records, the Aihole inscription is a useful source of simple facts such as the date of Meguti Jain temple, Ravikirti's role in building it, the fame of Kalidasa, the state of language and literature in early 7th-century. The Aihole inscription is also significant by providing a definite terminus ante quem of 634 CE for both Kalidasa and Bharavi. The Aihole inscription has been a source of literary and political history close to Ravikirti's generation (early 7th century), but given the highly rhetorical style that blends historic myth, fiction and events, one aimed to boast and flatter one's employer in general public, it need not be historically accurate. Further, states Salomon, one must expect that a court poet would "gloss over, distort, or simply ignore their patron's military defeats". The Aihole inscription must be evaluated in light of independent and reliable corroborative sources, which unfortunately are quite limited.

Except for a few events, many of the claims in the Aihole inscription cannot be confirmed. The victory of Pulakesin II over Emperor Harsha can be corroborated in the writings of Xuanzang (Hsuan Tsang), the Chinese pilgrim who visited India in the 7th-century. However, if the Chinese record is to be read in full and trusted, then the Aihole inscription is glossing over many details. The Harsha-Pulakesin II war continued, records the Chinese pilgrim, because the troops and citizens of Harsha did not submit to Pulakeshin II. The first battle was indeed won by Pulakeshin, yet shortly thereafter it was Harsha who defeated Pulakeshin II near Narmada river in 612 CE (about 20 years before the Ravikirti's inscription). If inscriptions found in central India and the Chinese record are to be trusted, then there was a truce after both sides having won a war, Harsha ruled peacefully for next 30 years to the north of the Narmada river, while Pulakeshin II stayed in the Deccan region. Some scholars have questioned whether the war occurred in 612 CE, or 620 CE, or in early 630s CE because inscriptions found elsewhere are not consistent with the claims of Ravikirti. The Aihole Prashasti is, at its best, a panegyric record that records some battles.

This Chalukyan era Meguti temple inscription is inconsistent with many later Chalukyan inscriptions, states Altekar. For example, later Chalukyan inscriptions allege that its early rulers from Jayasimha and Pulakesin II defeated early Rashtrakuta kings, yet the Aihole inscription makes no mention of these early Rashtrakuta kings. This suggests that stories were being fabricated and inscribed on stone or copper plates. Similarly, Chalukyan copper plates state that Mangalesha handed over the kingdom to Pulakesin II when he came of age, with the added flourish that "can a scion of the Chalukya family ever swerve from the path of duty?". The later records thus assert that there was no war of succession between Mangalesha and Pulakesin II, something the Aihole inscription clearly mentions. Both cannot be true. Either Aihole inscription or the copper plates of Chalukyan dynasty are telling a "pious lie". According to Altekar, this is a gross contradiction, and then sides with Meguti inscription's version. Further, Altekar disagrees with Fleet, and interprets Indra as the name of a real king, rather than deity Indra (Sakra).

According to Raychaudhuri, Ravikirti's claims in verse 22 of the Aihole inscription are unreal and likely an exaggeration in light of inscriptions found in Madhya Pradesh and Gujarat, along with the records of the Chinese pilgrim Xuanzang. Malwa remained independent, as did the Gurjaras. The evidence outside of the Aihole inscription suggests that they were not Pulakesin II's feudatories.

== See also ==
- Indian inscriptions
- Aihole Jain cave
