= Aihole Jain cave =

Jain rock-cut cave temple at Aihole, Karnataka, India

Meena Basadi
- ರಾಕ್ ಕಟ್ ಜೈನ್ ಬಸ್ದಿ ಐಹೊಳೆ
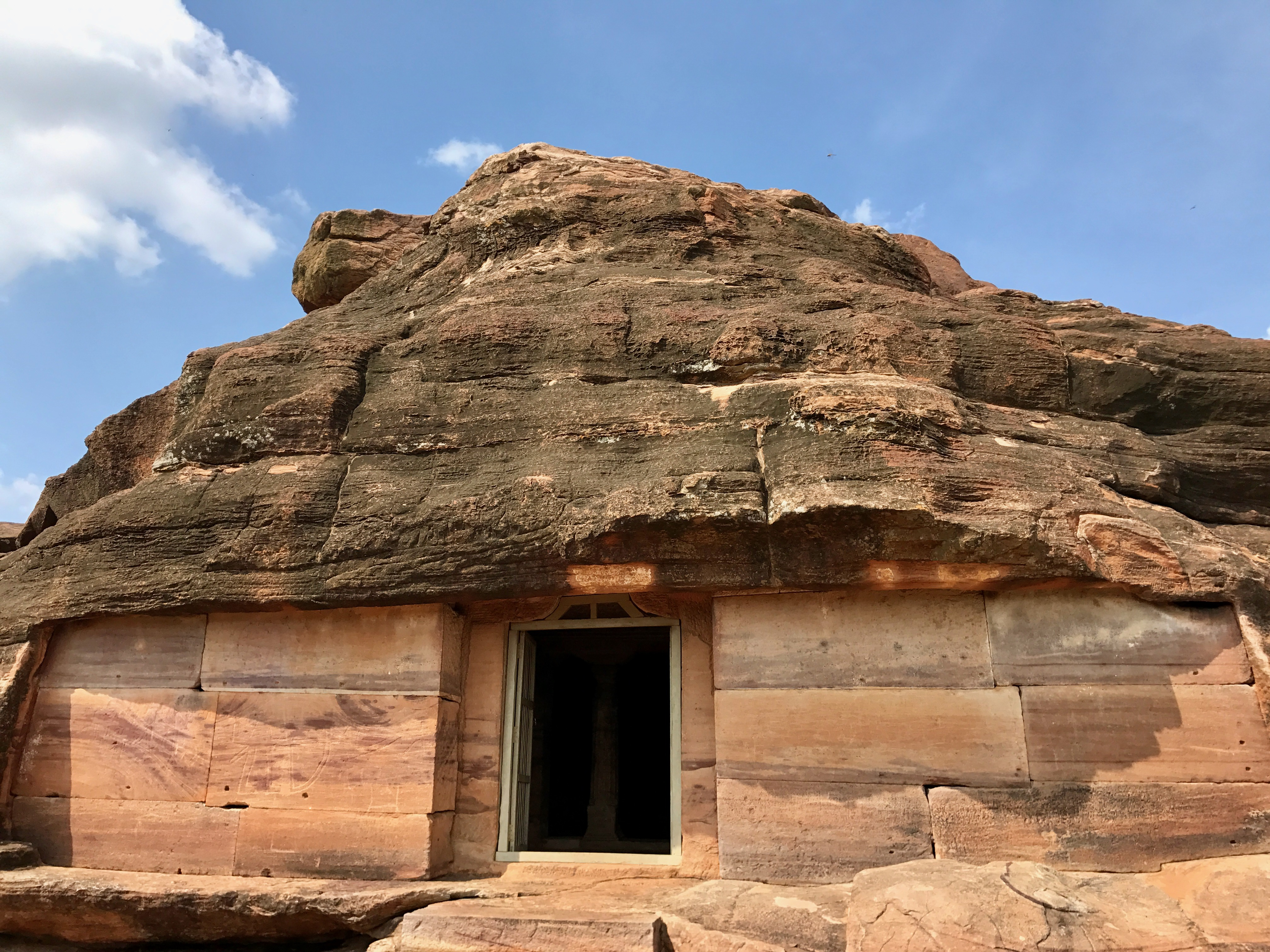
- Meena Basadi

Religion
- Affiliation: Jainism
- Sect: Digambara
- Deity: Mahavira

Location
- Location: Aihole, Bagalkot
- Interactive map of Meena Basadi
- Coordinates: 16°00′48.8″N 75°53′09.3″E

Architecture
- Type: Rock-cut
- Style: Early Chalukya architecture
- Established: 6th–7th century

Aihole Jain cave, also known as Meena Basti and Meena Basadi, is a Jain rock-cut cave temple located on Meguti Hill at Aihole of Bagalkot district in the state of Karnataka, India.

The cave contains a pillared verandah, a mandapa (hall), side chambers and a shrine, decorated with Jain sculptures and extensively carved ceiling. Its principal deity of the temple is Mahavira, the 24th Tirthankara.

== Location ==
Mena Basti is located on the southern side of Meguti Hill at Aihole. The cave temple is prescribed as one of the principal monument of the Aihole group included in India's UNESCO Tentative List.

Aihole complex of Hindu and Buddhist monuments and Jain monuments, primarily associated with the development of Early Chalukyan architecture. The Jain group of monuments include Mena Basti, Meguti Jain temple, Yoginarayana group, Charanthi matha group along with smaller Jain shrines.

== Date ==
The cave dates back to the first half of the 6th century CE, placing it among the early Jain rock-cut monuments of the Deccan. Other architectural treatments associate the cave with the later 6th or 7th century, based on its architectural and sculptural characteristics and its relationship to the development of the Early Chalukyan monuments at Aihole and Badami.

Rocks near the cave bears inscription dated 7th century CE that lists artisans like Srihiriya, Vikramputra, Sriprabhavi, Srikanjanthi, Sripadmaswamy, Madhivya and others associate with this cave.

== Architecture ==
Mena Basti is excavated into the sandstone of Meguti Hill. The cave faces south-west and has a Sukanasa and a large transverse verandah measuring approximately 30 feet (9.1 m) in width and 6.4 feet (2.0 m) in depth. The verandah is supported by four square-section pillars and two pilasters. The pillars are relatively plain and have two-sided capitals. The verandah was originally open at the front but is now enclosed by stone slabs. The arrangement demonstrates the adaptation of architectural forms normally associated with structural temples to a rock-cut setting.

Behind the verandah is a hall with side chambers and a shrine. The arrangement of the cave, particularly the defined vestibular and shrine spaces, has been noted in discussions of the development of temple plans at Aihole. The mandapa has been divided into five bays divided by facade pillars on a ceiling slab. Ardhamandapa features image of Parshvanatha flanked by yakshi and yaksha of left wall and Bahubali flanked by two attendants on right wall. The ceiling feature lotus carvings extending from the center roof. On side roof the ceiling features maithuna and a motif of disgorging warrior timingila symbolizing the flow time. The ceiling also has a carving of a swastika with leaf motifs and lotuses along with makaras, mermaids, fish, geese.

== Sculpture and decoration ==
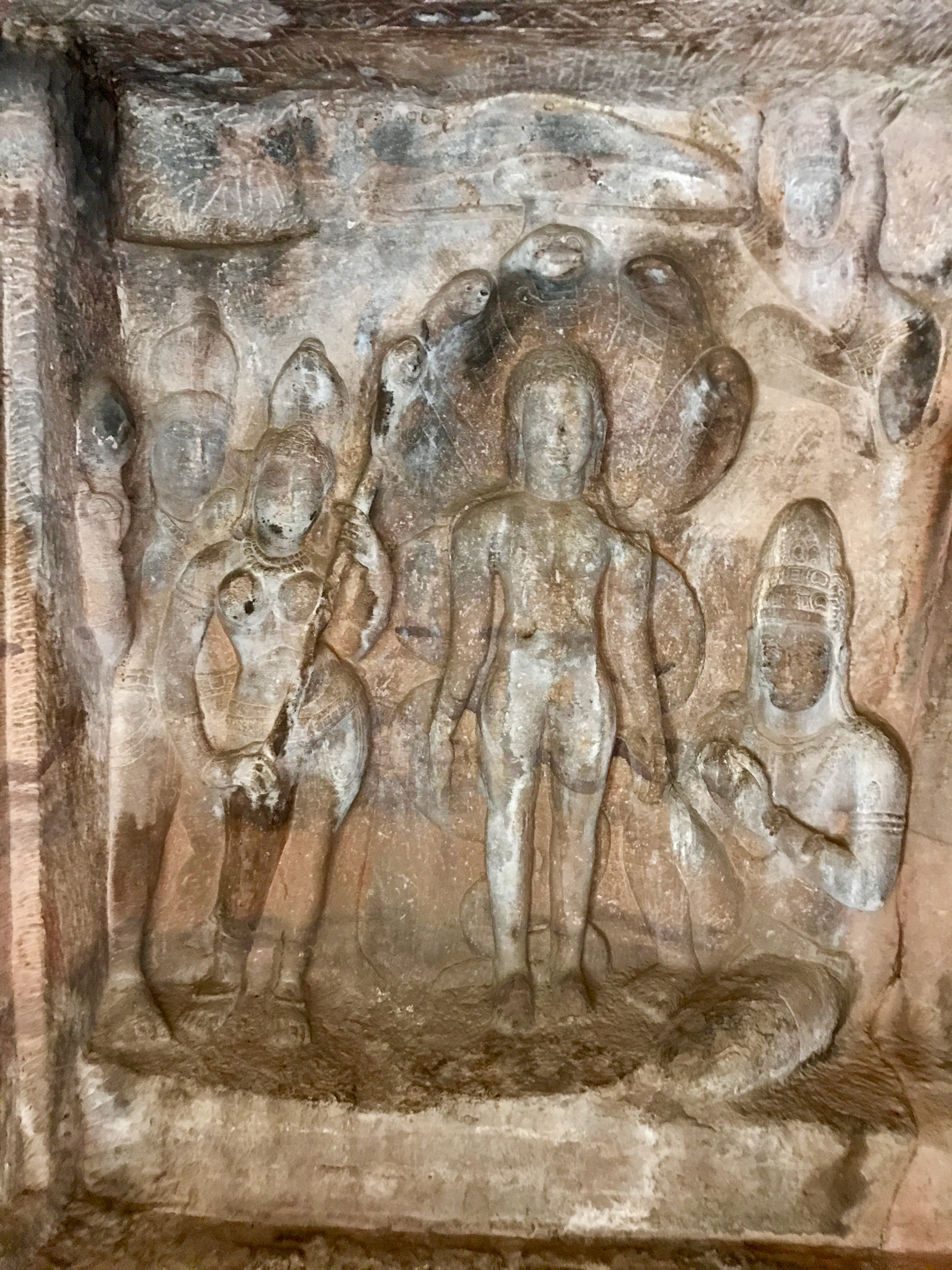
Parshvanatha

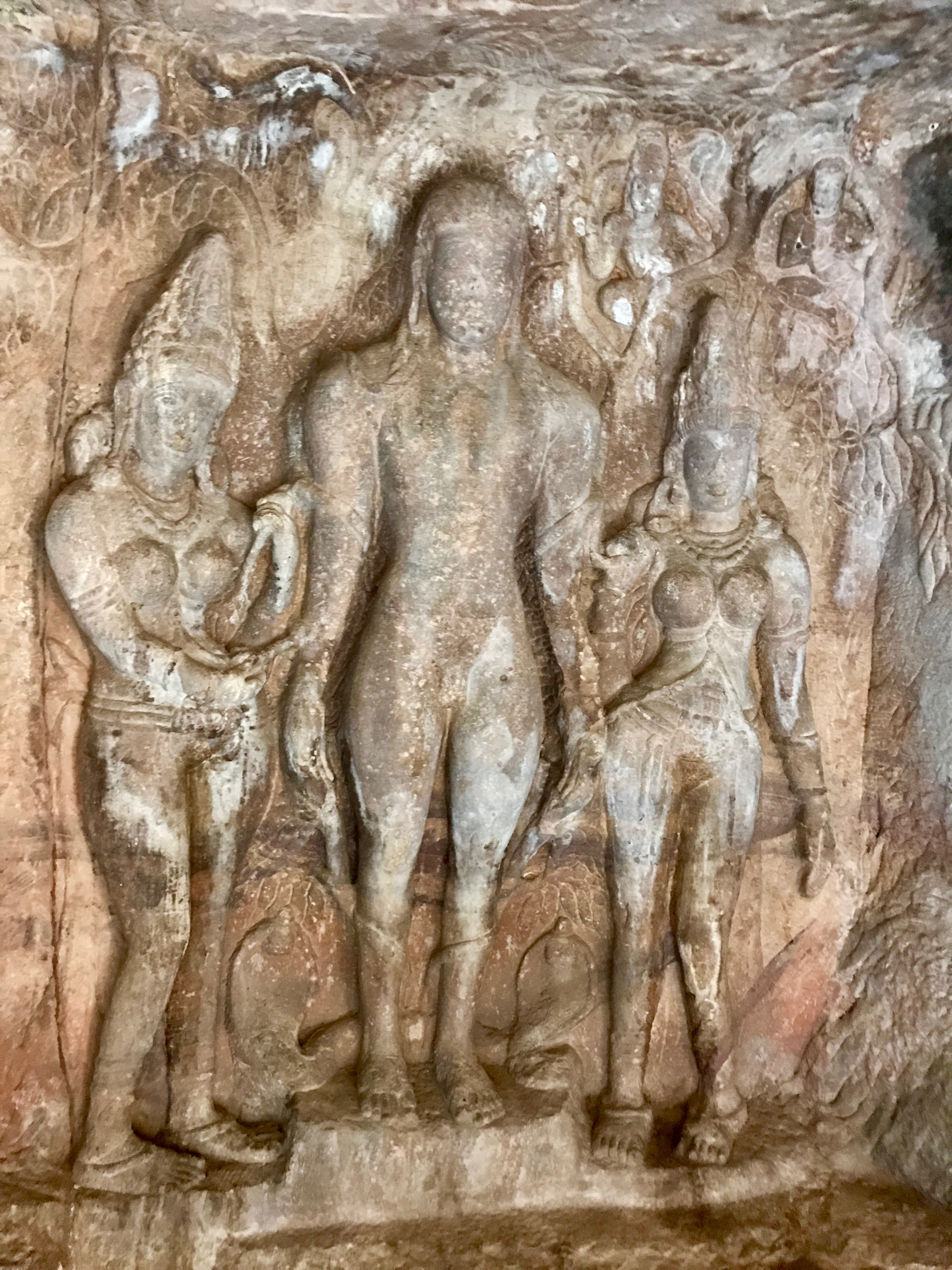
Bahubali

The cave has an extensive sculptural and ornamental carvings. The ceiling of the verandah is carved with geometric and floral motifs, including swastika designs and lotus decoration. Other decorative elements include makara motifs and figures emerging from makara mouths. The ceiling decoration continues into the interior of the cave. The main hall has a large central lotus composition together with additional ornamental motifs. The combination of floral, geometric and animal imagery is characteristic of the experimentation with architectural ornament seen in the monuments of Aihole.

=== Jain imagery ===
The principal sculptural images are Jain. A 7.5 feet (2.3 m) relief of Parshvanatha is carved at one end of the verandah. The Tirthankara is represented beneath the canopy of a five-hooded serpent, the principal iconographic attribute by which Parshvanatha is identified in Jain art. The carving features scene of Kamath in an attempt to obstruct Pārśvanātha from achieving Kevala Jnana whilst Dharanendra held a canopy of thousand hoods over his head and the goddess Padmavati coiled herself around his body to protect Pārśvanātha. At the opposite end is a representation of Bahubali in the kayotsarga posture wearing the jaṭā hair hanging over his shoulders. The statue is accompanied by Brahmi and Sundari. The figure is shown in meditation with vegetation associated and four snakes with the traditional account of his prolonged ascetic practice.

The interior contains further Jain images. The principal shrine contains a statue of Mahavira is lotus position seated on a lion throne with chauri-bearer, Sardula and makara's head on both sides with Chatravali above. The sculpture are carved on inner pillars and walls.

These sculptures, together with the architectural arrangement of the cave, establish its character as a Jain religious monument.

== Architectural significance ==
Mena Basti is significant for the history of Jain architecture because it represents an early Jain adaptation of the rock-cut architectural tradition in the Deccan. Its combination of a pillared verandah, hall, subsidiary chambers and shrine demonstrates the increasing complexity of Jain cave architecture during the Early Chalukyan period. Its plan is also significant in the architectural history of Aihole. UNESCO's description of the Aihole-Badami-Pattadakal group identifies Mena Basadi as an important example in the evolution of temple architecture, particularly because of its more clearly defined vestibular arrangement.

The cave forms part of the broader architectural development represented at Aihole, where rock-cut experiments and structural temples existed alongside one another. The architectural experimentation at Aihole subsequently contributed to the mature forms represented at Pattadakal.

== Jainism at Aihole ==
Mena Basti is one of several Jain monuments at Aihole. The nearby Meguti Jain temple is a structural temple situated on the summit of Meguti Hill and is associated with the famous Sanskrit inscription of Ravikirti, dated to 634 CE. Other Jain remains occur elsewhere in the Aihole settlement. The presence of both rock-cut and structural Jain monuments at Aihole illustrates the participation of Jain religious communities in the architectural development of the Early Chalukyan period. The Mena Basti cave is particularly important because it represents the rock-cut component of this architectural tradition.

== Conservation ==
Mena Basti has been under archaeological protection. An Archaeological Survey of India conservation report records work carried out at Aihole in which a drain was excavated in the rock floor of the Jain cave known as Mena-Basti to prevent water from accumulating inside the cave.

The Government of India lists the monument as Jaina Cave (Mena Basti) at Aihole in Bagalkot district.

== See also ==
- Aihole
- Meguti Jain temple
- Badami cave temples
- Jain Narayana Temple, Pattadakal
- Aihole inscription
