= Qarxun, Nakhchivan =

Qarxun
- Municipality
- Location within Azerbaijan
- Coordinates: 39°32′47″N 45°00′31″E
- Country: Azerbaijan
- Autonomous republic: Nakhchivan
- District: Sharur

Population (2005)
  - Total: 1,924
- Time zone: UTC+4 (AZT)

Qarxun (also, Karkhun) is a village and municipality in the Sharur District of Nakhchivan, Azerbaijan. It is located near the Sharur-Nakhchivan highway, 3 km from the district center, on the right bank of the Arpachay River, on the plain. Its population mainly engages in growing grains and vegetables, and animal husbandry. There are the iron - concrete products and gravel separating factories, secondary school, cultural house, kindergarten and a hospital in the village. It has a population of 1,924.

== Etymology ==
The name is related with the name of an ancient Turkic tribe karkun. First time the Fazlullah Rashidaddin (13th century) has reported about this tribe. Abulghazi Khan (16th century) noted that the karkınlar (karkyns) are tribes of one of the grandsons of Oghuz Khan's third son Yulduz Khan. It mentions that one of the tribes of Qaraqalpaqlar (Karakalpaks) was called Qarkın. There is no doubt in vicinity of this tribe with the same named tribes which settled in the Azerbaijan. Karkınlar within Oghuz tribes have been settled in Azerbaijan in the 1030s–1040s and were mixed with local tribes. There also exist the same named villages in territory of Dagestan, Armenia, Turkmenistan and Uzbekistan. Some researchers says that the Garkhun tribes are related with the black Huns.
