= Jai Jinendra =

Jain greeting

Jai Jinendra (Sanskrit: जय जिनेन्द्र, romanized: Jaya Jinēndra) is a common greeting used by the Jains. The phrase means "Victory to the Lord of the Jinas (Tirthankaras)"

== Etymology ==
The phrase is a combination of two Sanskrit words: Jaya and Jinendra. Jaya translates to victory, while Jinendra is a compound word derived from the words Jina, referring to a human being who has conquered inner passions and possesses kevala jnana (omiscience), and Indra, which means chief or lord.

== Meguti Aihole Jain Inscription ==
A slab on the outer east side wall of the Jain Meguti temple is inscribed in the Sanskrit language and the Old Kannada script. It is dated to 634 CE, and is a poem by the Jain poet Ravikirti. He was in the court of king Pulakeshin II. This inscription opens with the words "Jai Jina", the equivalent of the "Jai Jinendra" salutation in Sanskrit. The inscription is a panegyric by the Jain poet wildly praising his patron Pulakesin II.

The first verse reads:-

"Victorious is the holy Jina ─ he who is exempt from old age, death and birth ─ in the sea of whose knowledge the whole world is comprised like an island. And next, long victorious is the immeasurable, wide ocean of the Chalukya family, which is the birth-place of jewels of men that are ornaments of the diadem of the earth."

This 7th-century greeting remains a tradition among contemporary era Jains as "Jai Jinendra".

== See also ==
- God in Jainism
- Mahavira
