= Karkhun, Armenia =

Village in Armavir, Armenia

Karkhun
- Location within Armenia
- Coordinates: 40°05′N 44°15′E
- Country: Armenia
- Marz (Province): Armavir
- Time zone: UTC+4 ( )
  - Summer (DST): UTC+5 ( )

Karkhun is a village in the Armavir Province of Armenia.

== See also ==
- Armavir Province
