= Adur, Bengaluru South =

Adur
- village
- Adur (Bangalore South) is in Bangalore district
- Interactive map of Adur
- Coordinates: 12.7382°N 77.6527°E
- Country: India
- State: Karnataka
- District: Bangalore Urban
- Talukas: Bangalore South

Government
  - Body: Village Panchayat

Languages
  - Official: Kannada
- Time zone: UTC+5:30 (IST)
- Nearest city: Bangalore
- Civic agency: Village Panchayat

Adur (Bangalore South) is a village in the southern state of Karnataka, India. It is located in the Bangalore South taluk of Bangalore district.
