= Adur, Anekal =

Adur
- village
- Adur (Anekal) is in Bangalore district
- Country: India
- State: Karnataka
- District: Bangalore
- Talukas: Anekal

Government
  - Body: Village Panchayat

Languages
  - Official: Kannada
- Time zone: UTC+5:30 (IST)
- PIN: 562 106
- Nearest city: Bangalore
- Civic agency: Village Panchayat

Adur (Anekal) is a village in the southern state of Karnataka, India. It is located in the Anekal taluk of Bangalore district in Karnataka.

== Demographics ==
As of 2011 India census, Adur had a population of 717. Males constitute 368 of the population and females 349. Kannada is the official and most widely spoken language in Adur. Adur has an average literacy rate of 66.11 percent, higher than the national average of 59.5 percent, with 77.17 percent of the males and 54.44 percent of females literate.
