= Adoor (Yelbarga) =

- village
- Interactive map of Adoor
- Coordinates: 15.5355°N 75.9667°E
- Country: India
- State: Karnataka
- District: Koppal
- Talukas: Yelbarga

Government
  - Body: Village Panchayat

Languages
  - Official: Kannada
- Time zone: UTC+5:30 (IST)
- Nearest city: Koppal
- Civic agency: Village Panchayat

Adoor is a village in the southern state of Karnataka, India. It is located in the Yelbarga taluk of Koppal district in Karnataka.

== See also ==
- Koppal
- Districts of Karnataka
