= Jain Narayana Temple =

9th-century Jain temple at Pattadakal, Karnataka, India

- ಜೈನ ನಾರಾಯಣ ದೇವಾಲಯ
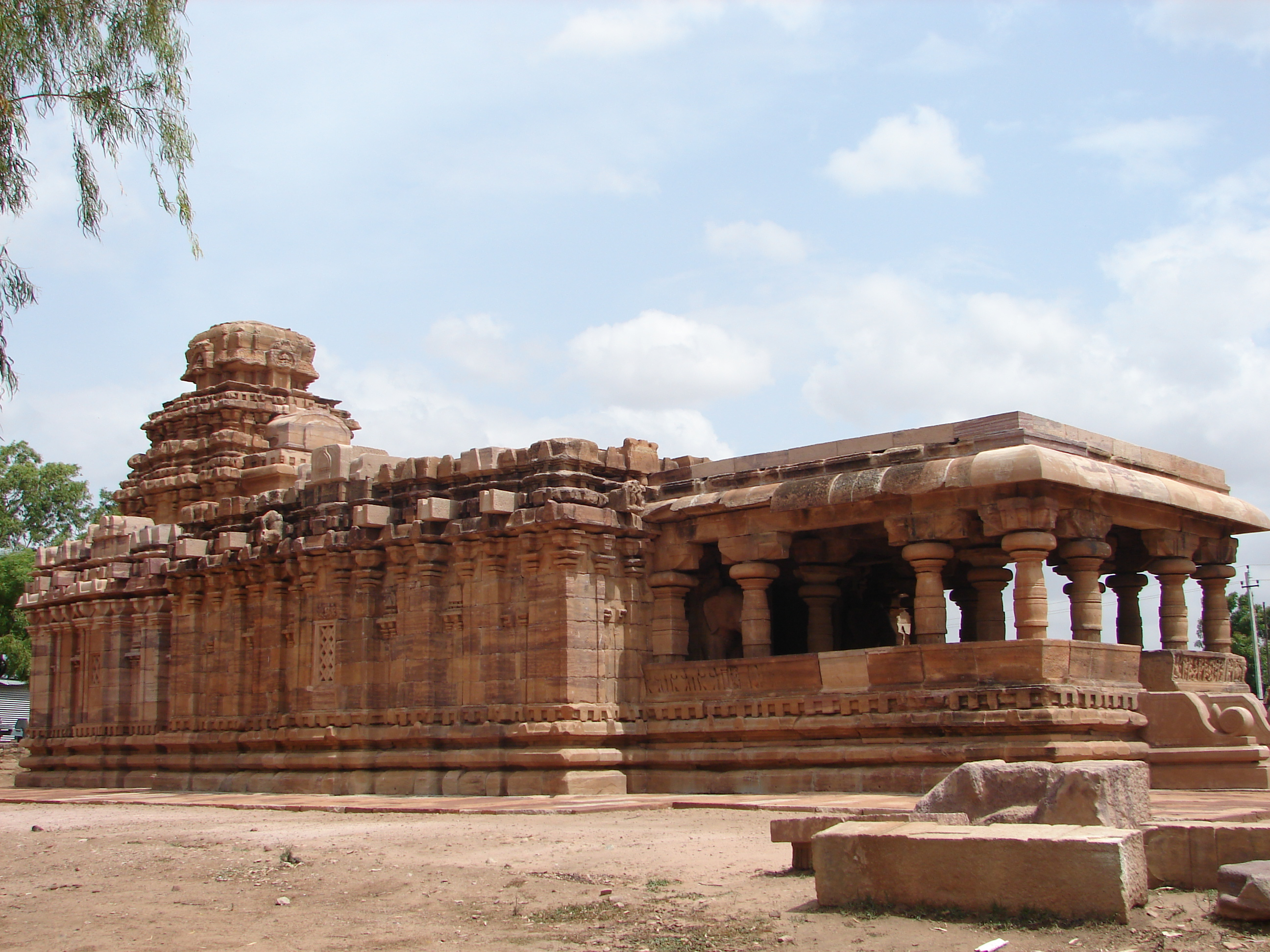
- Jain Narayana Temple

Religion
- Affiliation: Jainism
- Sect: Digambara
- Deity: Parshvanatha

Location
- Location: Pattadakal, Bagalkot district
- Interactive map of Jain Narayana Temple
- Coordinates: 15°56′59″N 75°48′29″E

Architecture
- Style: Dravidian architecture
- Creator: Krishna II
- Established: 9th century CE

UNESCO World Heritage Site
- Official name: Group of Monuments at Pattadakal
- Type: Cultural
- Criteria: iii, iv
- Designated: 1987 (11th session)
- Reference no.: 239
- Region: Asia-Pacific

Jain Narayana Temple is a Jain temple at Pattadakal in the state of Karnataka, India. It is located separate from the principal group of temples at Pattadakal. The temple was constructed in 9th century CE during the reign of Krishna II, Rashtrakuta dynasty.

The temple is predominantly follows Dravidian architecture with plan consists of a square sanctum surrounded by a circumambulatory passage, an antarala, a hall and a large entrance porch.

== History ==
The temple was constructed in 9th century CE during the reign of Krishna II, Rashtrakuta dynasty. Adam Hardy explains the temple as an example of the transformation from Badami Chalukya architecture to Dravidian architecture.

Based on earlier descriptions the temple was from Rashtrakuta period during the reign of either Amoghavarsha I or Krishna II. The Jain temple represents a later phase of religious and architectural activity at Pattadakal, following the principal Badami Chalukya architecture. Its construction demonstrates the site receiving patronage from Rashtrakuta period.

== Architecture ==
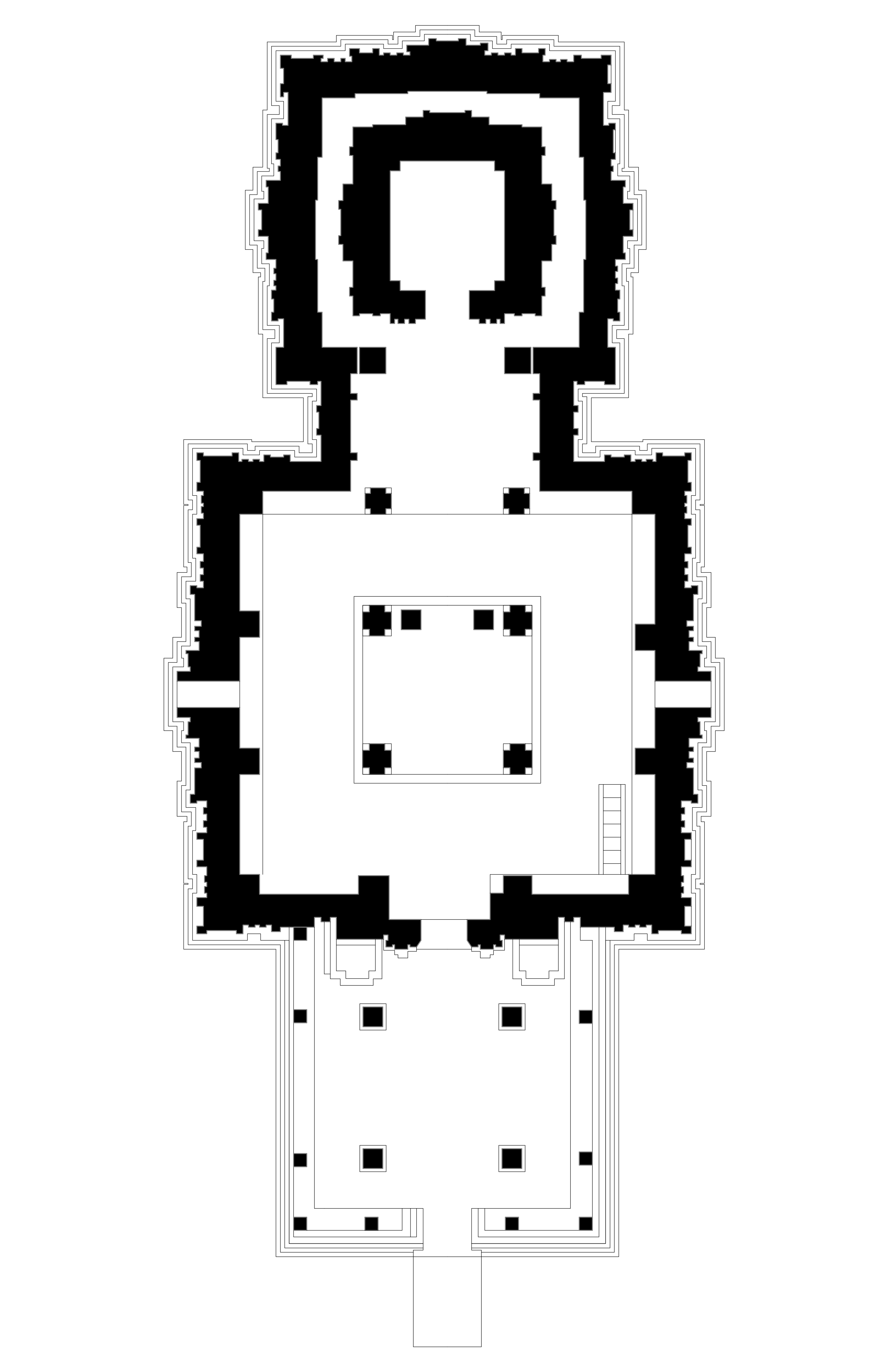
Floor plan of Jain Narayana Temple

The temple consists of large porch, a hall and a sanctuary surrounded by an ambulatory. The principal plan consists of a square garbhagriha, pradakshinapatha, antarala, mandapa and mukhamandapa. The adhisthana consists of a series of mouldings arranged into projections. The sanctum walls feature bhadra projections and slender pilasters, while the hall is divided into a series of bays. Compared with the more extensively sculptured Early Chalukya temples in the main Pattadakal group, the architectural treatment is relatively restrained.

According to Adam Hardy, the temple reflects the architectural developments of the Rashtrakuta period at Pattadakal and Aihole, which marked a transition between the Early Chalukyan monuments and the later Chalukya architecture of Karnataka. He places the monument within this broader development, particularly in terms of changes in the treatment of temple walls, superstructures, and subsidiary architectural elements. Hardy also notes the architectural treatment of the Jain temple's wall niches, suggesting that they may originally have housed images.

The shrine features sāndhāra vimāna, with an upper story preserved above the principal shrine with sanctuary above the ground-floor shrine and compares the arrangement with Jain temples at Hallur, Lakkundi and Shravanabelagola.

The adhisthana consists of three main mouldings and is divided into bhadra, pratibhadra and karna sections. The sanctum walls feature slightly projecting bhadras, separated by slender Brahmakanta pilasters. Above the walls is a kapota, without the additional kantha and subsidiary mouldings seen in some contemporary temples.

The walls of the gūḍhamandapa are divided into seven sections on both the north and south, with the projecting bhadra sections further articulated by subhadra and pratibhadra elements. The vimāna is sāndhāra, with a pradakshinapath, and its upper story remains largely intact. The temple was expanded to include mukhamandapa during later phase.

Temple features lathe-turned sandstone pillars that are important part of Deccan temple architecture. The temple illustrates the interaction between earlier Chalukyan traditions, Rashtrakuta-period architecture features.

Jain Narayana temple is important for the study of the later architectural development of Pattadakal. The Jain temple dates to the Rashtrakuta period unlike the remaining temples from Pattadakal group that dates back to Early Chalukya period. The temple's sāndhāra plan and surviving upper shrine are particularly significant architecture element in the Deccan. The architectural resemble Jain temple at Hallur with both employing a sāndhāra vimāna with an upper storey, and adhisthāna.

== Sculpture ==
The temple features less extensive sculptures compared to other temples in Pattadakal group; however, features ornament carvings of pūrṇaghaṭas, nidhis, vyālas and dancers. The porch is supported by rows of stone lathe-turned pillars with kakṣāsana decorated with relief sculpture. Outside the temple hall their sculptures of large elephant with riders flanked.

The wall niches between the sections of the northern and southern walls contain Jain imagery. The doorways are elaborately moulded, with the hall doorway featuring multiple decorative bands, while the entrance to the sanctum is framed by carved members and makara ended elements.

The principal sanctum now contains a linga, indicating conversion to Vīraśaivism..

== Jain character ==
A small Tirthankara image carved on the northern side provides evidence of its Jain affiliation. Architecturally, the temple features circumambulatory shrine, upper sanctuary and monumental porch demonstrate the integration of Jain architecture with regional traditions.

There are archaeological evidence for earlier Jain activity at the site. Excavations revealed remains of a large brick-built temple and a standing Tirthankara image in sama-bhanga. The remains of Jain temple dates around the Early Chalukya period.

== Conservation ==
The Jain Narayana Temple is protected as part of the Pattadakal monuments under the Archaeological Survey of India. The principal shrine, hall, porch and upper sanctuary preserves illustration the primary feature of its architectural design. Group of Monuments at Pattadakal, including its Jain temple inscribed on the UNESCO World Heritage List in 1987.

== See also ==
- Meguti Jain temple
- Aihole Jain cave
- Group of Monuments at Pattadakal
