= Adoor Palam =

Village in Kerala, India

Adoor Palam is a village near Kadachira, in Kannur District, India.
