= Ravikirti =

7th-century Jain monk, India

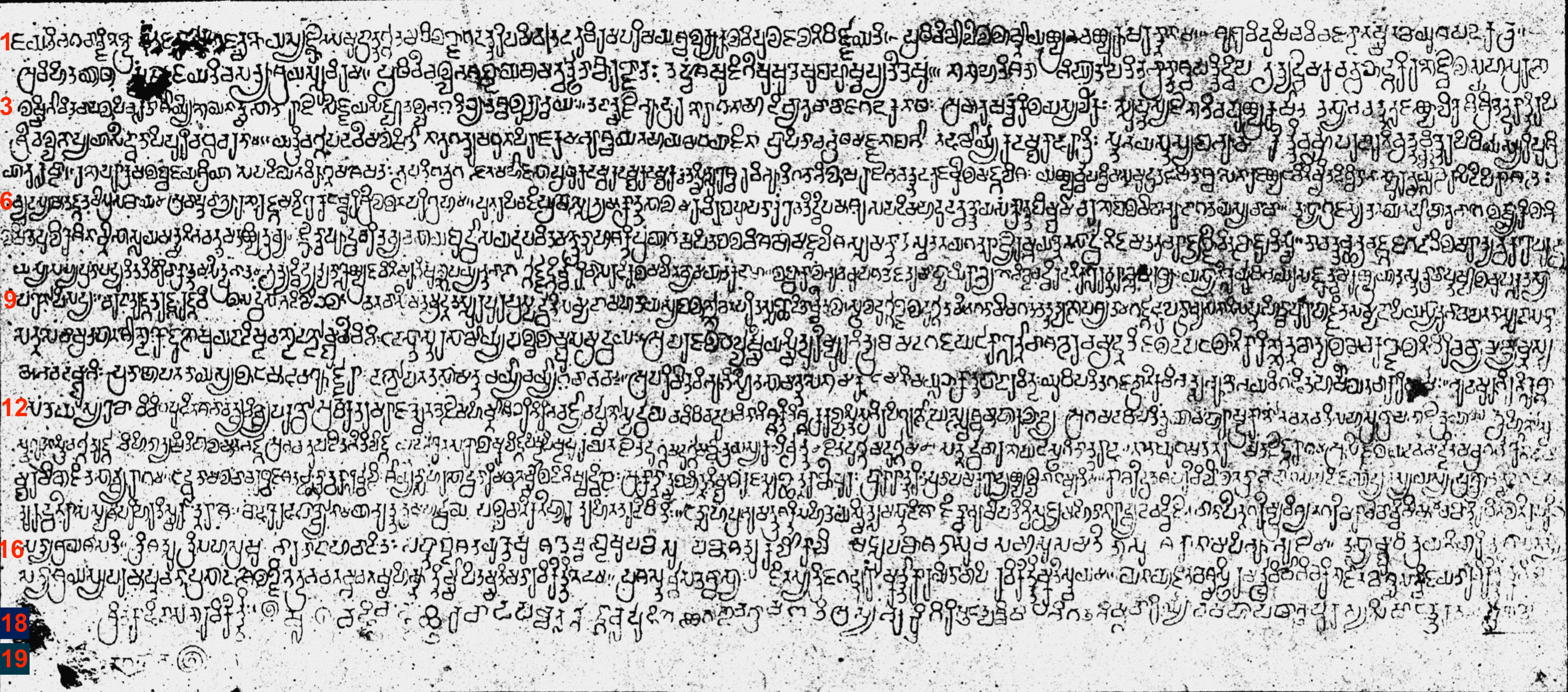
- Ravikirti's inscription, Meguti Jain Basadi, Aihole
- Born: Ravikirti (6-7th Century)
- Occupations: Poet, Scholar,and Jain monk
- Known for: Ravikirti is known for composing the famous Aihole inscription, which celebrates Pulakeshin II's military achievements.
- Notable work: Aihole inscription

Ravikirti was a 7th-century Jain monk, poet, scholar, and epigraphist active in the Deccan region of India. He served in the court of Immadi Pulakeshi (Pulakeshin II), the Chalukya emperor of Vatapi (Badami), and is regarded as his spiritual guru. He is best known for composing the notable Aihole inscription at the Meguti Jain temple, Aihole, which celebrates Pulakeshin II's military achievements.

== Biography ==
Little is known about Ravikirti's personal life, but epigraphic evidence suggests he was a Jain monk (or at least a Jain scholar) and a court poet and spiritual guru of Pulakeshin II of the Chalukya dynasty of Vatapi. His title Kavi (poet) appears in the Aihole inscription where he describes himself in highly Sanskritic-language, praising his own literary skill.

Many historians consider Ravikirti to have been a Jain, based on the religious affiliations of many court poets of the Deccan at the time and the internal evidence of his praise for Jain ideals of learning. The Chalukya courts were known for their Jain patronage, and Jain monks and poets often composed royal inscriptions.

== Literary style ==
Ravikirti's composition in the Aihole inscription is regarded as one of the finest examples of Sanskrit epigraphic-poetry in early medieval India. The inscription is written in an elaborate Sanskrit kāvya-style, with intricate metaphors and courtly praise, while also serving as a record of historical events. Scholars note its careful balance of historical record and literary artistry. The Aihole inscription, dated to 634–635 CE, remains one of the most important sources for early Chalukya history and very early Deccan literary culture. It is praised for its artistic Sanskrit composition and serves as evidence of the level of literary culture at the Chalukya court.

== Inscription ==
The nineteen lines of the inscription has been variously translated. The translation published by Kielhorn is as follows:

Aihole inscription
Verses	Translation (Franz Kielhorn)	Notes
V1–2	Victorious is the holy Jinendra ─ he who is exempt from old age, death and birth ─ in the sea of whose knowledge the whole world is comprised like an island. And next, long victorious is the immeasurable, wide ocean of the Chalukya family, which is the birth-place of jewels of men that are ornaments of the diadem of the earth.	This 7th-century greeting remains a tradition among contemporary era Jains as "Jai Jinendra".
V3–4	And victorious for very long is Satyasraya, who in bestowing gifts and honors on the brave and on the learned, both together on either, observes not the rule of correspondency of number. When many members of that race, bent on conquest, applied to whom the title of Favourite of the Earth had at last become appropriate, had passed away,	This acknowledgment of gifts and honors from the patron being praised is a key part of a prashasti such as the Aihole inscription. The "rule of correspondency" is a reference to Panini's 1.3.10, which refers to the ancient Indian tradition where the brave were given gifts by the king, while the learned were given honors. Further, the poet calls his patron Satyasraya (ocean of truth).
V5–6	There was, of the Chalukya lineage, the king named Jayasimha-vallabha, who in battle ─ where horses, foot soldiers and elephants, bewildered, fell down under the strokes of many hundreds of weapons, and where thousands of frightful headless trunks and of flashes of rays of swords were leaping to and fro─ by his bravery made Fortune his own, even though she is suspected of fickleness.	The poet is tracing his patron's lineage, with poetic praise and exaggerated claims of thousands of elephants killed in wars by one of his ancestors.
V7–8	His son was he who was named Raṇarâga, of divine dignity, the one master of the world, whose superhuman nature, (even) when he was asleep, people knew from the pre-eminence of his form. His son was Polekêśin, who, though endowed with the moon’s Beauty, and though the favourite of Fortune, became the bridegroom of Vatapipuri. Whose path in the pursuit of the three objects of life the kings on earth even now are unable to follow; and bathed by whom with the water of the purificatory rite, when he performed the horse-sacrifice, the earth beamed with brightness.	Polekesin is dubbed as Pulakesin II in modern literature; while the city of Vatapipuri is now called Badami. The three objects of life are dharma, artha and kama, per Hindu texts. The horse-sacrifice (ashvamedha) is a Vedic ritual; this and other inscriptions of this era – such as the Mahakuta Pillar inscription – repeatedly affirm that the Badami Chalukyas cherished Vedic practices and were a Hindu dynasty. This acknowledgment from a Jain poet makes it notable.
V9–10	His son was Kîrtivarman, the night of doom to the Naḷas, Mauryas and Kadambas, whose mind, although his thoughts kept aloof from others’ wives, was attracted by the Fortune of his adversary. Who, having secured the fortune of victory by his valour in war, being a scent-elephant of a king, of great strength, at once completely broke down the multitude of the broad kadamba trees ─ the Kadambas.	The Kadambas referred to here are the same as the Karnataka dynasty discussed in the Talagunda pillar inscription.
V11–12	When his desire was bent on the dominion of the lord of the gods, his younger brother Maṅgalêśa became king, who by the sheets of dust of his army of horse, encamped on the shores of the eastern and western seas, stretched an awning over the quarters. Who in that house which was the battle-field, took in marriage the damsel, the Fortune of the Kaṭachchuris, having scattered the gathering gloom, the array of elephants, with hundreds of bright-rayed lamps, the swords.	This is the same Mangalesha who helped build the Cave 3 (Vishnu) and Cave 4 (Jain) in Badami, and who is mentioned in the Cave 3 inscription and described in the Mahakuta Pillar inscription.
V13–14	And again, when he was desirous of taking the island of Rêvatî, his great army with many bright banners, which had ascended the ramparts, as it was reflected in the water of the sea appeared like Varuṇa’s forces, quickly come there at once at his word (of command). When his elder brother’s son, named Polekêśin, of a dignity like Nahusha’s, was coveted by Fortune, and finding his uncle to be jealous of him thereat, had formed the resolution to wander abroad as an exile,	An example of comparing Pulakesin II era to mythical legends, here to the forces of the sea deity Varuna. It also paints Pulakesin II as not eager for power, as he had resolved to leave Chalukya kingdom, self-exile and wander in far away lands.
V15–16	That Maṅgalêśa, whose great strength became on all sides reduced by the application of the powers of good counsel and energy gathered by him, abandoned, together with the effort to secure the kingdom for his own son, both that no mean kingdom of his and his life. Then, on the subversion of that rule encompassed by the darkness of enemies, the whole world grew light again, invaded as it were by the lustrous rays of His irresistible splendor. Or when was it that the sky ceased to be black like a swarm of bees with thundering clouds, in which flashes of lightning were dancing like banners, and the edges of which were crushed in the rushing wind?	These verses are the primary source for the war of succession between Mangalesha and his nephew Pulakesin II. It also claims that neighboring kingdoms saw this war as an opportunity to seize parts of the Chalukya kingdom, all to be defeated by Pulakesin II.
V17–18	When, having found the opportunity, he who was named Âppâyika, and Gôvinda approached with their troops of elephants to conquer the country north of the Bhaimarathî, the one in battle through His armies came to know the taste of fear, while the other at once received the reward of the services rendered by him. When He was besieging Vanavâsî, which for a girdle has the rows of haṁsa birds that sport on the high waves of the Varadâ as their play-place, and which by its wealth rivaled the city of the gods, that fortress on land, having the surface of the earth all around covered with the great sea of his army, to the looker-on seemed at once converted into a fortress in the water.	Bhaimarathi is same as river Bhimarathi
V19–20	Although in former days they had acquired happiness by renouncing the seven sins, the Gaṅga and Âḷupa lords, being subdued by his dignity, were always intoxicated by drinking the nectar of close attendance upon him. In the Koṅkaṇas the impetuous waves of the forces directed by Him speedily swept away the rising wavelets of pools ─ the Mauryas.	the poet paints the other kings as weak by first showing that they had renounced sins but then they fell into them again, in contrast to Pulakesin II's character and strengths.
V21–22	When, radiant like the destroyer of Pura, he besieged Purî, the Fortune of the western sea, with hundreds of ships in appearance like arrays of rutting elephants, the sky, dark-blue as a young lotus and covered with tiers of massive clouds, resembled the sea, and the sea was like the sky. Subdued by His splendor, the Lâṭas, Mâḷavas and Gûrjaras became as it were teachers of how feudatories, subdued by force, ought to behave.	the poet alludes to Shiva with "destroyer of Pura", and compares Pulakesin II to Shiva; the Puri mentioned here is not the one in Odisha, but on coast of Maharashtra; the poetic comparisons here and nearby verses borrow from Kalidasa's fictional works.
V23–24	Harsha, whose lotus-feet were arrayed with the rays of the jewels of the diadems of hosts of feudatories prosperous with unmeasured might, through Him had his mirth (harsha) melted away by fear, having become loathsome with his rows of lordly elephants fallen in battle. While He was ruling the earth with his broad armies, the neighbourhood of the Vindhya, by no means destitute of the lustre of the many sandbanks of the Rêvâ, shone even more brightly by his great personal splendor, having to be avoided by his elephants because, as it seemed, they by their bulk rivaled the mountains.	The poet exaggerates by claiming the elephants in Pulakesin's army rivaled and exceeded the size of Vindhya mountains, when the Vindhya hills are impassable to them and military conquests typically avoided this region. This and nearby verses borrow many phrases and allusions from classic Sanskrit poetry on Hindu legends, these were composed long before Ravikirti.
V25–26	Almost equal to Indra, He by means of all the three powers, gathered by him according to rule, and by his noble birth and other excellent qualities, acquired the sovereignty over the three Mahârâshṭrakas with their nine and ninety thousand villages. Through the excellencies of their householders prominent in the pursuit of the three objects of life, and having broken the pride of other rulers of the earth, the Kaliṅgas with the Kôsalas by His army were made to evince signs of fear.	Fleet interpreted Indra as the deity, also called Sakra, a poetic flourish to praise and compare Pulakeshin to the king of gods. Indra here has also been interpreted as a Rashtrakuta king, but a subject of many disputes. These verses are one of the earliest mention of a region named "Maharashtra", now a state north of Aihole.
V27–28	Hard pressed (pishṭa) by him, Pishṭapura became a fortress not difficult of access; wonderful (to relate), the ways of the Kali age to him were inaccessible! Ravaged by him, the water of Kunâḷa ─ coloured with the blood of men killed with many weapons, and the land within it overspread with arrays of accoutered elephants ─ was like the cloud-covered sky in which the red evening-twilight has risen.	these verses illustrate how Ravikirti borrowed from Kalidasa's Raghuvamsa; the Kunala here possibly refers to territory near river Godavari, states Kielhorn.
V29–30	With his sixfold forces, the hereditary troops and the rest, who raised spotless chowries, hundreds of flags, umbrellas, and darkness, and who churned the enemy elated with the sentiments of heroism and energy, He caused the splendour of the lord of the Pallavas, who had opposed the rise of his power, to be obscured by the dust of his army, and to vanish behind the walls of Kâñchîpura. When straightway he strove to conquer the Chôḷas, the Kâvêrî, who has the darting carps for her tremulous eyes, had her current obstructed by the causeway formed by his elephants whose rutting-juice was dripping down, and avoided the contact with the ocean.	this and the next verses are notable for the claimed conquest of the Pallavas and they retreating to Kanchipuram, which the poet alleges indirectly brought prosperity to the kingdoms in what are now Tamil Nadu and Kerala.
V31–32	There he caused great prosperity to the Chôḷas, Kêraḷas and Pâṇḍyas, he being the hot-rayed sun to the hoar-frost─ the army of the Pallavas. While he, Satyâśraya, endowed with the powers of energy, mastery and good counsel, ─ having conquered all the quarters, having dismissed the kings full of honours, having done homage to gods and Brâhmaṇs, having entered the city of Vâtâpî─ is ruling, like one city, this earth which has the dark-blue waters of the surging sea for its moat;	Mentions Vatapi as another name for Badami, as well as Pulakesin II giving homage to gods and Brahmans
V33–34	when thirty (and) three thousand and five years besides, joined with seven hundred years, have passed since the Bhârata war; And when fifty (and) six and five hundred years of the Śaka kings also have gone by in Kali age;	Gives two dates of the inscription; the "(and)" is an interpretation of Kielhorn.
V35–37	This stone mansion of Jinêndra, a mansion of every kind of greatness, has been caused to be built by the wise Ravikîrti, who has obtained the highest favour of that Satyâśraya whose rule is bounded by the three oceans. Of this eulogy and of this dwelling of the Jina revered in the three worlds, the wise Ravikîrti himself is the author and also the founder. May that Ravikîrti be victorious, who full of discernment has used the abode of the Jina, firmly built of stone, for a new treatment of his theme, and who thus by his poetic skill has attained to the fame of Kâḷidâsa and of Bhâravi!	Attest that the Meguti temple is a Jain mansion for the Jinas, built by Ravikirti with permission and support of Pulakesin II. The repetitive statements about Tirthankaras affirms this to be a Jain inscription. The poet declares his skill and fame as equal to Kalidasa and Bharavi.
V38–42	(corrupt insertion at a later date)	These lines announce forever grant of lands and the gifts of tax revenue and villages to serve the Jain temple, and that these binding gifts were made by Ravikirti .

== See also ==
- Aihole inscription
- Pulakeshin II
- Chalukya dynasty
- Kannada literature
