= Adur, Azerbaijan =

Adur
- Location within Azerbaijan
- Coordinates: 41°07′32″N 48°17′29″E
- Country: Azerbaijan
- Rayon: Quba
- Municipality: Qarxun

Population (2009)
  - Total: 573
- Time zone: UTC+4 (AZT)
  - Summer (DST): UTC+5 (AZT)

Adur is a village in the Quba Rayon of Azerbaijan. The village population is Tats. The village forms part of the municipality of Qarxun.
