= Qarxun, Quba =

Qarxun
- Municipality
- Location within Azerbaijan
- Coordinates: 41°07′49″N 48°19′41″E
- Country: Azerbaijan
- Rayon: Quba

Population
  - Total: 1,101
- Time zone: UTC+4 (AZT)
  - Summer (DST): UTC+5 (AZT)

Qarxun (also, Karkhuk and Karkhun) is a village and municipality in the Quba Rayon of Azerbaijan. It has a population of 1,101. The municipality consists of the villages of Qarxun and Adur.
