= Adur, Haveri =

Adur
- village
- Location in Karnataka, India Adur (India)
- Coordinates: 14.768°N 75.248°E
- Country: India
- State: Karnataka
- District: Haveri
- Talukas: Hangal

Government
  - Body: Village Panchayat

Languages
  - Official: Kannada
- Time zone: UTC+5:30 (IST)
- Nearest city: Haveri, Akkiāluru
- Civic agency: Village Panchayat

Adur is a village in southern state of Karnataka, India. It is located in the Hangal taluk of Haveri district in Karnataka.

== See also ==
- Haveri
- Districts of Karnataka
