= Aşağı Qarxun =

- Municipality
- Location within Azerbaijan
- Coordinates: 40°35′09″N 47°12′48″E
- Country: Azerbaijan
- Rayon: Yevlakh

Population
  - Total: 1,291
- Time zone: UTC+4 (AZT)
  - Summer (DST): UTC+5 (AZT)

Aşağı Qarxun (also, Ashaga Karkhun, Ashagy Karakhun, and Ashagy-Karkhun) is a village and municipality in the Yevlakh Rayon of Azerbaijan. It has a population of 1,291.
