= Yuxarı Qarxun =

- Municipality
- Location within Azerbaijan
- Coordinates: 40°37′24″N 47°11′23″E
- Country: Azerbaijan
- Rayon: Yevlakh

Population
  - Total: 1,691
- Time zone: UTC+4 (AZT)
  - Summer (DST): UTC+5 (AZT)

Yuxarı Qarxun (also, Yukhary-Karkhun) is a village and municipality in the Yevlakh Rayon of Azerbaijan. It has a population of 1,691.
