= Brihadisvara Temple, Gangaikonda Cholapuram =

Brohadisvara temple is known as Gangaikonda cholapuram

Gangaikonda Cholapuram Brihadisvara Temple
- கங்கைகொண்ட சோழீசுவரர் கோயில்
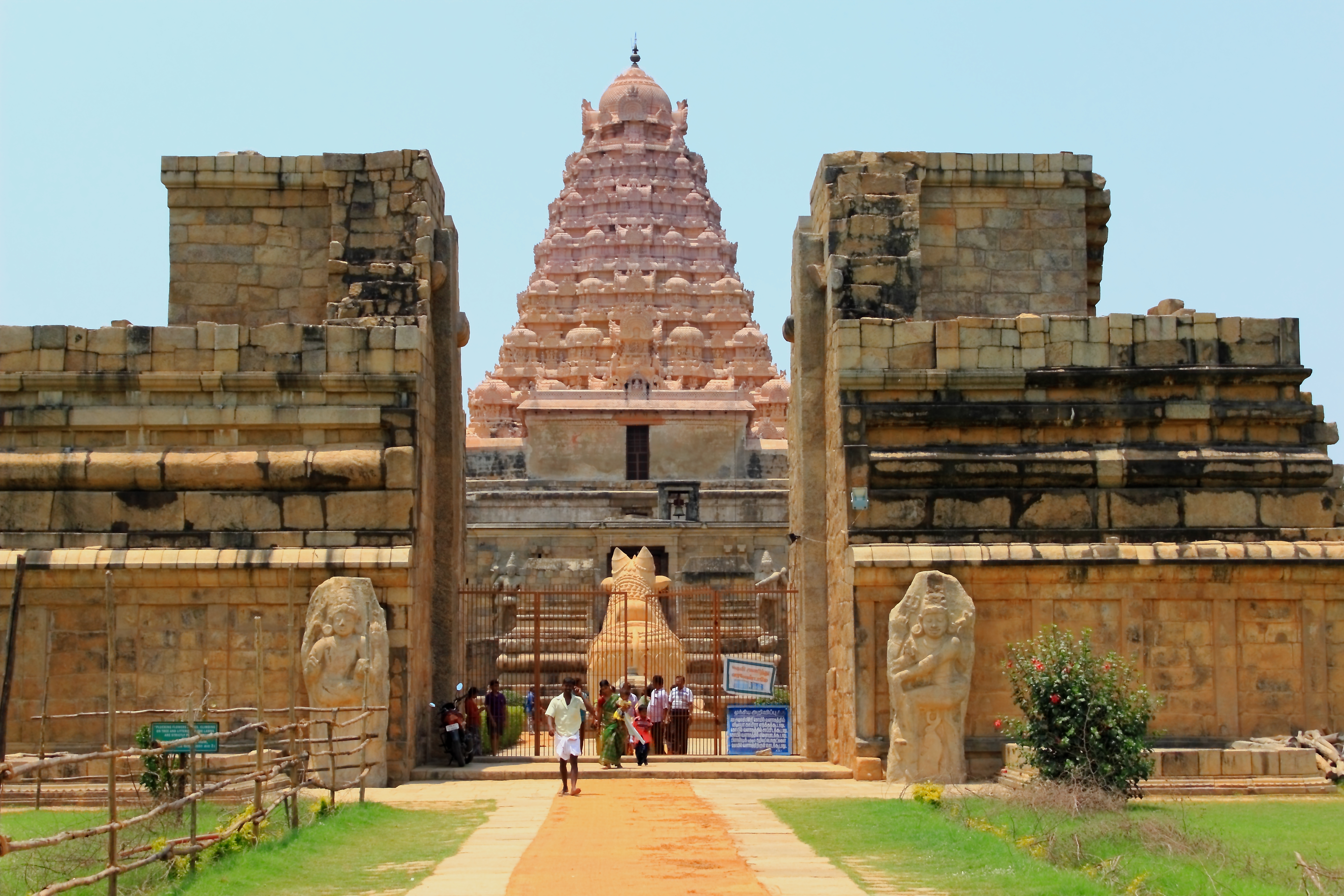
- Gangaikonda Cholapuram Temple

- Location in Tamil Nadu Brihadisvara Temple, Gangaikonda Cholapuram (Tamil Nadu)

Religion
- Affiliation: Hinduism
- District: Ariyalur district
- Deity: Shiva
- Festivals: Maha Shivaratri, Sadhaya vila
- Governing body

Location
- State: Tamil Nadu
- Country: India
- Coordinates: 11°12′22.44″N 79°26′56″E

Architecture
- Type: Chola architecture
- Creator: Rajendra Chola I
- Completed: 11th century CE
- Inscriptions: Tamil

UNESCO World Heritage Site
- Part of: Great Living Chola Temples
- Criteria: Cultural:
- Reference: 250bis
- Inscription: 1987 (11th Session)
- Extensions: 2004

The Brihadisvara Temple is a Hindu temple dedicated to Shiva in Gangaikonda Cholapuram, Jayankondam, in the South Indian state of Tamil Nadu. Completed in 1035 CE by Rajendra Chola I as a part of his new capital, this Chola dynasty era temple is similar in design, and has a similar name, as the older 11th century, Brihadeeswarar Temple about 70 kilometres (43 mi) to the southwest in Thanjavur. The Gangaikonda Cholapuram Temple is smaller yet more refined than the Thanjavur Temple. Both are among the largest Shiva temples in South India and examples of Dravidian style temples. The temple is also referred to in texts as Gangaikonda Cholapuram Temple or Gangaikondacholeeswaram Temple

The main temple dedicated to Shiva is based on a square plan, but it displays other Hindu deities such as Vishnu, Durga, Surya, Harihara, Ardhanarishvara, and others. It opens to the sunrise and its sanctum, as well as the mandapas, are aligned on an east–west axis. In addition to the main shrine, the temple complex has a number of smaller shrines, gopura, and other monuments, with some partially ruined or restored in later centuries. The temple is famed for its bronze sculptures, artwork on its walls, the depiction of Nandi and the scale of its tower. As well as its notability for having been built by Rajendra I, the temple is also noteworthy for its numerous inscriptions, although none of them are his.

Except for this temple, the old city of Gangaikonda Cholapuram – the capital of a powerful Asian empire from around 900 to 1215 or over three centuries along with its other major Chola-era Hindu temples have been completely destroyed, leaving a desolate place. The Gangaikonda Cholapuram temple remains an active temple. Four daily rituals, and many yearly festivals are held there, of which the Shivarathri during the Tamil month of Masi (February–March), Aipassi Pournami during Aipassi (October– November) and Thiruvadirai during Margazhi (December–January) are the most prominent. It is one of the most visited tourist attractions in Tamil Nadu. The Archaeological Survey of India (ASI) administers the temple as a protected heritage monument. UNESCO declared it a World Heritage Site in 2004, along with the Brihadeeswarar Temple at Thanjavur and Airavatesvara temple at Darasuram. These are referred to collectively as the Great Living Chola Temples.

== Location ==
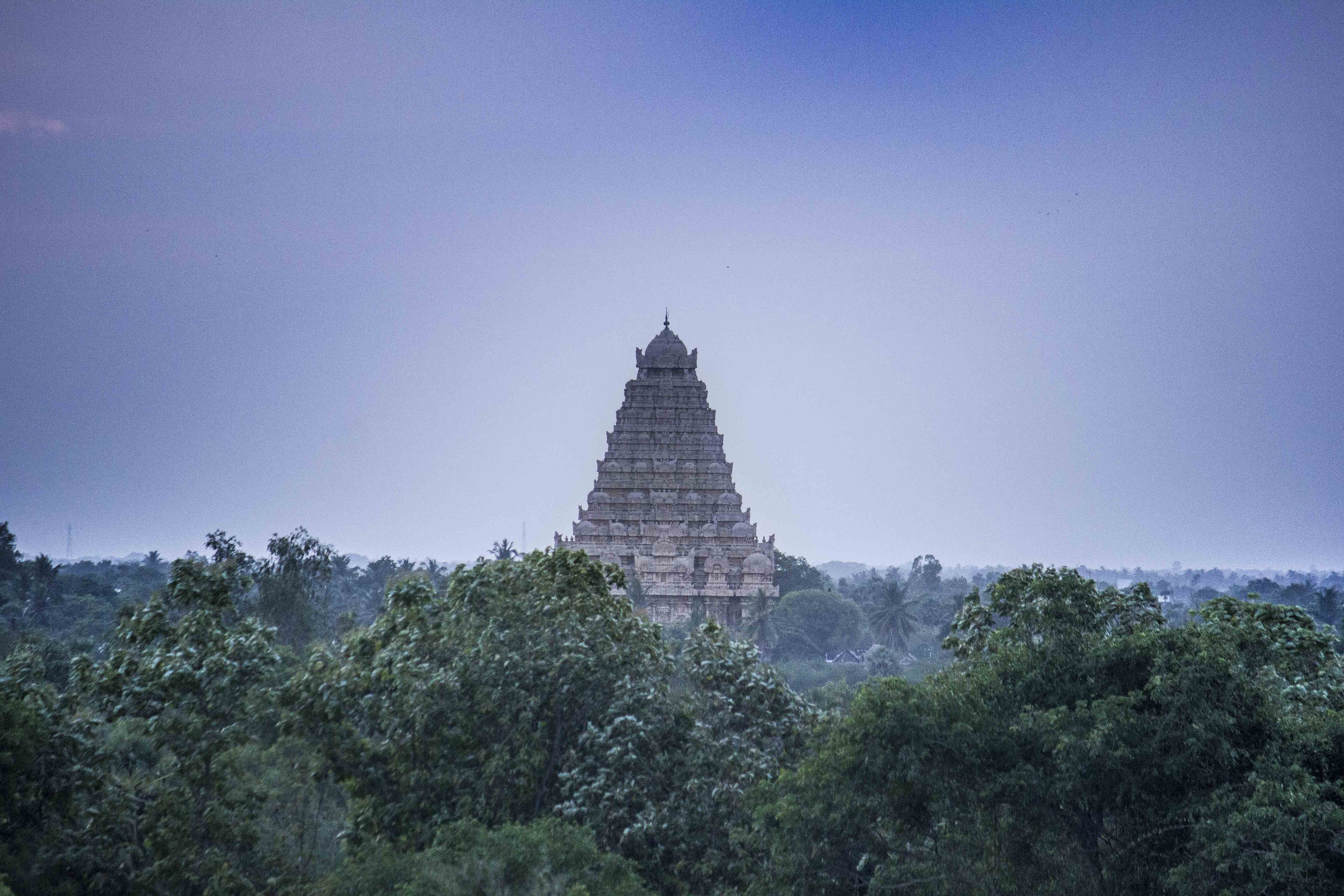
Brihadisvara Temple at Gangaikonda Cholapuram, seen from a distance

The Brihadeeswarar Temple is located near the village of Gangaikonda Cholapuram, about 280 kilometres (170 mi) southwest of Chennai and 50 kilometres (31 mi) from Chidambaram. Roughly 70 kilometres (43 mi) to the northeast is the similarly named Chola dynasty era Brihadeeswarar Temple in Thanjavur, and is about 30 kilometres (19 mi) to the northeast of the Airavatesvara Temple. All three are UNESCO world heritage sites.

The temple is on Highway 81 connecting Tiruchirappalli and Chidambaram. The nearby city of Chidambaram is connected to other major cities by daily trains on the Indian railway network, Tamil Nadu bus services and National Highways 36, 81, and 245. The nearest airport with regular services is Tiruchirappalli International Airport (IATA: TRZ), about 120 kilometres (75 mi) away.

Though inland, the temple is near the Kollidam River, within the Cauveri River delta with access to the Bay of Bengal and through it to the Indian Ocean.

== Description ==
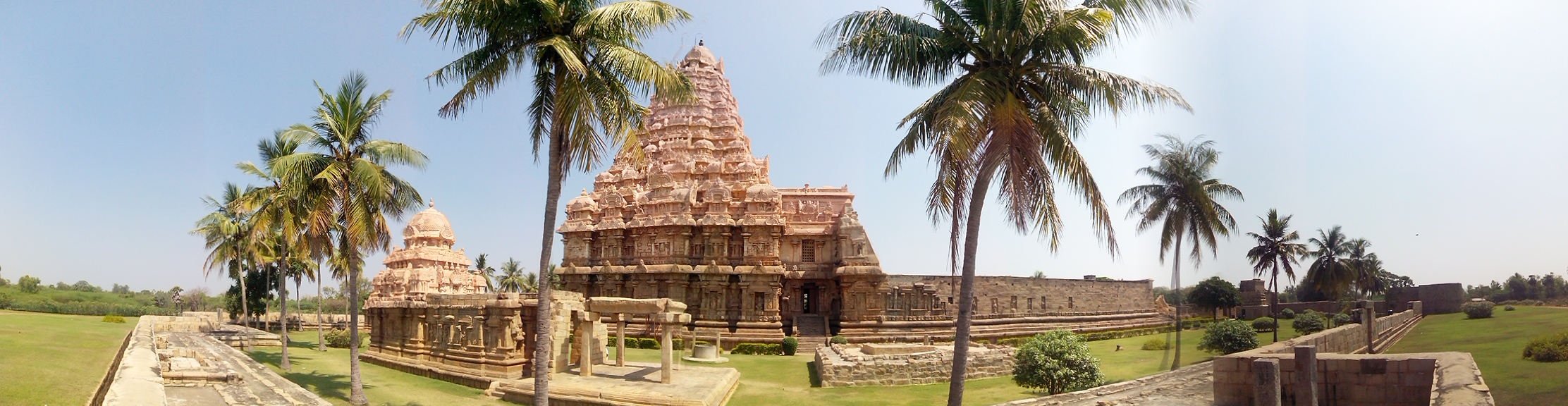
Panoramic view of the Gangaikonda Cholapuram temple complex.

=== Architecture ===
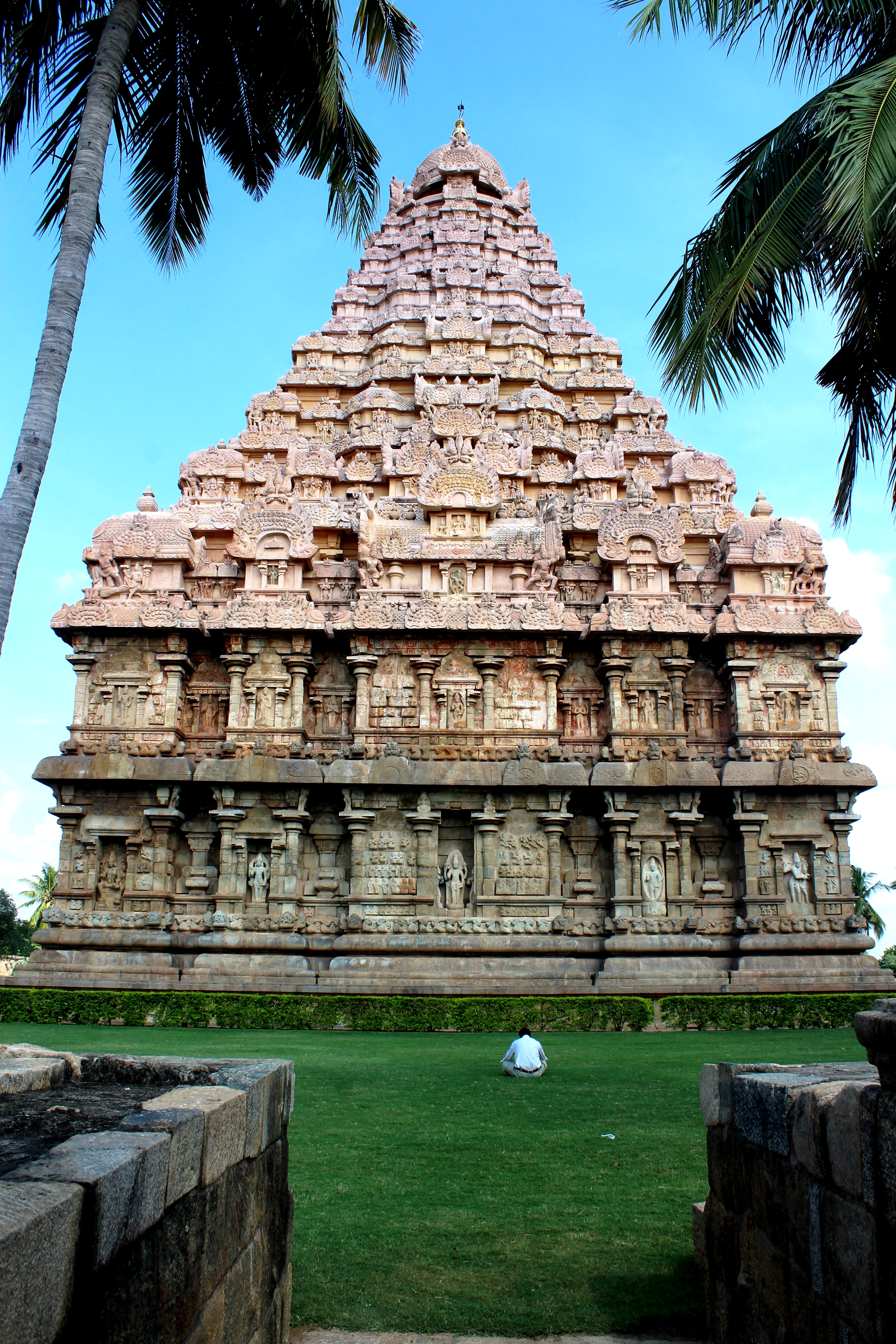
The vimana traces a curve, unlike Thanjavur temple.

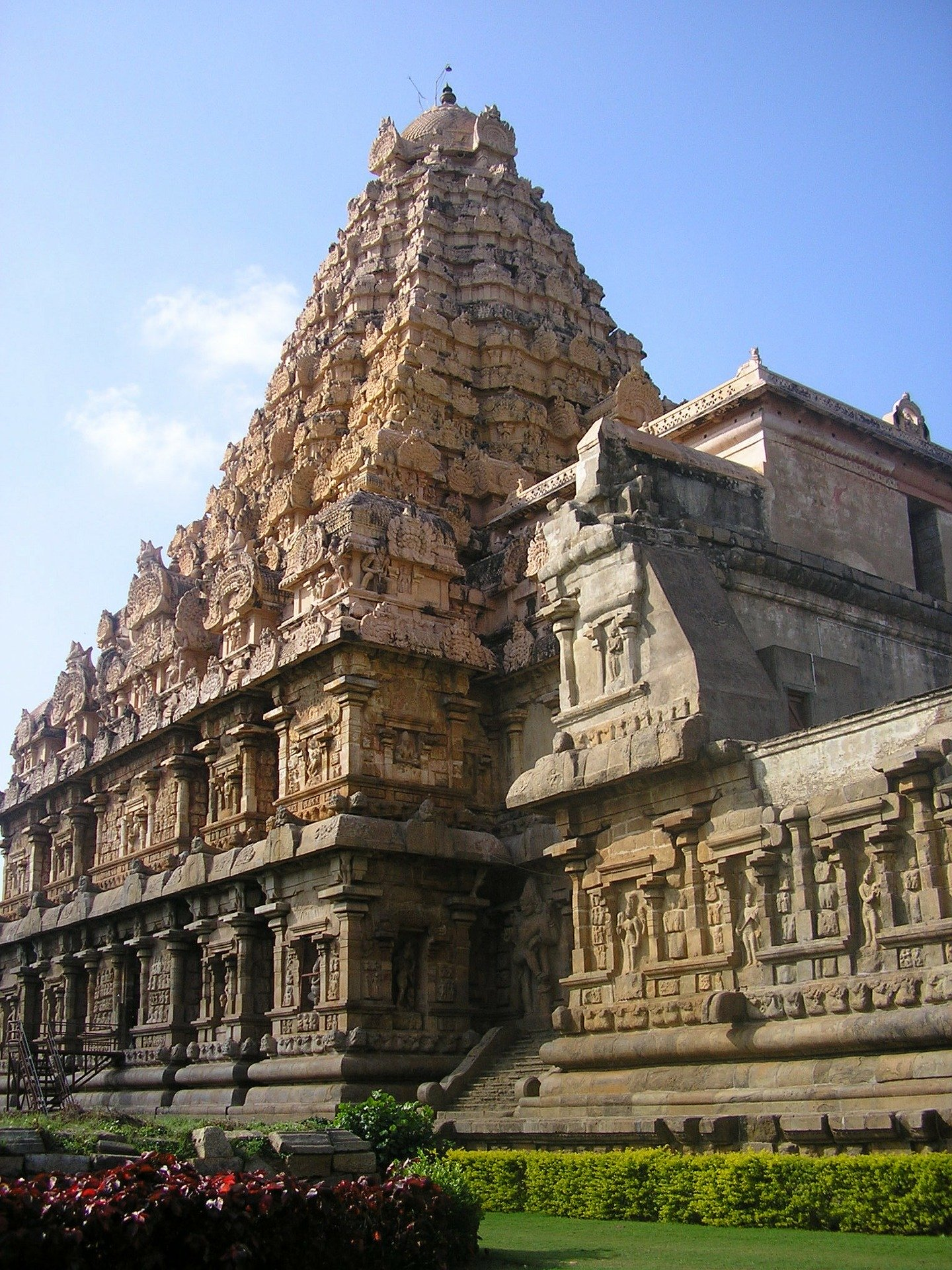
Side view highlighting the curved profile of the vimana

Gangaikonda Cholapuram Temple is built in Dravidian architecture with a square plan. The original courtyard is two squares stacked next to each other, all mandapas, the upapitham, the shrine plans, the garbha griha (sanctum) and the tower elements are all square shaped and incorporate circles and principles of geometric symmetry. The structural elements resemble the big Brihadisvara Temple in Thanjavur. Both include a courtyard entered through multiple gateways and relatively small gopuram (tower). Inside are shrines, most of which are aligned on an east–west axis; a few are perpendicular. The temple complex includes Nandi Mandapa, Alankar Mandapa, Maha Mandapa, Mukha Mandapa and Ardha Mandapa. Some of these were added and restored by Hindu kingdoms after the 14th century or by British India art conservation officials in the 19th century.

The visible upapitham measures 103.63 m (340.0 ft) long by 30.48 m (100.0 ft) with an east–west axis, but part of it is likely missing with the surviving foundation covered by soil and with a restored surface for tourism. On the visible part, states Balasubrahmanyam, the garbha griha (sanctum) is 30.48 m (100.0 ft) long, the maha mandapa (great hall) is 53.34 m (175.0 ft) long, and the ardha mandapa (partial hall) is 19.81 m (65.0 ft). The square-shaped ardha mandapa connects the sanctum and the great hall. The temple is one of the earliest ones to have pillared halls, which became a common feature in subsequent temples.

The main temple is built on an elevated structure with the courtyard measuring 560 ft (170 m) by 320 ft (98 m). Its sanctum measures 100 sq ft (9.3 m^{2}) and is entered through the Ardha Mandapa. The sanctum doorway is flanked by dvarapalas, the guardians, each 6 ft (1.8 m) tall. The sanctum contains Brihadeeswarar (Shiva) in the form of lingam. This lingam is 4 m (13 ft) tall and the base has a circumference of 18 m (59 ft).

There is an image of a seated Nandi bull in the courtyard, aligned axially 200 m (660 ft) facing the sanctum. There are five shrines around the sanctum and a Lion well, which was added during the 19th century. The temple site has a monolithic representation of Navagrahas, the nine planetary deities.

=== Sri-vimana ===
The vimanam (temple tower) is 55 m (180 ft) high, which is 3 m (9.8 ft) smaller than the Thanjavur Temple. Historians believe that the height of the temple is deliberately kept low in dimensions compared to the Thanjavur temple as a mark of respect of Rajendra to his father's masterpiece. Compared to the Thanjavur Temple, which has straight contours, this temple has a curvilinear contour, slightly concave towards the top. It is divided into eight zones.

The tower rises as a vertical square structure to a height of 10.67 m (35.0 ft) above the adhisthanam. It has two horizontal bands with a massive cornice wrapped around it. Each band has five individual bays on the south, west and east sides with pilasters between the bays. The end bays are squares, the other three are oblong. The center bay of each set of five being the widest. On each side are carvings on the wall with four horizontal rows of friezes. These narrate Hindu legends and Puranic mythologies from the Shaiva, Vaishnava and Shakta traditions. Each storey has moulded horizontal projections (cornices) with floral arch-shaped motifs (gavaksha). According to Balasubrahmanyam, incorporated in the features are mythical creatures in the form of yali, and the entablature is decorated with necklace shaped motifs.

The Sri-vimana at Gangaikonda has nine storeys (talas) including those at the lower levels, in contrast to the thirteen storeys at Thanjavur. Each storey has a square-circle-oblong artwork. The upper levels repeat the lower level design in a rhythmic shrinking pattern. The symmetry principles are dutifully embedded in, but the rate of shrinking is not linear with height. The lower storeys shrink faster than the upper storeys. This gives the vimana an uncommon parabolic form. The griva (neck) is oriented towards the cardinal directions, and like the Thanjavur Temple, Nandi bulls sit on its top corners. Above the griva is the kirtimukhas, then a symmetric open lotus. The tower is capped with a kalasa, whose inscription was once gold coated; the gold is long gone. Above the kalasa is a lotus bud greeting the sky.

=== Sculpture ===
Gangaikondacholapuram temple sculpture
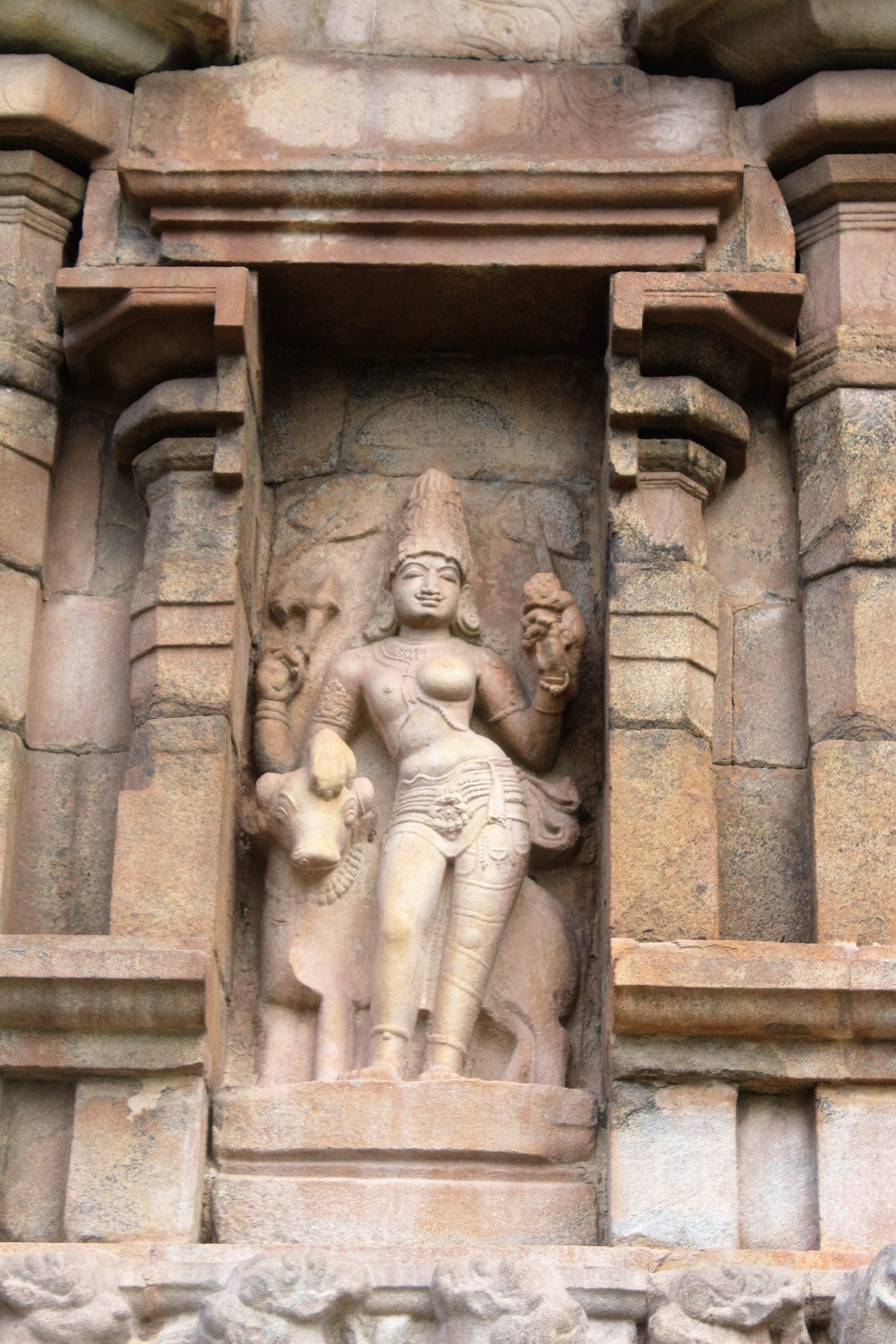
Ardhanarishvara (half Shiva, half Parvati)

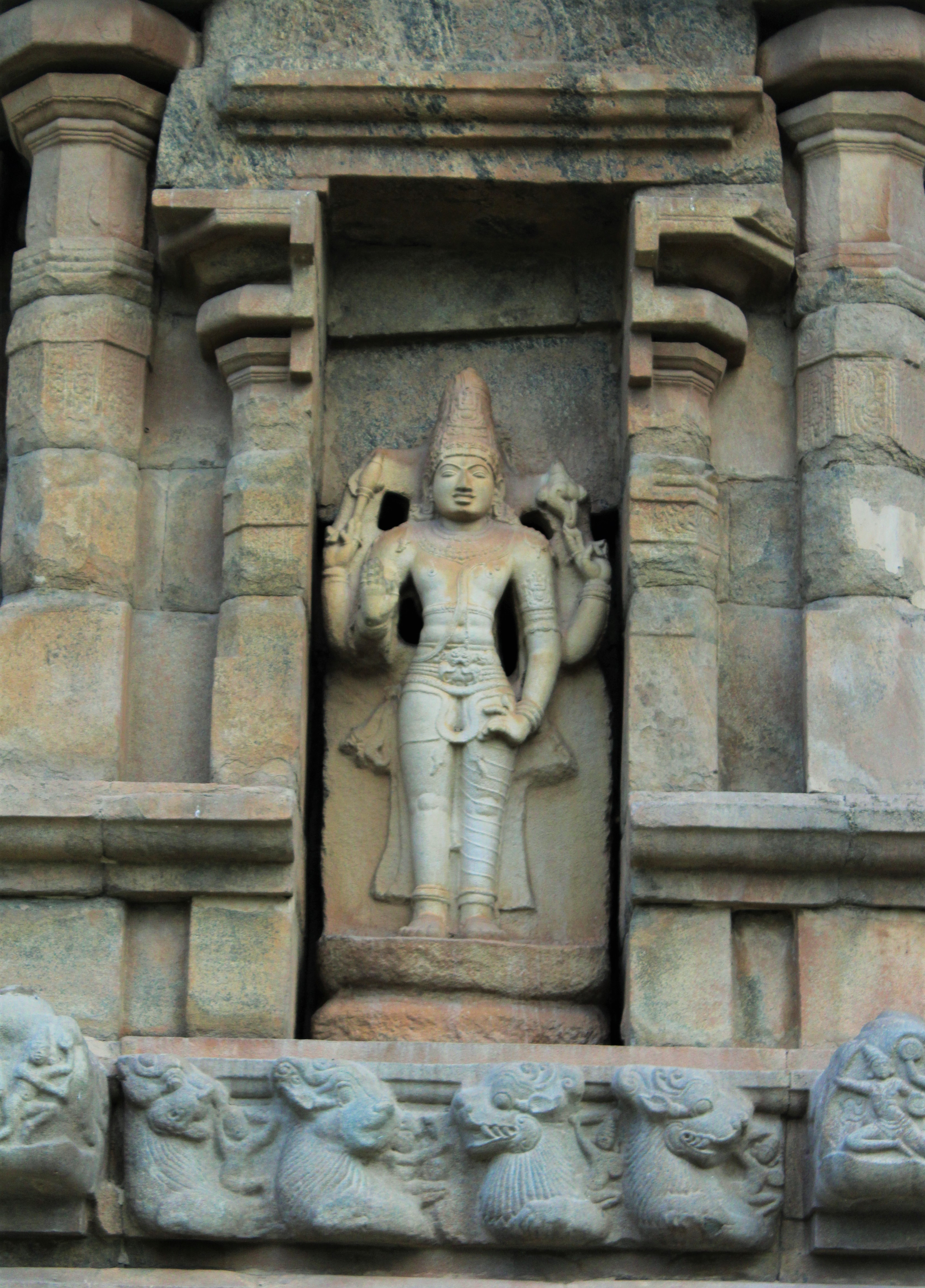
Harihara (half Shiva, half Vishnu)

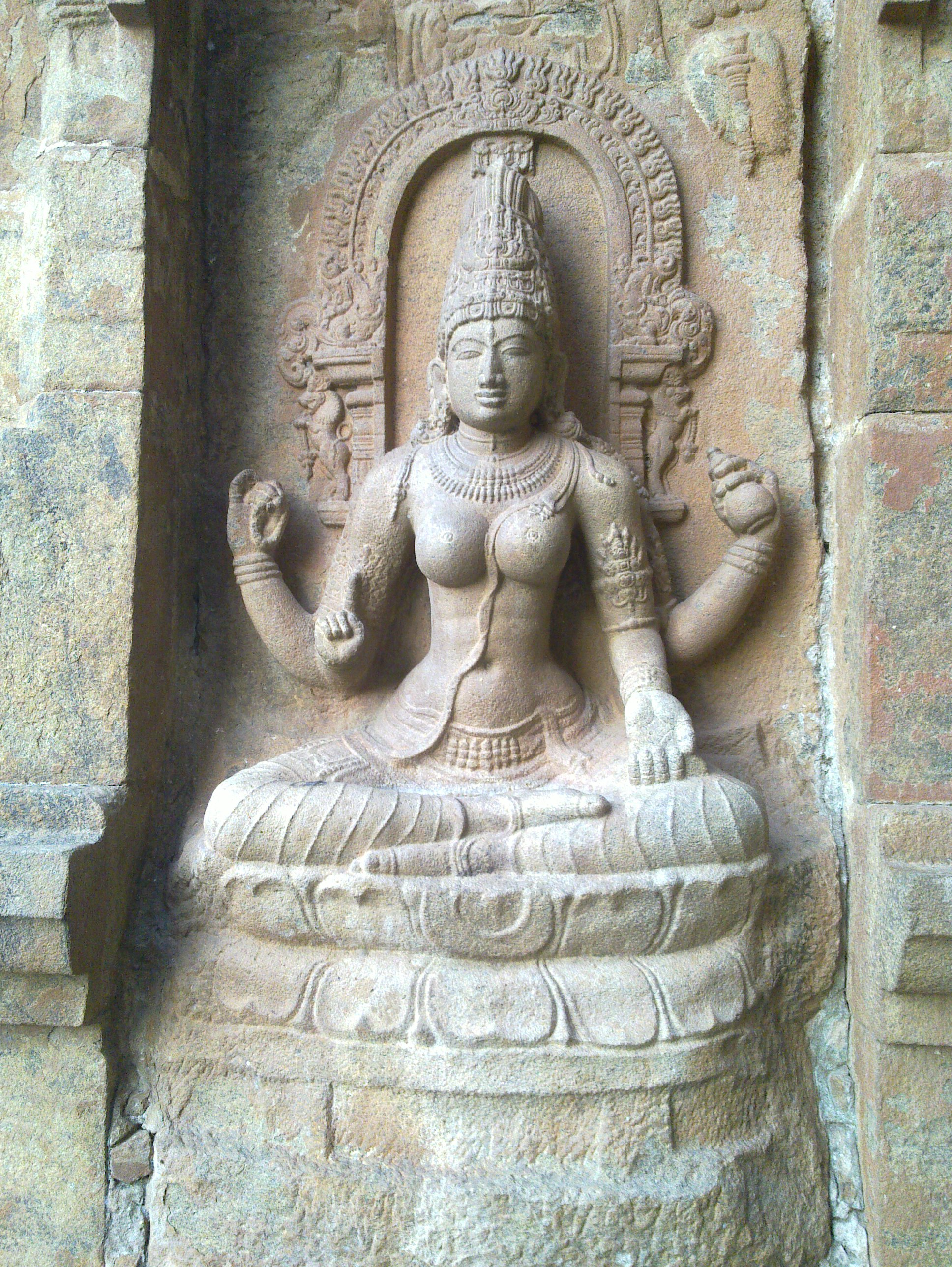
Saraswati

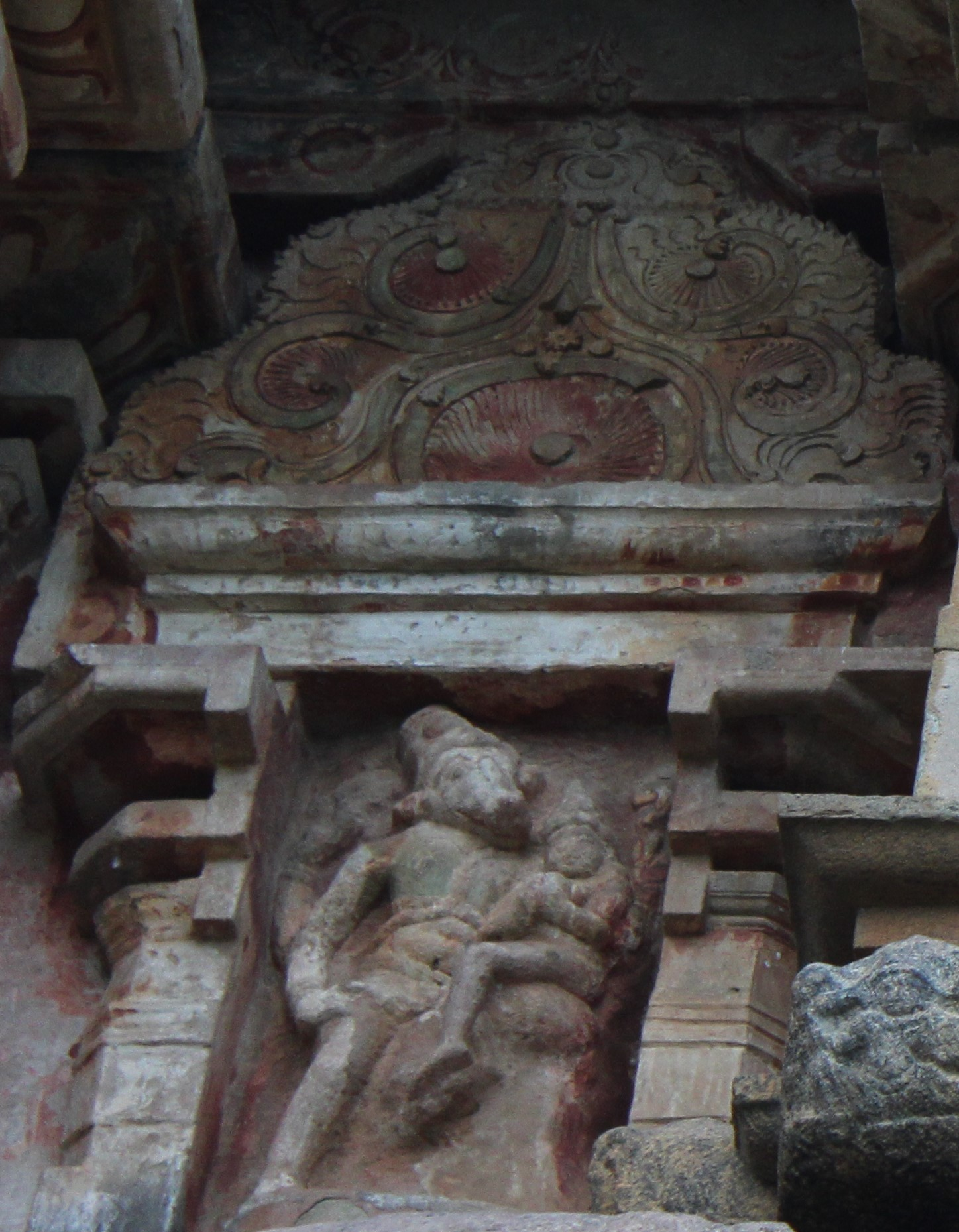
Varaha (avatar of Vishnu)

There are about fifty sculptural reliefs around the walls of the sanctum, three of which — Nataraja, Saraswati and Shiva garlanding a devotee — being the most prominent. There is a shrine for Shaiva saint and scholar Chandeshvara (one of the sixty-three Nayanars). There are other niches around the temple walls depicting various forms of Shiva, Durga and Vishnu. There are many bronze statues in the temple depicting Chola art of the 11th century, with the one of Kartikeya being the most recognisable.

One relief includes a most unusual portrait of a Hindu ruler who built the temple. Shiva, with Parvati beside him, hands down a garland of flowers to mark his victory to a diminutive seated figure of Rajendra I.

== History ==
The temple was constructed in 1035 CE by Rajendra Chola I (1012–44 CE), the son of the famous Chola king Raja Raja Chola I, who built the Brihadeeswarar Temple at Thanjavur. Some experts believe that the temple was built during 1020, during the 6th regnal year, but inscriptions indicate the 20th regnal year, which is 1035 CE. Rajendra wanted to emulate the temple built by his father after his victory in a campaign across India that Chola era texts state covered Karnataka, Andhra Pradesh, Odisha, and Bengal. After his victory, he demanded that the defeated kingdoms send pots of Ganges River water and pour them into the temple's well. The well was originally called Cholagangam as it was filled with water from Ganges.

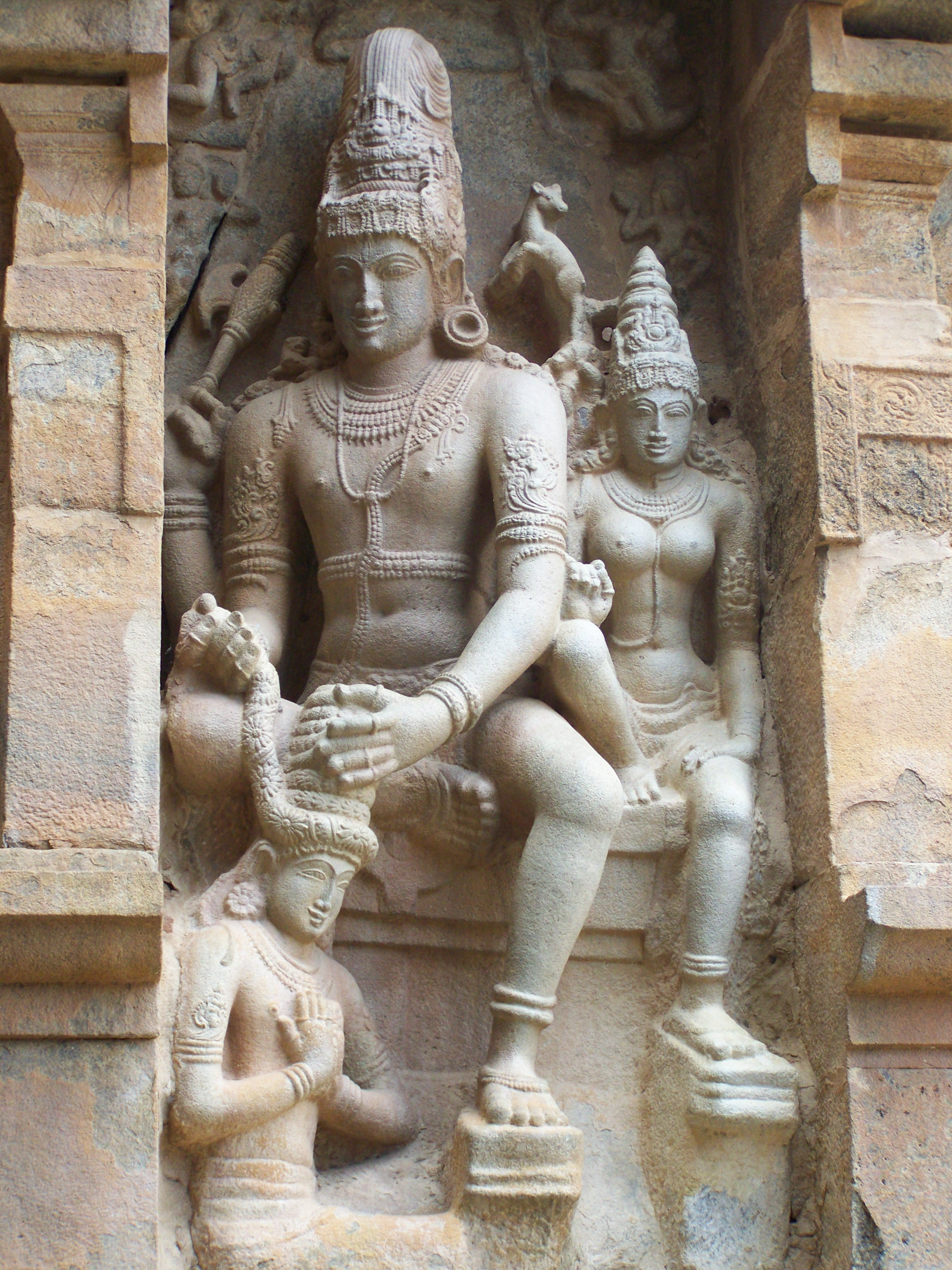
Shiva shown garlanding king Rajendra I

Rajendra I, as is Tamil tradition, then assumed the name Gangaikonda Cholan, meaning the one who conquered the Ganges. He established Gangaikonda Cholapuram as his capital from the earlier Chola capital of Thanjavur. Gangaikonda Cholapuram remained the Chola capital for the next 250 years. Rajendra I built the entire capital with several temples using plans and infrastructure recommended in Tamil Vastu and Agama Sastra texts. These included a Dharma Sasta, Vishnu and other temples. However, these structures were destroyed in the late 13th and 14th centuries except this temple. The other Chola landmarks, clearly shown by soil covered mounds and excavated broken pillar stumps and brick walls, are found over a large area nearby. The earliest inscription that mentions this city by name is dated 1029, while the earliest reference to Rajendra I's expedition towards the Ganges river in the north is dated 1023. The first gift to the newly built Gangaikonda Cholapuram temple is dated 1035.

Rajendra I, states Dehejia, must have involved the same craftsmen used by his father and transferred them from Thanjavur. Most or all of the Chola kings from Rajendra I had their coronation at Gangaikonda Cholapuram. Archaeological excavations have revealed fort walls and palace remains a few kilometers from this temple. It is believed that Kulothunga Chola I, Rajendra's successor, built fortifications around the city.

The reasons for the city's destruction are unclear. According to Vasanthi, the Pandyas who defeated the Cholas during the later part of 13th-century "may have razed the city to ground" to avenge their previous defeats. However, it is unclear why other temples were destroyed and this temple was spared, as well as why there are around twenty inscriptions from later Cholas, Pandyas and Vijayanagar Empires indicating various gifts and grants to this temple if they previously razed this place.

An alternative theory links the destruction to the raids, plunder and wars, particularly with the invasion of the capital city and the territories, that were earlier a part of the Chola and Madurai Empires, by the armies of the Delhi Sultanate led by the Muslim commander Malik Kafur in 1311, followed by Khusrau Khan in 1314, and Muhammad bin Tughlaq in 1327. The period that followed saw wars between the Hindu kings and the Muslim sultans who succeeded the Delhi Sultanate and carved out new states such as the nearby Madurai Sultanate (1335–1378). (Note: Thanjavur was a target of both Muslim and Hindu kingdoms, both near and far. The Madurai Sultanate was established in the 14th century, after the disastrous invasions and plunder of South India by Ala ud-Din Khalji's armies of the Delhi Sultanate led by Malik Kafur. Later the Adil Shahi Sultanate, the Qutb Shahis, the Randaula Khan and others from the east and west coasts of South India raided it, and some occupied it for a few years.) The Vijayanagara Empire defeated the Madurai Sultanate in 1378 and this temple, along with other Chola era temples, then returned to the control of Hindu kings who repaired and restored many of them.

== Texts ==
Gangaikonda Cholpuram and the temple are mentioned in many of the contemporary works of the period like Muvar Ula and Kalingathuparani. Scholars like Vasanthi believe that the 11th century Tamil poet Kambar's description of Ayodhya was based on the streets and city structure of Gangaikonda Cholapuram. Similar correlation is derived based on the works of Sekkizhar in Periya Puranam. Muvar Ula, a treatise on the Cheras, Cholas and Pandyas, provides a vivid account of the city and the temple. Like the Thanjavur temple, this temple is also believed to have emerged as a centre of social, economic and political activities. Cultural activities like music, dance and art in the form of bronzes were encouraged and staged in the temple.

== Today ==
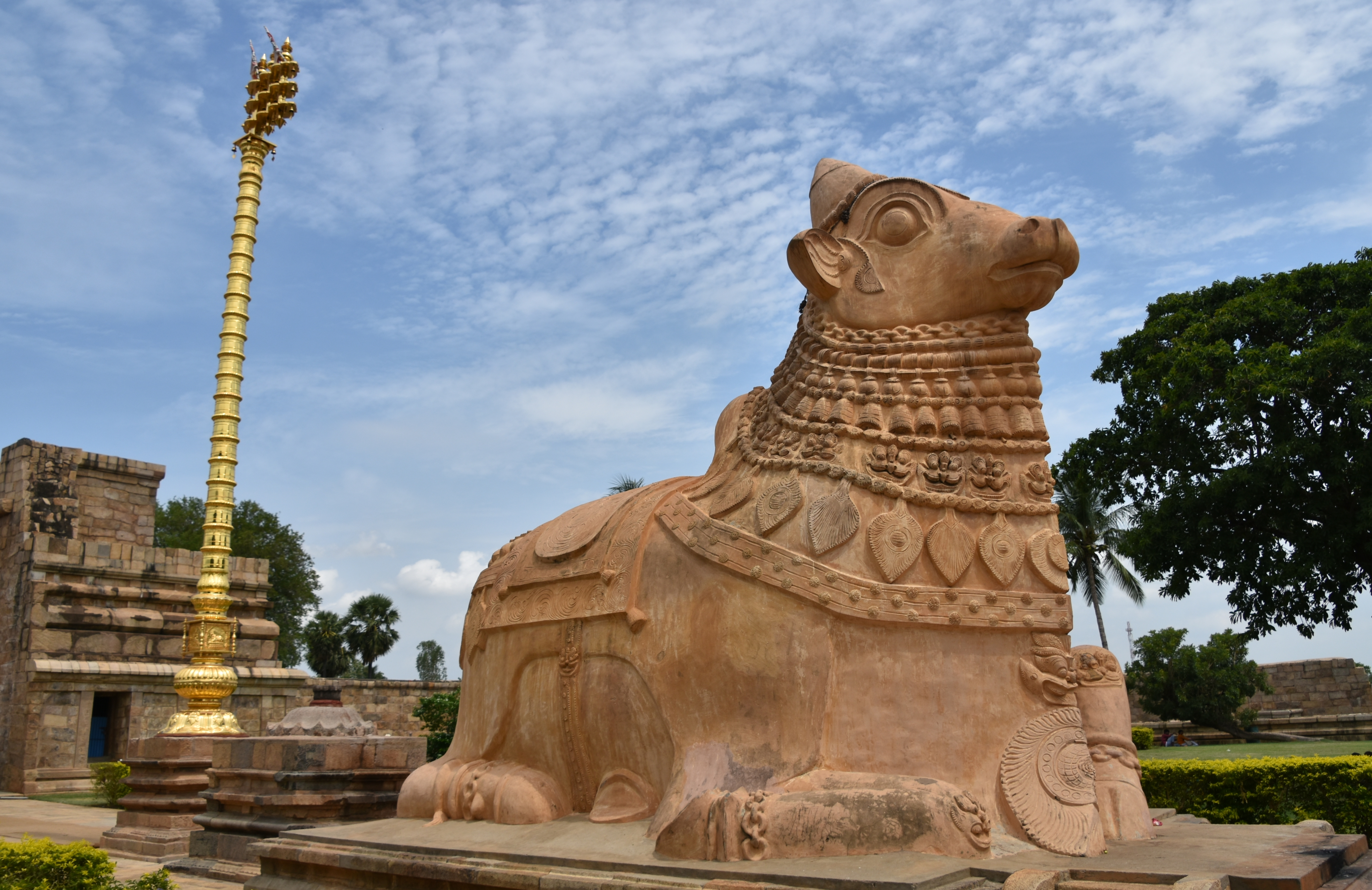
The Nandi facing the sanctum.

The temple was added to the list of Great Living Chola Temples in the year 2004. All three temples were built by the Cholas between the 10th and 12th centuries CE and have many similarities. The Archaeological Survey of India (ASI) made additions to the shopping and visitor attraction offices in the temple in 2009 that included a museum, restaurant, shops and restrooms under the aegis of the Hindu Religious and Endowment Board of the Government of Tamil Nadu. The temples are classified as Great Living Chola Temples as they are still visited, worshiped in and used as they were when they were constructed. The millennium celebration of the coronation of the Rajendra Chola was celebrated in the temple over two days during July 2014.

== Festivals and worship practises ==
Though it is administered by the ASI as a monument, worship practises are followed similar to those at other Shiva temples in Tamil Nadu. The temple follows Saivite tradition and the temple priests perform the pooja (rituals) during festivals and daily basis. The temple rituals are performed four times a day: Kalasanthi at 8:30 a.m., Uchikalam at 12:30 p.m., Sayarakshai at 6:00 p.m., and Arthajamam between 7:30 –8:00 p.m. Each ritual has three steps: alangaram (decoration), neivethanam (food offering) and deepa aradanai (waving of lamps) for both Brihadeeswarar and Periya Nayagi. There are weekly, monthly and fortnightly rituals performed in the temple. The temple is open from 6:00 a.m.–12:30 p.m. and 4:00 p.m.–9:00 p.m. every day. The temple has many festivals in its calendar, with the Shivarathri during the Tamil month of Masi (February–March), Aipassi Pournami during Aipassi (October–November) and Thiruvadirai during Margazhi (December–January) being the most prominent. Annabhishekam, the ablution of the presiding deity with cooked rice is performed during Aipasi festival.

== Gallery ==
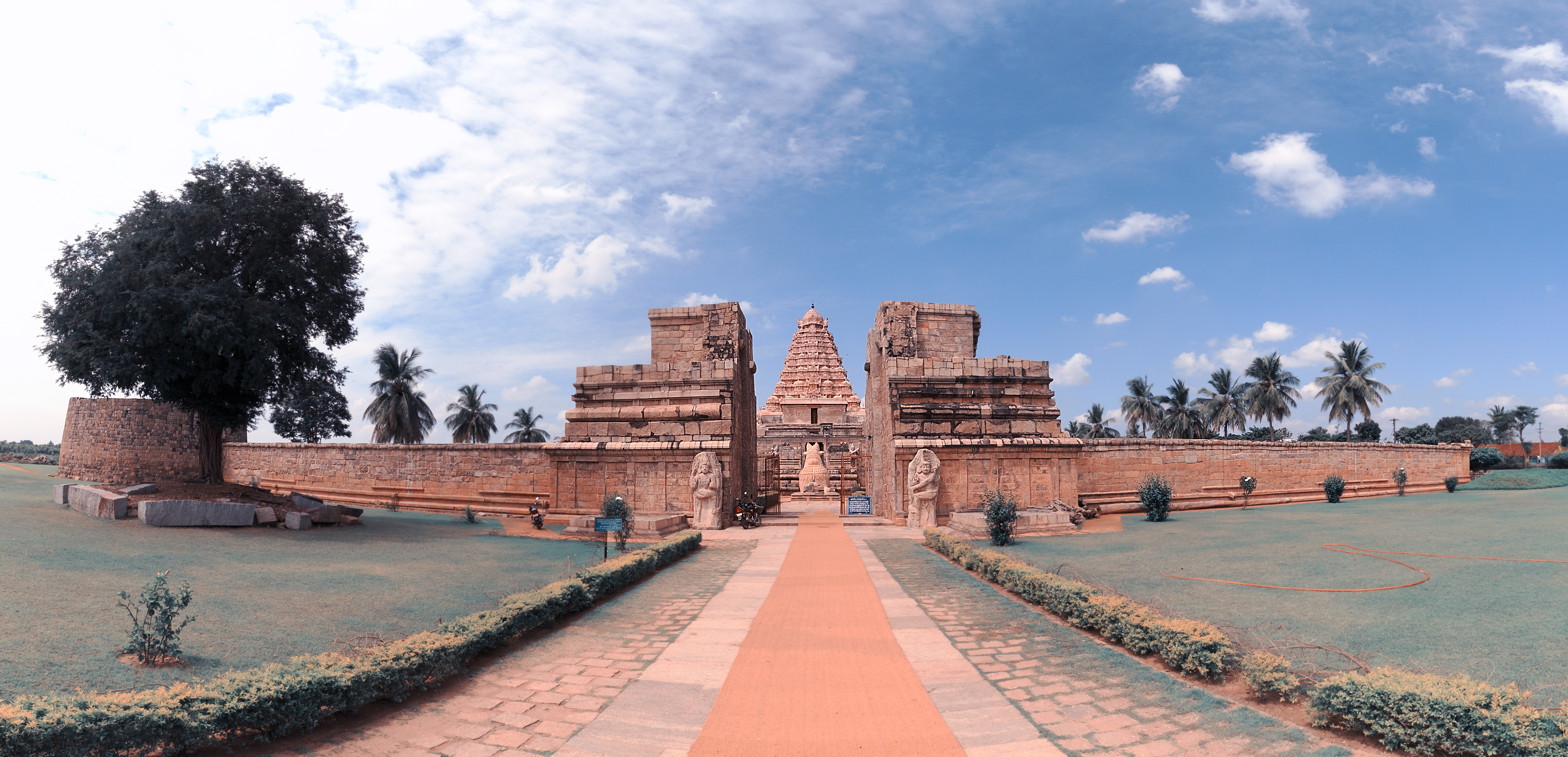
Panoramic view of the entrance to the Brihadisvara Temple complex

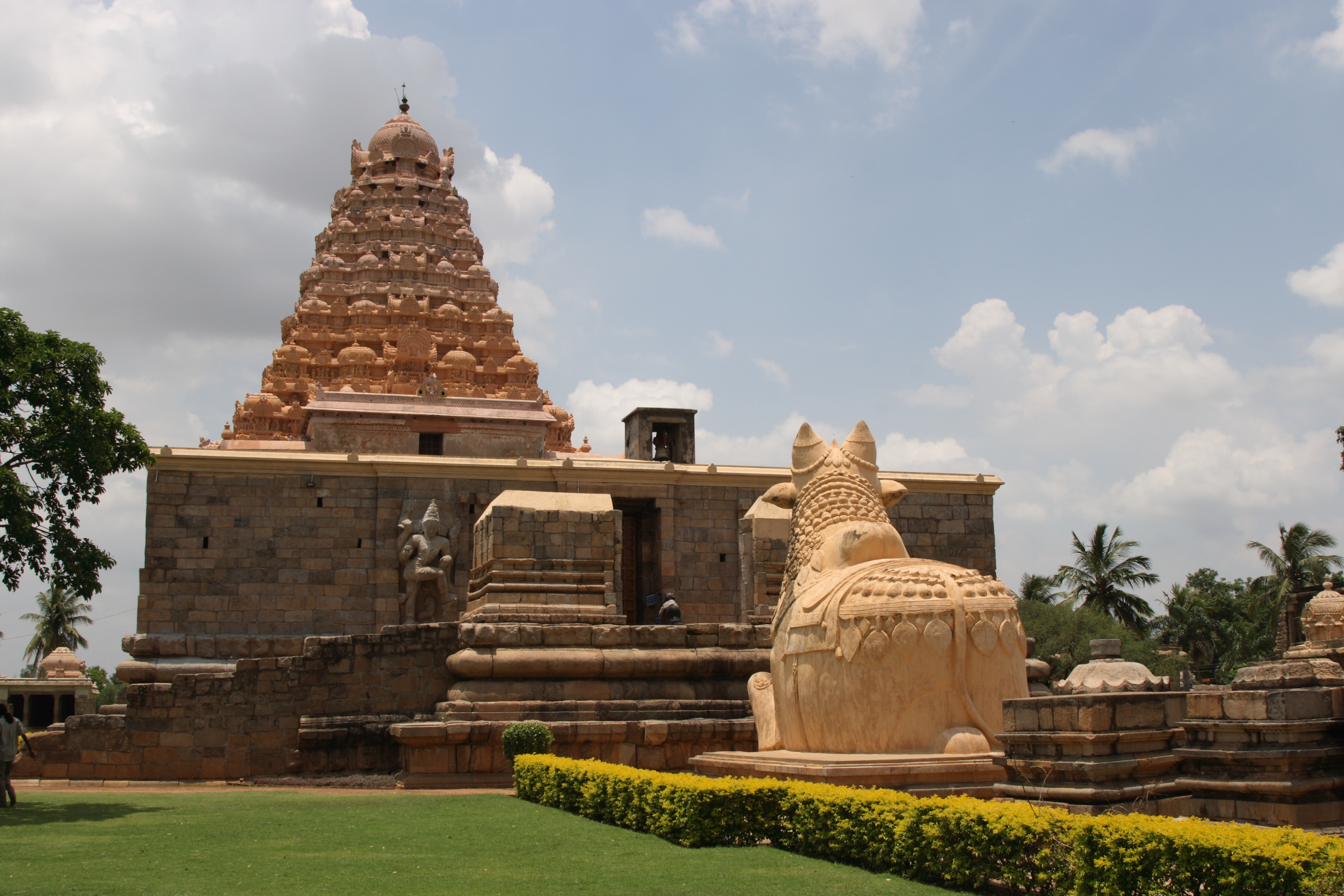
Nandi facing the sanctum at the Brihadisvara Temple

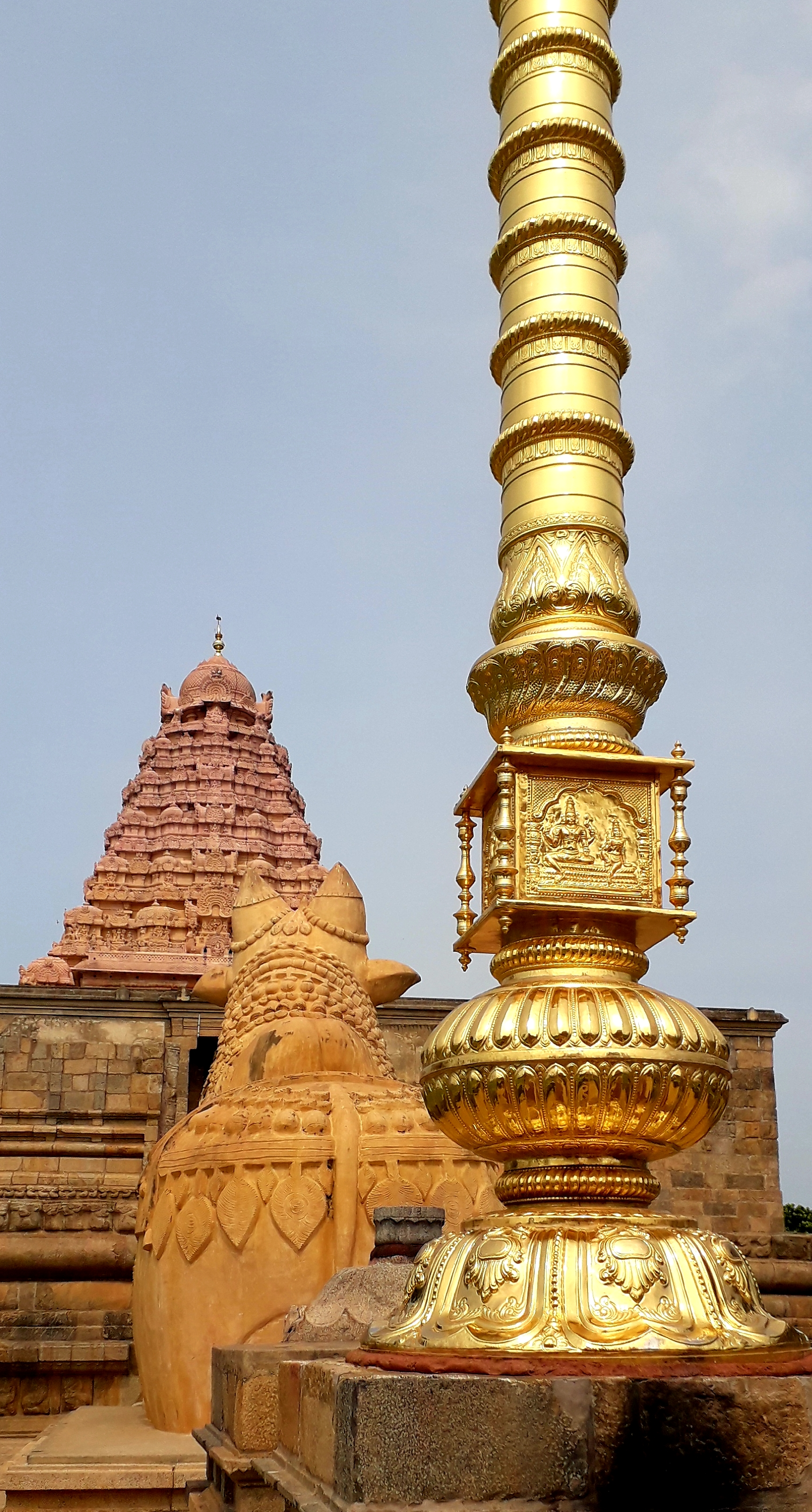
Dhvajastambha

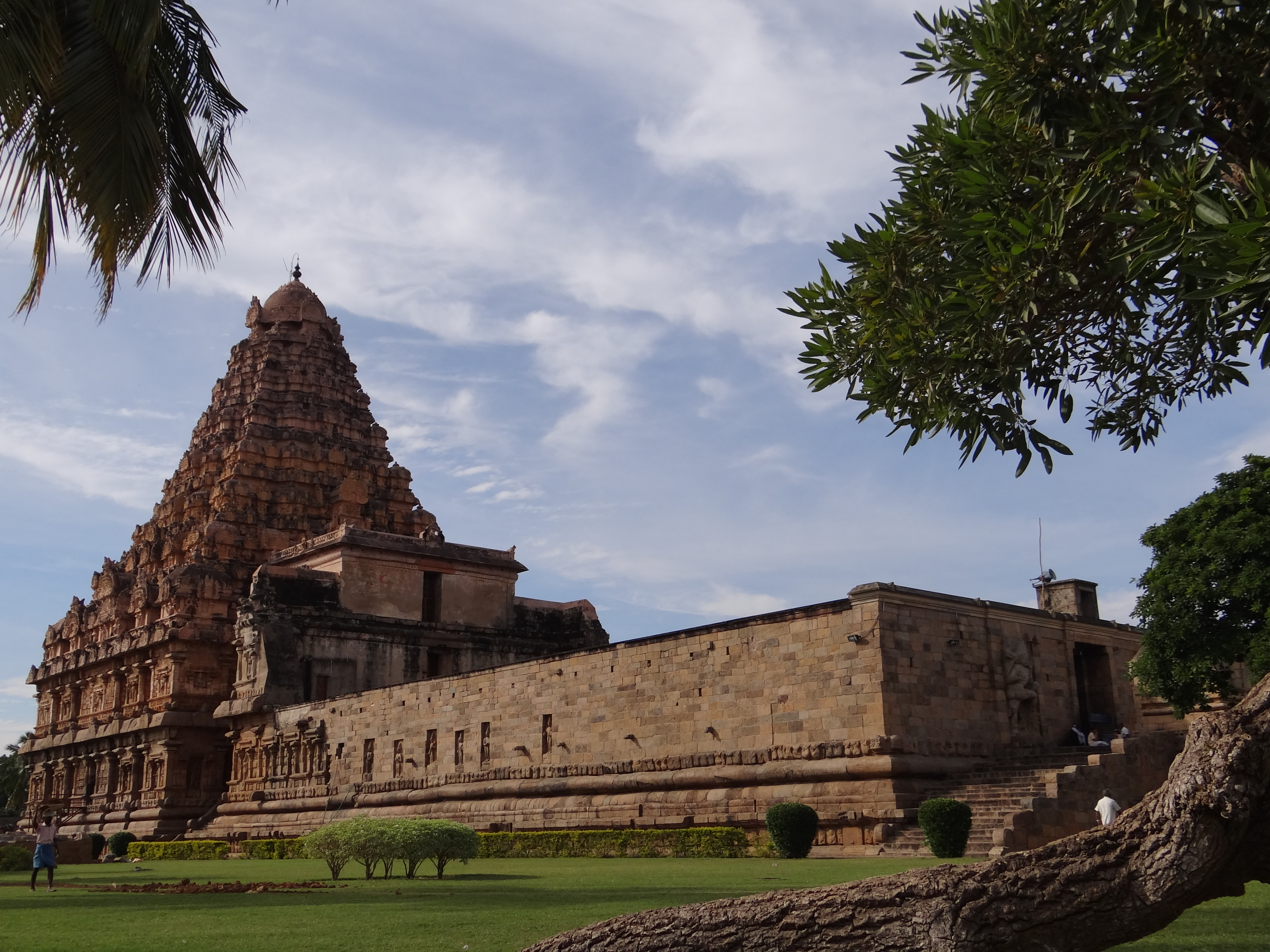
Vimana of the Brihadisvara Temple

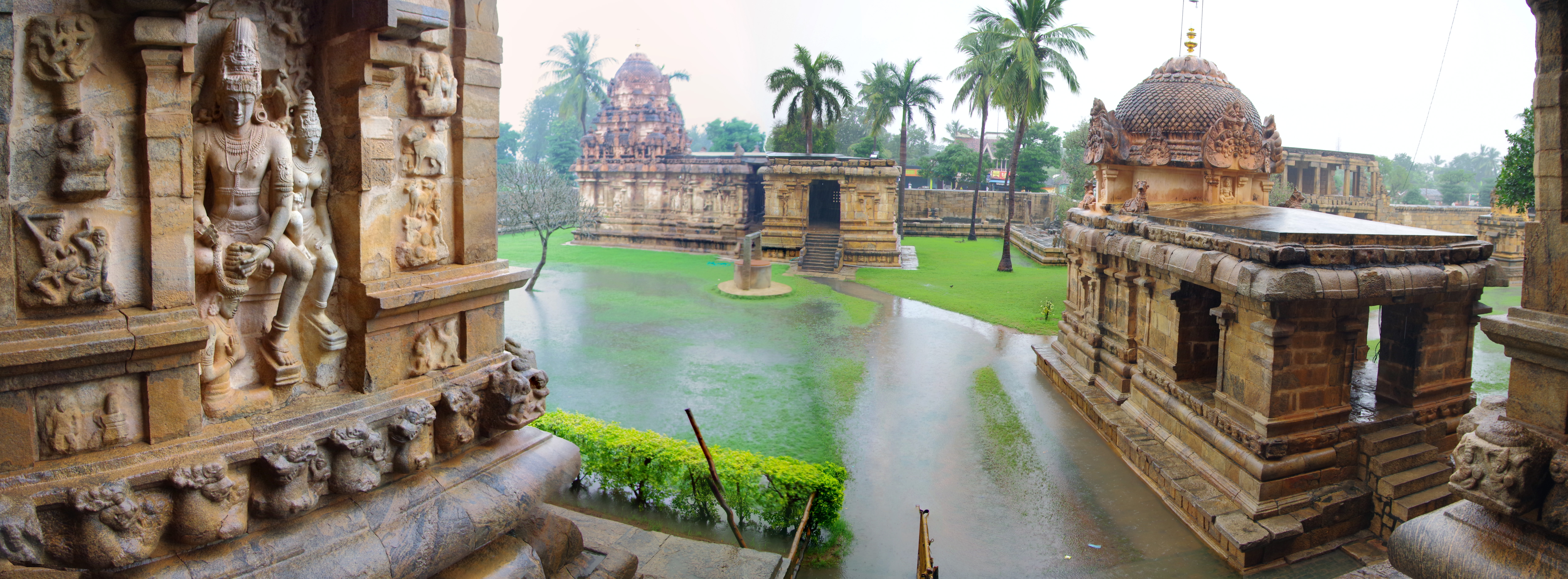
Courtyard view of the temple complex

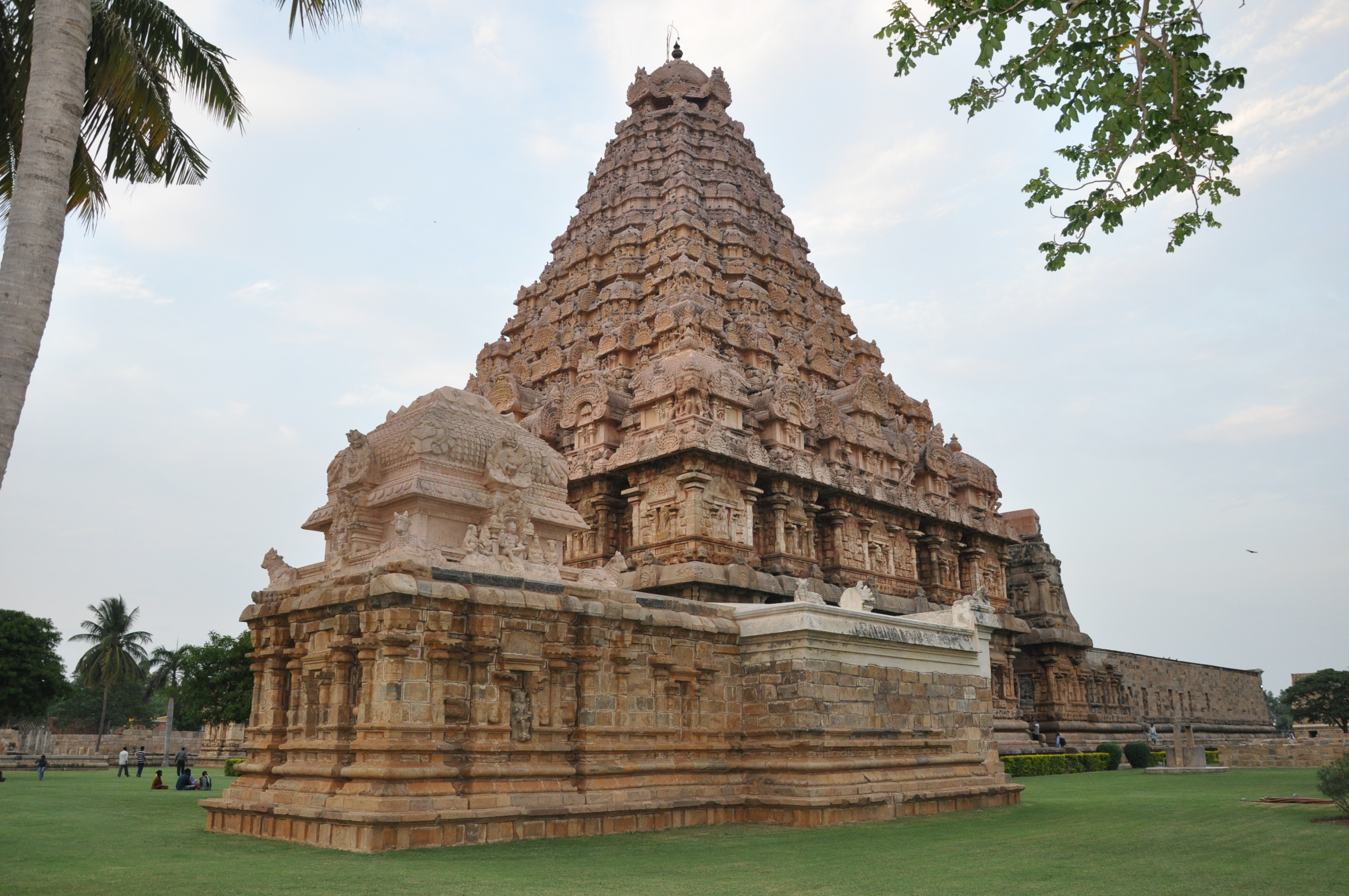
The Ganesha shrine with the main Shiva temple

=== Sculptures and reliefs ===
The temple features many sculptures and reliefs.

==== Shaivism ====
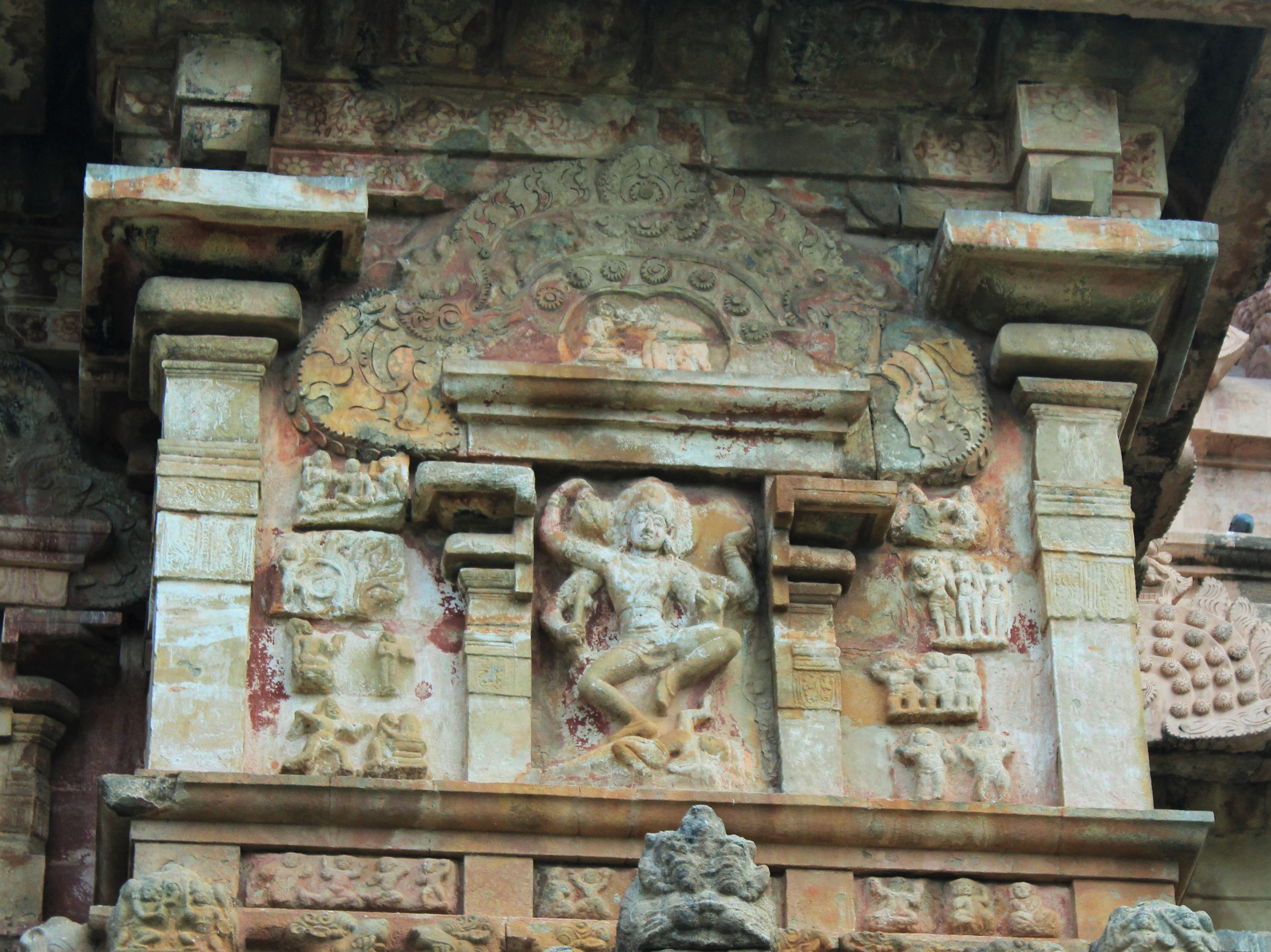
Nataraja dancing over the demon of ignorance.

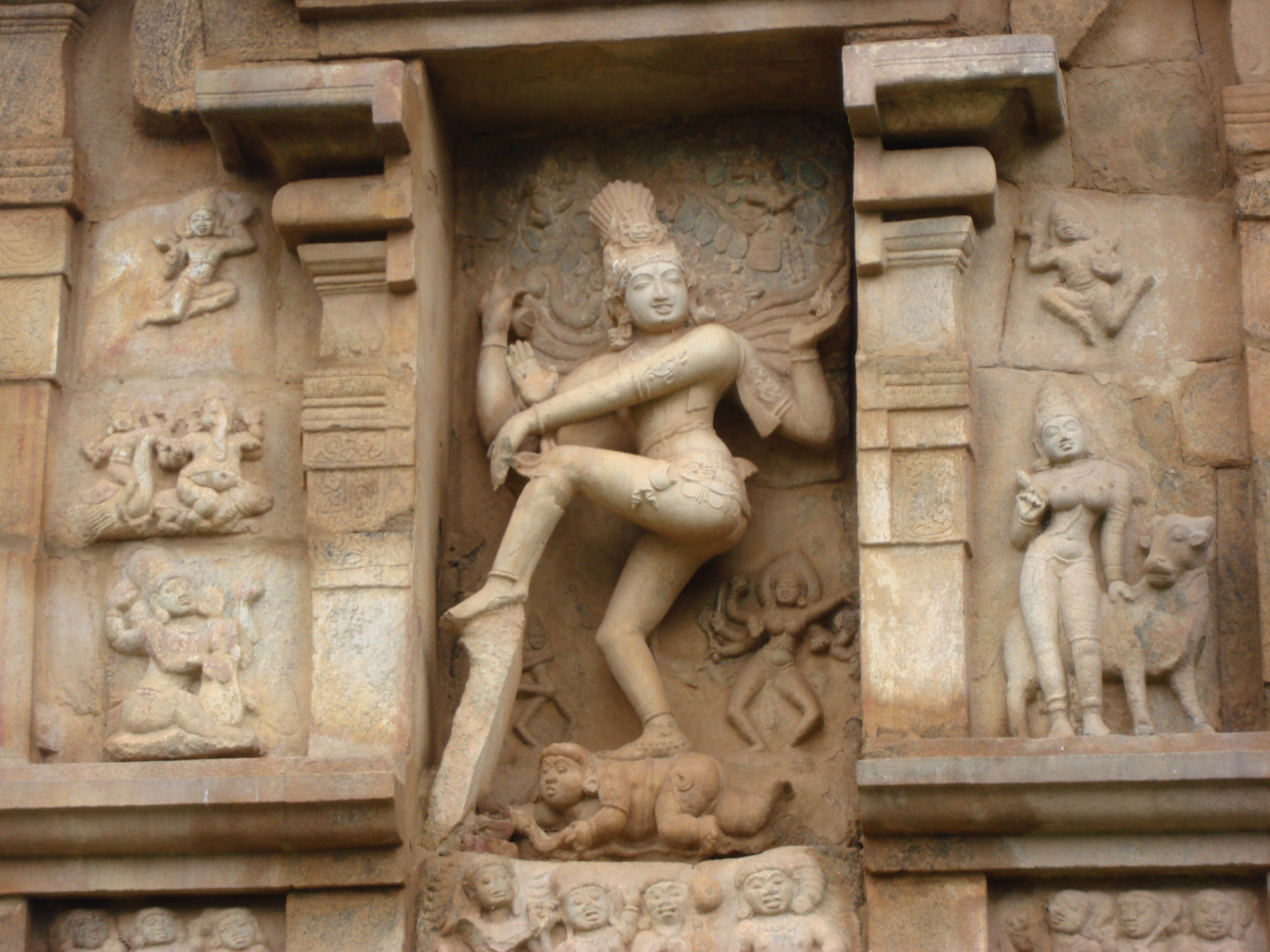
Another depiction of Nataraja, surrounded by Parvati and other deities dancing.

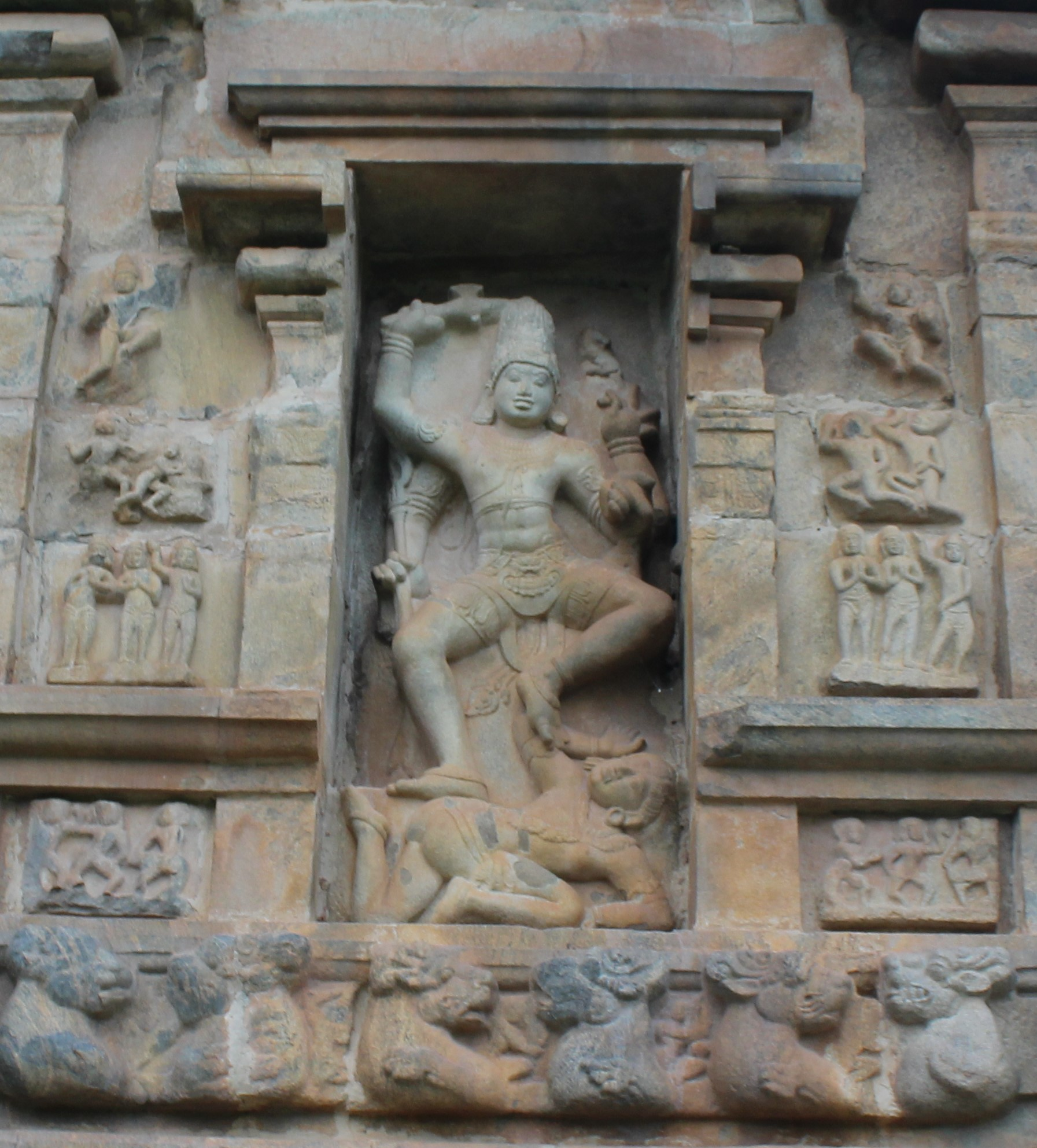
Kalantaka legend, signifying the dance of time and eternity by Shiva

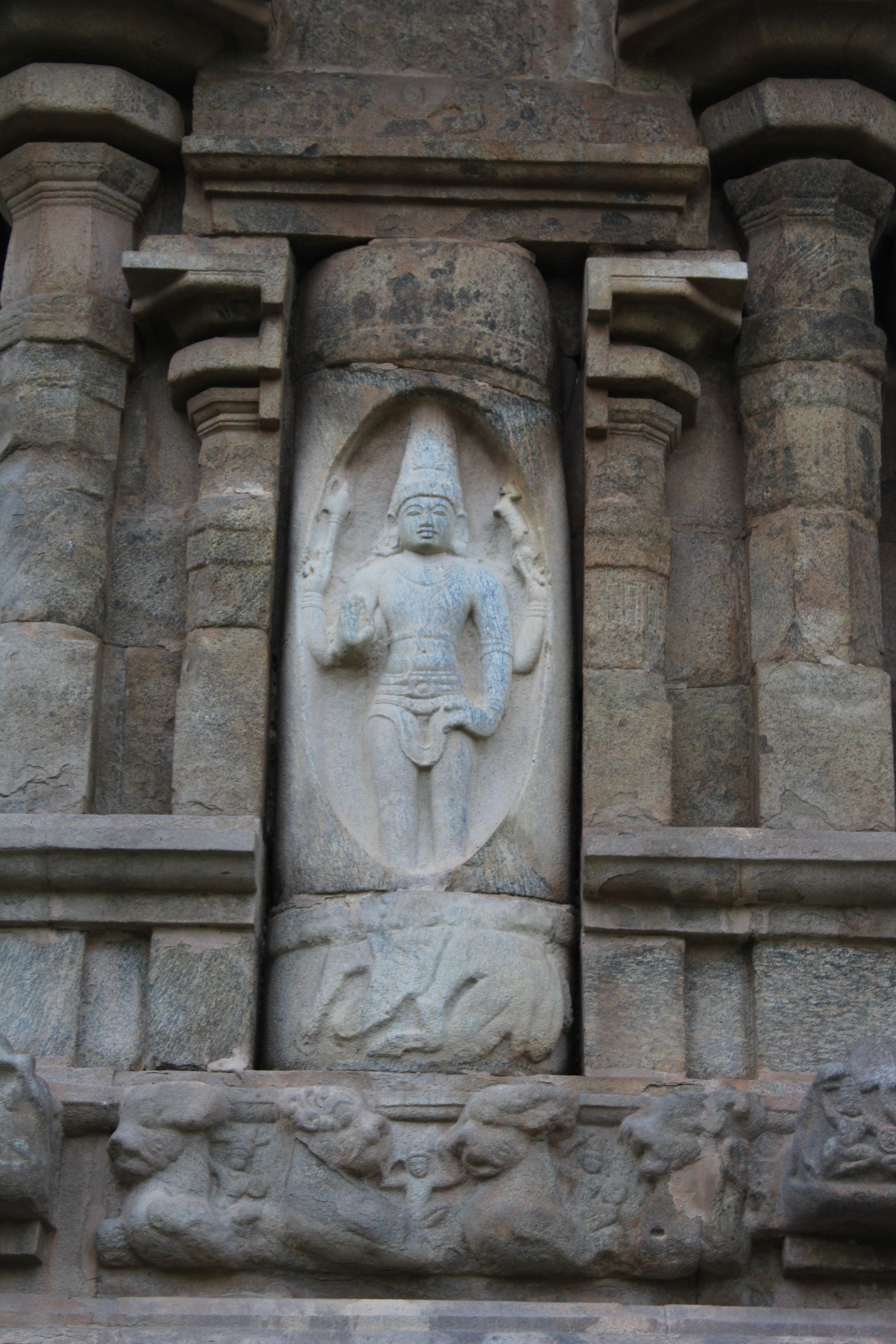
Shiva inside linga - Lingodbhava

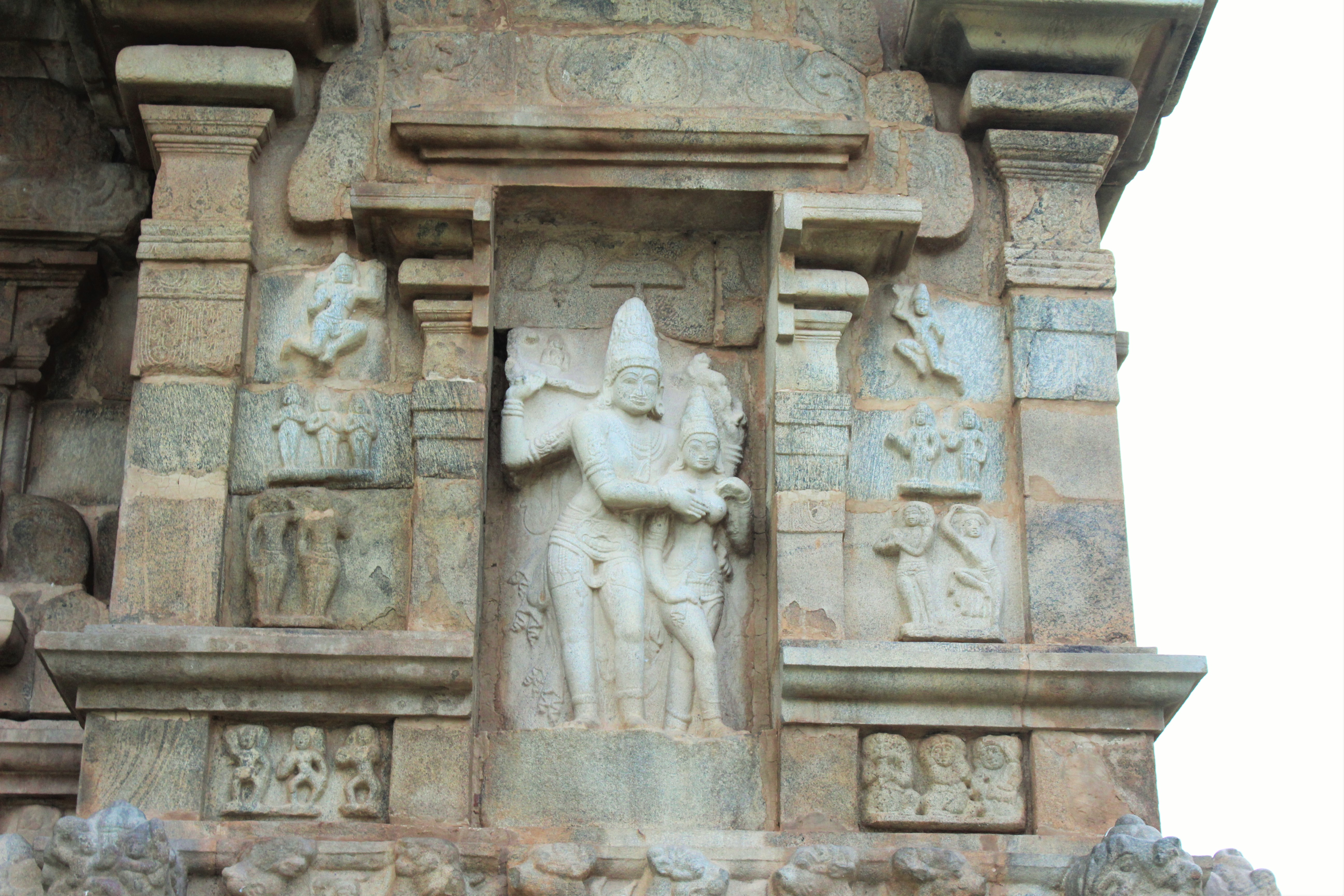
Shiva with Parvati in an amorous pose, dancer panels surround them.

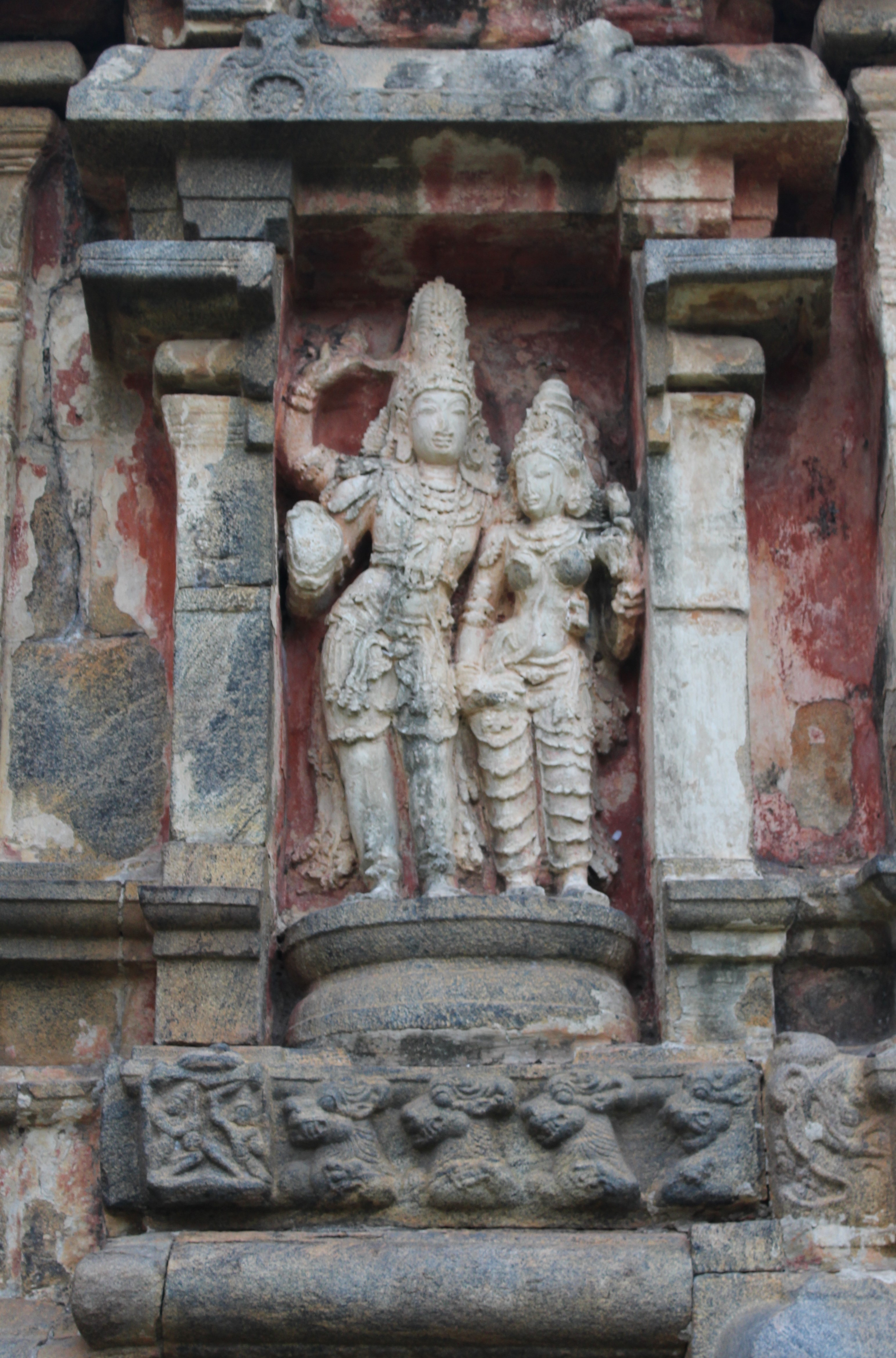
Shiva with Parvati in abhaya mudra, warrior panels below them.

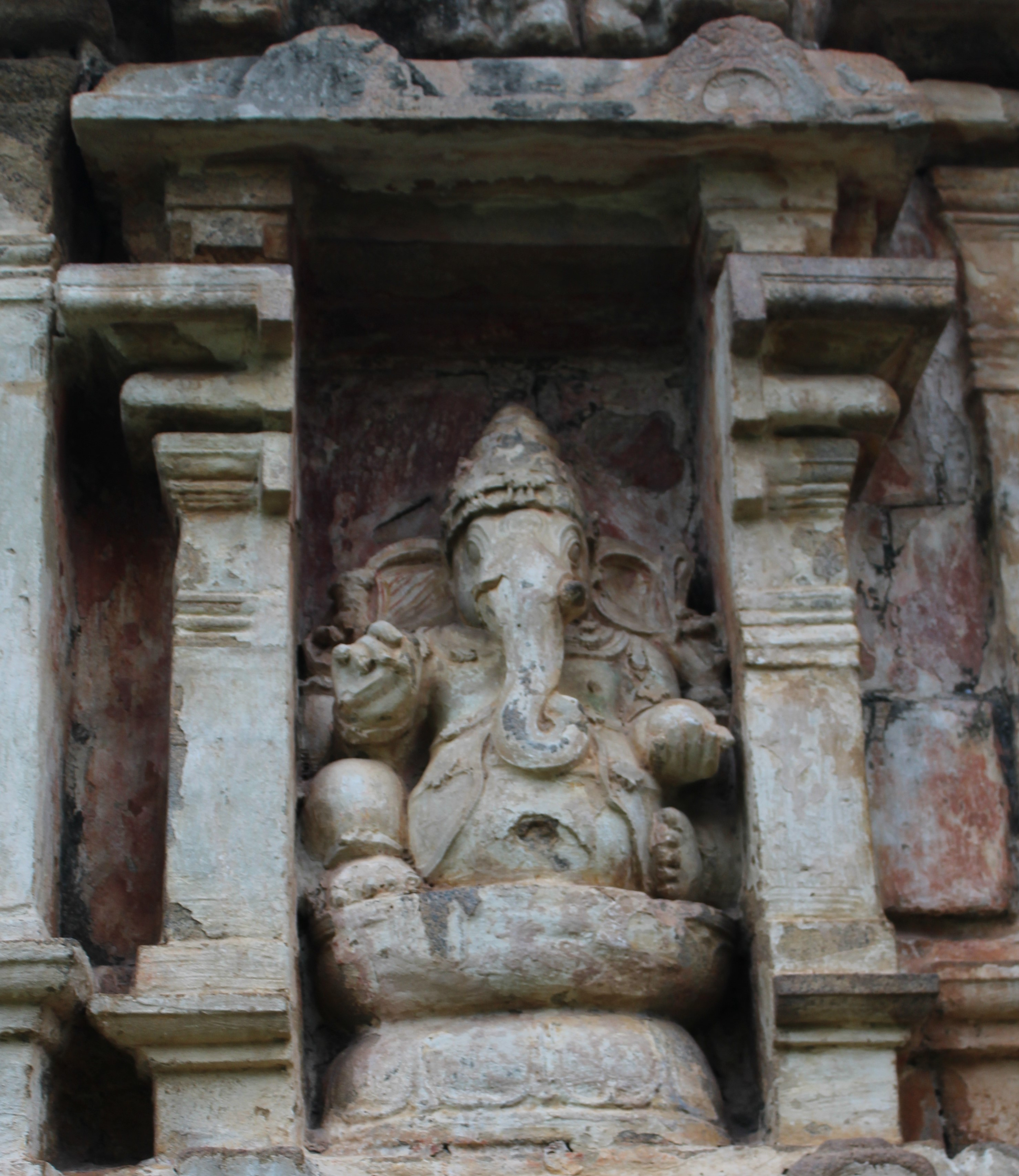
Ganesha, son of Parvati and Shiva, with a pen and sweetmeat food in his hands.

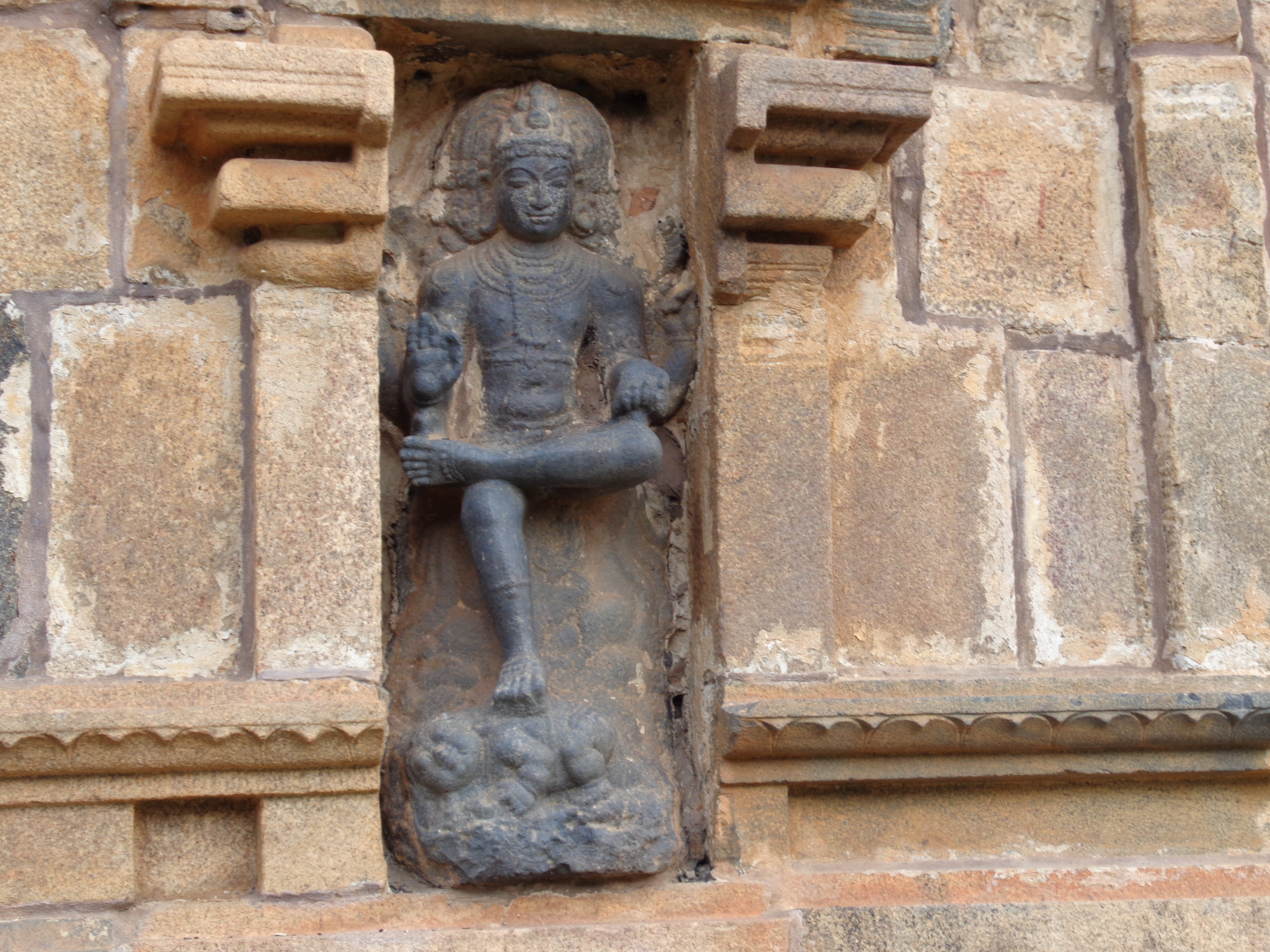
Dakshinamurti portrayed as the teacher of yoga, dance and sciences stepping over demon of ignorance.

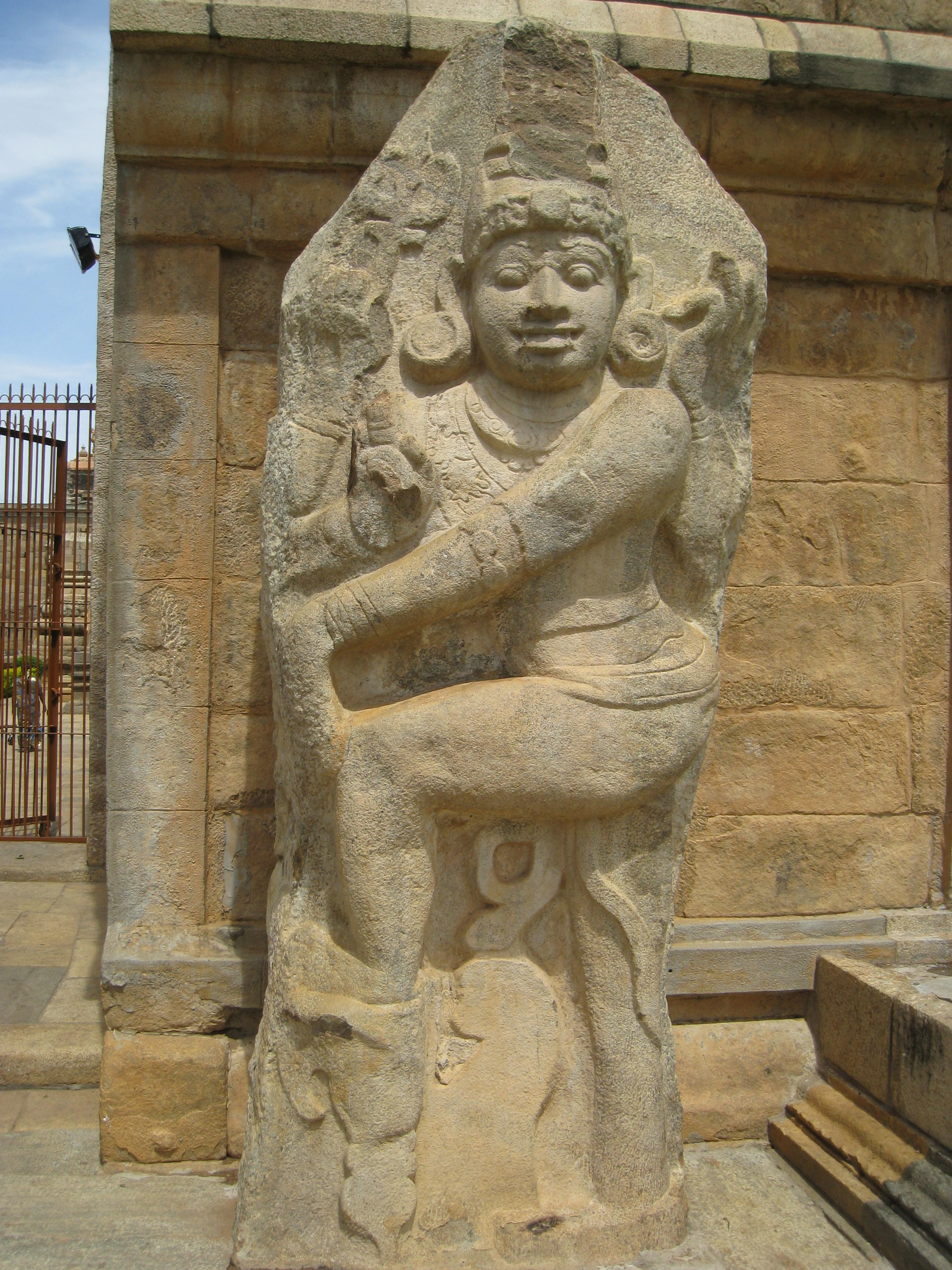
Dvarapalaka (Gatekeeper)

==== Vaishnavism, Shaktism ====
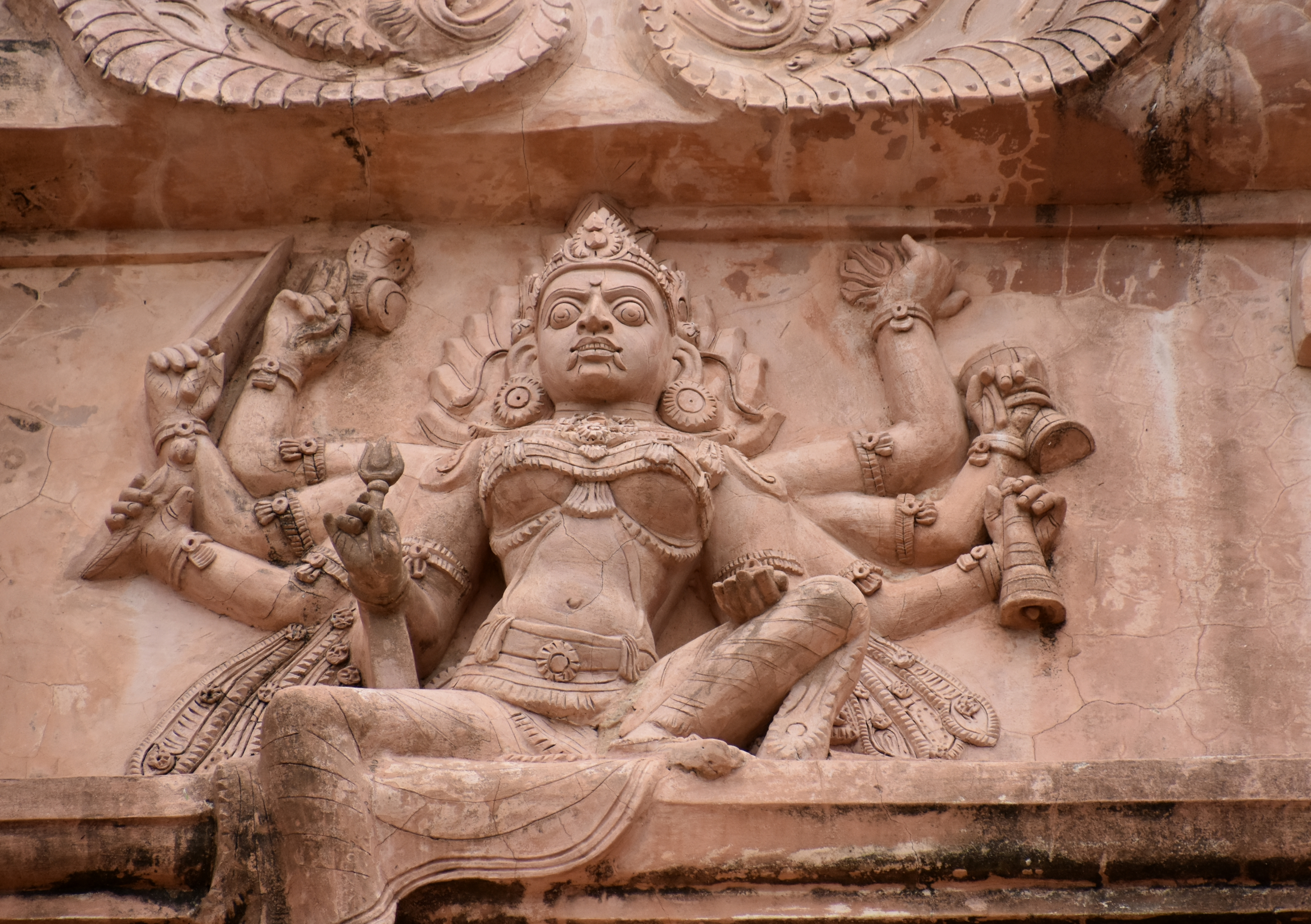
Kali is angry, ferocious form of Durga, a Shaktism deity

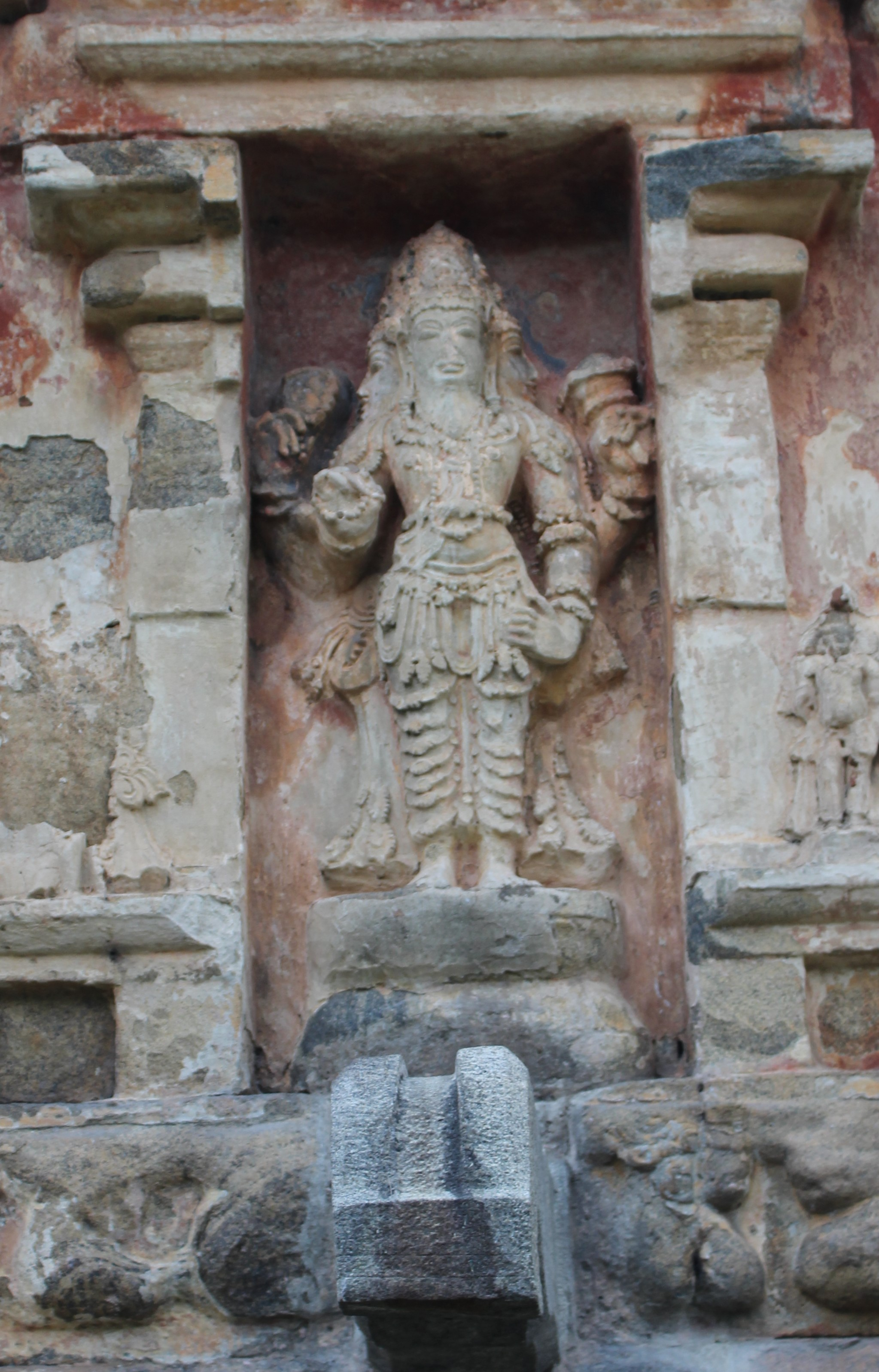
Brahma, a Vedic deity and one of the Hindu trinity

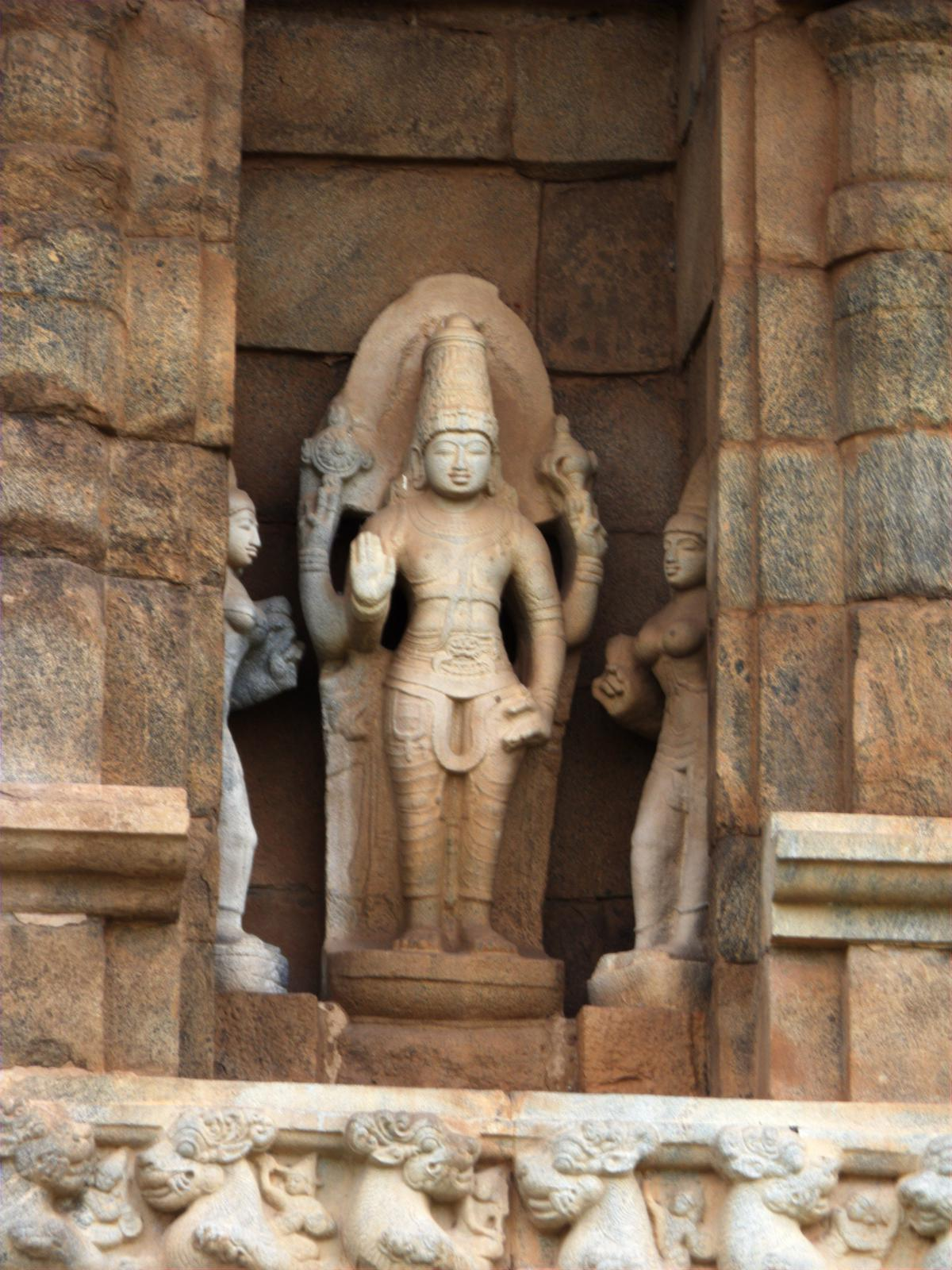
Vishnu of Vaishnavism tradition

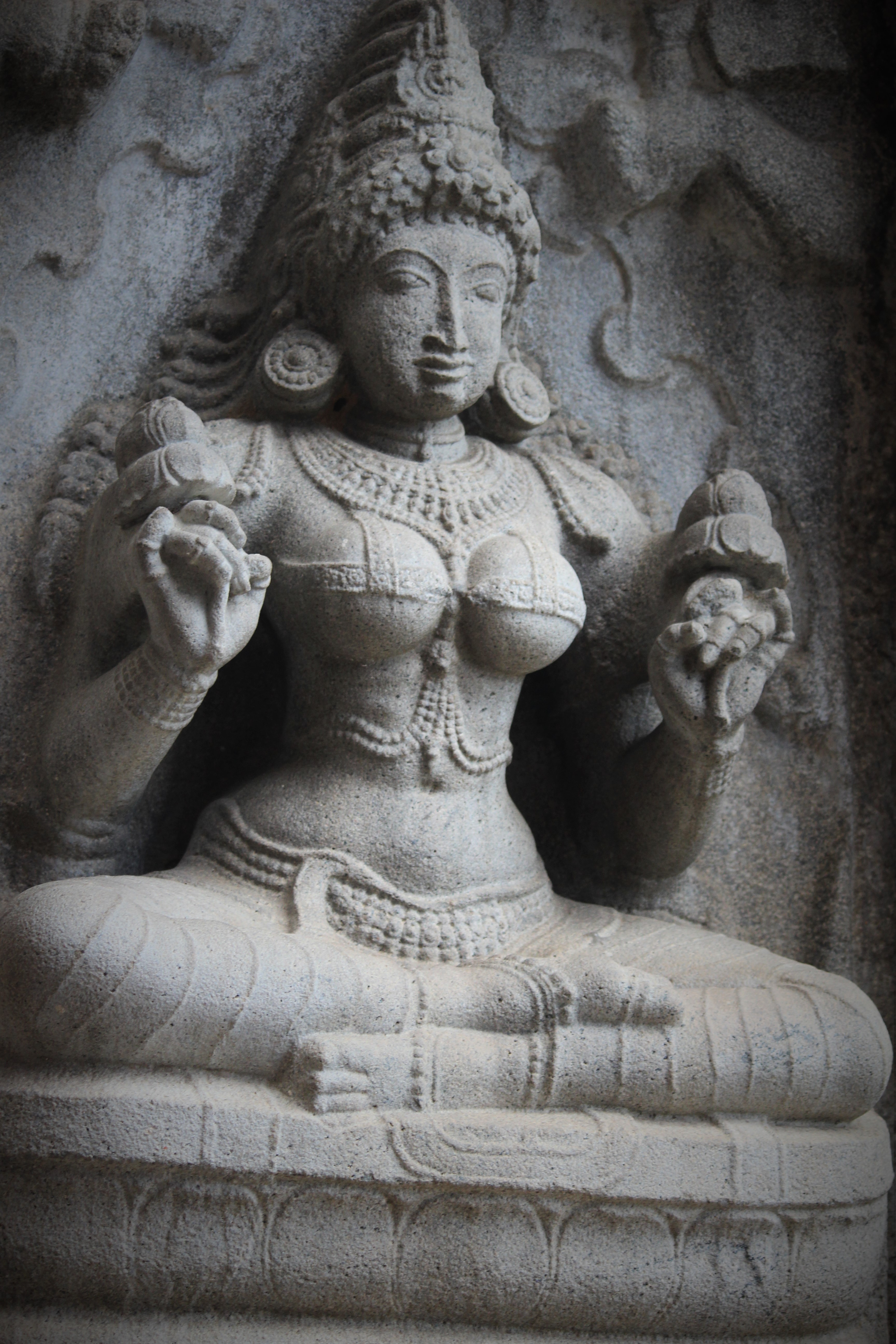
Gajalakshmi, a goddess of the Vaishnavism tradition

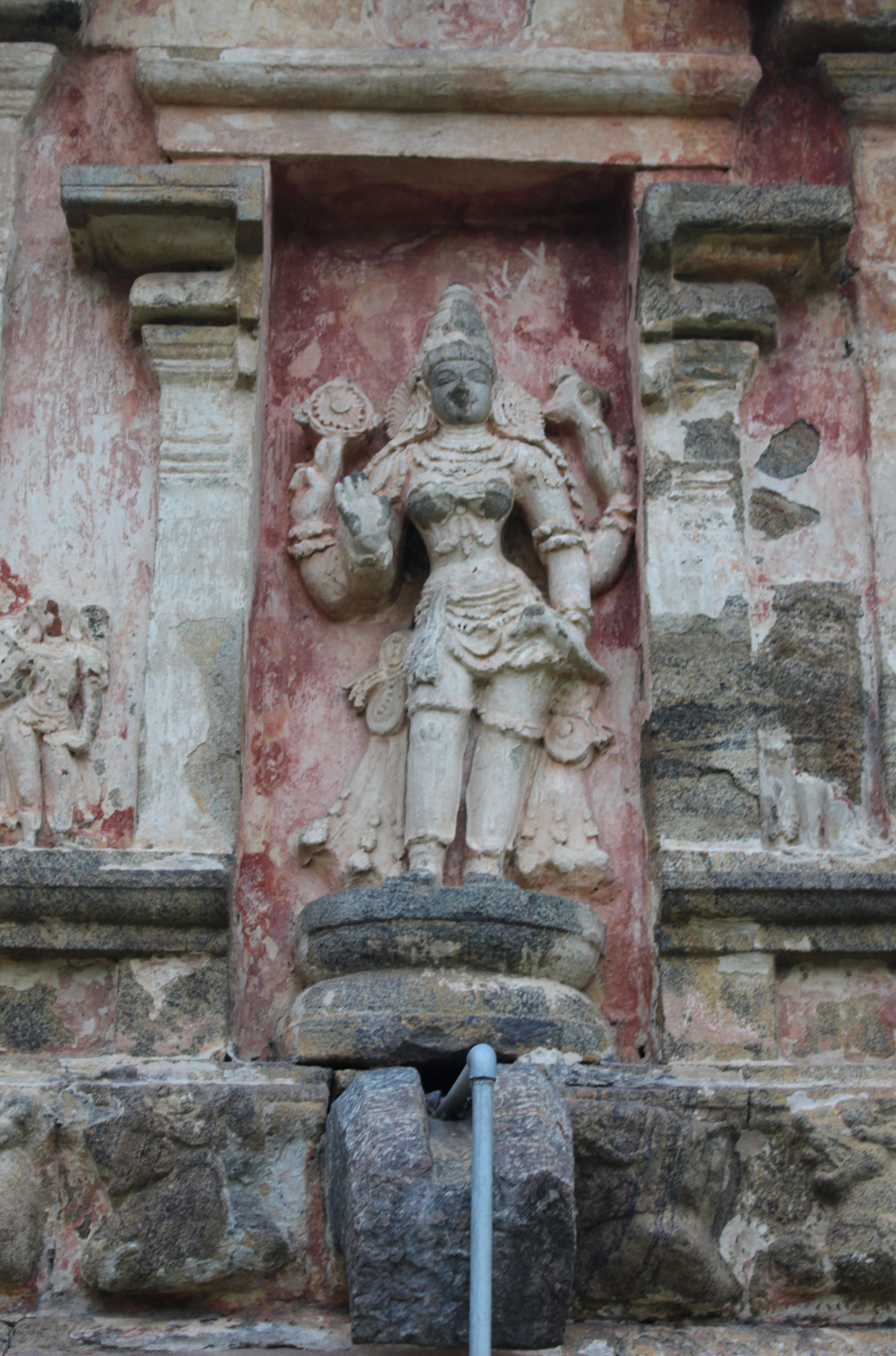
Vishnu Durga sculpture showing Vaishnavism-Shaktism fusion and the belief that Durga is Vishnu's sister.

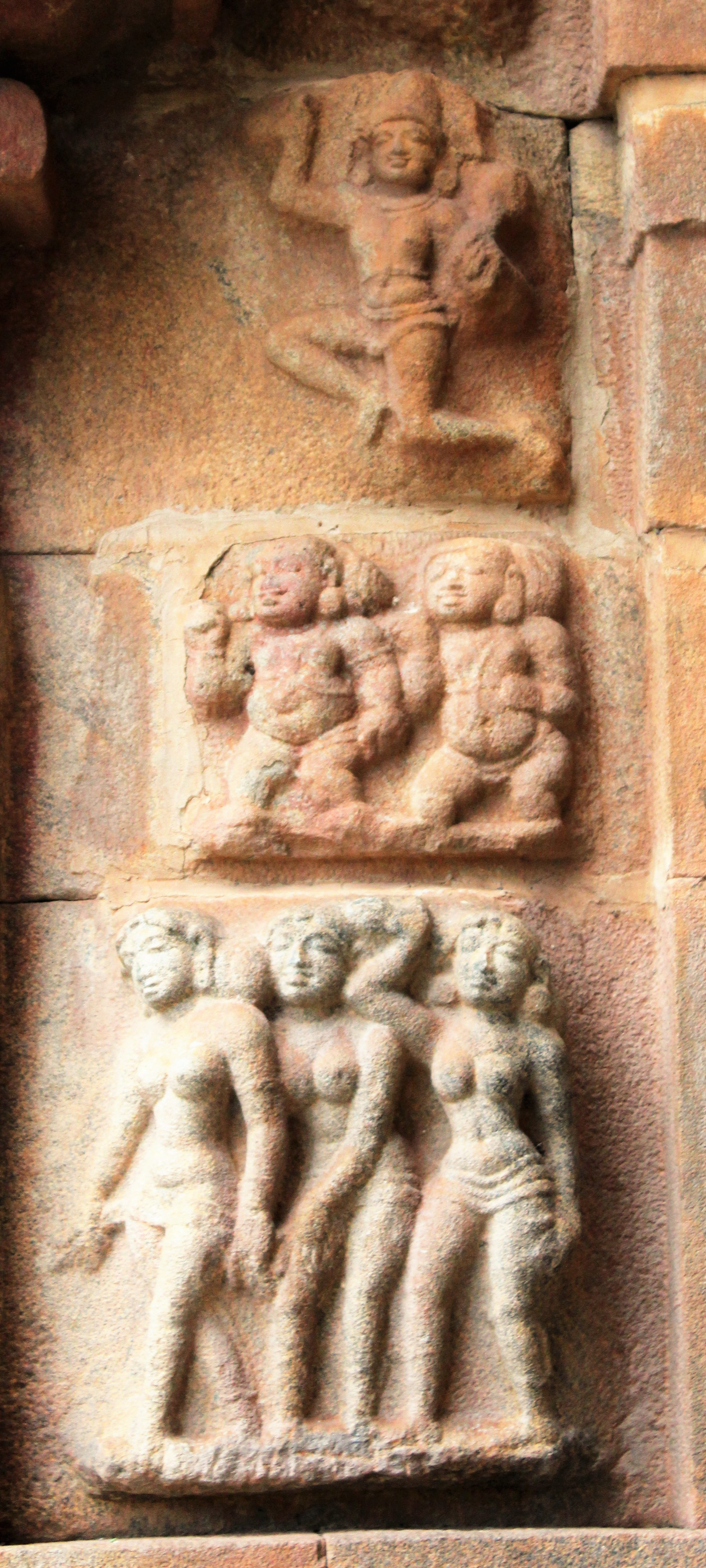
Apsara, gana and secular scenes of people are shown in numerous reliefs

==== Damaged ruins and later additions ====
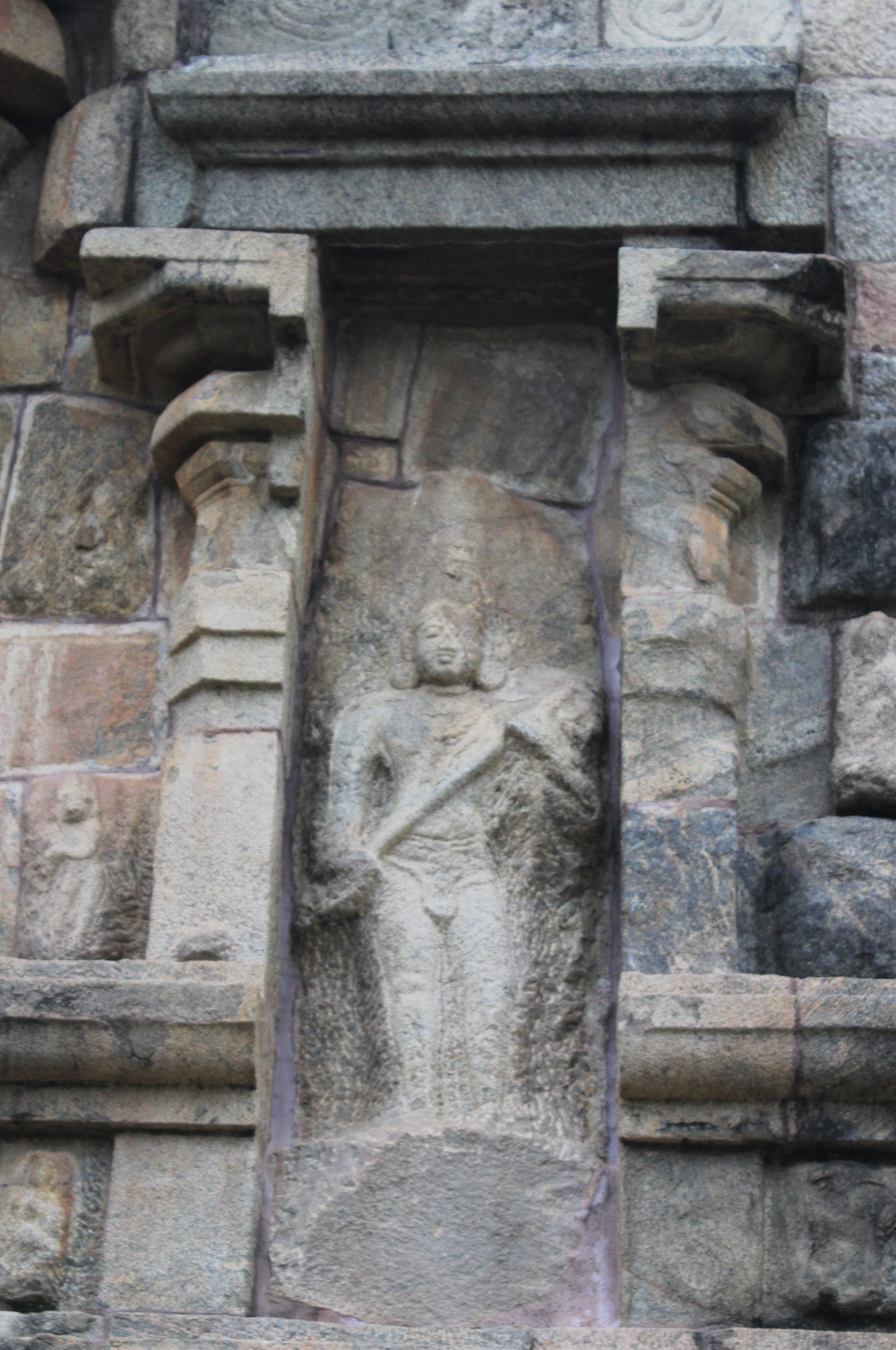
A desecrated deity relief (likely Narada)

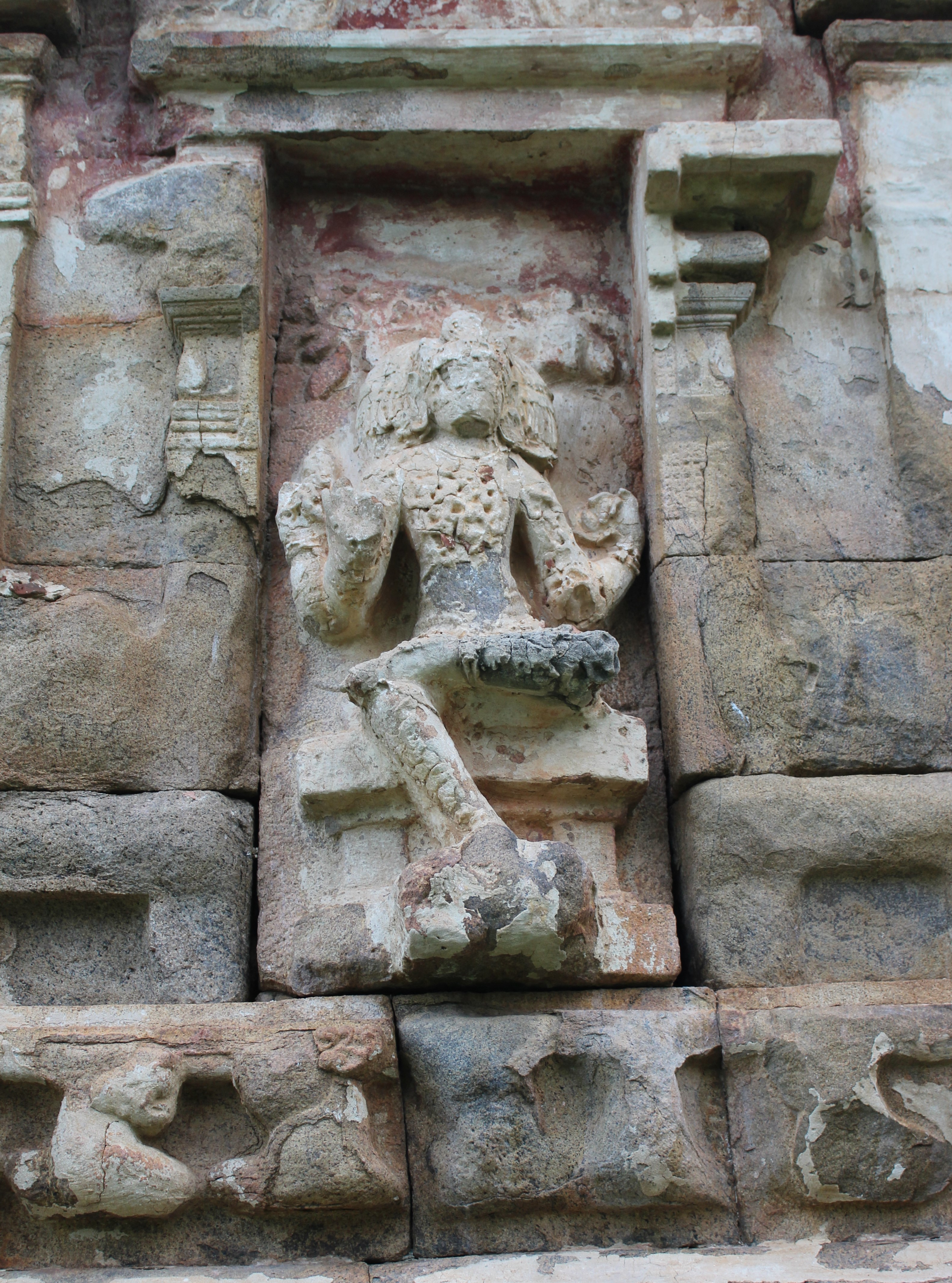
Another desecrated relief (likely Dakshinamurti)

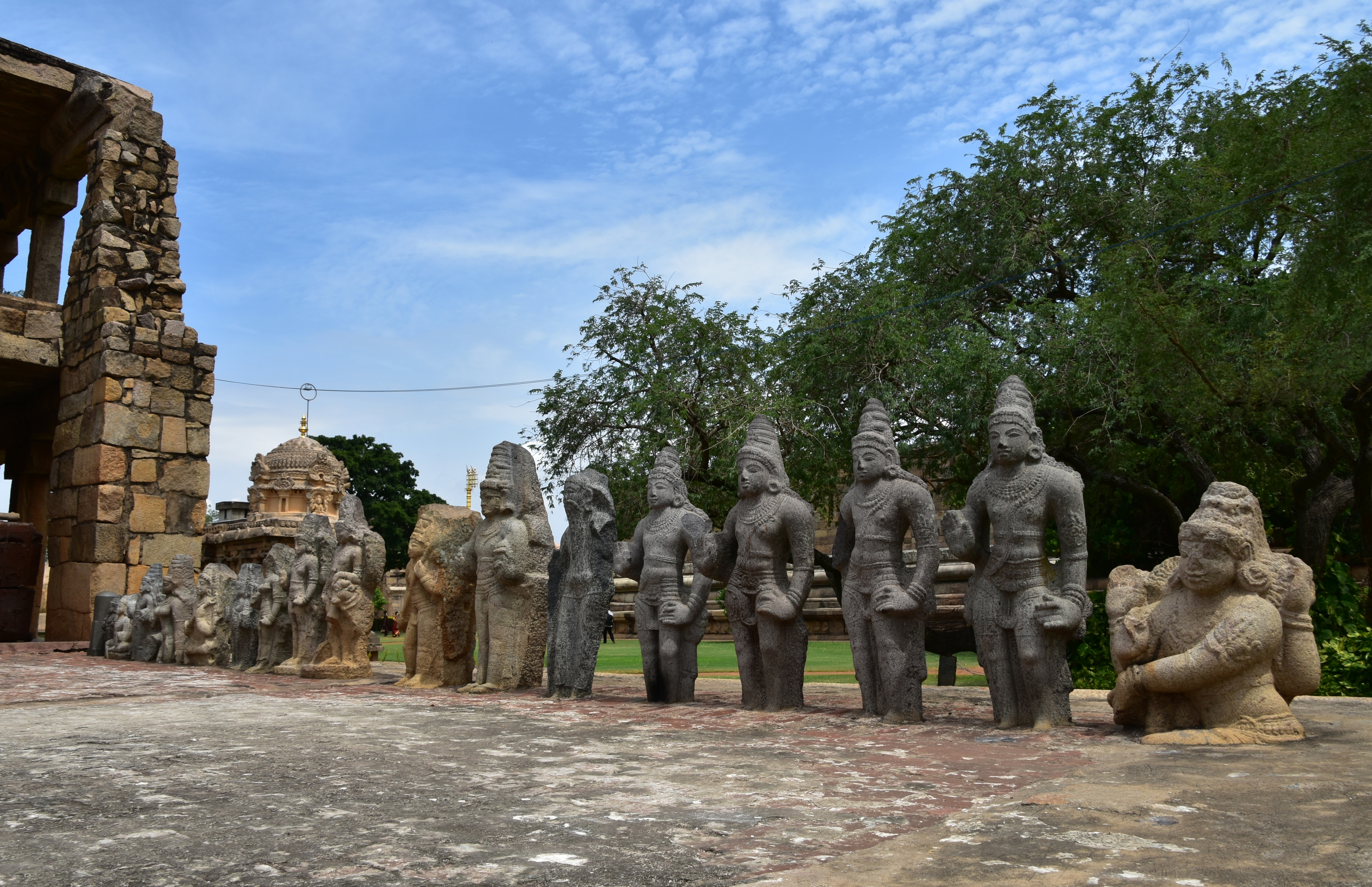
The statues recovered from the ruins

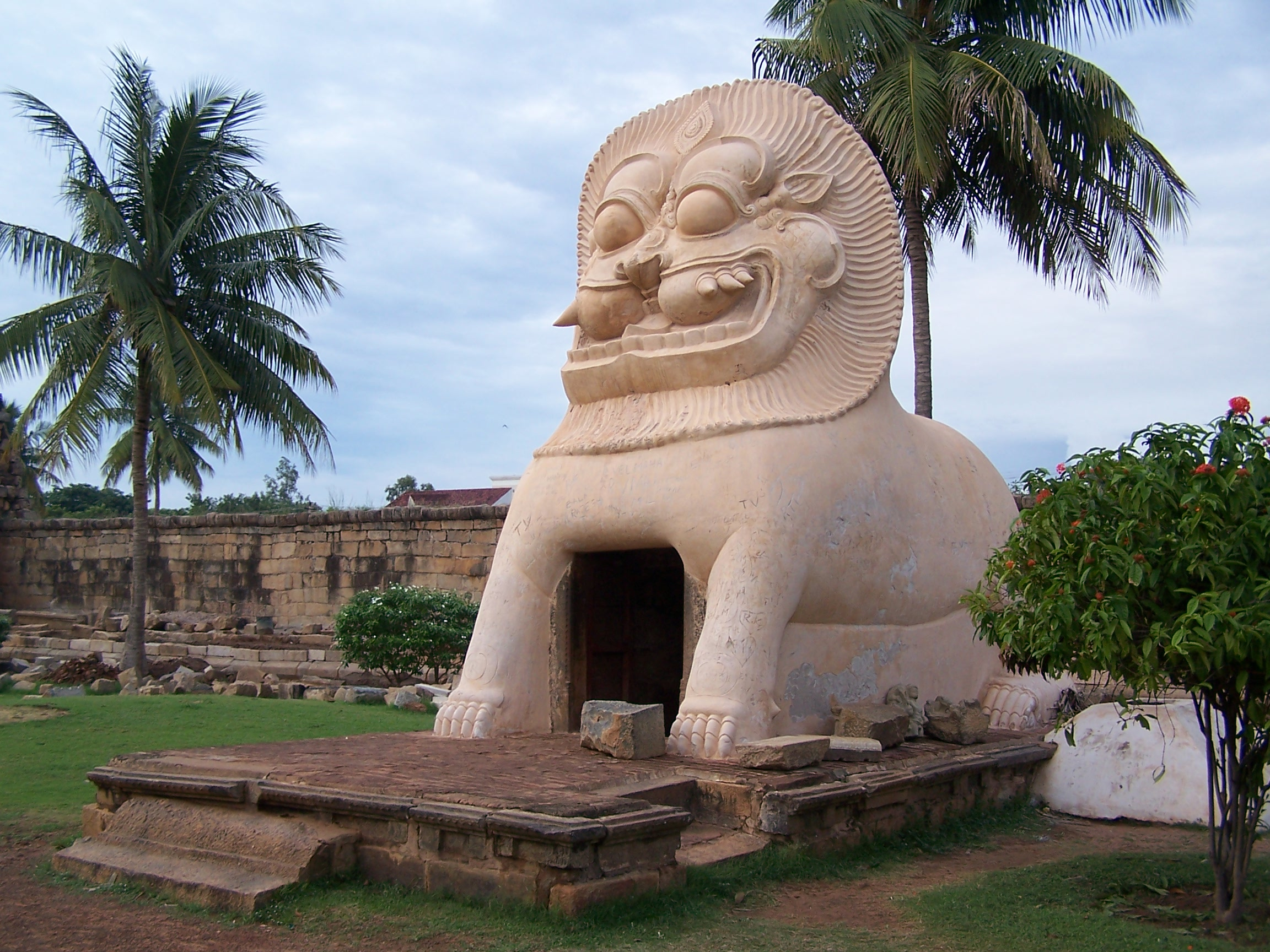
Lion in the water well in the temple, added in 19th century

== See also ==
- List of tallest structures built before the 20th century
- Raja Raja Chola I
- Chola Dynasty
- Group of Monuments at Mahabalipuram – another World Heritage Site in Tamil Nadu
